= List of Vietnamese dishes =

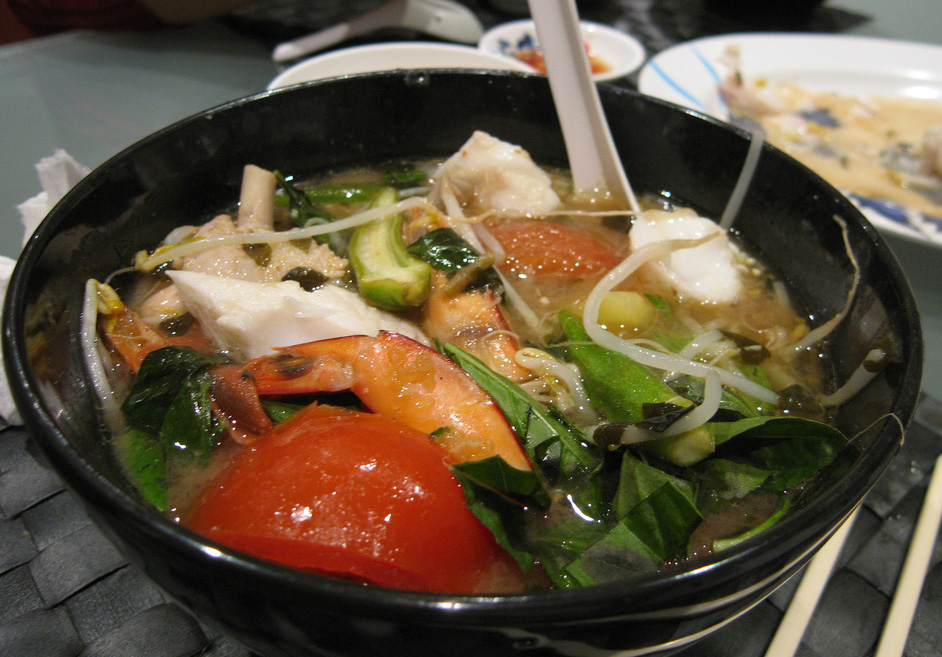
Canh chua

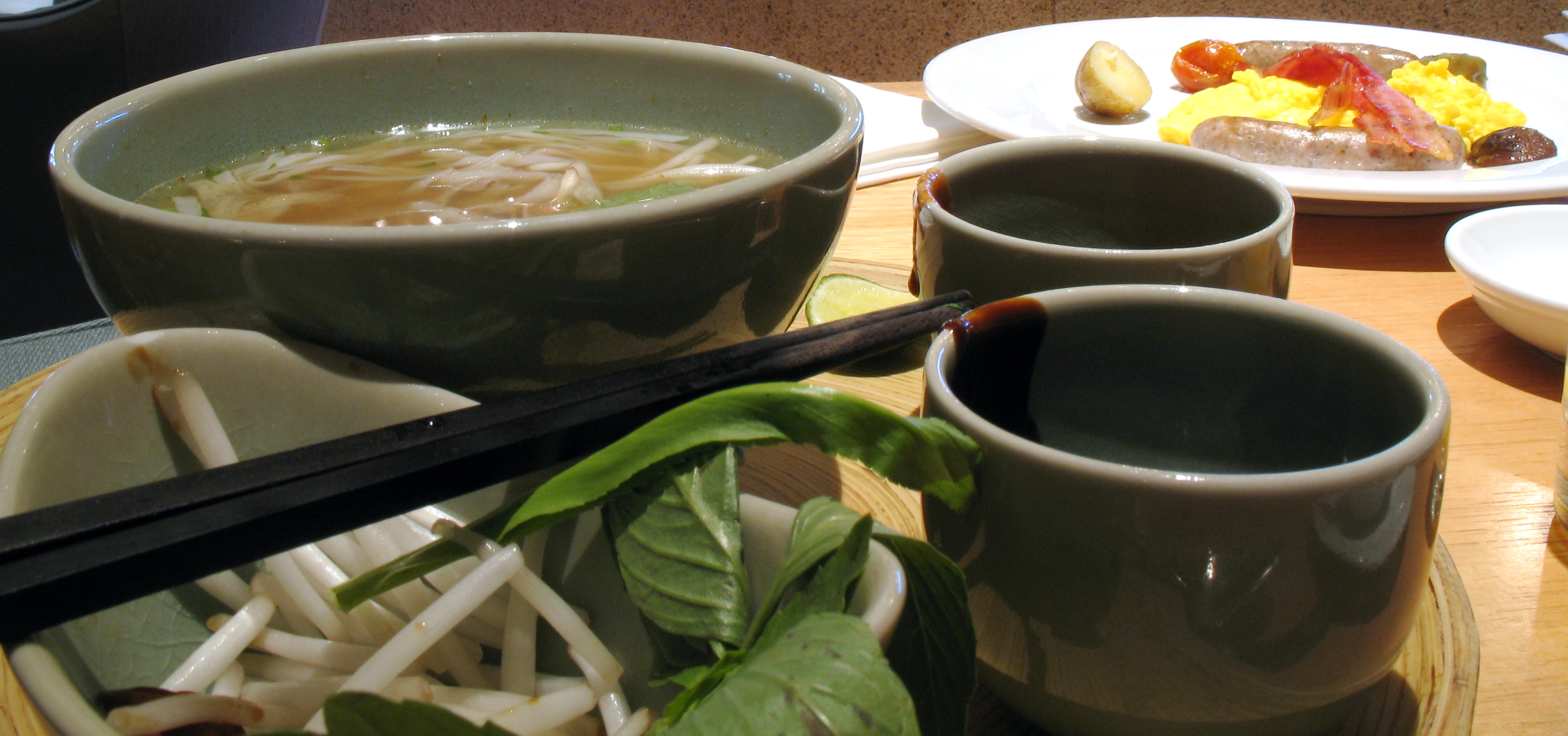
Pho and eggs in Ho Chi Minh city

This is a list of dishes found in Vietnamese cuisine.

== Noodle dishes ==
| Name | Image | Region | Type | Description |
|---|---|---|---|---|
| Bánh canh | | South of Vietnam | Noodle dish | Thick noodle |
| Bánh đa cua | | Hải Phòng | Rice paper with soup | Rice paper with crab broth |
| Bánh hỏi | | Bình Định Province | Noodle dish | Extremely thin noodles that are woven into intricate bundles and often topped with chopped scallions (spring onions) and a complementary meat dish |
| Bánh tằm cà ri | | Cà Mau | Noodles | Spicy chicken curry over special rice noodles |
| Bún bò Huế | | Huế | Noodle soup | Huế style (hot and spicy) beef rice vermicelli soup with lemongrass and pork |
| Bún bung | | Hanoi | Noodle soup | Rice vermicelli cooked with pork ribs and "dọc mùng" |
| Bún cá | | Hanoi | Noodle dish | Rice vermicelli and grilled fish balls mixed with fish sauce and raw vegetables |
| Bún chả cá | | South Central Coast | Noodle soup | Rice vermicelli soup with fried fishcake |
| Chạo tôm | | Huế | Noodle dish | Barbecued shrimp paste/mousse on a sugar cane stick |
| Bún chả | | Hanoi | Noodle dish | Vermicelli noodles with grilled pork meatballs served over salad, herbs, bean sprouts, and sliced cucumbers |
| Bún đậu mắm tôm | | Northern Vietnam | Noodle dish | Rice vermicelli with fried beans and shrimp paste |
| Bún mắm | | Trà Vinh, Sóc Trăng | Noodle soup | Rice vermicelli with broth made from fish sauce or choke fish |
| Bún mọc | | Hanoi | Noodle soup | Rice vermicelli with sprouted broth |
| Bún măng vịt | | | Noodle soup | Bamboo shoots and duck noodle soup. |
| Bún ốc | | North of Vietnam | Noodle soup | Noodles with snails |
| Bún riêu | | Red River Delta | Noodle soup | Rice vermicelli in a tomato and crab broth |
| Bún thịt nướng | | Southern Vietnam | Noodle dish | Grilled pork (often shredded) and cold vermicelli noodles over a bed of greens (salad and sliced cucumber), herbs and bean sprouts. Also often includes a few chopped up egg rolls, spring onions, and shrimp. Served with roasted peanuts on top and a small bowl of nước chấm. |
| Bún thang | | Hanoi | Noodle soup | Rice vermicelli served with broth and various other ingredients – laksa leaves, Chinese coriander, thin fried chicken eggs, shredded chicken breast, and thinly sliced pork rolls |
| Cao lầu | | Quảng Nam Province | Noodle dish | Originated from Quang Nam Province in central Vietnam, mì quảng is adamant about maintaining a variety of colors and textures, featuring a pork and shrimp-based broth, the chewy yellow of the thick turmeric noodles, the bright green ribbons of lettuce, the soft earthy pork, the tenderness of the shrimp, the pleasant crunch of crushed peanut between your teeth, and the snap of the sesame-freckled rice crackers. |
| Cellophane noodles miến, bún tàu, bún tào | | | Noodles | Transparent noodle made from starch and water, generally sold in dried form, soaked to reconstitute, then used in soups, stir-fried dishes, or spring rolls. |
| Hủ tiếu | | Southern Vietnam | Noodle soup | Chinese/Cambodian noodle soup traditionally consisting of rice noodles with pork broth. |
| Mì or Súp mì | | | Noodle soup | Vietnamese/Chinese noodle soup with yellow wheat noodles brought over by Chinese immigrants. |
| Mì Quảng | | Quảng Nam Province | Noodle dish | Ingredients often vary, but dishes most often consist of wide rice noodles served with little broth, pork chops, chicken, shrimp, vegetables, peanuts, and bánh tráng. |
| Mì xào giòn | | | Noodle dish | Deep-fried egg noodles, topped with seafood, vegetables, and a sauce |
| Phở | | Hanoi, Nam Định province | Noodle dish | Noodle soup served with various cuts of beef and onions. Often eaten with basil, mint, lime, and bean sprouts |
| Miến lươn | | Northern Vietnam, North Central Coast (Nghệ An) | Noodle soup | Rice vermicelli served with eel meat |
| Miến trộn | | | Noodle dish | Stir-fried rice vermicelli mixed with shrimp or crab, seasoned with sweet and spicy spices |
| Rice noodles bánh canh, bánh phở | | | Noodles | Made from rice flour |
| Rice vermicelli bún | | | Noodles | A type of rice noodles |

== Dumplings ==
| Name | Image | Region | Type | Description |
|---|---|---|---|---|
| Bánh ú | | | Dumpling | Bak Chang dumplings – like Chinese zongzi |
| Bánh bao | | | Dumpling | Ball-shaped bun filled with pork and other ingredients |
| Bánh bột lọc | | North Central Coast | Dumpling | Wrapper made of tapioca starch packed with shrimp |
| Bánh bột lọc trần | | | Dumpling | Dumplings with wrappers made of tapioca starch; similar to chaozhou fun guo |
| Bánh bột lọc lá | | Huế | Dumpling | Tiny rice flour dumplings stuffed with shrimp and ground pork and wrapped in a banana leaf; from Huế |
| Bánh cam | | Southern Vietnam | Dumpling | Deep-fried glutinous rice sesame balls filled with sweetened mung bean paste; from southern Vietnam |
| Bánh ít | | | Dumpling | Small stuffed glutinous rice flour balls |
| Bánh ít trần | | | Dumpling | "Naked" small stuffed glutinous rice flour balls |
| Bánh khúc | | North Vietnam | Dumpling | Glutinous rice ball filled with mung bean and fatty pork |
| Bánh nậm | | Huế | Dumpling | Flat rice flour dumpling from Huế stuffed with minced pork and mushroom, and seasoned with pepper and spices; wrapped in a banana leaf |
| Bánh phu thê | | Bắc Ninh Province | Dumpling | Literally "husband and wife cake"; a sweet cake made of rice or tapioca flour and gelatin, filled with mung bean paste; also spelled bánh xu xê (su sê) |
| Bánh phu thê bột bán | | | Dumpling | Husband and wife cakes made with tapioca pearls |
| Bánh rán | | Northern Vietnam | Dumpling | Deep-fried glutinous rice sesame balls filled with sweetened mung bean paste; from northern Vietnam |
| Bánh tẻ | | Northern Vietnam | Dumpling | Small steamed rice cake wrapped with leaves of some local trees into a long, thin cylindrical shape, and boiled thoroughly. |
| Bánh giò | | | Dumpling | Made from filtered flour, lean shoulder meat, wood ear, dried onion, pepper, fish sauce, salt... Bánh giò has a long, jutting shape like an upside down hand. |

== Pancakes and sandwiches ==
| Name | Image | Region | Type | Description |
|---|---|---|---|---|
| Bánh bèo | | Quảng Bình Province | Rice cake | Small steamed savory rice cakes |
| Bánh bột lọc | | Huế | Rice cake | Rice dumplings made in a clear rice flour batter stuffed with shrimp and ground pork. Cooked inside a banana leaf. |
| Bánh căn | | Southern Vietnam | Egg dish | A southern specialty consisting of small pancakes made with quail eggs, cooked in small clay pans |
| Bánh đúc | | | Rice or corn cake | Rice cake or corn cake eaten as a dessert or savory meal |
| Bánh khọt | | Bà Rịa–Vũng Tàu province | Pancake | A southern specialty consisting of small, fried rice flour pancakes |
| Bánh mì | | | Sandwich | Vietnamese sandwich |
| Bánh rế | | Bình Thuận Province | Pancake | Deep-fried pancake |
| Bánh xèo | | Southern Vietnam | Crepe | Coconut milk-flavored crepes |
| Bánh bột chiên | | Southern Vietnam | Rice cake | Fried rice cake with eggs and tangy soy sauce. |
| Bánh phồng tôm | | Southern Vietnam | Snack | A form of deep fried snack made from starch and prawn. |
| Bánh cống | | Sóc Trăng | Tapioca cake | Minced pork mixed with tapioca root and whole green beans, served with a circled shrimp on top. |
| Bánh quai vạc | | South Central Coast, Southern Vietnam | Tapioca cake | Made from tapioca starch, filled with shrimp and meat inside. |
| Bánh tai | | Phú Thọ | Rice cake | Made from plain rice flour, pork and some other spices. |
| Bánh tai heo | | | Tapioca cake | Made from flour, granulated sugar, white sesame, condensed milk, eggs, butter, vanilla, cooking oil, salt, water... and processed by deep frying. |

== Rolls, salads, and rice papers ==
| Name | Image | Region | Type | Description |
|---|---|---|---|---|
| Bánh cuốn | | Hanoi | Roll | Steamed rice roll |
| Bánh tôm | | Hanoi | Seafood dish | Shrimp patties |
| Bánh tôm Hồ Tây | | Hanoi | Seafood dish | A shrimp patty specialty originating from the area around West Lake (Tây Hồ), Hanoi |
| Bánh tráng | | Central Vietnam, Binh Dinh | Rice paper | Rice paper |
| Bánh ướt | | Khánh Hòa Province | Rice paper | Steamed rice paper |
| Chả giò or Nem rán | | | Roll | Fried pork spring rolls |
| Gỏi cuốn | | | Roll | Soft vermicelli summer roll |
| Gỏi cá | | | Roll | Raw fish meat wrapped in rice paper rolls with herbs, served with dipping sauce |
| Gỏi cá trích | | Phú Quốc | Seafood dish | Raw herring salad |
| Món cuốn | | | Roll | Roll which includes a variety of ingredients rolled in rice paper (bánh tráng) |
| Popiah bò bía | | | Roll | Spring roll wrapped in a soft, thin paper-like crepe or pancake made from wheat flour |
| Trảng Bàng dew-wetted rice paper bánh tráng phơi sương Trảng Bàng | | Tây Ninh Province | Rice paper | Wetted rice paper |

== Cơm (non-glutinous rice dishes) ==
| Name | Image | Region | Type | Description |
|---|---|---|---|---|
| Cơm nắm | | Northern Vietnam | Rice dish | Rice ball |
| Cơm tấm | | Saigon | Rice dish | Warm broken rice often served with a slab of grilled pork chop marinated in sugar and fish sauce (sườn), a slice of steamed pork loaf topped with egg yolks (chả trứng hấp), and a mixture of pork skin and thinly shredded pork (bì). |
| Cơm rượu | | Southern Vietnam | Dessert | Dessert from Southern Vietnam, made from glutinous rice |
| Cơm cháy | | Ninh Bình, Hải Phòng | Dessert | Crispy golden brown rice at the bottom of the cooking pot – which is then left dried in natural sunlight for 2–3 days |
| Cơm hến | | Huế | Rice dish | A rice dish made from cooked baby river mussels (basket clams), rice, peanuts, pork rinds, shrimp paste, chili paste, starfruits and bạc hà stems. It is normally served with the broth of cooked mussels |
| Cơm gà Quảng Nam | | Quảng Nam | Rice dish | Cooked rice served with boiled chicken and sprinkled with chicken broth |
| Cơm lam | | Northern midlands and mountainous, Central Highlands | Rice dish | Glutinous rice and other ingredients placed in bamboo tubes and cooked on fire |
| Cơm chiên | | | Rice dish | Rice fried with meat, eggs, and vegetables |

== Xôi (glutinous rice dishes) ==
| Name | Image | Region | Type | Description |
|---|---|---|---|---|
| Xôi | | | Sticky rice dish | Sweet (ngọt) or savory (mặn) dish made from glutinous rice and other ingredients. |
| Oản | | | Sticky rice dish | White sticky rice, granulated sugar or cake flour formed into a truncated pyramid shape – used as an offering in Buddhist temples. |
| Xôi chiên | | | Sticky rice dish | White sticky rice flattened and deep fried in oil. |
| Xôi đỗ xanh | | Northern Vietnam, Central Vietnam | Sticky rice dish | Mung beans are scrubbed, soaked and peeled – then mixed with glutinous rice and steamed. |
| Xôi gà | | | Sticky rice dish | White sticky rice cooked with coconut milk and shredded boiled/ roasted chicken, then served in bowls or pandan leaves. |
| Xôi gấc | | | Sticky rice dish | Sticky rice cooked with gac meat to create a bright red color and delicious flavor. |
| Xôi lá cẩm | | | Sticky rice dish | Sticky rice cooked in Camellia leaves to create a red purple color. |
| Xôi đậu phộng | | | Sticky rice dish | Soaked glutinous rice cooked with boiled peanuts. |
| Xôi ngũ sắc | | Northwest | Sticky rice dish | Sticky rice cooked with multiple-colored rice leaves to create 5 colors that represent the Five Elements |
| Xôi sắn | | Northern Vietnam | Sticky rice dish | Glutinous rice mixed with glutinous cassava roots that have been grated or cut into small pieces, then cooked and seasoned with fried onions and oil. |
| Xôi vò | | | Sticky rice dish | Sticky rice cooked separately with pandan leaves for aroma, and turmeric powder for color. |
| Xôi xéo | | Hanoi | Sticky rice dish | Sticky rice placed into a bowl, then cut into slices with a knife, and sprinkled with green beans and fried onions. |

== Soups, stews and cháo (congees) ==
| Name | Image | Region | Type | Description |
|---|---|---|---|---|
| Bird's nest soup súp yến sào | | | Soup | Bird's nest soup |
| Canh chua | | Mekong Delta | Soup | Hot and sour soup |
| Canh khoai mỡ | | | Soup | Purple yam soup |
| Khổ qua nhồi thịt | | | Soup | Bitter gourd stuffed with meat, then bundled with scallions and cooked in bone broth |
| Ốc nấu chuối đậu | | | Soup | A rustic but quite sophisticated dish that consists of boiled snails cooked with green bananas, fried beans, bacon, adorned with guise leaves and perilla |
| Congee cháo | | | Rice dish | Rice porridge |
| Cháo lòng | | | Rice dish | Rice porridge cooked in broth made from pork bones and boiled pork intestines |
| Lẩu | | | Hot pot | Spicy sour soup with assorted vegetables, meats, and seafood |
| Phá lấu | | Saigon | Soup/Stew | Pork offal stew |
| Súp măng cua | | | Soup | Asparagus-crab combination soup |
| Thịt kho tàu | | | Soup/Stew | Fatty pork and eggs braised in coconut juice |
| Bò kho | | | Meat dish | Beef and vegetable stew |

== Other dishes ==
| Name | Image | Region | Type | Description |
|---|---|---|---|---|
| Balut trứng vịt lộn or hột vịt lộn | | | Egg dish | Fertilized duck (or chicken) egg with a nearly-developed embryo inside that is boiled and eaten in the shell |
| Bánh | | | | "Cake" or "bread" |
| Bánh chưng | | Northern Vietnam | Rice dish | Square-shaped steamed glutinous rice dumpling wrapped in a Phrynium placentarium leaf (lá dong) The dish is a traditionally served around Vietnamese New Year to be eaten with pickled leeks |
| Bánh giầy | | Northern Vietnam | Rice dish | White, flat, and round glutinous rice cake, wrapped in cut pieces of banana leaves, and usually served with a type of Vietnamese sausage chả lụa |
| Bánh đa nướng | | | Rice dish | Called Bánh tráng nướng in the South, large round flat rice crackers |
| Bánh gối | | | Stuffed pastry | Deep fried pastry stuffed with cellophane noodles, minced pork, cloud ear fungus and thin slices of chinese sausage |
| Bánh lá | | Huế | Rice dish | Parcel of a variety of rice stuffed with some fillings and wrapped in a leaf or leaves. |
| Black pudding dồi tiết' (Northern) or dồi huyết (Southern) | | | Sausage | Blood sausage |
| Bò 7 món | | Saigon | Meat dish | 7 courses of beef |
| Cassava-based dishes | | | | |
| Chả | | | Sausage | Sausage |
| Cốm | | Red River Delta | Rice dish | Young rice, roasted and wrapped in lotus leaves; the accompaniment is ripened bananas |
| Giò lụa | | | Sausage | A pork sausage, similar to Bologna sausage |
| Lò trấu | | | | Fixed Rice Husk Stove |
| Nem chua | | | Meat dish | Cured fermented pork |
| Ô mai | | Hanoi | Fruit dish | Snack made from salted dried apricot or sugared dried apricot |
| Ốc bươu nhồi thịt | | | Meat dish | Minced snail mixed with ground pork, carrot, black mushroom stuffed in snail shell |
| Rousong chà bông | | | Meat dish | Meat floss |
| Bò nướng lá lốt | | | Meat dish | Ground beef wrapped in lolot (NEVER grape leaves) |
| Tiết canh | | | Blood | Fresh animal blood mixed with fish sauce/ light salted water – used with chopped meat and animal cartilage |
| You tiao quẩy | | | Doughnut | A long, golden-brown, deep fried strip of dough |

== Sweet cakes and desserts ==
| Name | Image | Region | Type | Description |
|---|---|---|---|---|
| Bánh bò | | Southern Vietnam | Dessert | "Cow cake" (literal name in Vietnamese), made from glutinous rice flour and coconut milk, with a honeycomb-like texture |
| Bánh rế | | Bình Thuận | Dessert | Bánh rế is a Vietnamese street food made from sweet potatoes. The sweet potato is made into a pancake, deep-fried, then sugared. |
| Bánh cáy | | Thái Bình | Dessert | Rectangular-shaped sweet dessert made by roasting and grinding glutinous rice and other ingredients |
| Bánh da lợn | | Southern Vietnam | Dessert | Colored steamed layer cake made from tapioca starch, rice flour, coconut milk, water, sugar, and other ingredients |
| Bánh chuối | | | Dessert | Banana cake |
| Bánh cốm | | Hanoi | Dessert | Made from cốm, green bean paste, grated coconut and pumpkin jam or naked lotus jam. Often used for engagement ceremonies |
| Bánh đậu xanh | | Hải Dương | Dessert | Made from ground mung bean paste with sugar and vegetable oil or animal fat |
| Bánh gai | | Northern Vietnam | Dessert | The crust is made up of glutinous rice flour and hemp leaves; the filling is of finely chopped lard, banana essential oil, coconut rice, and cooked green beans |
| Bánh tro | | Northern Vietnam | Dessert | Leaves are burned into ashes and then soaked with glutinous rice to create a golden brown color like amber. Served with sugar or honey/ molasses. |
| Bánh in | | Huế | Dessert | A Vietnamese cake from the Huế, often sold in small rectangular shaped snack packs. The main ingredients include mung bean, rice flour and durian |
| Bánh Flan | | | Dessert | Vietnamese adaptation of flan that was introduced during French colonization. Often used condensed milk as the base for a somewhat denser and heavier texture. |
| Bánh kẹp lá dứa | | | Dessert | Pandan and coconut flavored waffle eaten plain |
| Bánh khoai mì | | | Dessert | Sweet cassava cake |
| Bánh khảo | | Northern Vietnam (Hải Dương) | Dessert | Glutinous flour roasted with sugar, filled with pumpkin jam and fat |
| Bánh lọt | | Southern Vietnam | Dessert | Made from rice flour and tapioca starch with the aroma of coconut milk, sugar, and the green and white color of pandan leaves |
| Bánh mật | | Northern Vietnam | Dessert | Made from glutinous rice flour mixed with mung bean molasses, and wrapped in banana leaves |
| Bánh nhãn | | Nam Định | Dessert | Made from fragrant glutinous rice or Hai Hau yellow sticky rice, chicken eggs, white sugar and lard |
| Bánh pía | | Sóc Trăng Province | Dessert | Teochew-style with durian |
| Bánh tét | | Southern Vietnam | Rice dish | Log-shaped cylindrical glutinous rice cake, wrapped in a banana leaf and filled with a meat or vegetarian filling |
| Bánh tiêu | | | Dessert | Hollow doughnuts |
| Bánh trung thu | | | Dessert | Mooncake |
| Chè | | | Dessert | Sweet dessert soup or pudding |
| Chè trôi nước | | Southern Vietnam | Dessert | Dessert consisting of balls made from mung bean paste wrapped in a shell made of glutinous rice flour. |
| Chè bánh lọt | | | Dessert | Coconut milk, a worm-like jelly made from rice flour with green food coloring (usually derived from the pandan leaf), shaved ice and palm sugar |
| Chuối chiên | | | Dessert | Banana fried in a batter |
| Coconut candy kẹo dừa | | Bến Tre Province | Dessert | Candy made with coconut milk and coconut cream |
| Sữa chua | | | Dessert | Yogurt made with condensed milk |
| Douhua tào phớ | | | Tofu dish | Soybean pudding |
| Grass jelly thạch sương sáo | | | Dessert | Made by boiling the aged and slightly oxidized stalks and leaves of Mesona chinensis (member of the mint family) with potassium carbonate for several hours with a little starch and then cooling the liquid to a jelly-like consistency |
| Mè xửng Huế | | Huế | Dessert | A chewy candy originally from the city of Huế, made with boiled down cane sugar, (into a soft and thick solid), coated with sesame seeds, and usually containing peanuts. |
| Bánh trôi | | Northern Vietnam | Rice dish | Boiled Glutinous rice balls – also called bánh chay; literally "floating cake") – served together with bánh chay |
| Tapioca pudding chè chuối | | | Dessert | Made from bananas and tapioca |
| Taro cake bánh khoai môn | | | Dessert | Taro cake |
| Thạch rau câu or sương sa | | | Dessert | Gelatin dessert |
| Rượu nếp | | Northern Vietnam | Dessert | Sweet dessert made from black glutinous rice. |
| Sâm bổ lượng | | Saigon | Soup | Sweet, cold soup |

== Condiments and sauces ==
| Name | Image | Region | Type | Description |
|---|---|---|---|---|
| Chẳm chéo | | Điện Biên Phủ, Northwest Vietnam | Condiment | Based on Thai sauce, nam chim chaeo (or nam jim jaew) brought over by ethnic Thai people in Vietnam. Main ingredients are coriander, bird's eye chili, garlic, different herbs, hạt dổi and mắc khén (Indian prickly ash; a variety of Sichuan pepper). There are different types of chẳm chéo as well. Eaten with vegetables, meats, and sometimes fruit. |
| Fish sauce nước mắm | | | Base Condiment | A base condiment that is derived from fish that have been allowed to ferment. It is normally used as seasoning during cooking or a base for sauces with other ingredients and is not to be used by itself. |
| Hoisin sauce tương đen | | | Condiment | A popular condiment for phở in Ho Chi Minh City |
| Muối ớt rau răm | | | Condiment | Dipping sauce made with Vietnamese coriander, bird's eye chilis, lime, and other ingredients. Used as a dipping sauce for meats or trứng vịt lộn. |
| Muối ớt xanh | | Central Vietnam | Condiment | Dipping sauce with green bird's eye chilis and kaffir lime leaves as main ingredients. Usually served with seafood. |
| Nước chấm | | | Condiment | Dipping sauce with fish sauce, water, sugar, lime and sometimes chilis and ginger. |
| Peanut sauce tương đậu phộng | | | Condiment | Used in cuốn diếp |
| Sa tế | | Chợ Lớn, Ho Chi Minh City, Southern Vietnam | Condiment | Chili jam |
| Shrimp paste mắm tôm | | | Condiment | Shrimp paste |
| Soy sauce xì dầu or nước tương | | | Condiment | Condiment produced from fermented soybeans |
| Tương | | | Condiment | Condiments made from fermented bean paste |
| Tương ớt | | | Condiment | Hot/chili sauce that varies in different regions. |

== Beverages ==
| Name | Image | Region | Type | Description |
|---|---|---|---|---|
| Bia hơi | | | Beverage | Fresh beer |
| Chanh muối | | | Beverage | Salty limeade |
| Nước mía | | | Beverage | Sugar cane juice often mixed with kumquat juice |
| Nước sâm | | | Beverage | Iced ginseng drink |
| Nước sắn dây hoa bưởi | | | Beverage | Made of kudzu and pomelo flower extract. |
| Rau má | | | Beverage | Iced pennywort juice often sweetened |
| Rượu cần | | Tây Nguyên and Tây Bắc | Beverage | Rice wine |
| Rượu đế | | Mekong Delta | Beverage | Rice liquor |
| Rượu thuốc | | | Beverage | Medicinal liquor |
| Snake wine rượu rắn | | | Beverage | An alcoholic beverage produced by infusing whole snakes in rice wine or grain alcohol |
| Egg soda soda sữa hột gà | | | Beverage | Iced soda with egg, sugar and milk |
| Soy milk sữa đậu nành | | | Beverage | Beverage made from soybeans |
| Vietnamese iced coffee cà phê sữa đá | | | Beverage | Traditional Vietnamese coffee, made using medium to coarse ground dark roast Vietnamese-grown coffee with a small metal Vietnamese drip filter (phin cà phê) |
| Vietnamese lotus tea trà sen, chè sen, or chè ướp sen | | | Beverage | A type of green tea produced in Vietnam that has been flavored with the scent of Nelumbo nucifera |
| Vietnamese tea trà Việt | | | Beverage | Green tea, similar to Keemun and Yunnan, but more sweet |
| Vietnamese wine | | | Beverage | Wine produced in Vietnam |

== See also ==
- Vietnamese cuisine
- List of Vietnamese culinary specialities
- List of Vietnamese ingredients
