= Bánh =

Traditional Vietnamese confectionery

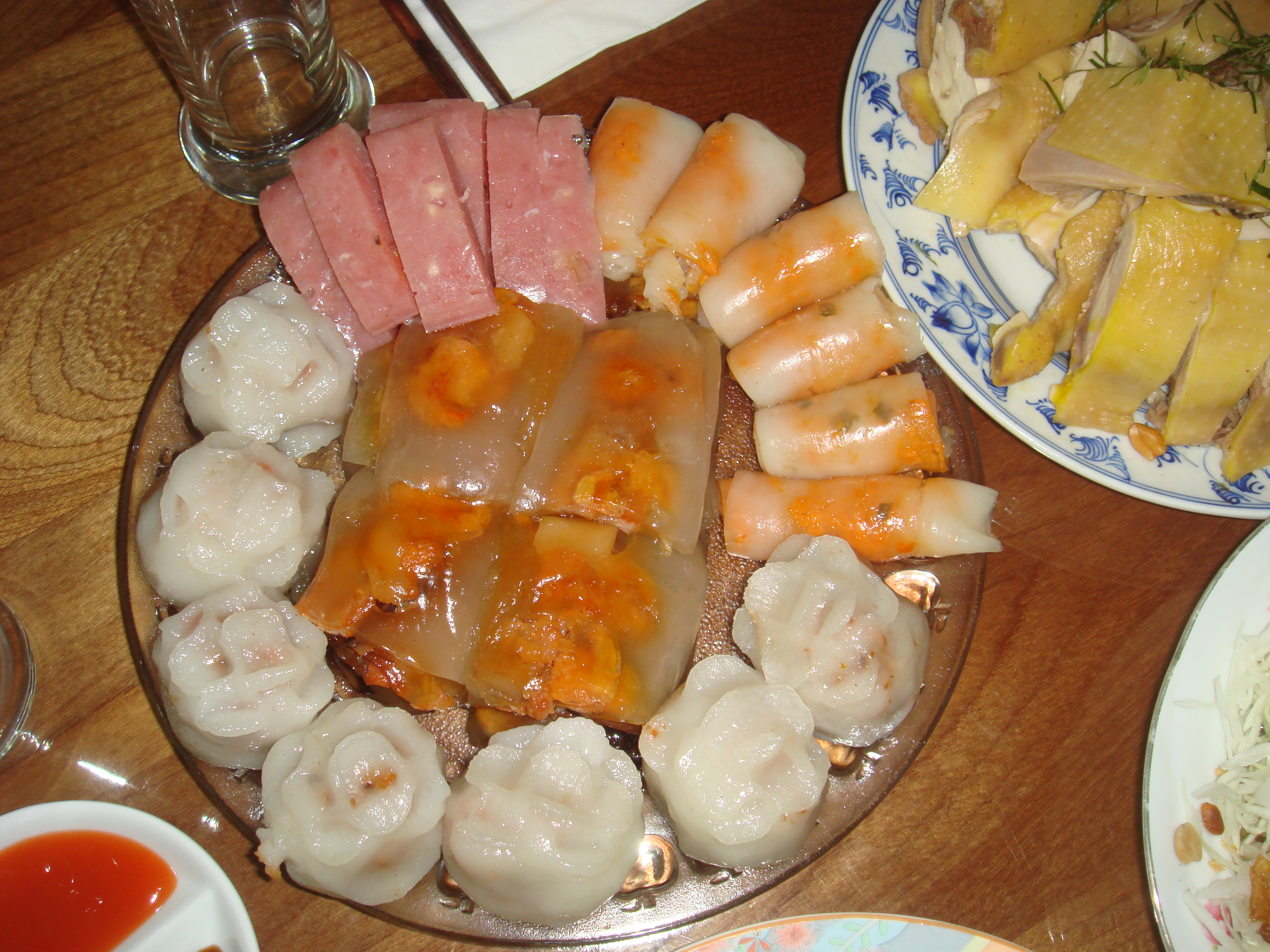
- Bánh bèo, bột lọc, and nem chua
- Type: Cakes and breads
- Course: Dessert
- Place of origin: Vietnam
- Region or state: Southeast Asia
- Main ingredients: Usually rice flour, wheat flour, pressed glutinous rice, or tapioca
- Similar dishes: Mont, Khanom, Kue, Kuih

Bánh

Vietnamese name
- Vietnamese alphabet: bánh
- Chữ Nôm: 餅

In Vietnamese, the term bánh (Hanoi: [ɓaʲŋ̟˧˥] or Saigon: [ɓan˧˥], Chữ Nôm: 餅) translates loosely as "cake" or "bread", but refers to a wide variety of prepared foods that can easily be eaten by hands or chopsticks. With the addition of qualifying adjectives, bánh refers to a wide variety of sweet or savory, distinct cakes, buns, pastries, sandwiches, and other food items, which may be cooked by steaming, baking, frying, deep-frying, or boiling. Foods made from wheat flour or rice flour are generally called bánh, but the term may also refer to certain varieties of noodle and fish cake dishes, such as bánh canh and bánh hỏi.

Each variety of bánh is designated by a descriptive word or phrase that follows the word bánh, such as bánh bò (lit. 'cow cake') or bánh chuối (lit. 'banana cake'). Bánh that are wrapped in leaves before steaming are called bánh lá (lit. 'leaf cakes').

In Vietnamese, the term bánh is not limited to Vietnamese cuisine: it applies equally to items as varied as fortune cookies (bánh may mắn), pudding (bánh pudding, bánh pútđinh), caramel custard (bánh caramen, bánh flan), sacramental bread (Bánh Thánh), Hamburger (bánh Hamburger, bánh Hămbơgơ), etc.

In some cases, the word can also refer to inedibles that have a cake-like shape, such as wheels (bánh xe), bath soaps (bánh xà phòng, bánh xà bông), and compressed tobacco wheels (bánh thuốc lào).

== Varieties ==
There is a nearly endless variety of named dishes with the prefix bánh. What follows is a list of the most typical traditional varieties of bánh.

=== Noodles ===
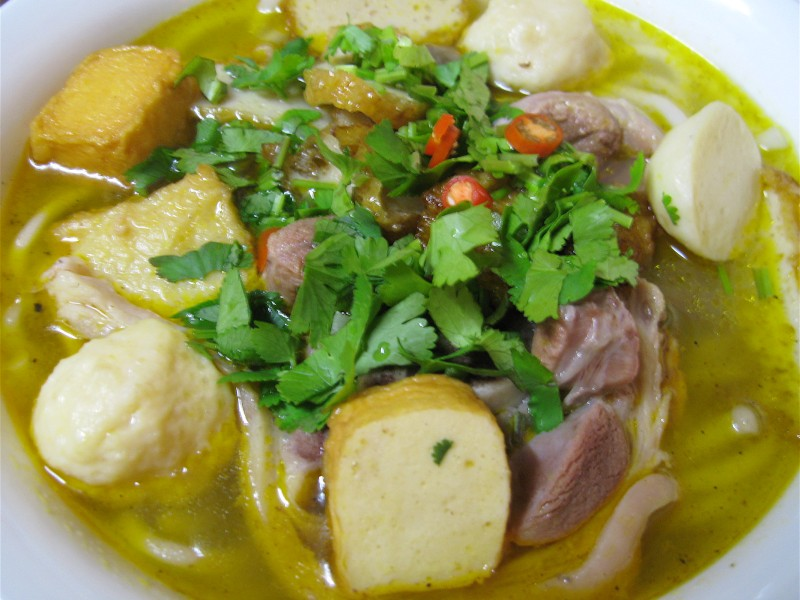
Bánh canh soup

- Bánh canh – tapioca noodles which are cut from a large sheet.
- Bánh hỏi – extremely thin noodles that are woven into intricate bundles and often topped with chopped scallions and a complementary meat dish
- Bánh phở – The steamed flat and thin cake made from rice flour and water before being cut into strips. The strips are not only called Bánh phở but also "sợi phở" or "cọng phở," and are noodles used in phở. The width of the strips is usually around 1 cm or less.

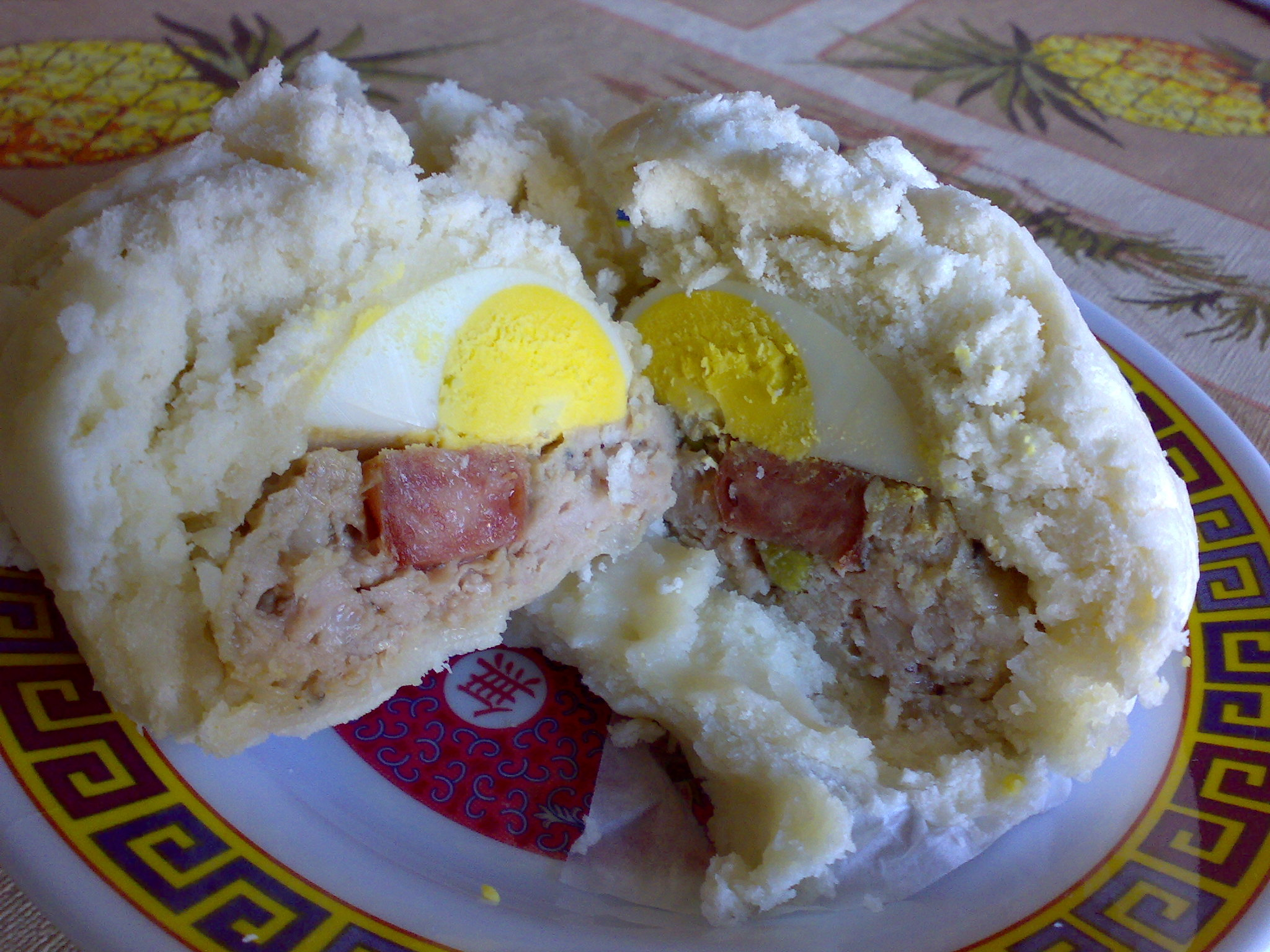
Bánh bao

=== Dumplings ===
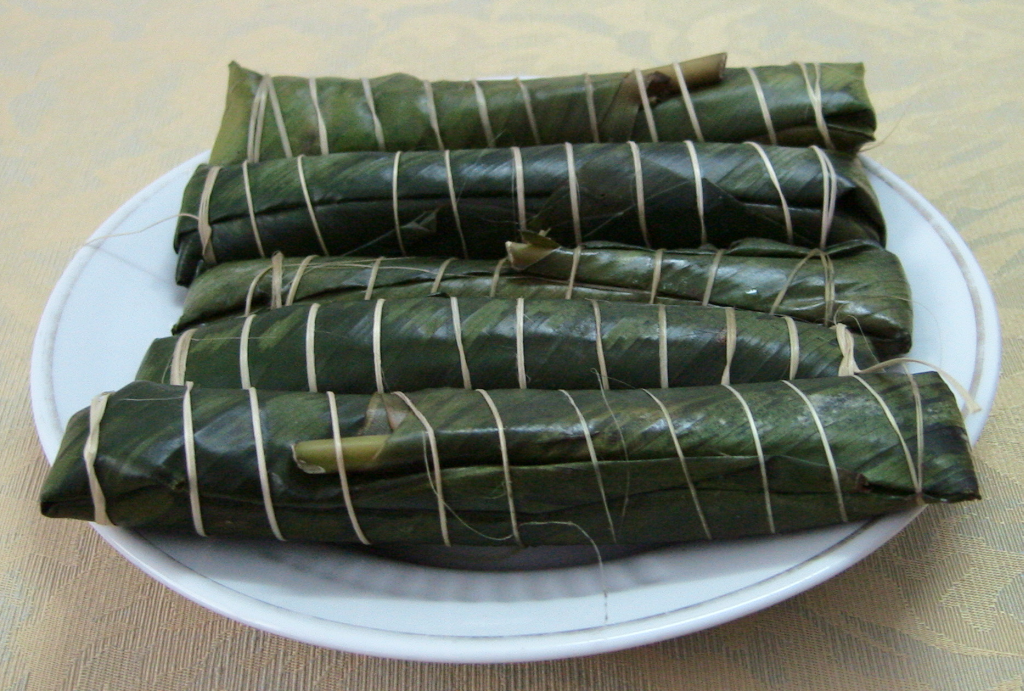
Bánh tẻ

- Bánh bá trạng or bánh ú – the Vietnamese term for zongzi
- Bánh bao – ball-shaped bun filled with pork or other ingredients
- Bánh bột lọc – tapioca cake packed with shrimp
  - Bánh bột lọc trần – dumplings with wrappers made of tapioca starch
  - Bánh bột lọc lá – tiny rice flour dumplings stuffed with shrimp and ground pork and wrapped in a banana leaf; from Hue
- Bánh cam – deep-fried glutinous rice sesame balls filled with sweetened mung bean paste; from southern Vietnam
- Bánh ít – small stuffed glutinous rice flour balls
  - Bánh ít dừa – coconut stuffed glutinous rice flour balls
  - Bánh ít trần – "boiled" small stuffed glutinous rice flour balls
- Bánh khúc – glutinous rice ball
- Bánh nậm – flat rice flour dumpling from Hue stuffed with minced pork and wood ear mushroom, and seasoned with black pepper and spices; wrapped in a banana leaf
- Bánh phu thê – ("husband and wife cake"; a sweet cake made of rice or tapioca flour and gelatin, filled with mung bean paste; also spelled bánh xu xê)
  - Bánh phu thê bột bán (husband and wife cakes made with tapioca pearls)
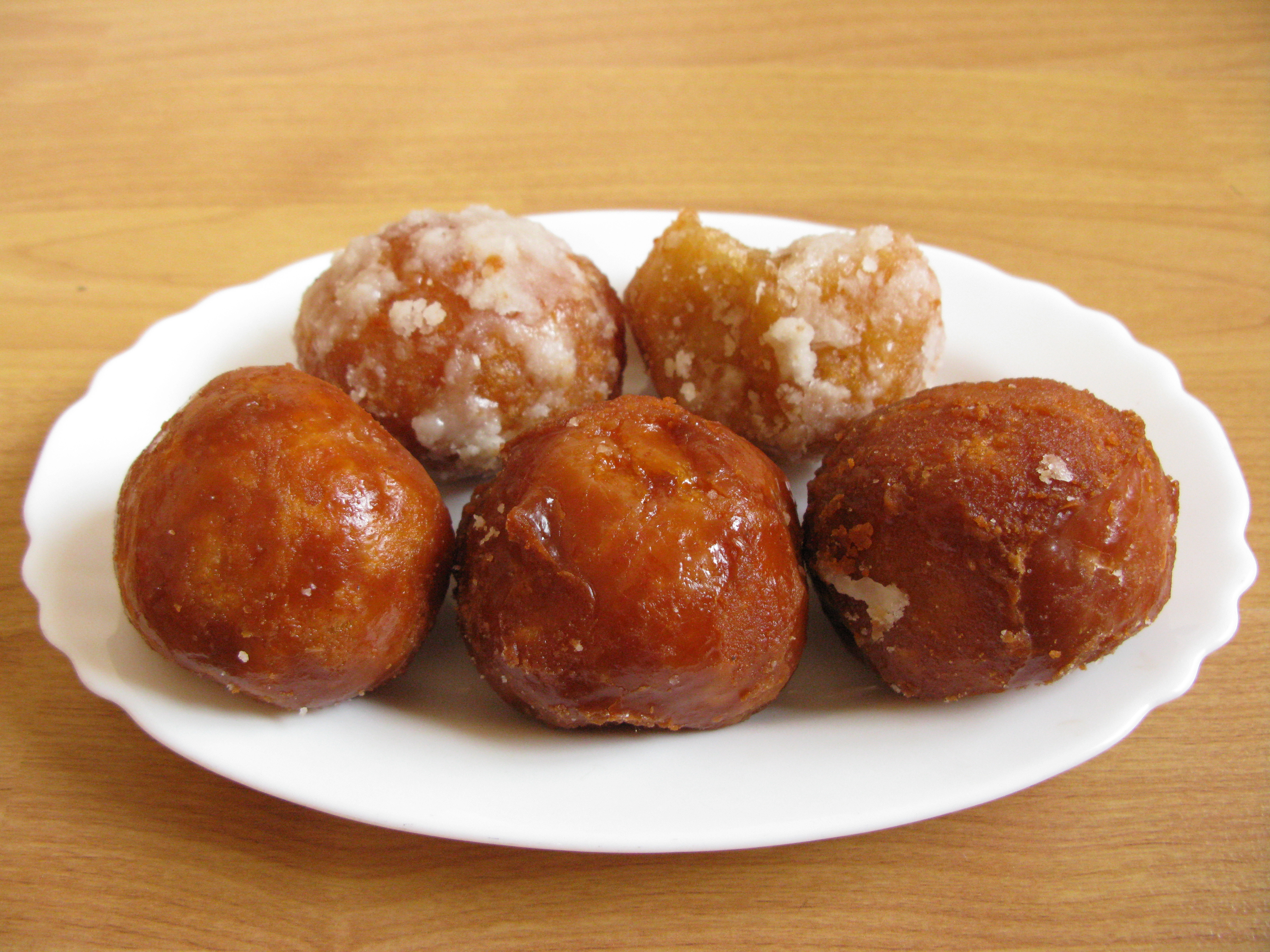
- Bánh Rán
  Bánh rán – deep-fried glutinous rice sesame balls filled with sweetened mung bean paste; from northern Vietnam
- Bánh tẻ, small steamed rice cake wrapped with Lá dong leaves into a long, thin cylindrical shape, and boiled thoroughly.

=== Pancakes ===
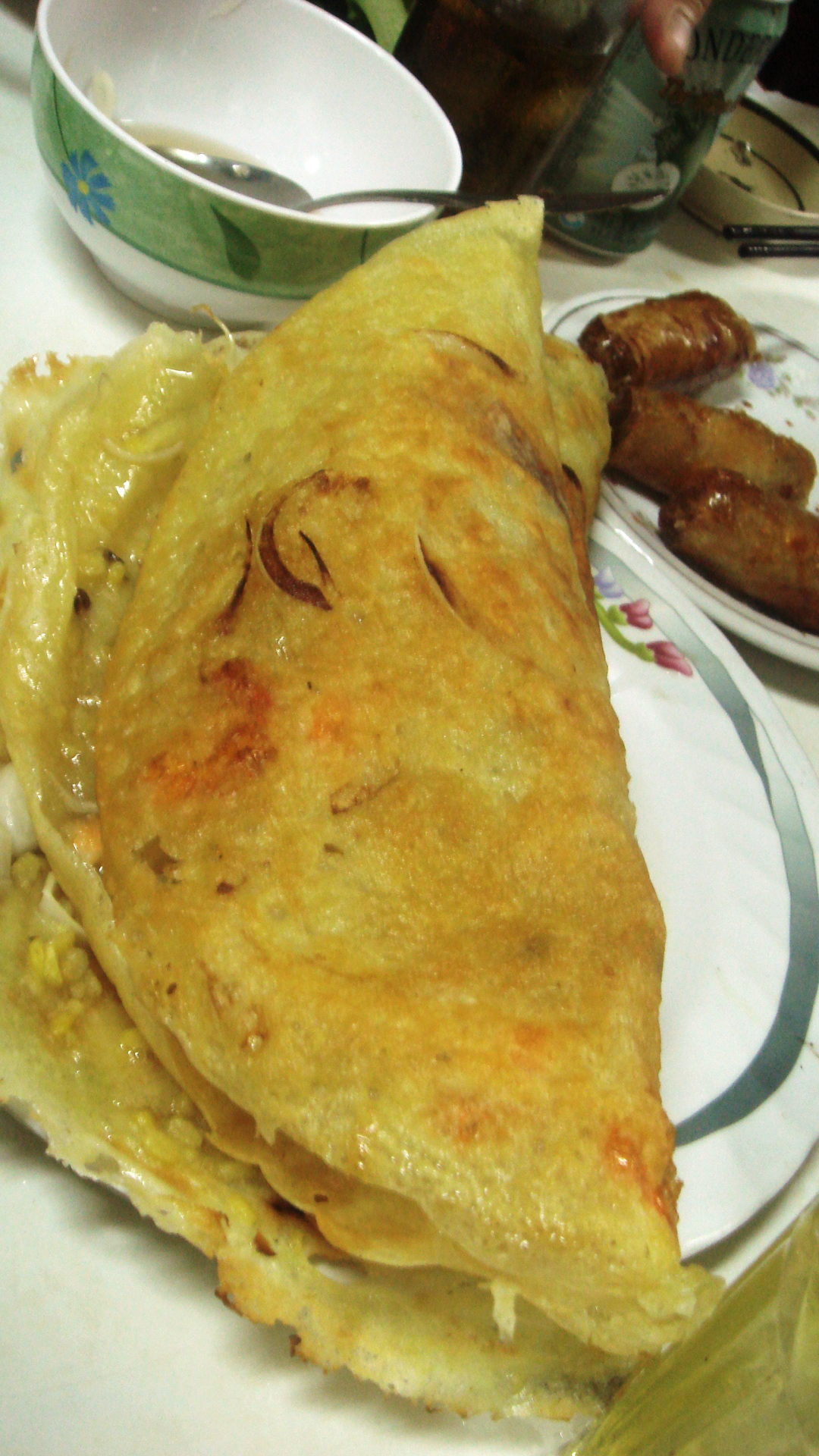
Bánh xèo

- Bánh bèo – small steamed savory rice cakes
- Bánh căn – a southern specialty consisting of small pancakes made from rice batter cooked in small clay pans
- Bánh đúc, rice cake or corn cake is eaten as a dessert or savory meal
- Bánh rế – deep-fried pancake
- Bánh khọt – a southern specialty consisting of small, fried rice flour pancakes
- Bánh xèo– a fried rice cake with shrimp and pork
- Bánh bột chiên – fried rice cakes with eggs

=== Rolls ===
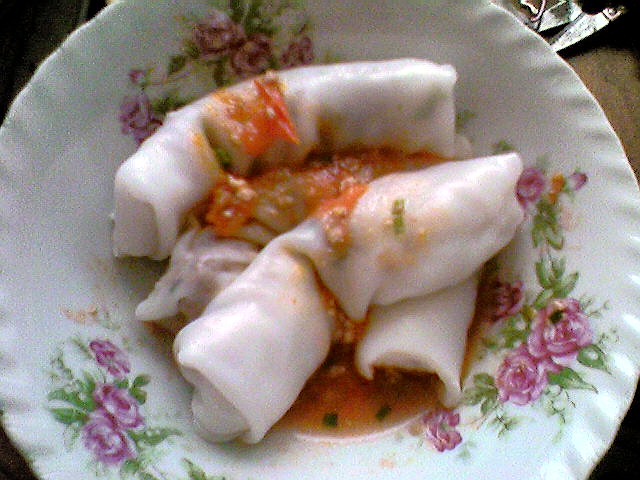
Bánh cuốn

- Bánh cuốn – steamed rice roll
- Bánh tôm – shrimp patties
  - Bánh tôm Hồ Tây – a shrimp patty made from deep fried julienned sweet potatoes – specialty originating from the area around West Lake (Tay Ho), Hanoi

=== Rice paper ===
- Bánh tráng – rice paper
- Bánh ướt – steamed rice paper

=== Breads and sandwiches ===
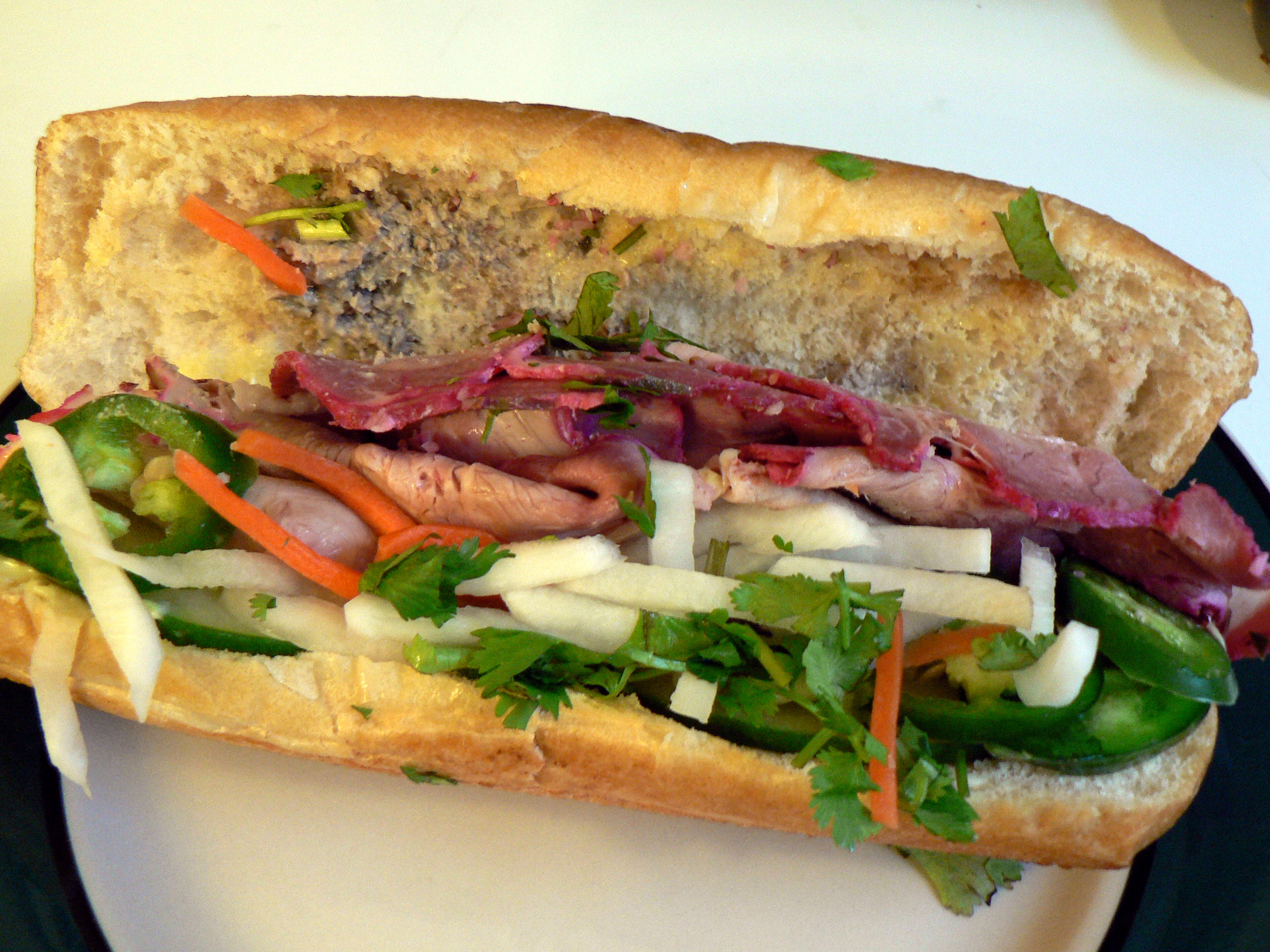
Bánh mì

- Bánh mì – refers to both bread and the Vietnamese baguette
- Bánh mì Pháp – baguette
- Bánh mì Việt Nam – specifically a Vietnamese-style baguette

=== Sweet cakes ===
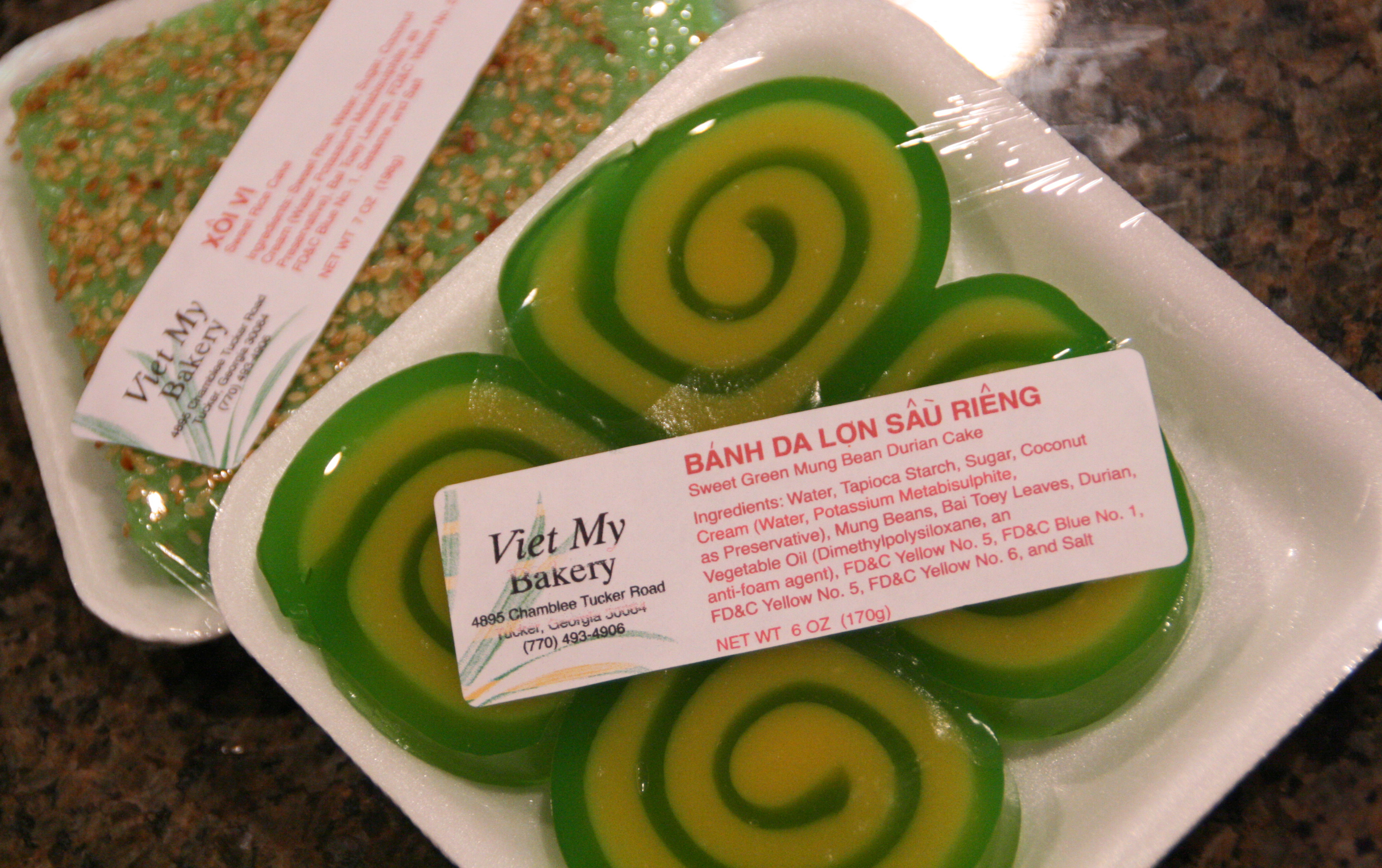
Durian green leaf cake Bánh da lợn sầu riêng

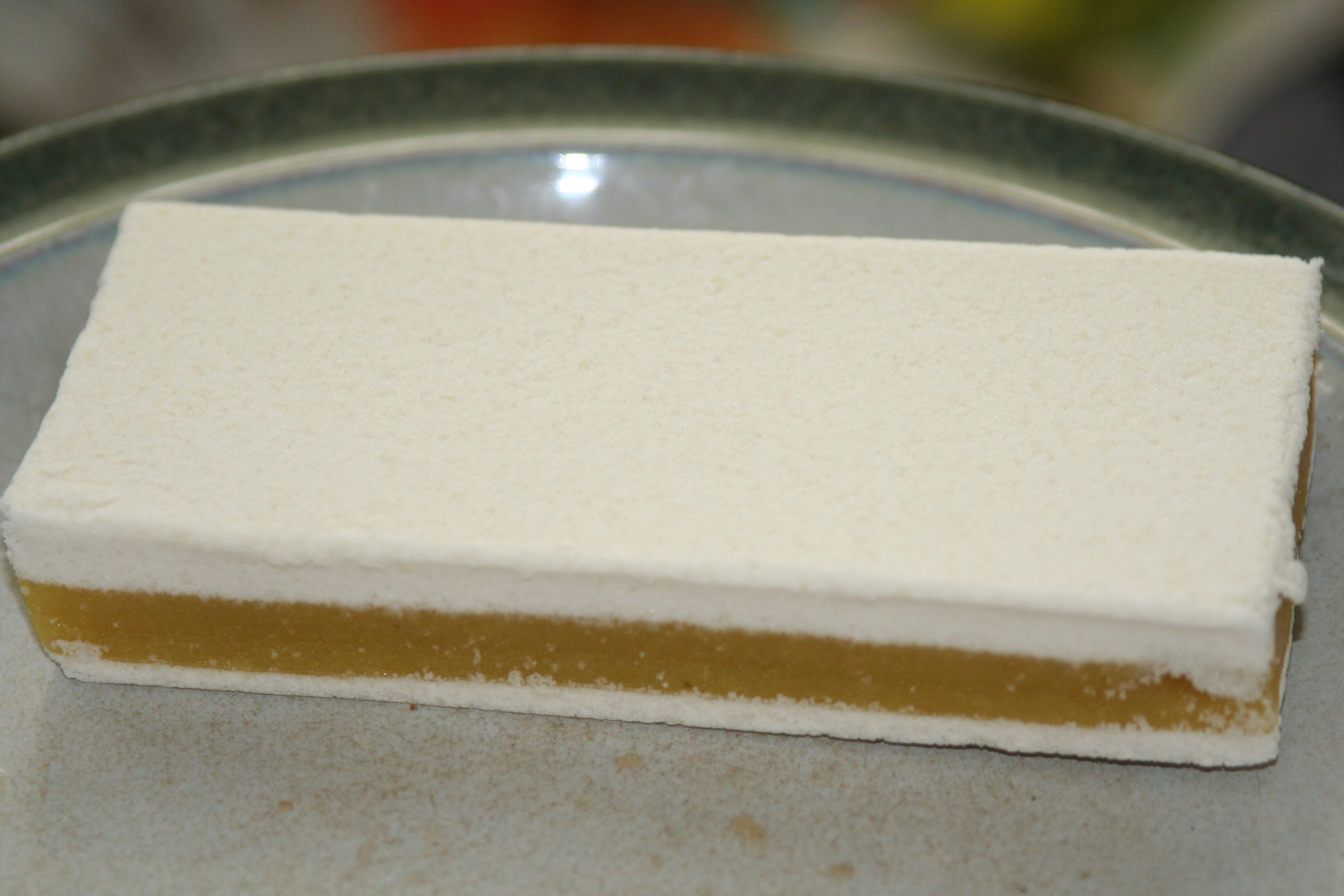
Bánh in nhân sầu riêng Sweet Rice Flour, Mung Bean and Durian Cake

- Bánh bò – "cow cake," made from glutinous rice flour and coconut milk, with a honeycomb-like texture
  - Bánh Bò Rễ Tre (Steamed Rice Cakes, Vietnamese Bak Tong Koh)
  - Bánh Bò Khoai Lang (Sweet Potato Fatt Koh)
  - Bánh Bò Lá Dứa – Pandan Coconut "Bak Tong Koh
  - Bánh Bò Mã Lai – Hong Kong Style Malaysian Steamed Sponge Cake
  - Bánh Bò Nướng – Vietnamese Baked Honey Comb Cake
  - Bánh Bò Nướng Chay – a vegetarian version of bánh bò nướng
- Bánh cáy, rectangular-shaped sweet dessert made by roasting and grinding glutinous rice and other ingredients
- Bánh da lợn – colored steamed layer cake made from tapioca starch, rice flour, coconut milk or water, sugar, and other ingredients
- Bánh đúc – rice cake or corn cake eaten as a dessert or savory meal
- Bánh chuối – banana cake
- Bánh gối – a type of bread originating from Chinese fried dumpling
- Bánh khảo – a sweet cake made from glutinous rice flour and sugar
  - Bánh khảo sữa – a sweet cake made from glutinous rice flour, sugar, and milk powder
- Bánh khoai mì – sweet cassava cake
- Bánh khoai môn – taro cake
- Bánh tiêu – hollow donuts
- Bánh trung thu – mooncake

=== Dishes for special occasions ===
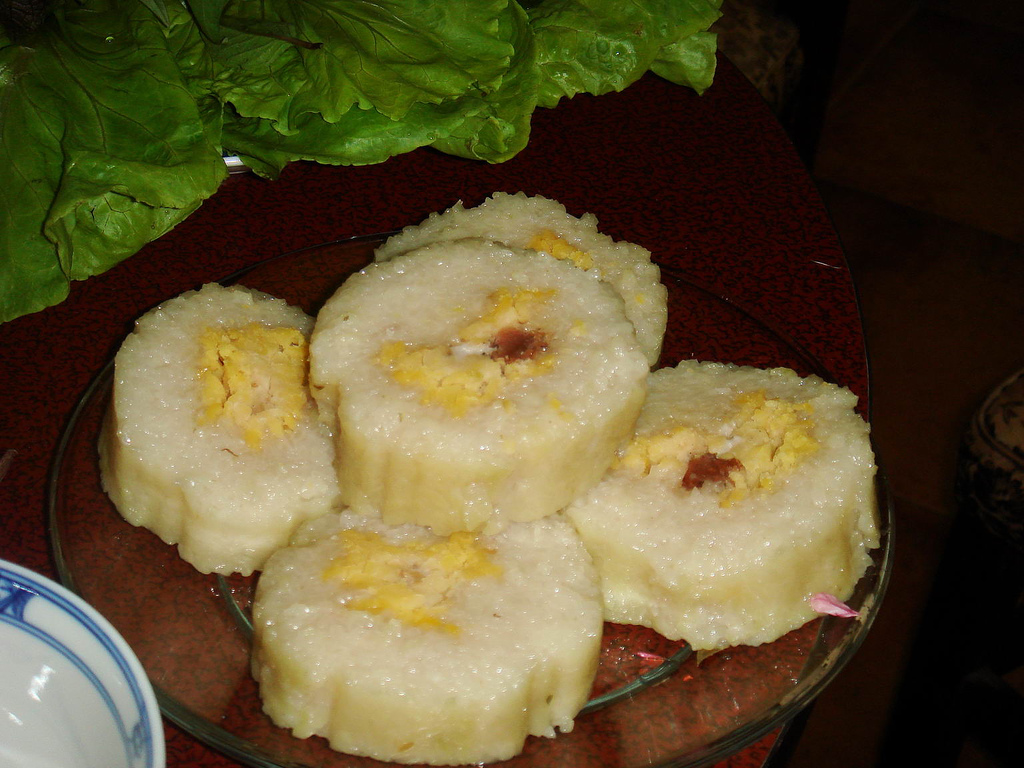
A plate of bánh tét, with mung bean paste filling

- Bánh chưng – square-shaped steamed glutinous rice dumpling wrapped in a dong leaf (lá dong)
- Bánh tét – log-shaped cylindrical glutinous rice cake, wrapped in a banana leaf and filled with a meat or vegetarian filling
- Bánh trôi (lit. 'floating rice cake') – served together with bánh chay
- Bánh tổ – a round, golden/taupe colored, sticky cake served for new years. It's made of glutinous rice flour, sugar, water, and soybean oil. Like the Chinese new year cake, nian gao, the bánh tổ is cut into thin slices then dipped in egg and fried before serving. This is an uncommon pastry and it is said the shape represents a wheel. It is sometimes decorated with white sesame seeds and red food coloring. (cf. kue keranjang in Indonesia)
- Bánh bác – a round, origin Hoài Đức district, Hanoi

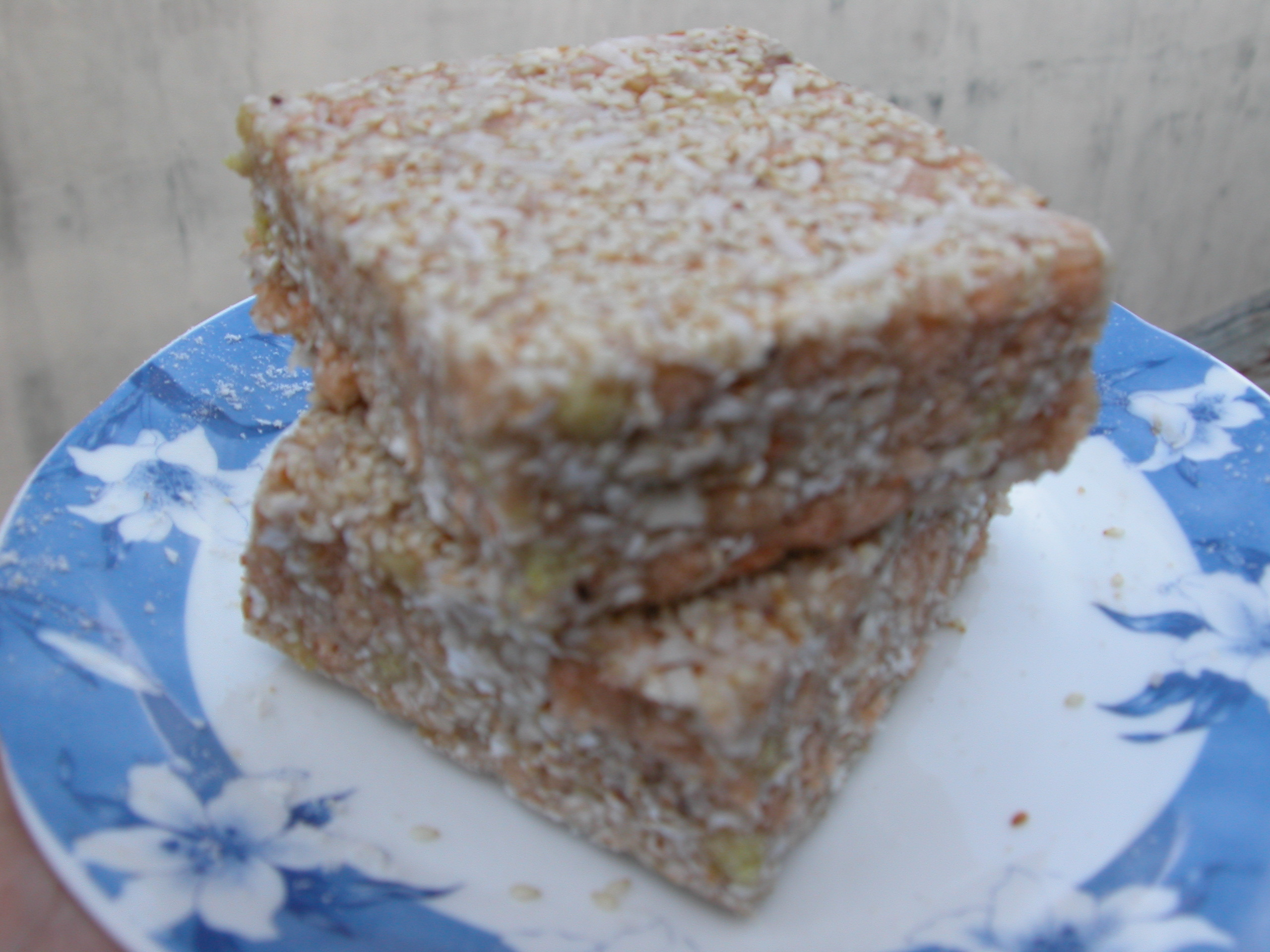
Bánh cáy

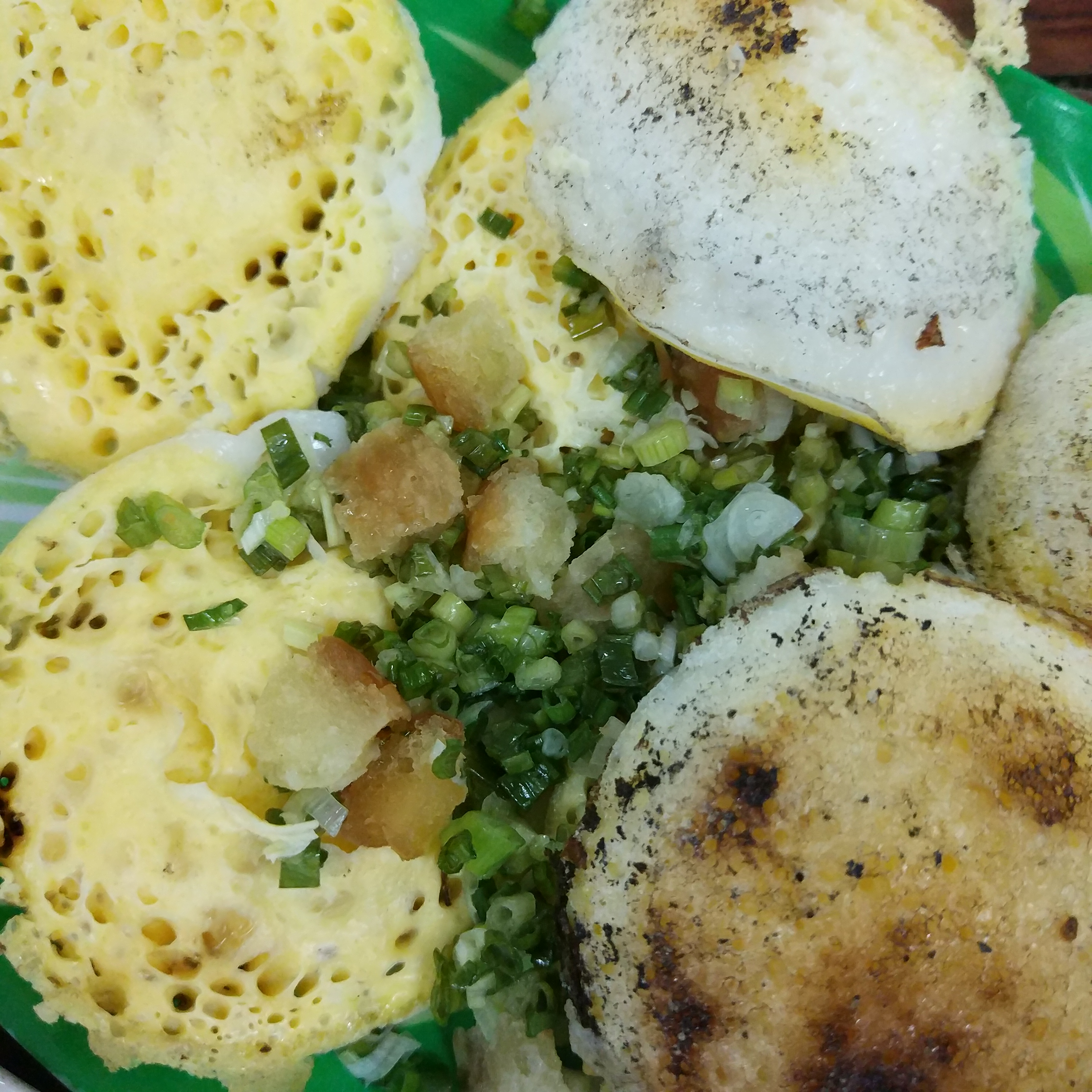
Bánh căn (can pancake) in Phan Rang, Vietnam.

=== Others ===
- Bánh bông lan, called bánh gatô in northern Vietnam – sponge cake
  - Bánh Bông Lan Bơ – Fruit/Butter Cake
  - Bánh Bông Lan Cuốn – Swiss Roll
  - Bánh Bông Lan Phú Sĩ – Mountain Fuji Cake
  - Bánh Bông Lan Rễ Tre – Honeycomb Sponge Cake
- Bánh chay – served together with bánh trôi
- Bánh cốm – green rice cake made using cốm with mung bean filling
- Bánh cuốn
- Bánh cáy
- Bánh căn
- Bánh đa (Northern) or Bánh tráng nướng (Southern)- rice cracker
- Bánh đậu xanh – sweet mung bean paste
- Bánh dừa
- Bánh gai – made from the leaves of the "gai" tree (Boehmeria nivea) dried, boiled, ground into small pieces, then mixed with glutinous rice, wrapped in banana leaf. The filling is made from a mixture of coconut, mung bean, peanuts, winter melon, sesame, and lotus seeds. Thanh Hóa province is famous for its bánh gai Tứ Trụ.
- Bánh giầy, also written as bánh dầy – white, flat, round glutinous rice cake with tough, chewy texture filled with mung bean or served with Vietnamese sausage (Giò lụa)
- Bánh giò – pyramid shaped rice dough dumplings filled with pork, shallot, and wood ear mushroom wrapped in banana leaf
- Bánh hoa hồng – rice cake that is shaped like a flower and made with mung bean paste
- Bánh kẹp – Vietnamese waffle cookies made from rice flour, like a pizzelle
  - Bánh kẹp lá dứa – pandan waffle
- Bánh mật – Molasses-sweetened glutinous rice cake – filled with green bean paste or groundnut
- Bánh lá dừa – Cake wrapped in coconut leaf
- Bánh phồng tôm – prawn crackers
- Bánh phục linh – cookies made from tapioca flour, coconut milk, and sugar
- Chè lam Phủ Quảng
- Bánh quế
- Bánh tráng mè
- Bánh bà lai hoa hồng
- Bánh xếp bột gạo
- Bánh xếp bột loc
- Bánh bèo ngọt
- Bánh bèo nhân tôm thịt
- Bánh bèo xiêm
- Bánh tầm bì
- Bánh bao ca dé – Coconut Custard Bao
- Bánh pía – a Teochew Pastry
- Bánh Chuối Hấp – Steamed Banana Cake
- Bánh Chuối Nướng – Baked Banana Bread Pudding
- Bánh Đập – Rice crackers stuck together
- Bánh Dẻo – Vietnamese Ping Pei Mooncakes
- Bánh Dẻo Cuộn – Ping Pei Rolls
- Bánh Flan – crème caramel
- Bánh Gan – "Liver" Cake
- Bánh Hạnh Nhân – Vietnamese Almond/Peanut Cookies
- Bánh Hoa Mai/Hoa Đào – Cherry/Plum Blossom Cookies
- Bánh Hoa Sen – Lotus Pastries
- Bánh in – Print Cakes
- Bánh Men – Yeast Cookies
- Bánh Quai Vạc – Coconut/Mung Bean Puffs
- Bánh Quế/Bánh Kẹp – Vietnamese Love Letters
- Bánh Sát Phu – Husband Killers
- Bánh Thuẫn Hấp – Steamed Cup Cakes
- Bánh Ú Nước Tro – Lye Water Dumplings
- Bánh Bao Nương Nhân Xá Xíu – baked char siu bao
- Bào Ngư Xào Nấm Đông Cô – Braised Shitake Mushrooms with Abalone
- Bánh Hoa Hồng – Rose Dumplings
- Bánh Khoai Môn Tàn Ong – Dim sum Taro Puffs
- Bánh Mì Chiên – Fried Baguettes
- Bánh Mì Hấp – Steamed Baguettes
- Bánh patê sô – A French-inspired meat-filled pastry. Characterized by flaky crust and either pork or chicken as the filling.
- Bánh Phồng Tôm – Shrimp Crackers/Chips
- Bánh trôi nước

== See also ==
- Bánh at Vietnamese Wikipedia
- Bing (Chinese flatbread)
- Mochi
- Mont
- List of steamed foods
- Vietnamese cuisine
