= Gà nướng sả =

Vietnamese lemongrass chicken

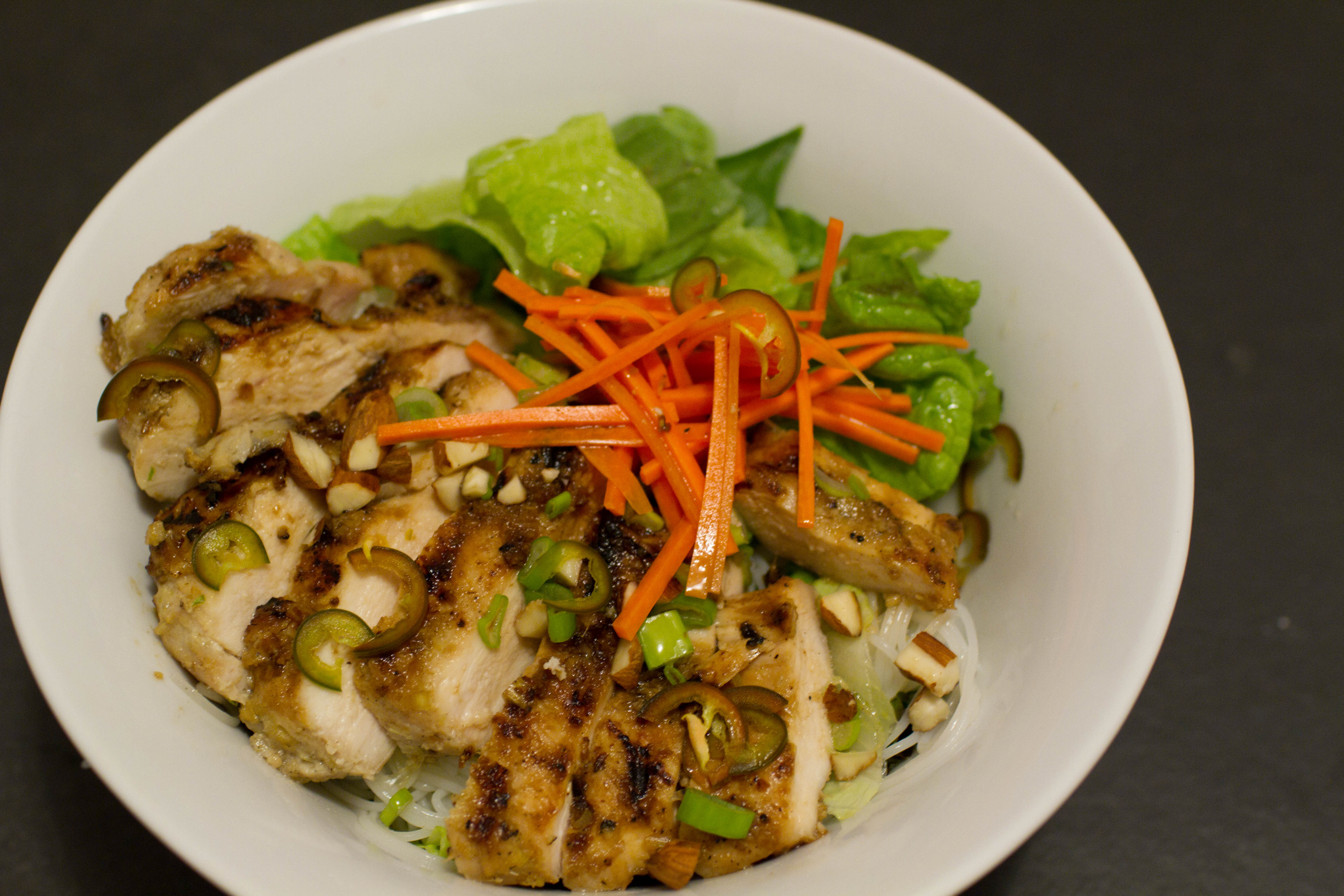
Bún with Gà nướng sả (lemongrass chicken)

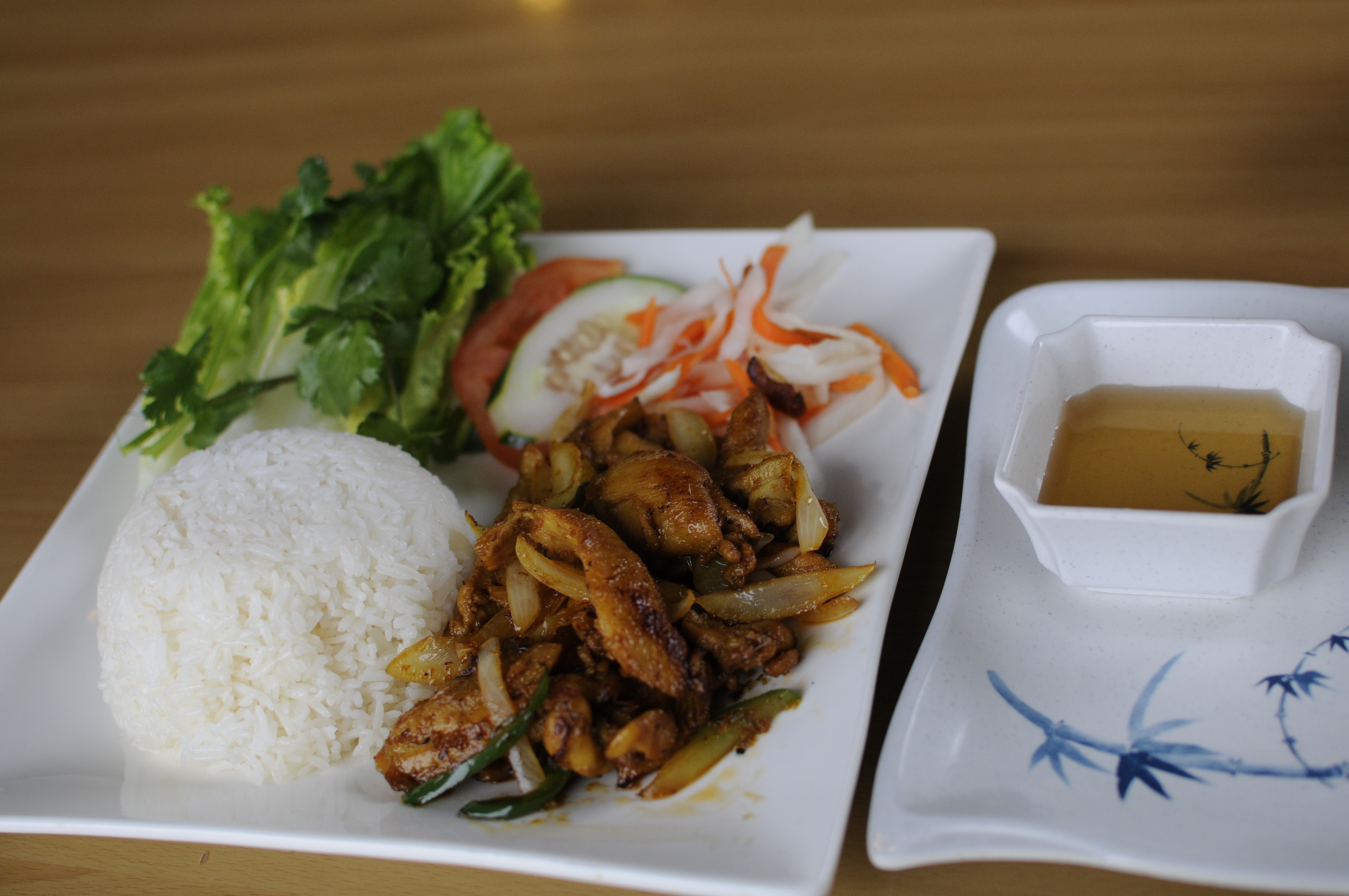
Gà nướng sả at Quan Nem Ninh Hoa, Sacramento

In Vietnamese cuisine, Gà nướng sả is grilled chicken with lemon grass (sả). Common ingredients include garlic, onion, honey, sugar or pepper. Grilled beef and other meats are also popular variations.

== See also ==
- List of Vietnamese dishes
