= Bánh cáy =

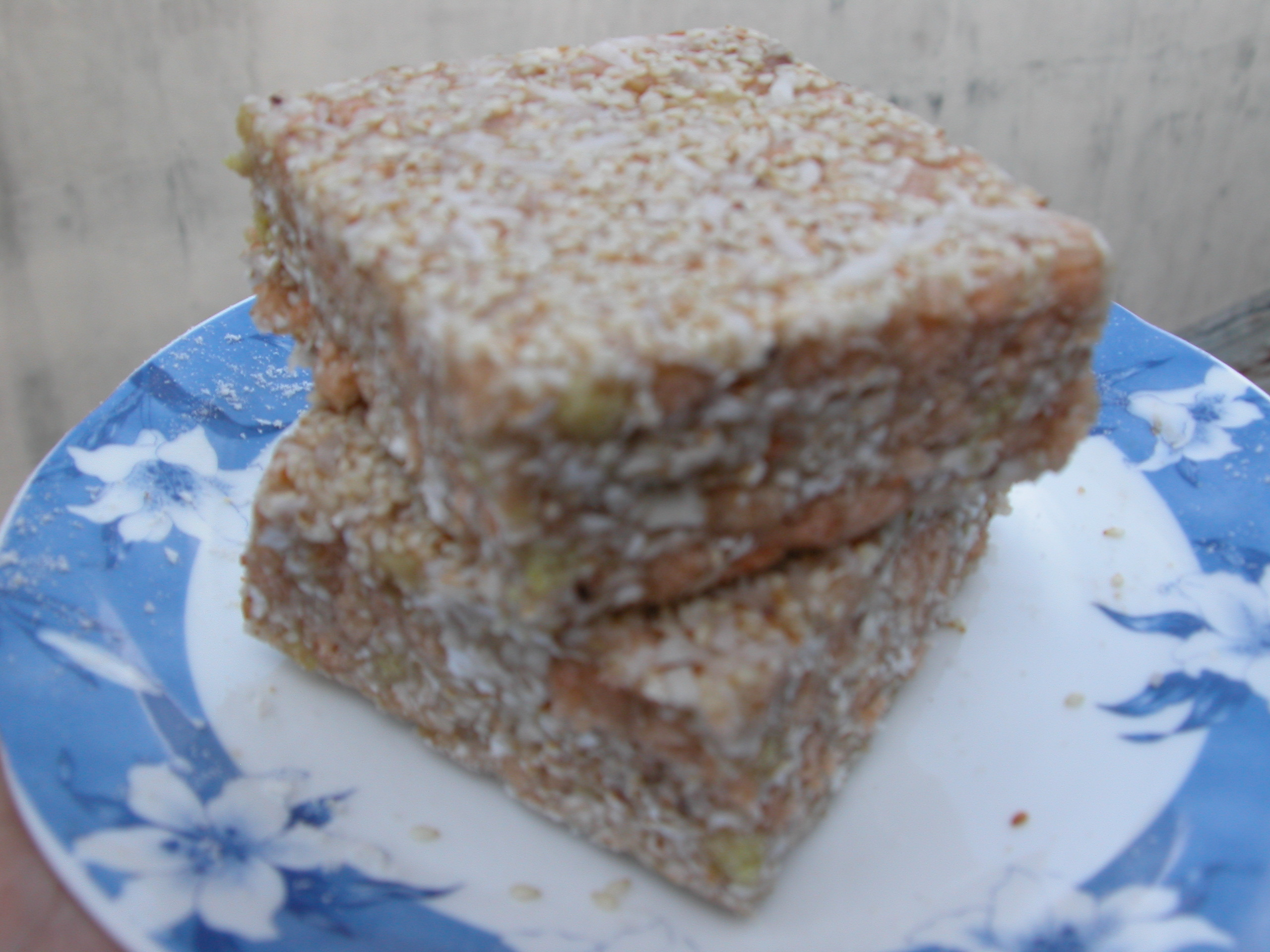
- Bánh cáy
- Type: Traditional rice cake
- Course: Dessert
- Place of origin: Vietnam
- Region or state: Thái Bình Province of northern Vietnam
- Serving temperature: Room temperature
- Main ingredients: Glutinous rice, malt syrup, sugar, peanuts, sesame seeds, candied fruits

Bánh cáy is a variety of Vietnamese bánh (translates loosely as "cake" or "bread") made in the Thái Bình Province of northern Vietnam. It is made of sticky rice, sugar, gac or gardenia, sesame, carrots, mandarin orange peel, and lard. The mixture is roasted and ground, then put into a square box. It resembles the eggs of the con cáy, a small crab in northern Vietnam which lives in rivers and rice paddies, from which this bánh derives its name. Bánh cáy is traditionally served with tea.

== See also ==
- Bánh giầy
- Bánh chưng
- Bánh xu xê
