= Bánh căn =

Traditional Vietnamese rice flour pancake

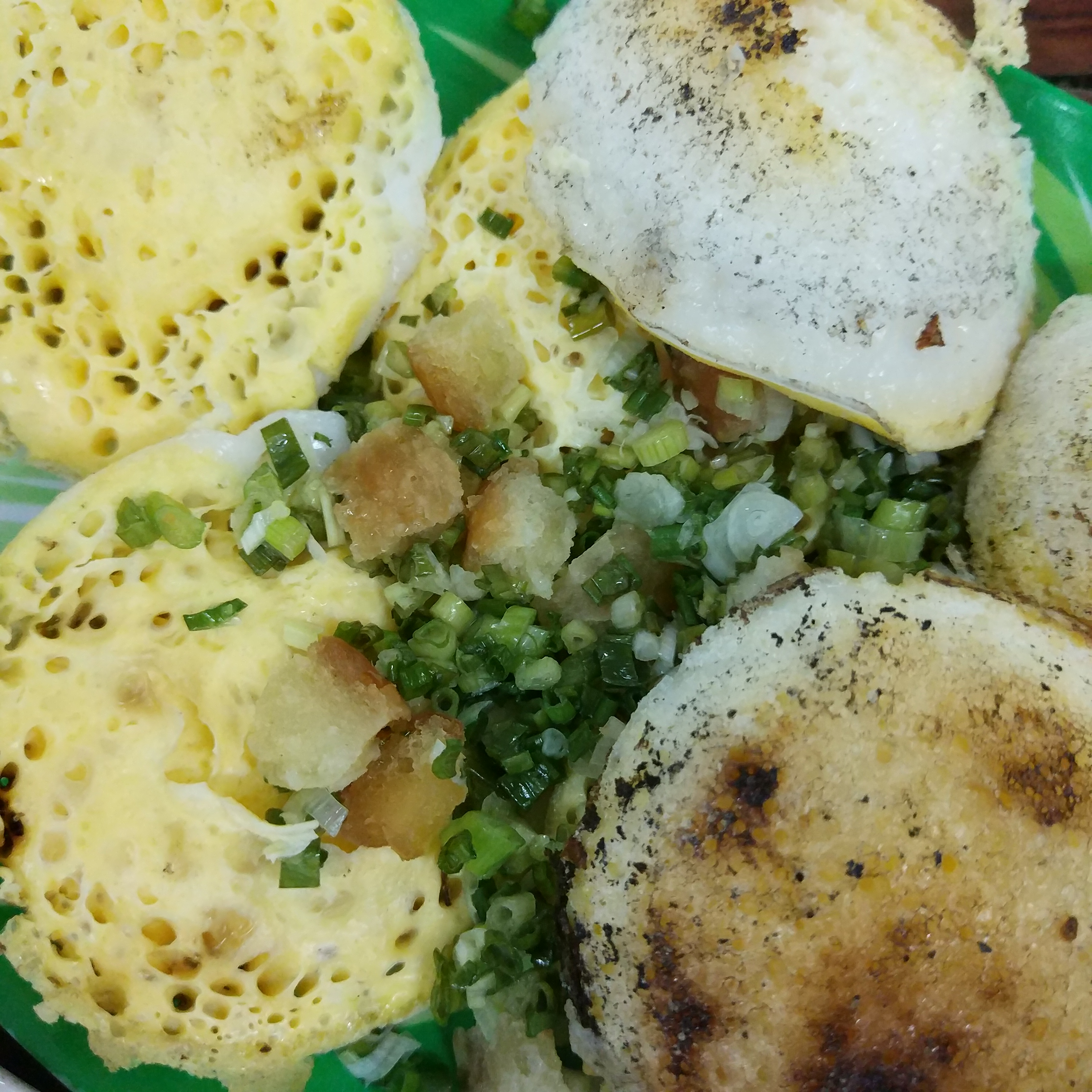
Bánh căn in Phan Rang, Vietnam.

Bánh căn (lit. 'căn cake' or 'small cake') is a pancake-like cake made from rice flour, water, and turmeric. It's cooked in a special cast-iron pan or traditional clay pan with round molds and served with toppings like shrimp, pork, and eggs. It's a popular cake in southern Vietnam, particularly in the provinces of Ninh Thuận (now Khánh Hoà) and Bình Thuận (now Lâm Đồng), as well as in the former city of Đà Lạt.

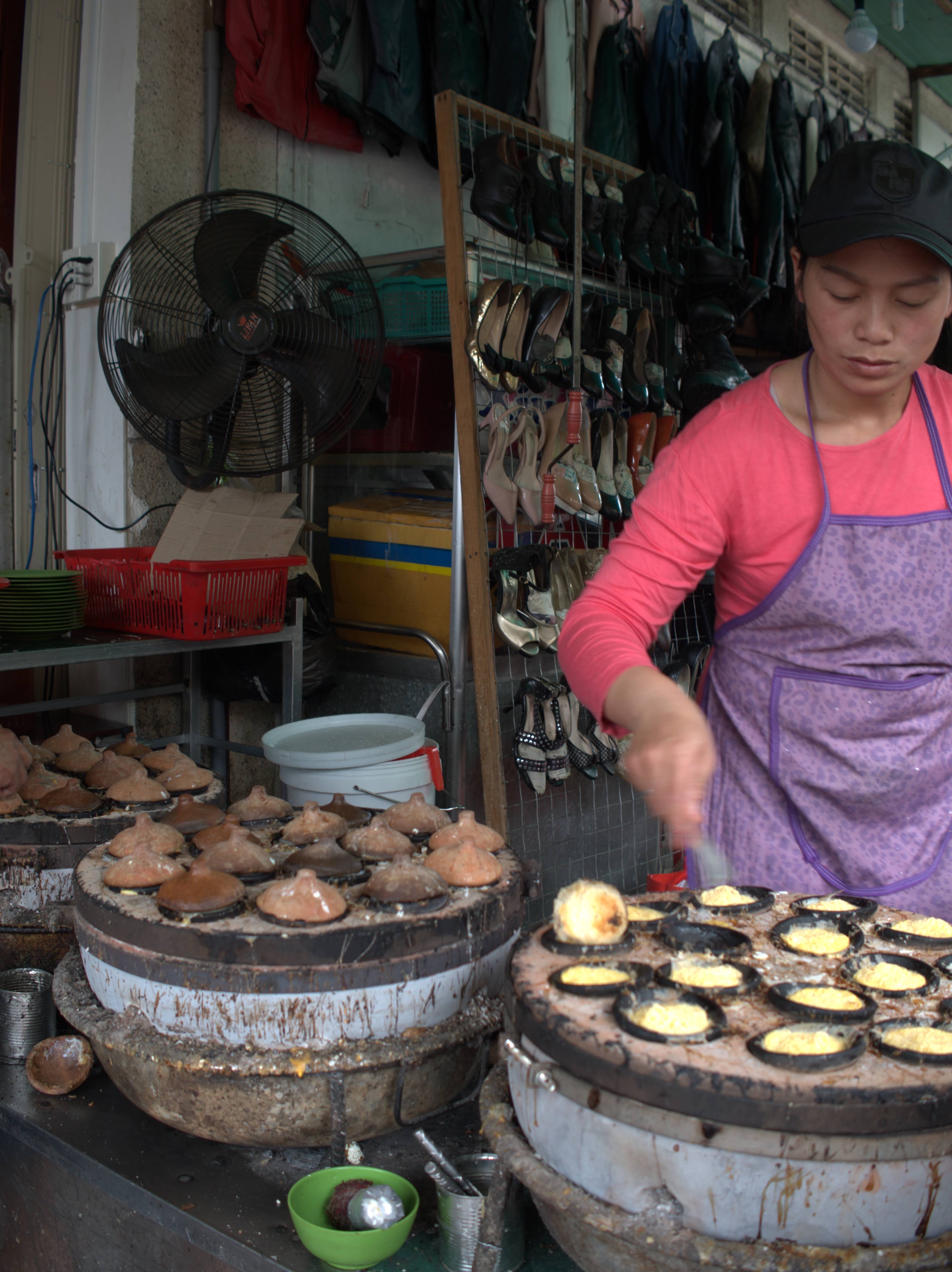
A woman cooking bánh căn in Đà Lạt, Vietnam.

The origin of bánh căn is unclear, but it is believed to have originated from the Cham people who lived in the province of Ninh Thuận. To make Bánh căn, the cook would begin by creating a rice flour batter, which is then poured into a pan fired with charcoal. The cooked mini cake is then topped with shrimp, scallions, pork, diced fried bread, quail eggs, or other regional ingredients.

These cakes are originally served with various dripping sauce like: fish soup, fermented fish sauce, mixed fish sauce or meatball sauce on the side, accompanied by an assortment of chả, pounded chilis, minced mango, fresh herbs and leafy vegetables intended to be used as wrappers.
