= Bánh bột chiên =

Fried rice flour cakes

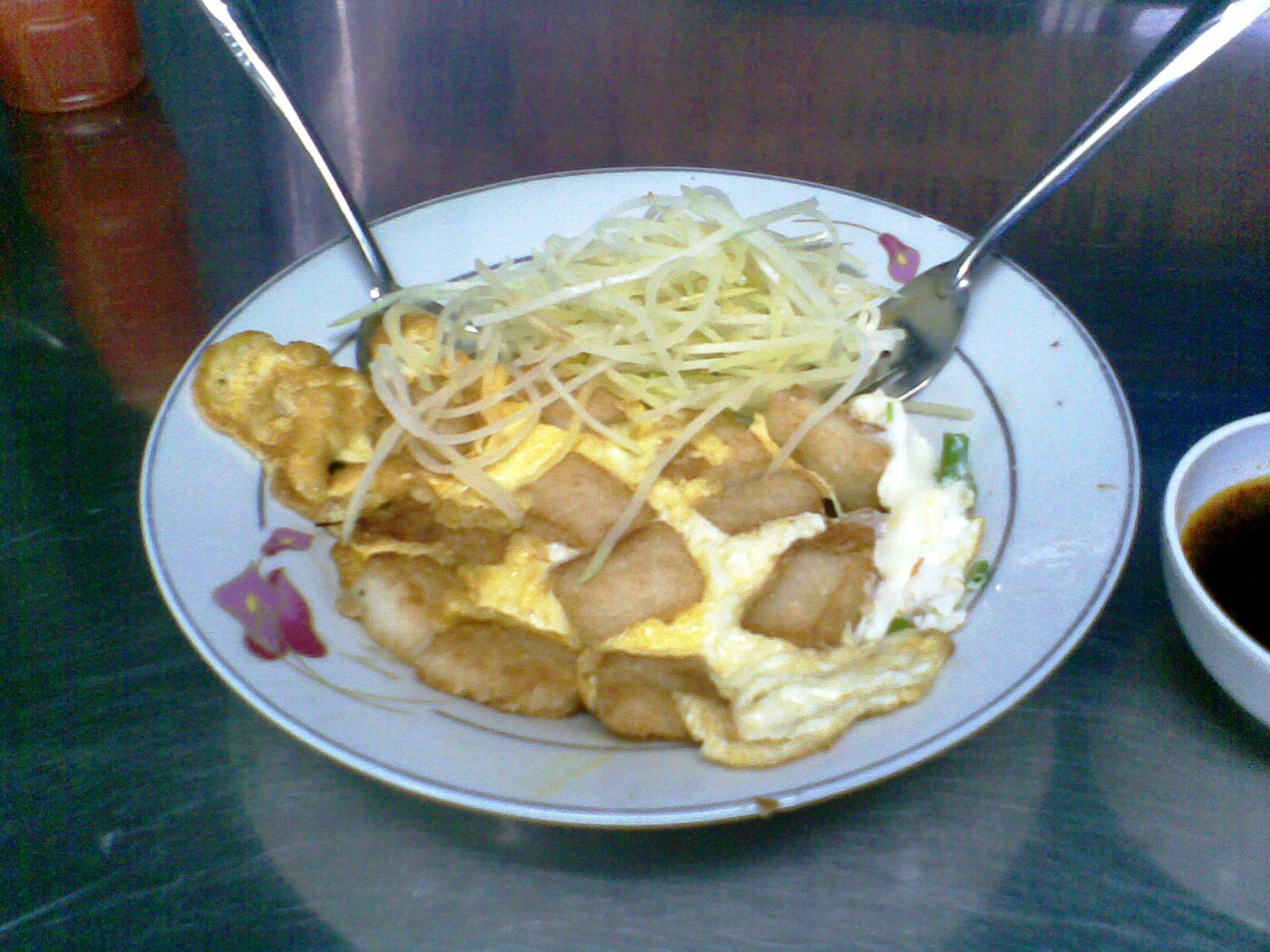
- Bánh bột chiên served with fried egg, scallions, and pickled papaya
- Alternative names: Fried rice flour cake
- Type: Street food
- Course: Snack
- Place of origin: Vietnam
- Region or state: Southern Vietnam
- Serving temperature: Hot
- Main ingredients: Rice flour, tapioca starch, eggs, scallions, soy sauce, pickled papaya

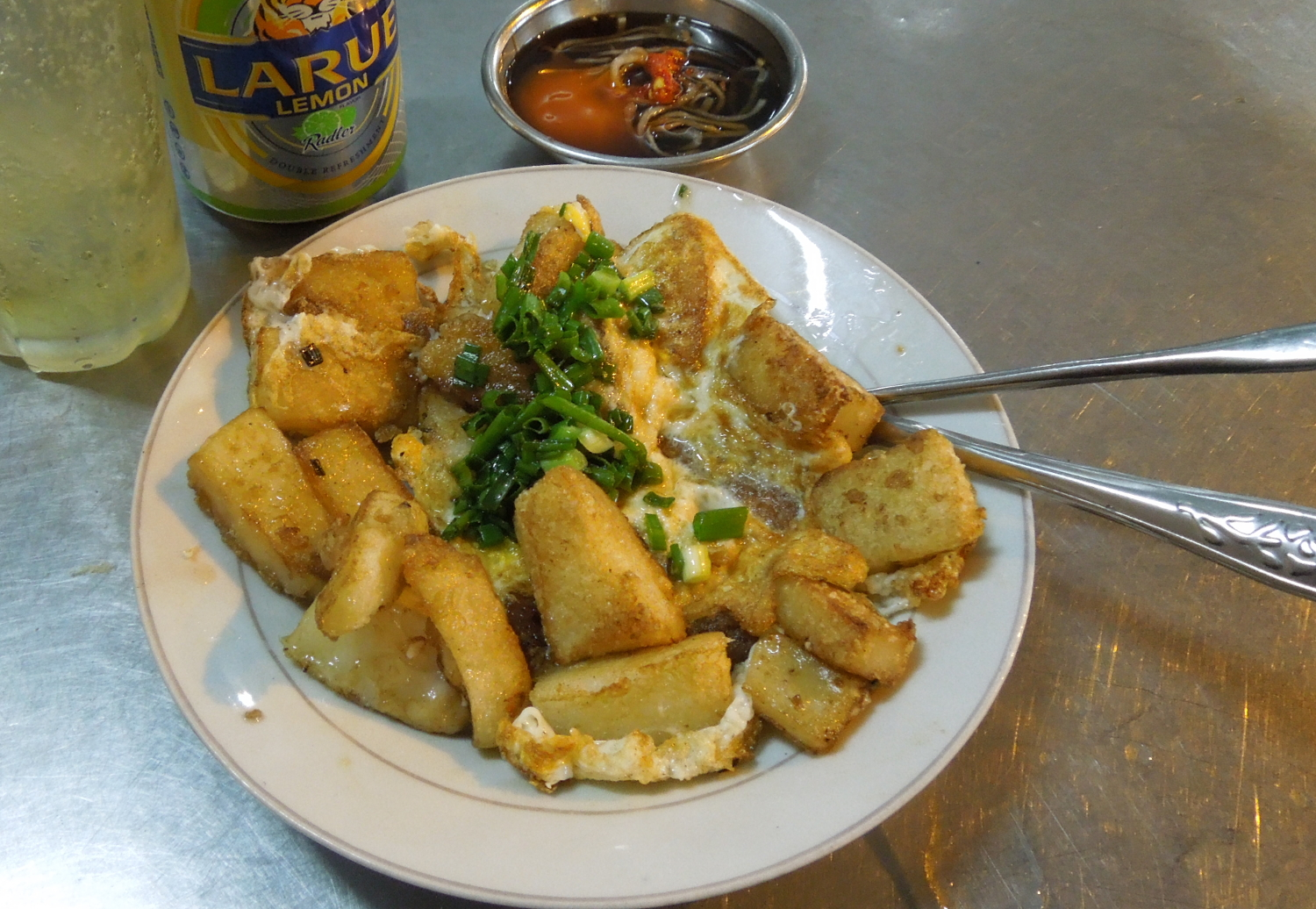
Vietnam "bot chien" (fried rice cake), served with fried spring onions, omelette, a side of sweet soy sauce, and a beer.

In Vietnamese cuisine, bánh bột chiên are fried rice flour cakes. It is a Chinese-influenced rice flour based dish, which exists in many versions all over Asia; the Vietnamese version features a tangy soy sauce (soy sauce, vinegar, sugar, optional chili) on the side, rice flour cubes with fried eggs (either duck or chicken), and some vegetables. This is a popular after-school snack for young students in southern regions of Vietnam.

== See also ==
- Turnip cake
- Chai tow kway
- Bánh
- List of cakes
