= Bánh đúc =

Vietnamese rice dishes

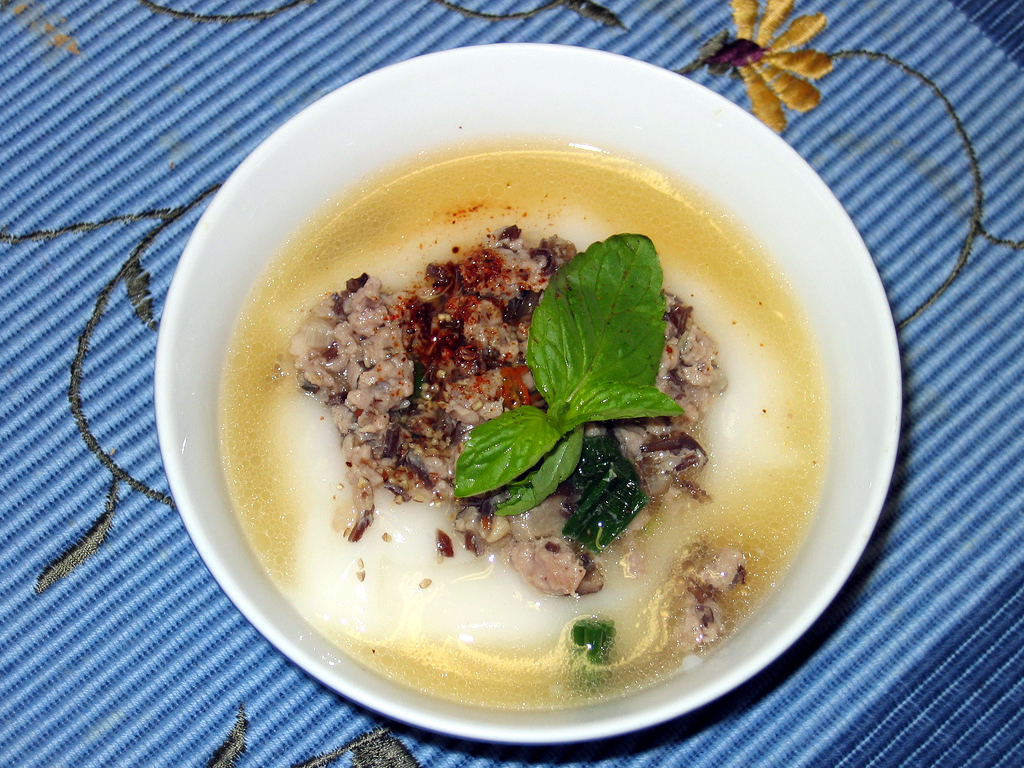
- A bowl of northern Vietnamese bánh đúc thịt (bánh đúc with ground pork and fish sauce)
- Course: Snack
- Place of origin: Vietnam
- Region or state: Southeast Asia
- Main ingredients: Rice flour and slaked lime
- Variations: Bánh bèo, Bánh nậm

Bánh đúc is a Vietnamese bánh (cake). There are two main types of bánh đúc, the white Northern Vietnamese cake and the green Southern version. This cake is also considered a local food of Trat, a small province located at the easternmost tip of Thailand. Bánh đúc is also found in Cambodia.

== Northern Vietnamese version ==
In northern Vietnam, bánh đúc is a cake made from either non-glutinous rice flour or corn flour. It is white in color and has a soft texture and mild flavour. It is typically garnished with savory ingredients such as ground pork, tôm chấy (grilled ground shrimp), fried onions, sesame seeds, salt, peanuts, lime juice, and soy sauce or fish sauce. Although it may be eaten on its own, it may also be served hot, accompanied by steamed meat or mushrooms.

Bánh đúc is available at small stalls and is eaten throughout the day.

== Southern Vietnamese version ==
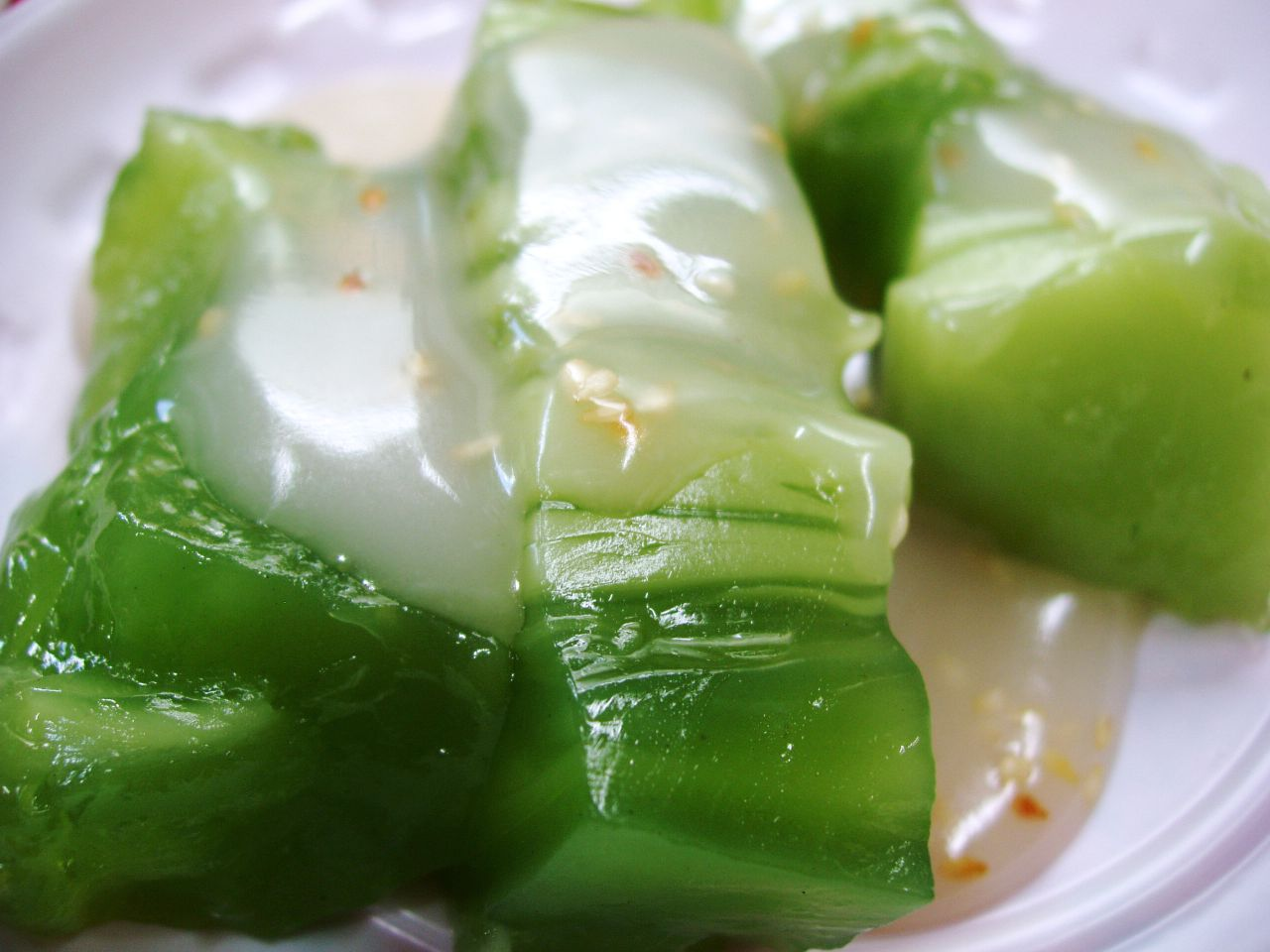
A plate of southern Vietnamese bánh đúc colored with Pandanus amaryllifolius leaf extract, and topped with sweetened coconut milk and sesame seeds

In southern Vietnam, bánh đúc is a dessert made from non-glutinous rice flour. It takes the form of gelatinous blocks that are often colored green by the addition of Pandan leaf extract. It is cooked by boiling the ingredients and allowing them to cool, solidifying into a jelly-like sheet that is then cut into blocks.

== Varieties ==
- Bánh đúc bột gạo – made from (non-glutinous) rice flour
- Bánh đúc bột năng dòn trong
- Bánh đúc vân đá cẩm thạch – veined coloration resembles marble
- Bánh đúc gạo – made from (non-glutinous) rice
- Bánh đúc khoai môn – made with taro
- Bánh đúc mặn – made with pork or shrimp
- Bánh đúc miền trung – made in the central region of Vietnam
- Bánh đúc ngô – made from maize
- Bánh đúc nộm – bánh đúc salad
- Bánh đúc nóng – hot bánh đúc
- Bánh đúc nước dừa – made with coconut milk
- Bánh đúc nước cốt dừa – made with coconut juice
- Bánh đúc sốt – steaming hot bánh đúc
- Bánh đúc xanh – literally "green bánh đúc"; made with Pandanus amaryllifolius leaf extract

== Sayings ==
The Vietnamese people have a saying:

Mấy đời bánh đúc có xương, mấy đời dì ghẻ lại thương con chồng.

The literal meaning is: "bones are never found in bánh đúc, just like a stepmother never loves her husband's own children." This couplet is used to describe something very unlikely to happen.

== See also ==
- Bánh da lợn
- Pandan cake
- Bánh
