= Bánh bèo =

Vietnamese dish

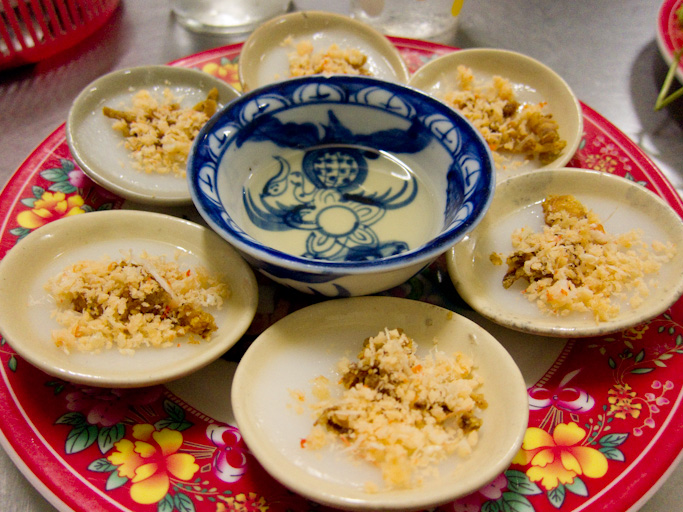
- Small dishes of bánh bèo
- Course: Snack
- Place of origin: Vietnam
- Region or state: Regions of Vietnam
- Main ingredients: Rice flour and tapioca flour
- Similar dishes: Bánh đúc, Bánh nậm

Bánh bèo is a Vietnamese dish originating from Huế, a city in Central Vietnam. The name is sometimes translated as "water fern cake", though "fern-shaped cake" is a more accurate rendering: the plant referenced is a small, round-leaved aquatic plant resembling duckweed or water lily, whose appearance the steamed cake imitates.

== Etymology ==
The dish's name combines bánh, a Vietnamese term loosely meaning "cake" and applied to a wide range of rice-flour preparations, with bèo, a word for the small floating aquatic plants common on ponds and ditches in Vietnam. The name refers to the cake's resemblance to these thin, round leaves when steamed in its individual saucer.

== Origins and history ==
Bánh bèo is associated with Huế, the imperial capital of the Nguyễn dynasty from 1802 to 1945, and is part of the city's tradition of small, delicately presented rice-flour cakes. Whether the dish itself originated in the imperial court or among commoners is disputed. Local chef and painter Boi Tran has characterized it as "just a humble snack", while restaurateurs descended from longtime Huế families argue the Nguyễn kings would have appreciated the dish's small portions and refinement. A separate theory holds that dishes traditionally served on or near banana leaves in Central Vietnam, including bánh bèo, may carry influences from the earlier Cham culture that dominated the region before Vietnamese expansion.

== Preparation ==
The cake is made from a thin batter of rice flour combined with tapioca starch (referred to historically as manioc), poured into small ceramic saucers and steamed. The saucer gives the finished cake its characteristic thin, round shape with a slight central depression. Once steamed, each cake is topped with crumbled dried shrimp, crispy fried pork skin (tép mỡ), and a drizzle of scallion oil, then served with a light dipping sauce of fish sauce thinned with sugar, water, garlic, and chili (nước chấm).

== Regional variations ==
Bánh bèo is a specialty of Central Vietnam and appears with regional variations in Huế, Đà Nẵng, Quảng Nam, and Quảng Ngãi. The Huế version is characterized by its small individual saucers and delicate shrimp-and-pork-skin topping. Bánh bèo from Quảng Ngãi is typically topped with a mixture of shrimp and pork paste. In southern Vietnam, the dish is often topped with mashed mung bean, producing a sweeter flavor profile reflecting Southern preferences.

In Huế, bánh bèo belongs to a broader family of rice cakes that includes bánh nậm (a flat rice paste steamed in banana leaf), bánh bột lọc (translucent tapioca dumplings filled with shrimp and pork), and bánh ram ít (a sticky rice dumpling served on a fried rice cracker base).

== Serving ==
Bánh bèo is most often served in the individual saucer it was steamed in, with diners scooping each cake out with a small spoon or nudging it free with a chopstick. In larger settings, the cakes are sometimes pre-arranged on a single platter for convenience. The dish is favored by Huế residents from around 3 p.m. onward as a teatime snack, though it can also serve as a light meal earlier or later in the day. It is typically paired with green or black tea, sometimes infused with ginger, or with Vietnamese iced coffee. The cakes are best eaten fresh.

== In popular culture ==
In modern Vietnamese slang, bánh bèo is used to describe young women perceived as overly feminine, delicate, or high-maintenance, an allusion to the cake's soft, yielding texture.

== See also ==
- Bánh bột lọc
- Bánh
- List of steamed foods
