= Pâté chaud =

Vietnamese savory puff pastry pie

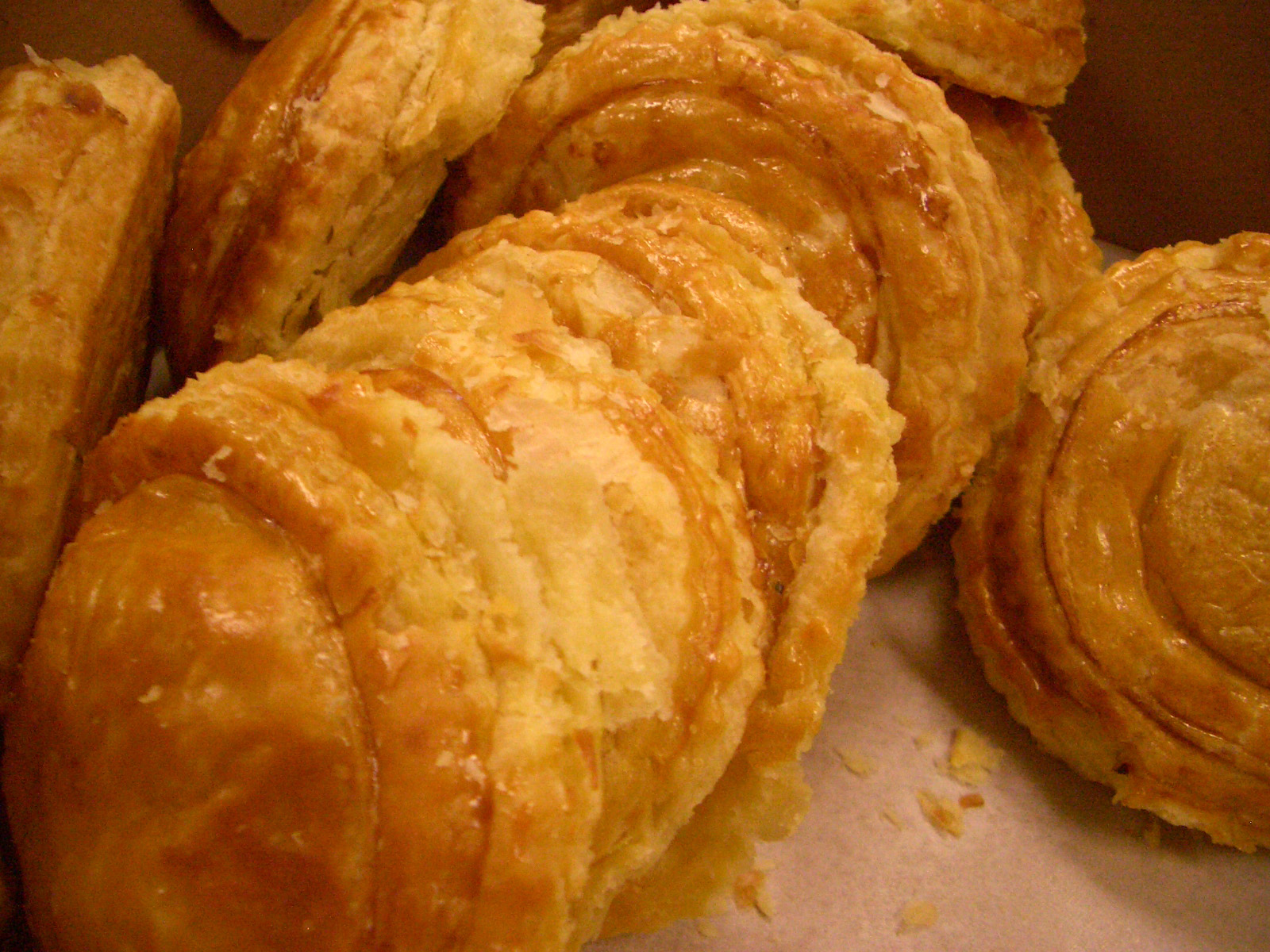
- Type: Pie
- Place of origin: Vietnam
- Main ingredients: Meat (pork, chicken, or beef), Puff pastry

Pâté chaud (French: [pate ʃo]), ("hot pastry pie"), also known as patê sô, is a Vietnamese savory puff pastry pie. The pastry is made of a light layered and flaky exterior with a meat filling. Traditionally, the filling consists of ground pork, but chicken and beef are also now commonly used. This pie is French-inspired but is now commonly found in bakeries in both Vietnam and the diaspora, much like the Haitian patty.

== Etymology ==
The masculine French noun "pâté" in combination with "chaud" (hot) was the name of the "hot pie" in French colonial Vietnam. It was the same usage as in France at the time; for example, Urbain Dubois (1818–1901), in his La Cuisine classique of 1868, describes Pâté-chaud à la Marinière as a moulded meat pie. This wording is now obsolete in modern French where a pie is designated tourte, and pâté simply means "mixture of finely chopped meat". However, the more appropriate translation for the Vietnamese bánh patê sô would be "pâté en croûte", a.k.a. "mixture of meat in crust".

== See also ==
- Vietnamese cuisine
- Puff pastry
- List of pies, tarts and flans
