= Bánh rế =

Vietnamese sweet potato pancake

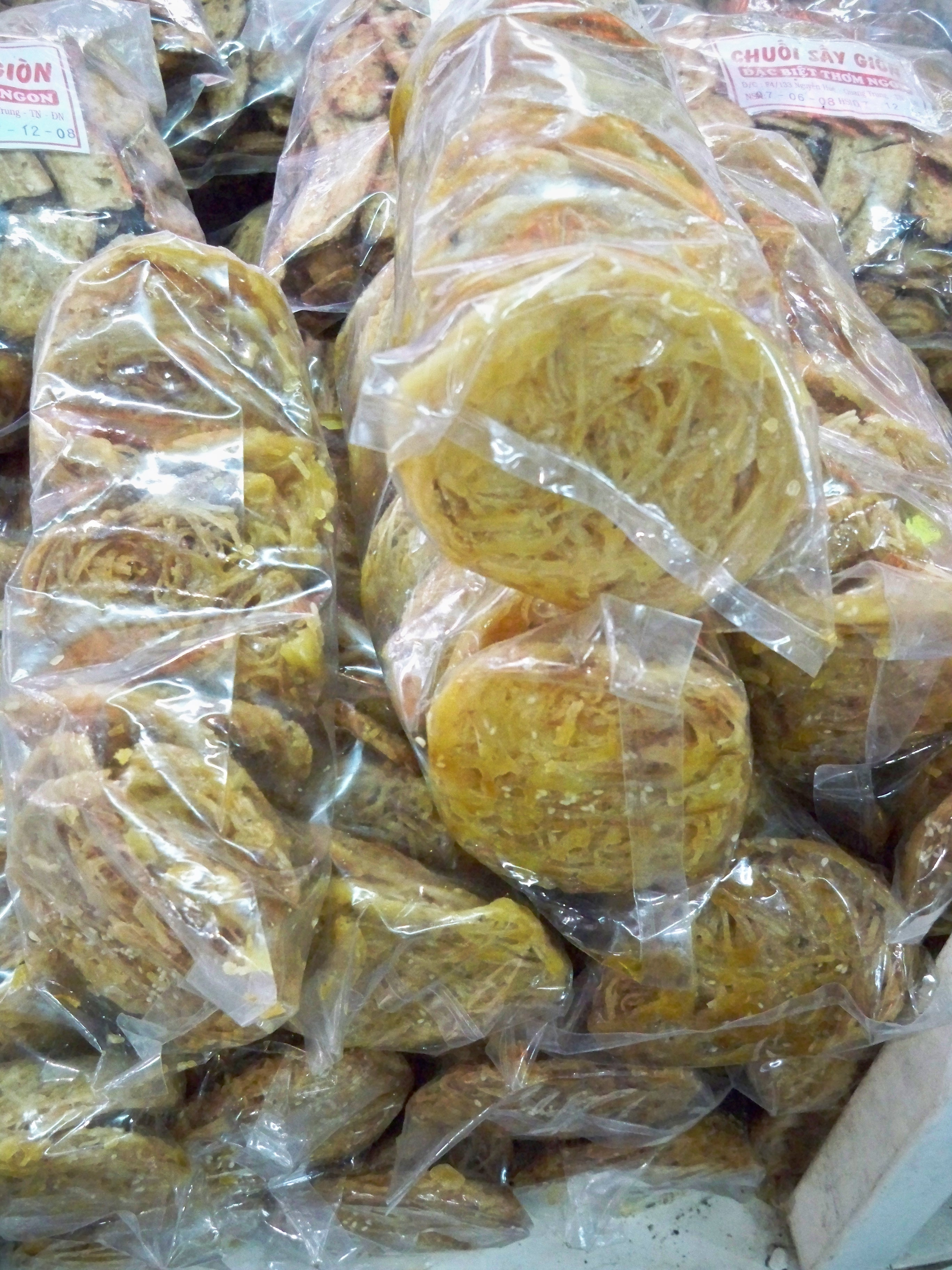
- Bánh rế (yellow)
- Type: Street food
- Place of origin: Vietnam
- Region or state: Lâm Đồng province and Khánh Hòa province
- Main ingredients: Sweet potatoes, sugar
- Variations: Cassava

Bánh rế, or Rế Cakes, are a Vietnamese street food made from sweet potatoes or cassava. The sweet potato is made into a pancake, deep-fried, then sugared. It is associated with the Lâm Đồng area. They are named after the Vietnamese term “rế”, bamboo baskets, as they look similar.

== Color variants ==
Bánh rế has two color variants:

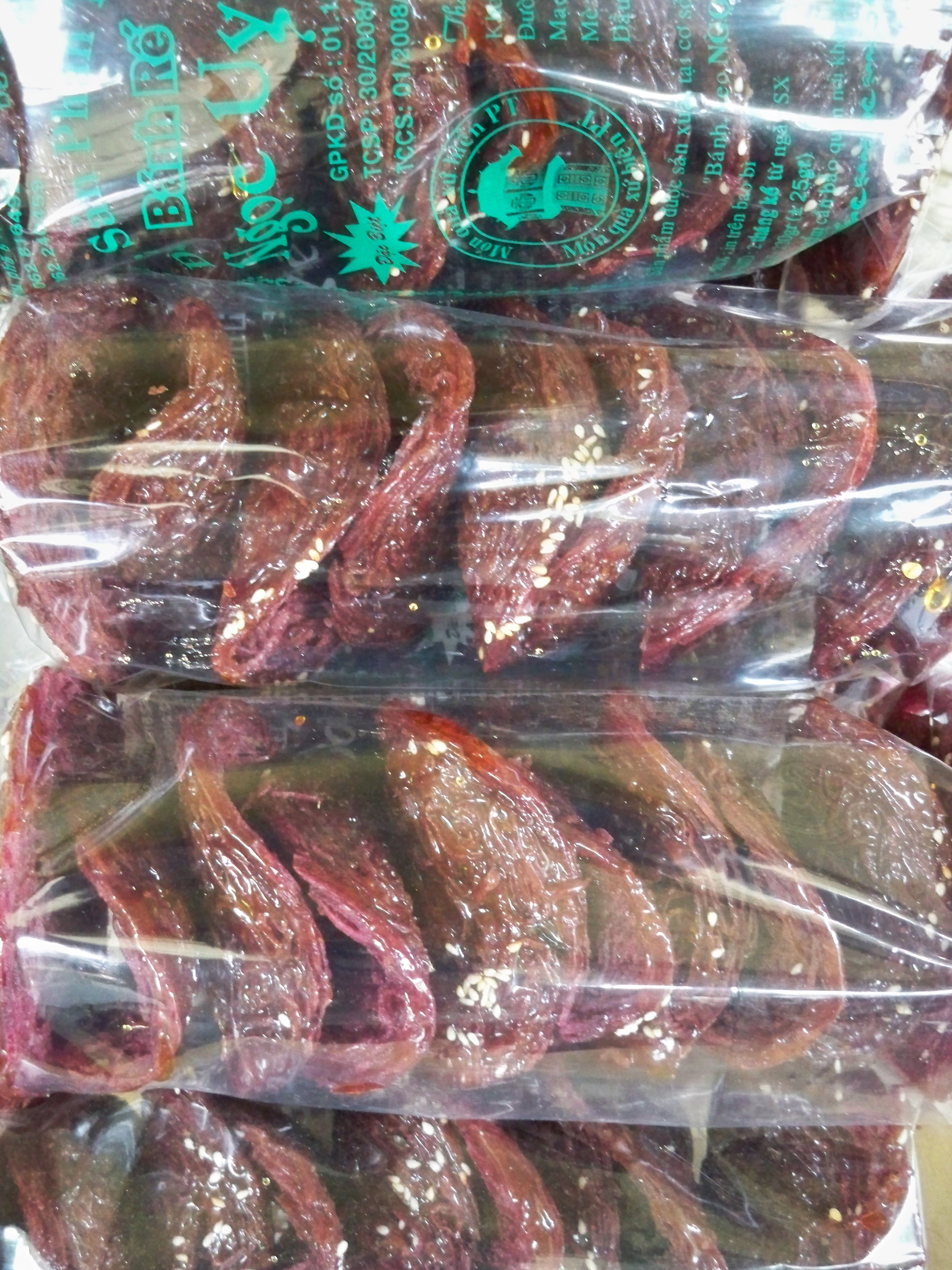
Bánh rế (red)

- Yellow: This variant is made of normal sweet potato and tapioca, with a golden color similar to that of honey.
- Red: This variant is made with Duong Ngoc sweet potatoes, giving it its reddish hue.
