= Bánh in =

Vietnamese cake

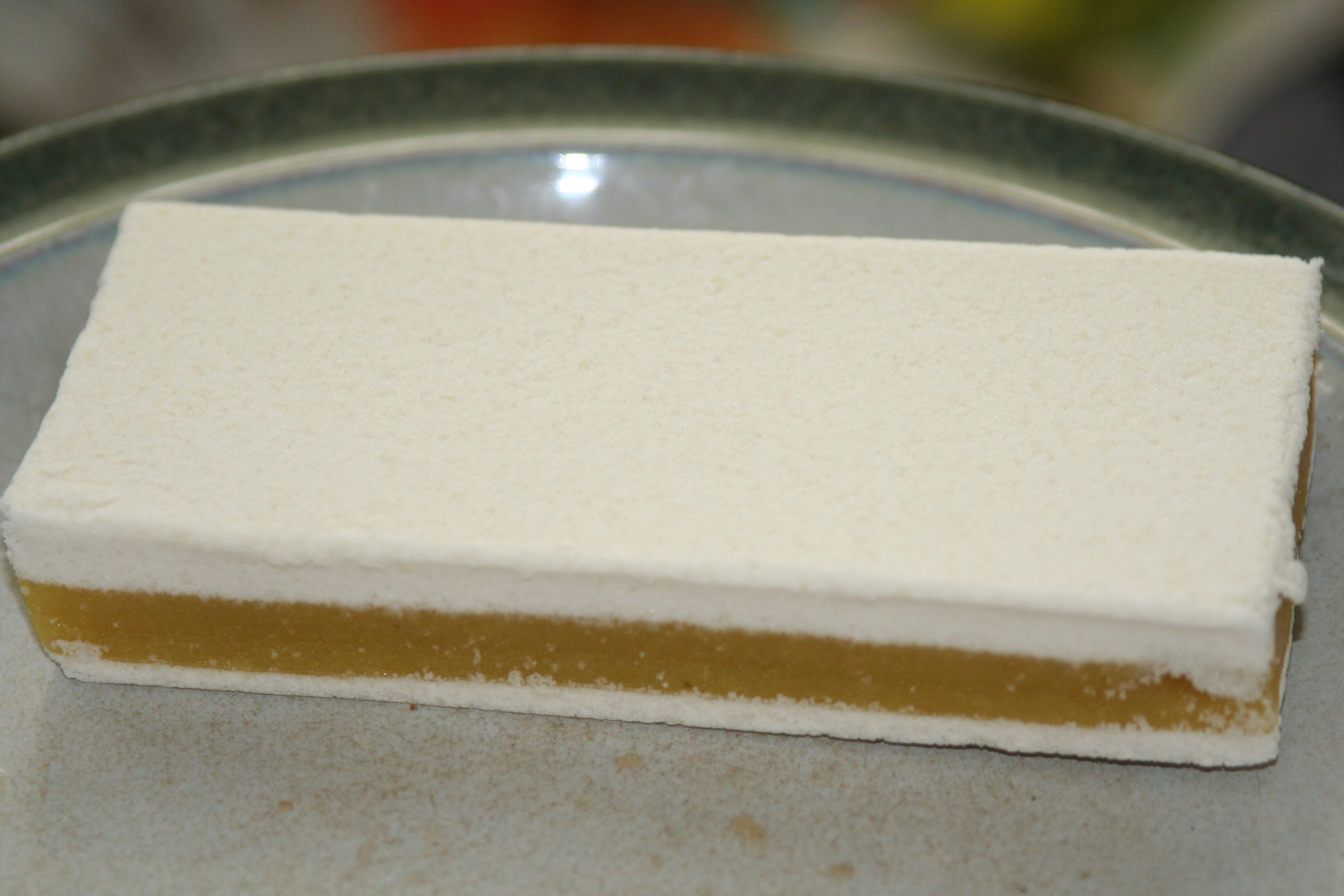
- Sweet rice flour with durian filling (bánh in nhân sầu riêng)
- Place of origin: Vietnam
- Region or state: Huế

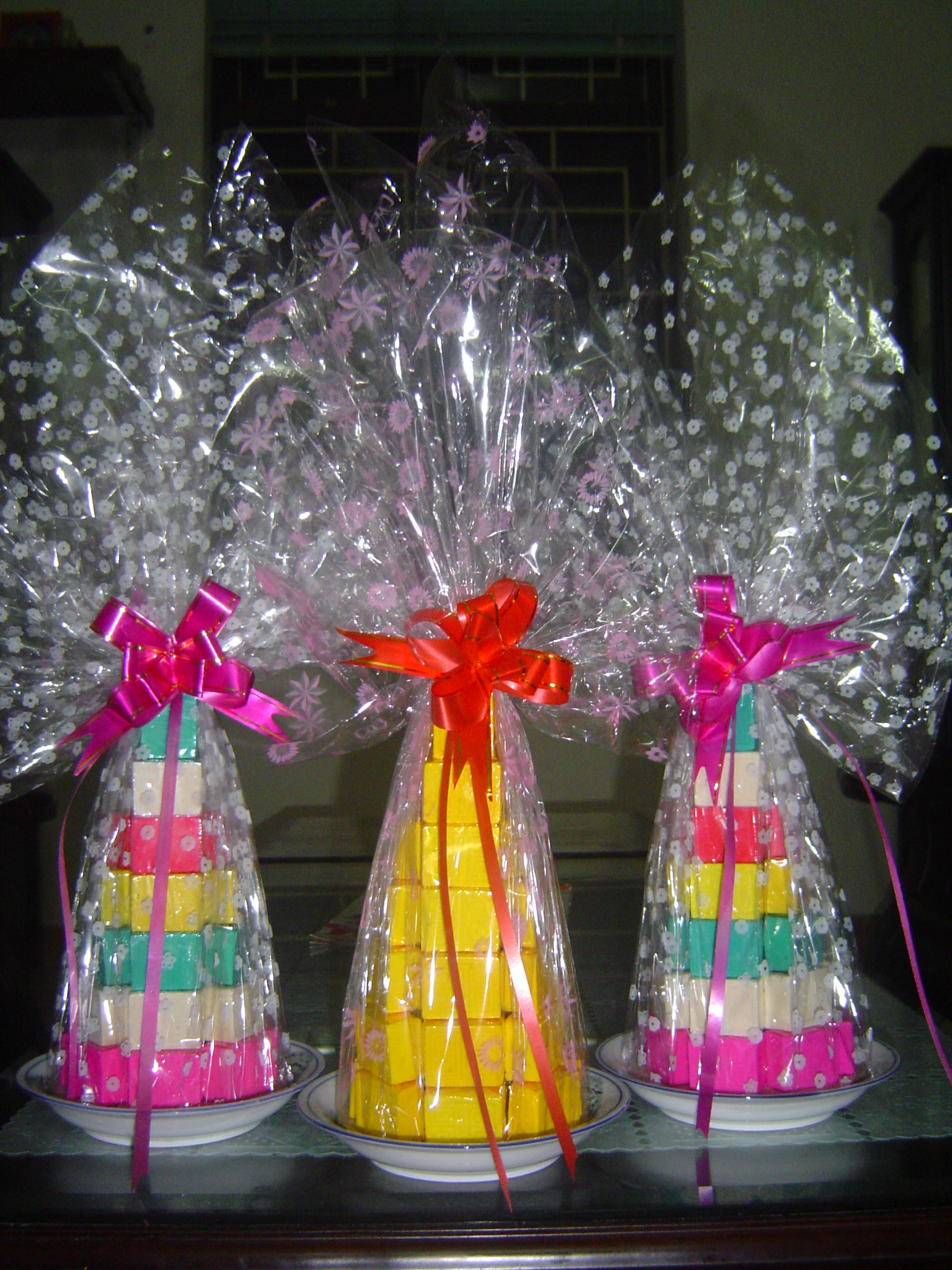
Packages of Bánh in

Bánh in (lit. 'seal cake') is a Vietnamese cake from the Huế area given at Tết, Lunar New Year. The cakes are often stamped with an auspicious character such as "thọ" (壽) for long life. The cake is now quite popular overseas as well and is commonly found all year round in Asian grocery shops worldwide, often in smaller rectangular shaped snack packs. The main ingredients are mung bean, rice flour and durian.
