= Chả =

Vietnamese types of sausage

Chả is Vietnamese for "sausage", referring to the Vietnamese types of sausage. Other types of sausage have different names: xúc xích refers to the pork-based Western "hot dog", and "lạp xưởng" refers to Chinese sausages, sweeter in flavour than the former two.

Chả can be made of several types of fillers:

- pork (chả lụa)
- deep-fried pork (chả chiên)
- deep-fried cinnamon-flavored pork sausage (chả quế)
- ground chicken (chả gà)
- ground beef (chả bò)
- fish (chả cá)
- tofu or vegetarian (chả chay)
- steamed pork loaf topped with egg yolks (chả trứng hấp)

== See also ==
- List of sausages
