= Bánh mật =

Vietnamese rice cake with bean paste filling

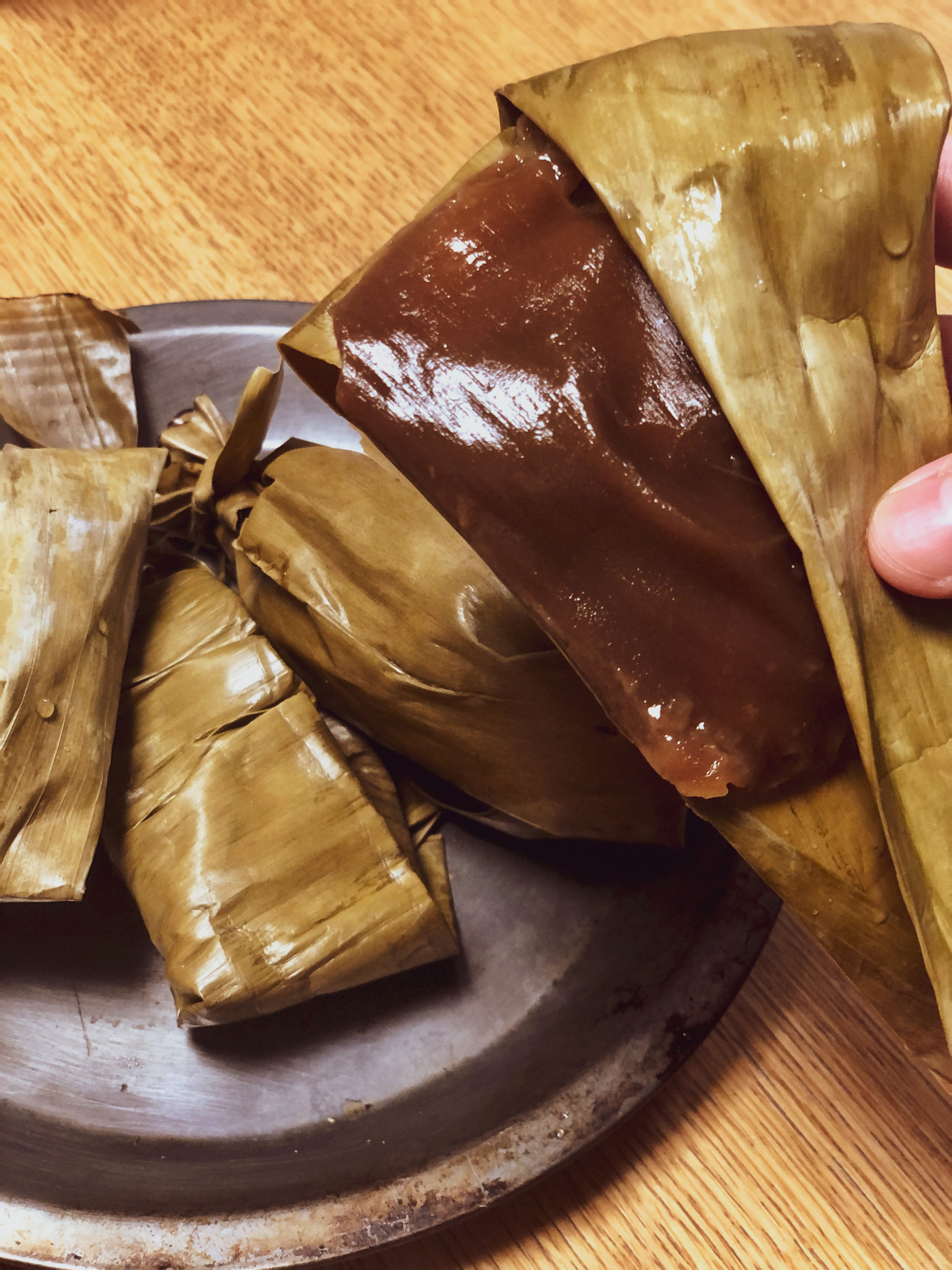
- Bánh mật wrapped in banana leaves
- Type: Rice cake
- Place of origin: Vietnam
- Region or state: Northern Vietnam
- Serving temperature: Warm or room temperature
- Main ingredients: Glutinous rice flour, molasses, peanuts, sesame seeds, banana leaves

Bánh mật is a Vietnamese dessert. It is made from molasses-sweetened glutinous rice cake, sometimes filled with green bean.

== See also ==
- Bánh mặt trăng moon-shaped cakes are eaten at the feast of Quân Am.
- List of desserts
