= Khao jee =

Laotian cooking method

Khao Jee
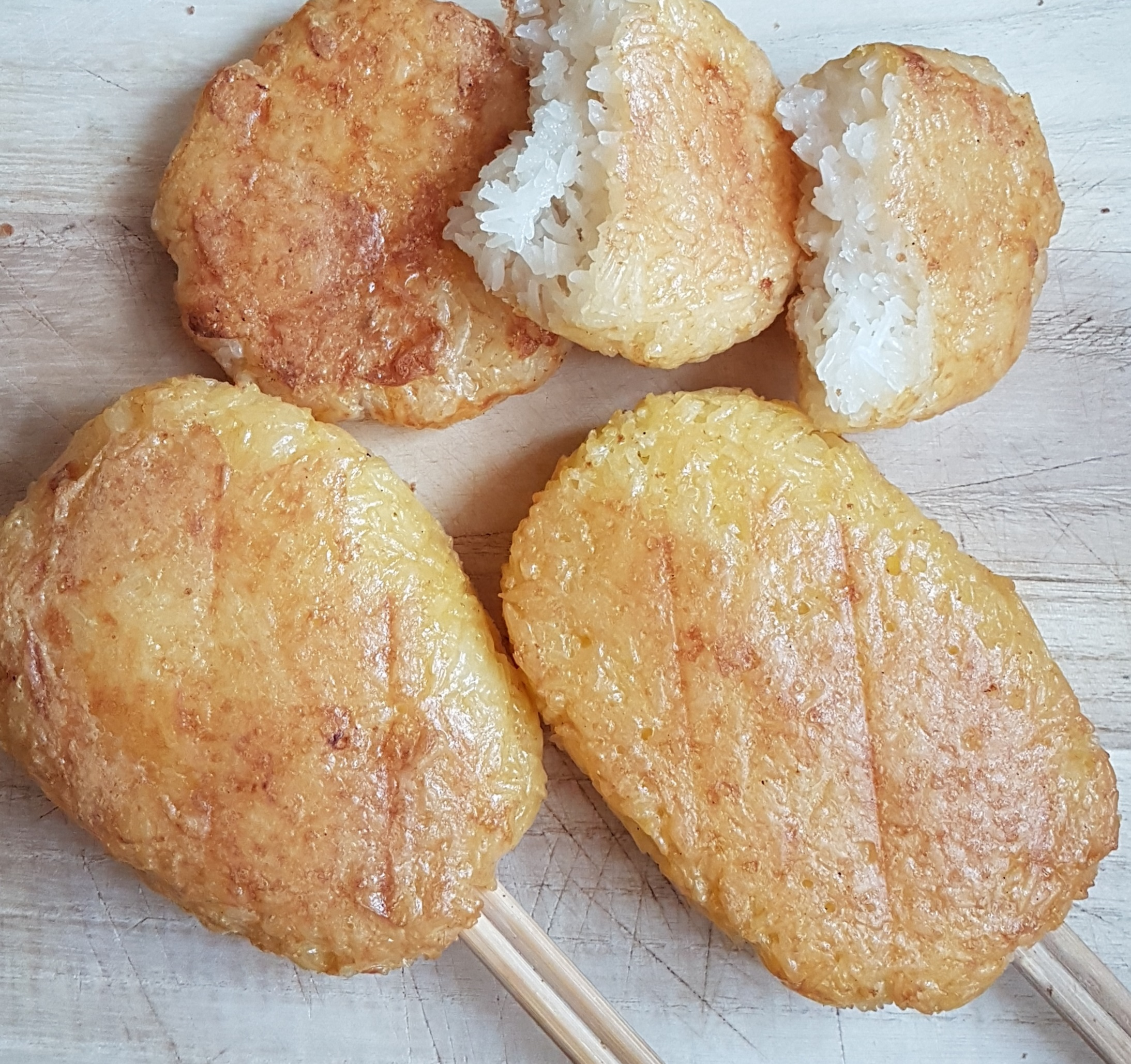
- Alternative names: Laotian sticky rice pancakes or Lao grilled sticky rice
- Place of origin: Laos
- Main ingredients: Sticky rice, egg, salt, fish sauce, padaek

Khao jee (Lao: ເຂົ້າຈີ່, pronounced [kʰȁ(ː)w.t͡ɕīː]), khao gee or jee khao (lit. 'grilled [sticky] rice' or 'grilling [sticky] rice'), also khao ping (Lao: ເຂົ້າປີ້ງ, [kʰȁ(ː)w.pîːŋ]), is an ancient Laotian cooking method of grilling glutinous rice or sticky rice on a stick over an open fire.

Khao jee or, more specifically, khao jee joom kai (lit. 'grilled sticky rice dipped in egg'), also known as Lao sticky rice pancakes with egg coating, is a traditional Lao food from Laos and the ethnic Lao of Isan or northeastern Thailand. Glutinous rice is the staple of the Lao people in Laos and in Thailand. In fact, the Lao consume more sticky rice than any other group of people in the world.

Since ancient time, khao jee is prepared for offering to monks during the Buddhist ceremony called boun khao jee (khao jee festival) held around February. Boun khao jee is among the twelve precepts that Lao people celebrate annually to commemorate The Buddha for his original teachings given to monks. The festival is marked by a morning ceremony to offer khao jee to monks and an evening grand parade of candle-bearing worshippers circling their local temples, making merit amid much religious music and chanting.

Today, Khao jee (joom kai) is usually served as a quick meal during breakfast or as a grab-and-go snack. Khao jee can be found at street stalls all over Laos. It was also named among the best street foods in Asia.

At the conclusion if the Vietnam War, between 1975 and 1995, it was estimated that approximately 200,000 Lao refugees, crossed the Mekong River into Thailand. Most stayed in the refugee camps while other moved to Bangkok looking for work.

During the economic boom of the 1980s and as demands for labour increased. It was estimated that between 1980 and 1990 approximately 1.1 million ethnic Lao from Isan had moved from the northeast to central Thailand and Bangkok. This, in turn, has helped popularize and create an unprecedented demand for Lao food outside of Laos and the northeast. Traditional Lao food such as sticky rice, papaya salad, larb, nam khao, kai yang, and khao jee etc., can now be found at street stalls and vendors in Bangkok and throughout Thailand.

The khao jee is made by forming the sticky rice into a patty or wrapped around a long stick acting as a vehicle or method of reaching the hot fire and flipping the sticky rice patties without burning one's hand, similar to toasting marshmallow over an open flame. The grilled sticky rice will form a crispy and nutty outer layer while centre are hot and chewy.

The most common and well-known way of eating Lao grilled sticky rice is with egg coating, but Laotians have been known to eat plain grilled sticky rice with a sprinkle of salt, or even coated in padaek, the traditional Lao fermented fish sauce.

In Laos, the term "khao jee" can also refer to a Lao-style French bread or baguette. One of the ever-lasting and fully embraced remnants of French colonial rules in Southeast Asia. The khao jee bread is commonly use in Vietnamese bánh mì sandwiches. The Lao variation of the sandwich is known as Khao Jee Pâté.
