= Roll'd Vietnamese =

Australian fast food chain

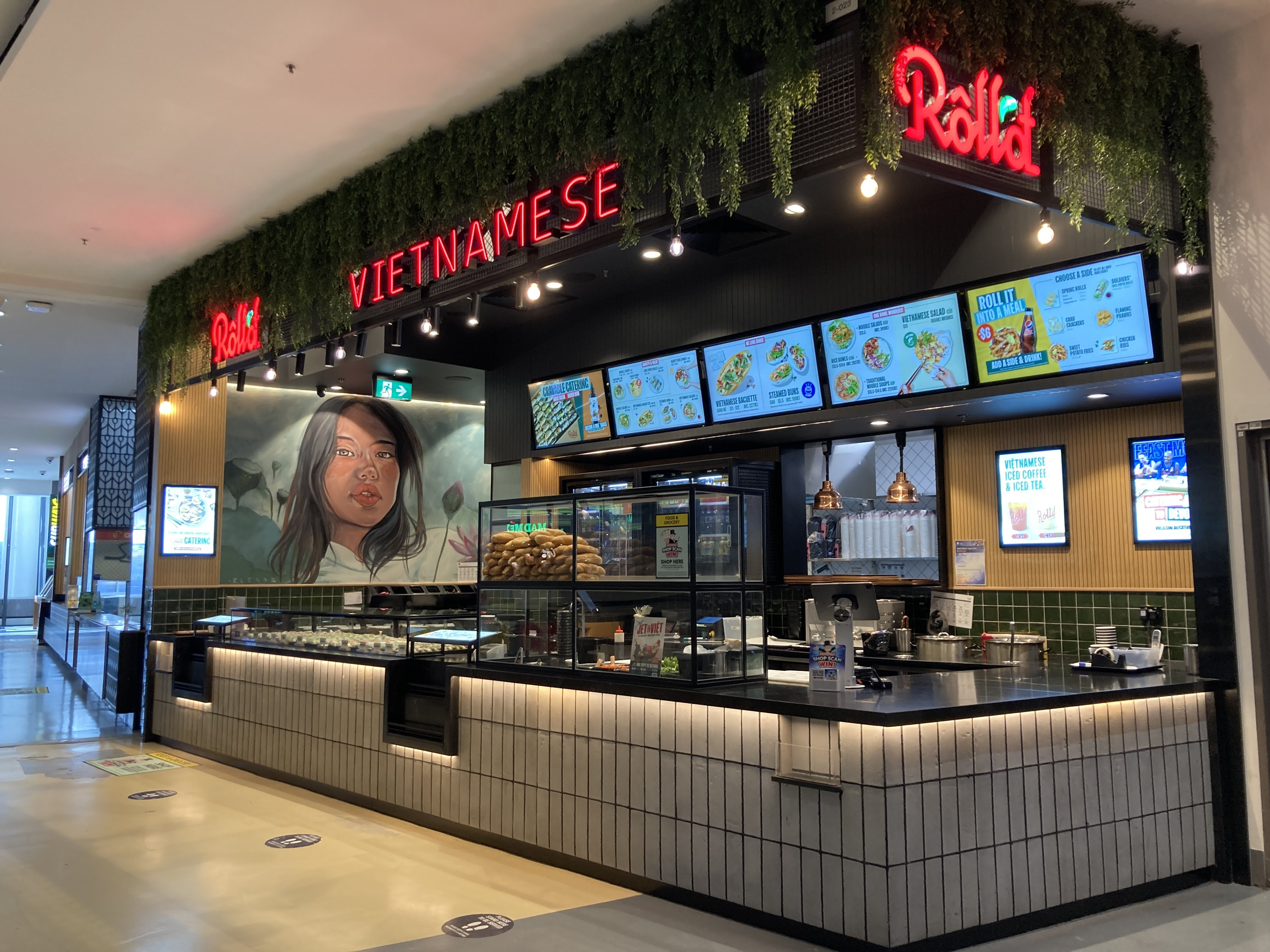
- A Roll'd location at DFO Homebush in Sydney
- Type: Franchise
- Industry: Restaurant
- Founded: 2012; 14 years ago
- Headquarters: Melbourne
- Number of locations: 125 +
- Products: Rice paper rolls, Pho, Vietnamese iced coffee
- Owner: Bao Hoang, Ray Esquires, and Tin Ly
- Website: www.rolld.com.au

Roll'd Vietnamese, or Roll'd, is an Australian-based fast food chain which specialises in a range of traditional Vietnamese cuisine dishes, including bánh mì, pho, and rice paper rolls, which are marketed as Soldiers. The first store was opened by founders Bao Hoang, Ray Esquires, and Tin Ly in Melbourne's CBD in 2012, quickly expanding to over 50 stores by 2016.

In 2021, Roll'd announced a partnership with supermarket chain Coles to bring ready-made grab & go meals and a range of other popular items to store shelves across Australia.

== See also ==
- List of restaurant chains in Australia
