= Num pang =

Cambodian bread or sandwich

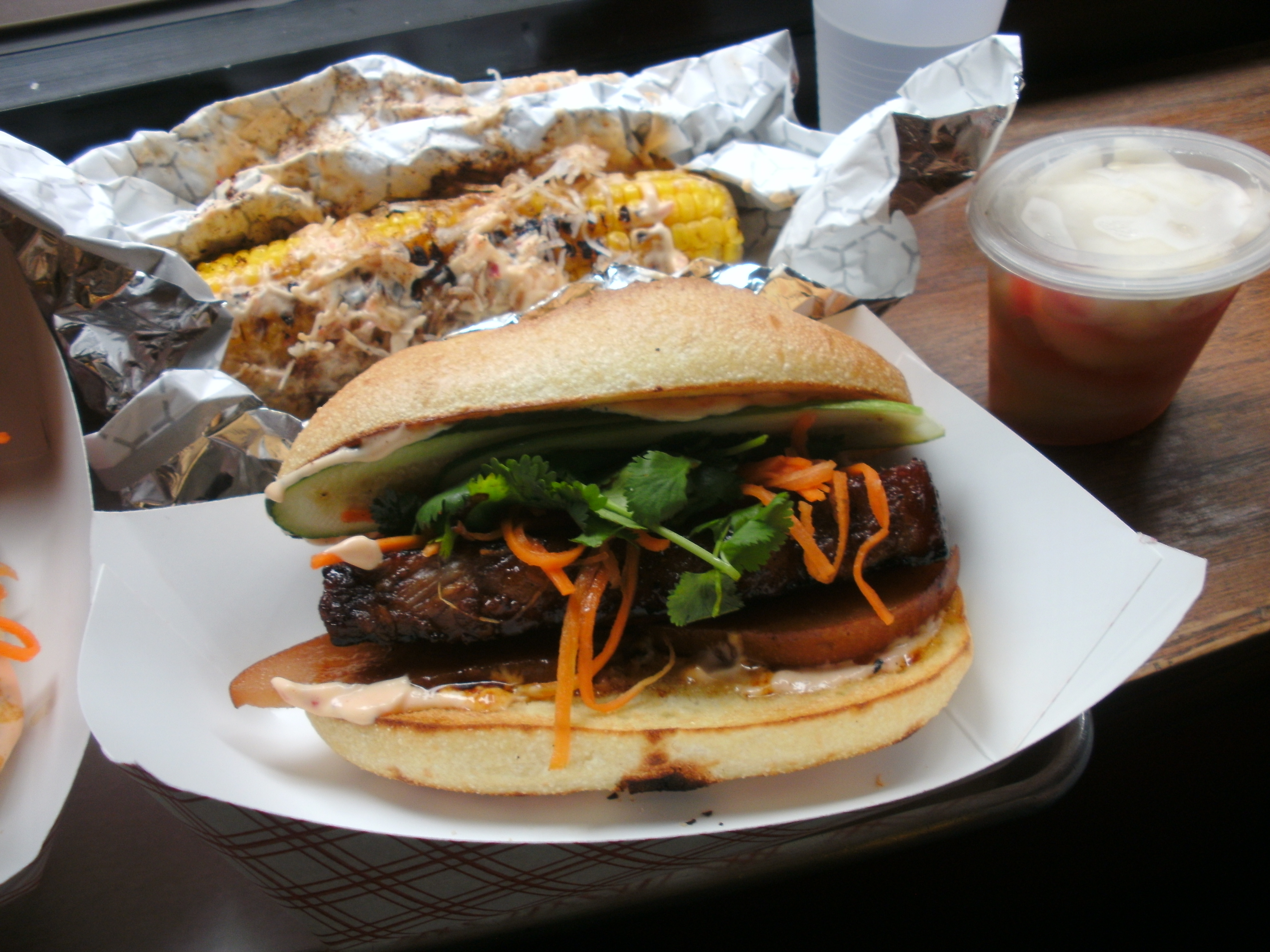
- Num pang with pork belly
- Alternative names: nom pang, nompang, nombang, Cambodian sandwich
- Type: Sandwich
- Place of origin: Cambodia
- Main ingredients: Baguette, mayonnaise, meat, vegetables, herbs
- Similar dishes: bánh mì, khao jee pâté

In Cambodian cuisine, num pang (Khmer: នំបុ័ង [num paŋ]; from French: pain – "bread") is a short baguette with thin, crisp crust and soft, airy texture. It is often split lengthwise and filled with savory ingredients like a submarine sandwich and served as a meal, called num pang sach (នំបុ័ងសាច់ [num paŋ sac]; lit. 'bread with meat'). It is similar to Laos's khao jee pâté and Vietnam's bánh mì.

== History ==
Baguettes were adopted into Cambodian cuisine from the French when Cambodia was a protectorate in French Indochina.

More recently, num pang has spread outside of Cambodia with eateries specializing in num pang opened in cities, such as New York, Washington, Boston, and Melbourne.

== Variations ==
There are a number of regional variations of num pang with different fillings:

- Num pang pâté (នំបុ័ងប៉ាតេ) with pâté, a variety of cold cuts, mayonnaise, pickled carrots and daikon, cucumbers and fresh herbs (such as coriander).
- Num pang brahet (នំបុ័ងប្រហិត) with pork meatballs, mayonnaise, pickled carrots and daikon, salad, and fresh herbs (such as coriander, mint and basil). A very popular street food snack in Siem Reap.
- Num pang sach chruk (នំបុ័ងសាច់ជ្រូក) with braised pork belly, mayonnaise, pickled carrots and papaya, and fresh herbs (such as coriander).
- Num pang sach ko (នំបុ័ងសាច់គោ) with grilled lemongrass beef skewers, mayonnaise, pickled carrots and papaya, cucumber and fresh herbs.
- Num pang trey khaw (នំបុ័ងខត្រី) with fish simmered in tomato sauce, mayonnaise, pickled carrots and papaya, cucumber, and fresh herbs (such as coriander).
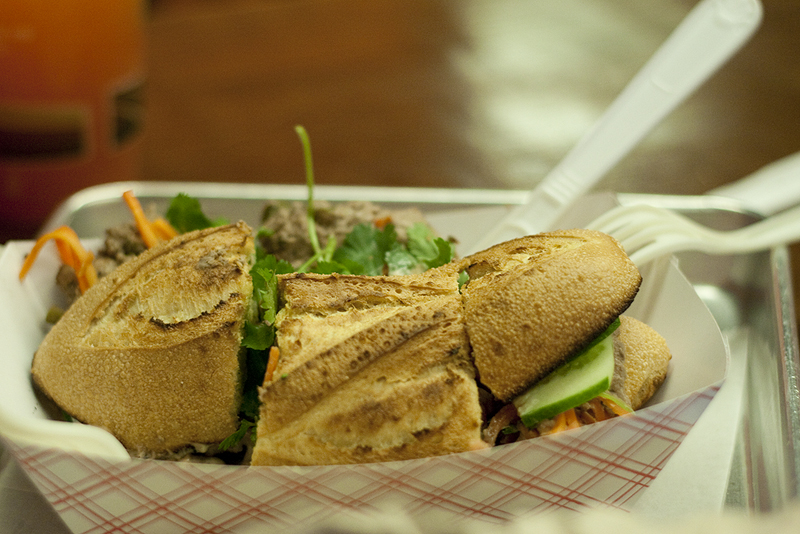
Num pang with liver pâté

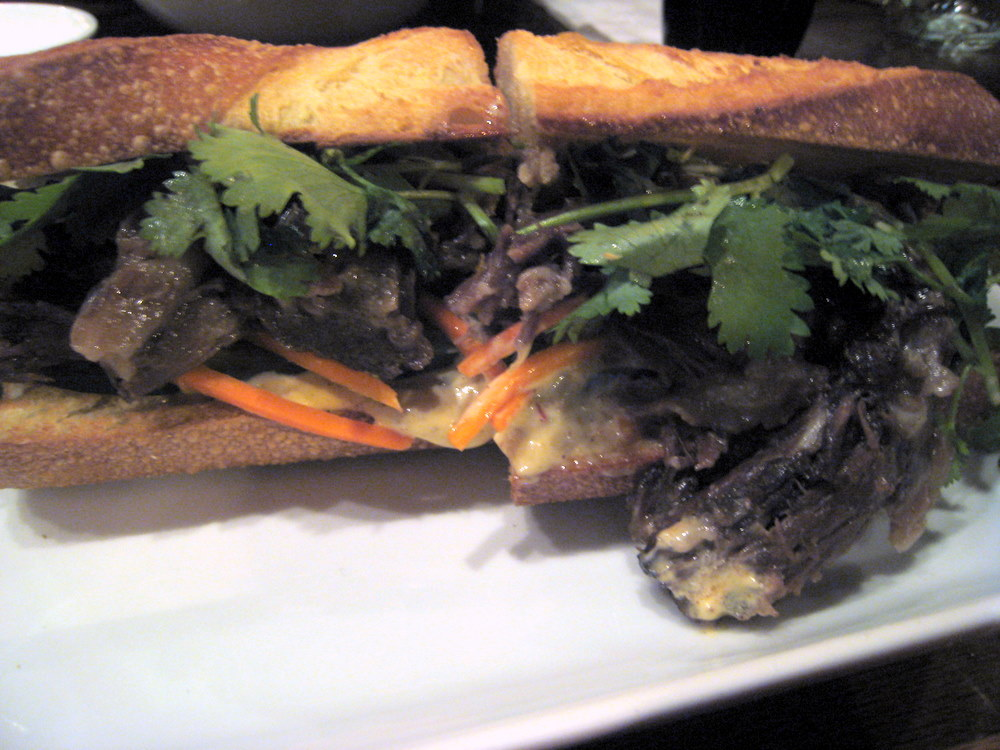
Num pang with oxtail

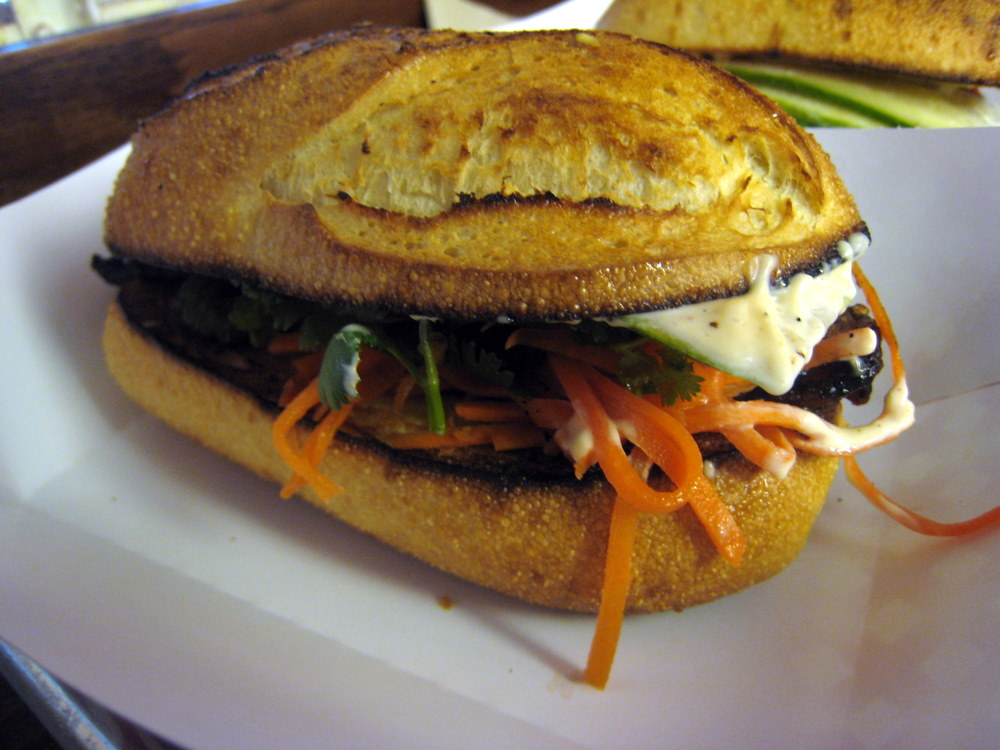
Num pang with catfish
