= Dong Phuong Oriental Bakery =

Vietnamese bakery and restaurant in New Orleans, Louisiana, United States

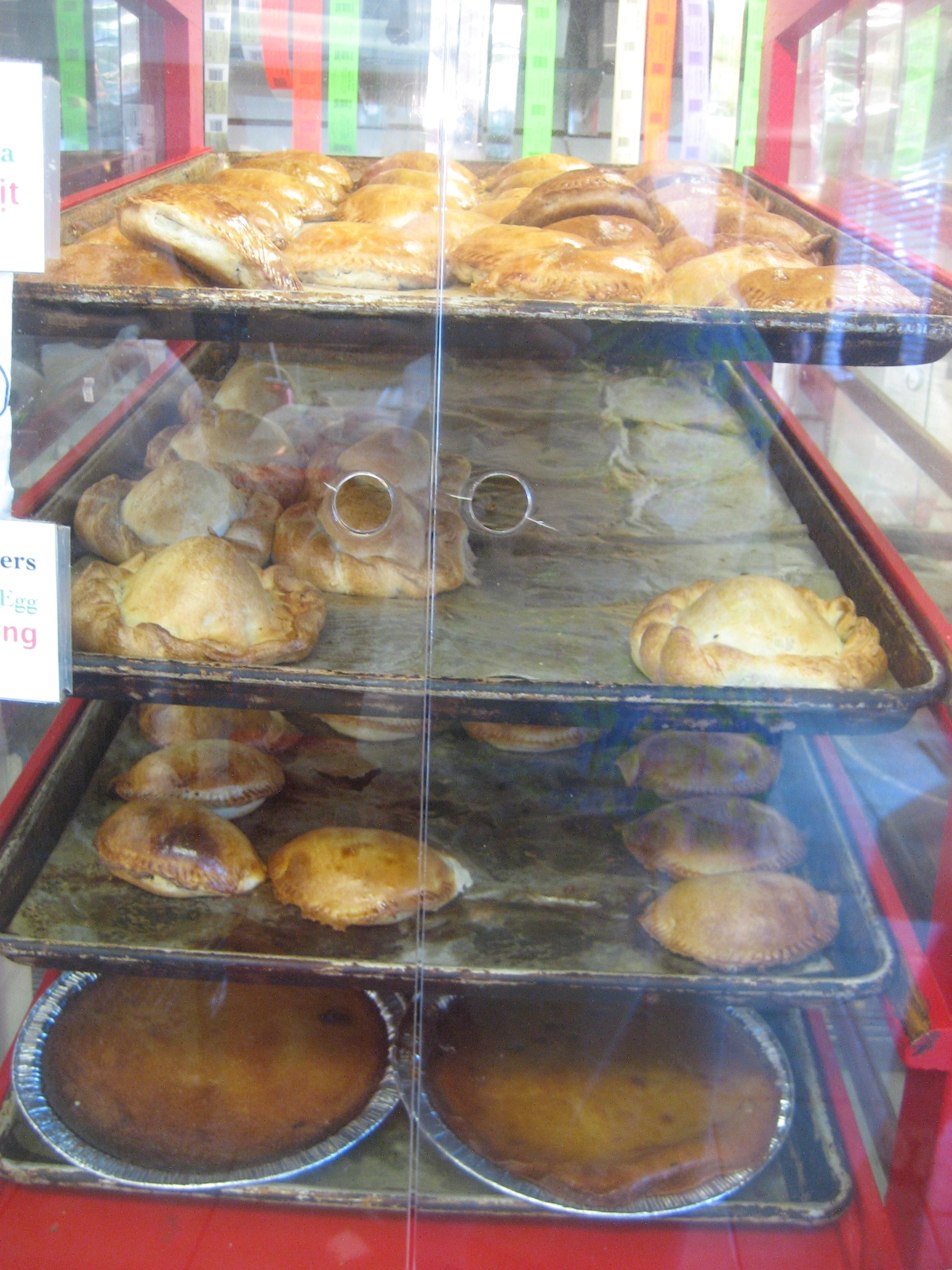
- Vietnamese meat pies
- Interactive map of Dong Phuong Oriental Bakery

Restaurant information
- Established: 1981
- Owners: De Tran; Huong Tran
- Head chef: De Tran; Huong Tran
- Food type: Bakery
- Rating: 4.6 stars
- Location: 14207 Chef Menteur Highway, Suite 1A, New Orleans, Orleans Parish, Louisiana, 70129, U.S.
- Coordinates: 30.0359°N 89.9150°W
- Website: dpbakery.com

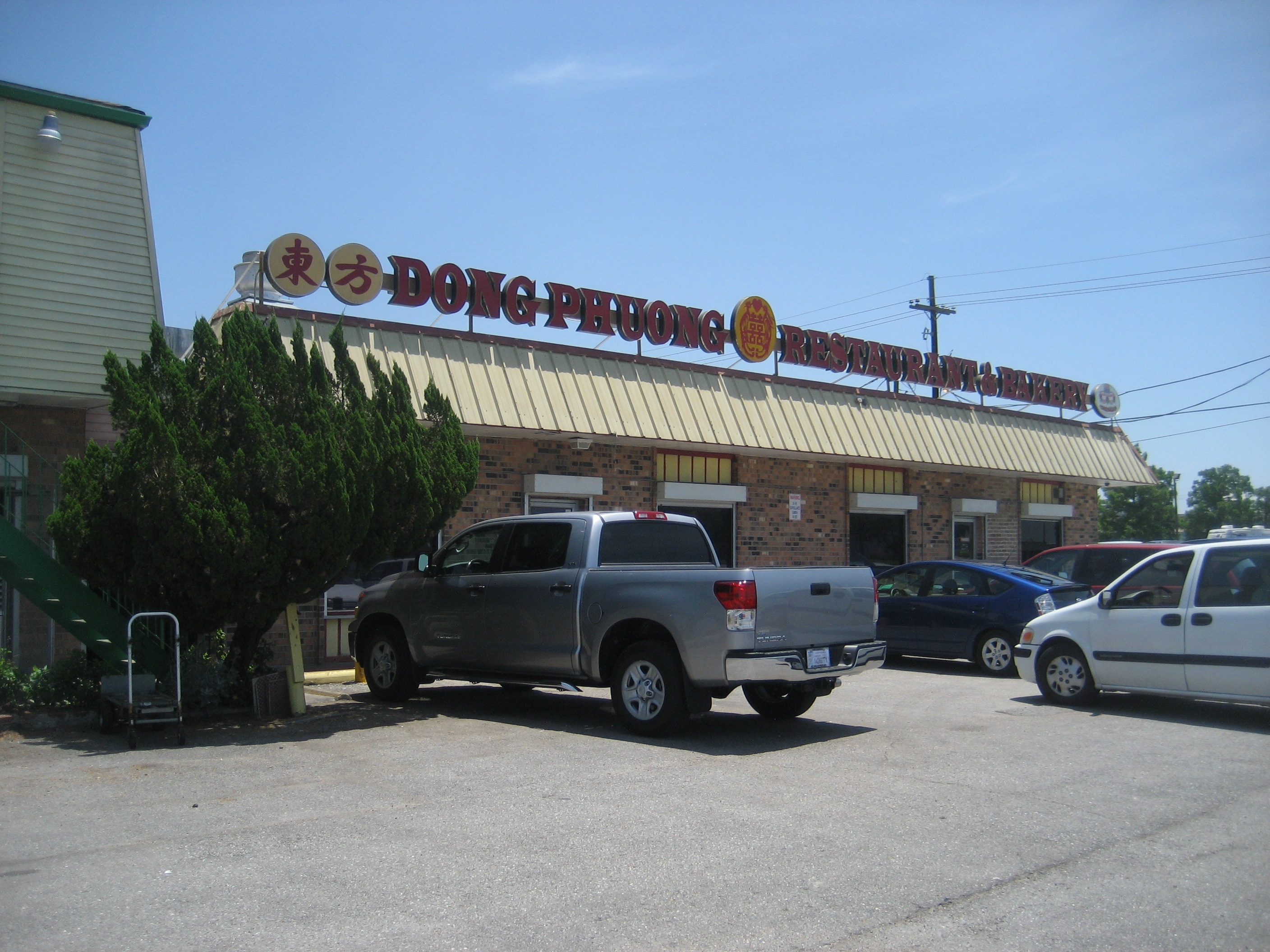
Dong Phuong exterior

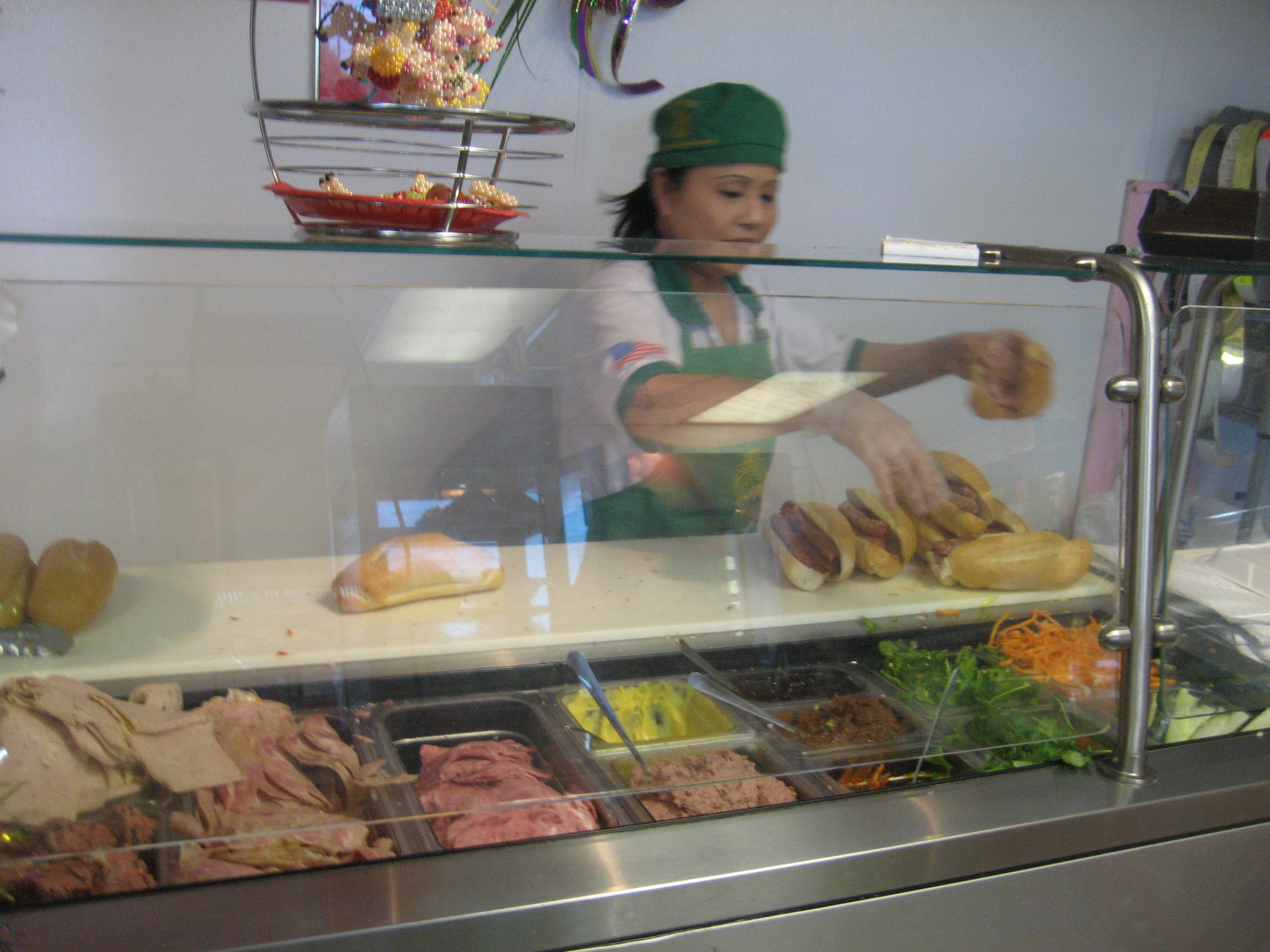
Banh mi counter

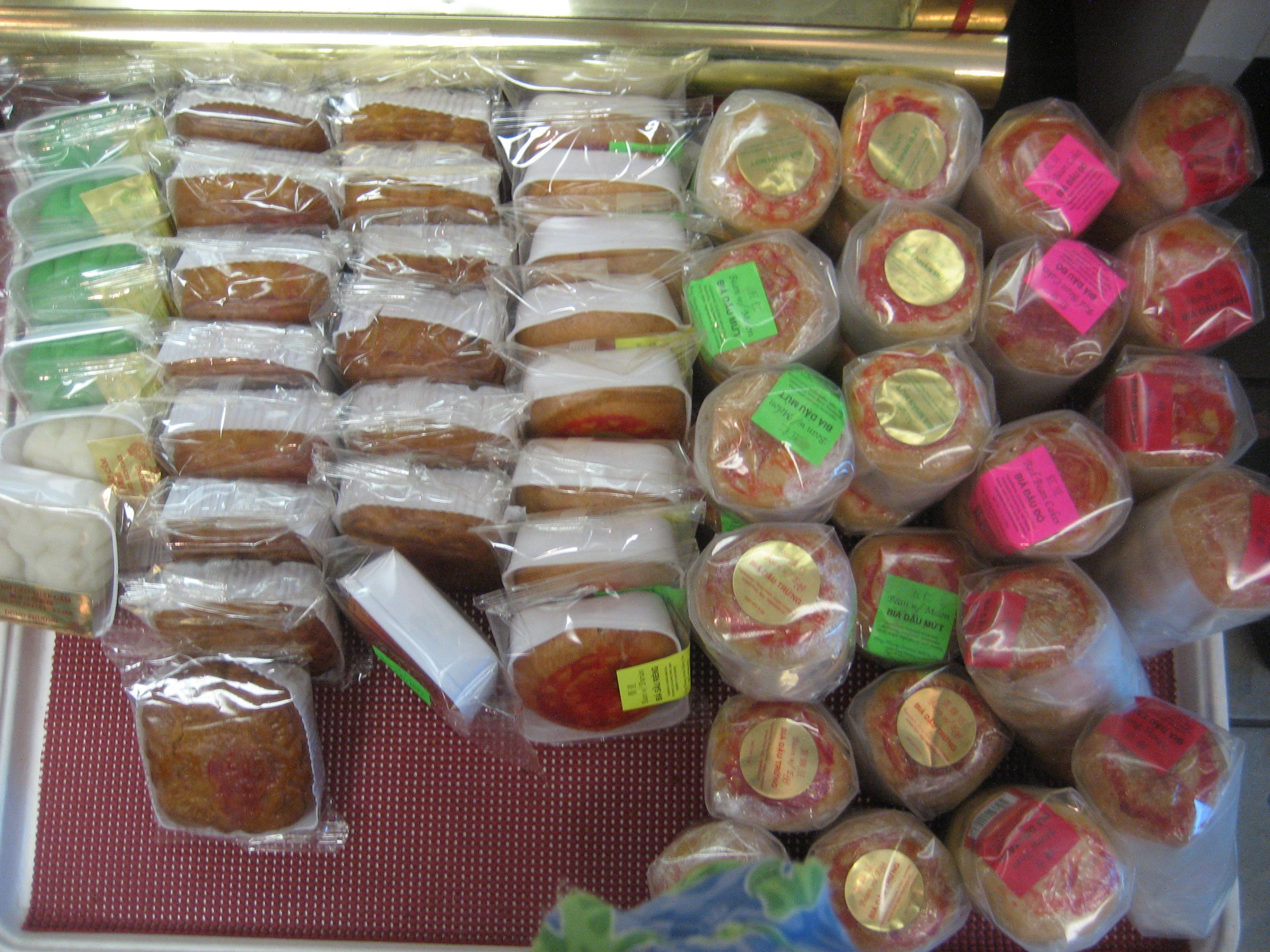
Vietnamese sweet buns

Dong Phuong Oriental Bakery (Vietnamese: Đông Phương, literally "The Orient") is a Vietnamese retail and wholesale bakery, restaurant, and catering business in New Orleans, Louisiana. It is known for supplying the baguette style bread for many of the city's restaurants that offer bánh mì or other sandwiches, and has its own popular bánh mì counter. The bakery, along with the nearby Mary Queen of Vietnam Catholic Church, were fixtures of the Vietnamese community in New Orleans even before surviving the devastation of Hurricane Katrina. It is located at 14207 Chef Menteur Highway in the "Little Vietnam" section of Eastern New Orleans. It is attached to a sit-down restaurant of the same name that serves a variety of Vietnamese and Chinese dishes, including phở, bún thịt nướng, bún riêu, and bánh hỏi.

== History ==
De and Huong Tran, Vietnamese immigrants to the United States, opened Dong Phuong in 1981. Huong learned to bake pastries in her father's bakery in Vietnam and De joined in the effort to recreate his favorite childhood foods.

In 2018, Dong Phuong was recognized by the James Beard Foundation as America's Classic. In the past, the James Beard Foundation has honored Mosca's, Willie Mae's Scotch House and Hansen's Sno-Bliz with the America's Classic award in New Orleans.

== Culinary role in community ==
The bakery's bánh mì sandwiches are often referred to as Vietnamese po-boys. Guidebook author Sara Roahen refers to the bakery as the Vietnamese Leidenheimer's, because Dong Phuong supplies bread for the area's bánh mì makers. The bread is also used at the Borgne and Tamarind restaurants, whose unusual bánh mì offerings include cured lamb belly, slow braised pork, and sautéed shrimp marinated with crushed garlic and kaffir lime leaf.

Along with fellow Vietnamese cuisine restaurants such as Phở Tàu Bay, Tân Định, Kim Sơn, and Nine Roses, Dong Phuong has helped develop a loyal following in New Orleans for Vietnamese staples that includes organized fan clubs. The eateries are said to have succeeded in "weaving the cuisine into the larger Crescent City culture", including among those with no direct connection to Vietnam.

A New York Times Magazine article cast Dong Phuong among the best bánh mì makers in the U.S. and one of the most unusual in the area east of downtown New Orleans on Chef Menteur Highway. A 2010 New York Times article noted that most bánh mì in New Orleans are made with bread from Dong Phuong and referred to the experience of having a bánh mì at Dong Phuong as "one of the signal pleasures of the American South." Some 16 varieties of the sandwich are offered.

The Dong Phuong restaurant is a favorite of writer Poppy Z. Brite, and it is mentioned in his novel "Lost Souls".

== Offerings ==
Dong Phuong offers a variety of baked goods, including a large assortment of bánh, at its retail bakery. A counter offers sandwiches to go. The business also includes a full-service restaurant in adjacent space in the same building. Dong Phuong caters, and ships wholesale in the U.S.

== See also ==
- List of Vietnamese restaurants
