= Bánh mì =

Vietnamese bread or sandwich

Bánh mì or bánh mỳ
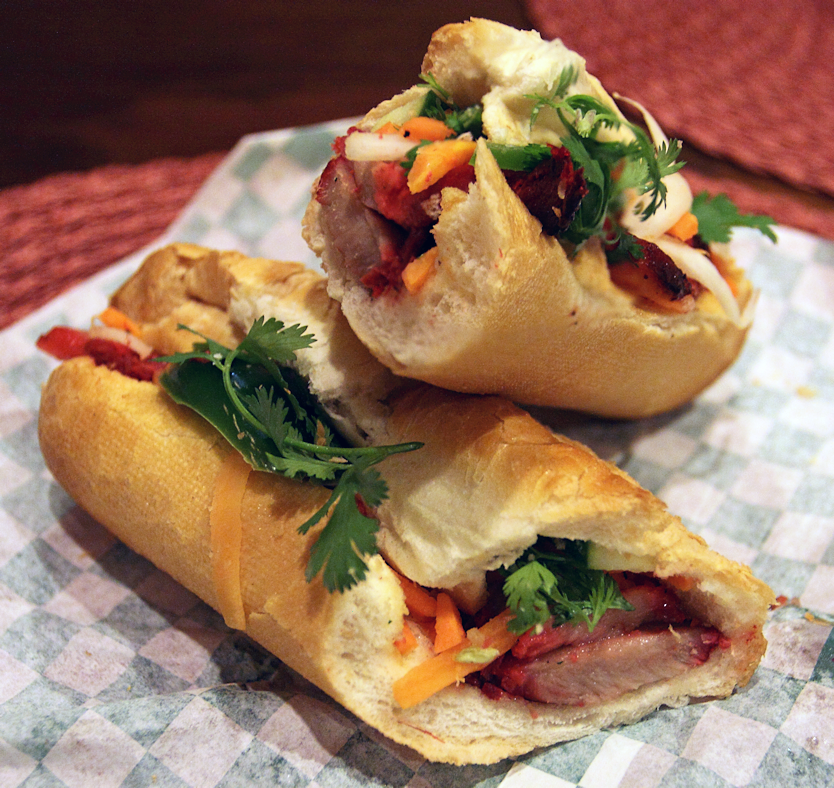
- Alternative names: Vietnamese roll or sandwich, Saigon roll or sandwich
- Type: Sandwich
- Place of origin: Vietnam
- Region or state: Southern Vietnam
- Invented: 1950s
- Main ingredients: Vietnamese baguette (also called bánh mì)
- Variations: See below
- Similar dishes: num pang, khao jee pâté

Bánh mì (Note: Alternatively transliterated as Bánh mỳ(/ˈbɑːn miː/ /ˈbæn/;) (Vietnamese: [ɓǎjŋ̟ mì] (Note: Hanoi: [ɓaʲŋ̟˧˥.mi˧˩]; Saigon: [ɓan˧˥.mi˧˩])) is a Vietnamese staple food. It is a short baguette with thin, crisp crust and a soft, airy texture, usually made with mixed rice flour and wheat flour. Similar to a submarine sandwich, it is often split lengthwise, filled with meat and savory ingredients and served as a meal, called bánh mì thịt, but can also be eaten plain.

A typical Vietnamese roll or sandwich is a fusion of proteins and vegetables from native Vietnamese cuisine such as chả lụa (Vietnamese sausage), coriander (cilantro), cucumber, pickled carrots, and pickled daikon combined with condiments from French cuisine such as pâté, along with red chili and mayonnaise. However, a variety of popular fillings are used, like xá xíu (Chinese barbecued pork), xíu mại (Vietnamese minced pork), nem nướng (grilled pork sausage), đậu hũ (tofu), and even ice cream, which is more of a dessert. In Vietnam, bread rolls and sandwiches are typically eaten for breakfast or as a snack.

The baguette was introduced to Vietnam by the French colonial administration in the mid-19th century, and became a staple food by the early 20th century. In the 1950s, a distinctly Vietnamese style of sandwich developed in Saigon, becoming a popular street food, also known as bánh mì Sài Gòn ('Saigon sandwich' or 'Saigon-style bánh mì'). Following the Vietnam War, overseas Vietnamese popularized the bánh mì sandwich in countries such as Australia, Canada and the United States. In these countries, they are commonly sold in Asian bakeries.

== Terminology ==
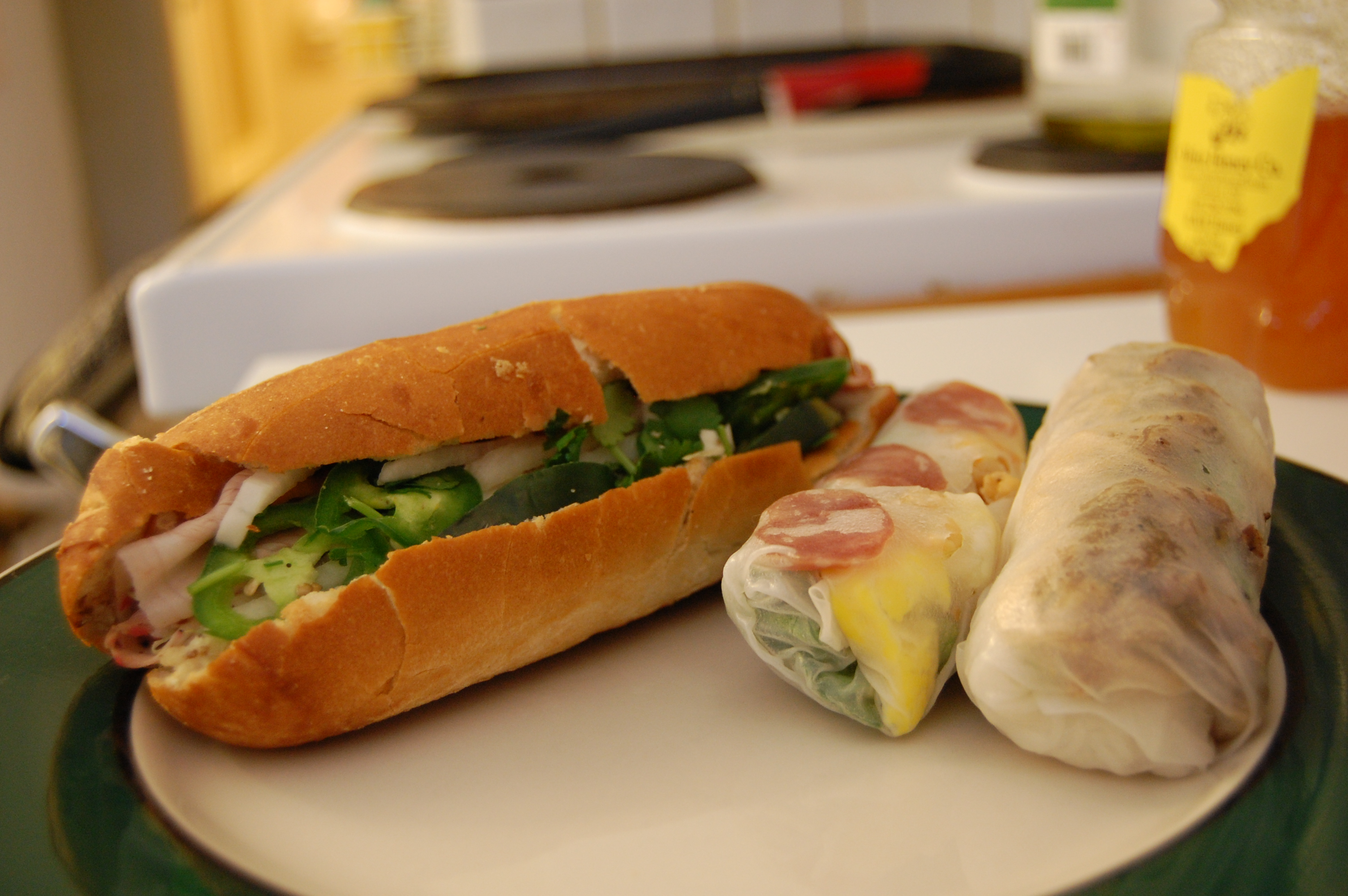
Bánh mì and bì cuốn

In Vietnamese, the word bánh mì is derived from bánh (which can refer to many kinds of food, primarily baked goods, including bread) and mì ("wheat"). It may also be spelled bánh mỳ in northern Vietnam. Taken alone, bánh mì means any kind of bread, but it could refer to the Vietnamese baguette or the sandwich made from it. To distinguish the unfilled bread from the sandwich with fillings, the term bánh mì không ("plain bread") can be used. To distinguish Vietnamese-style bread from other kinds of bread, the term bánh mì Sài Gòn ("Saigon-style bread") or bánh mì Việt Nam ("Vietnam-style bread") can be used.

A false etymology claims that the word bánh mì is a corruption of the French pain de mie, meaning soft, white bread. However, bánh (or its Nôm form, 餅) has referred to rice cakes and other pastries since as early as the 13th century, long before French contact.

== History ==
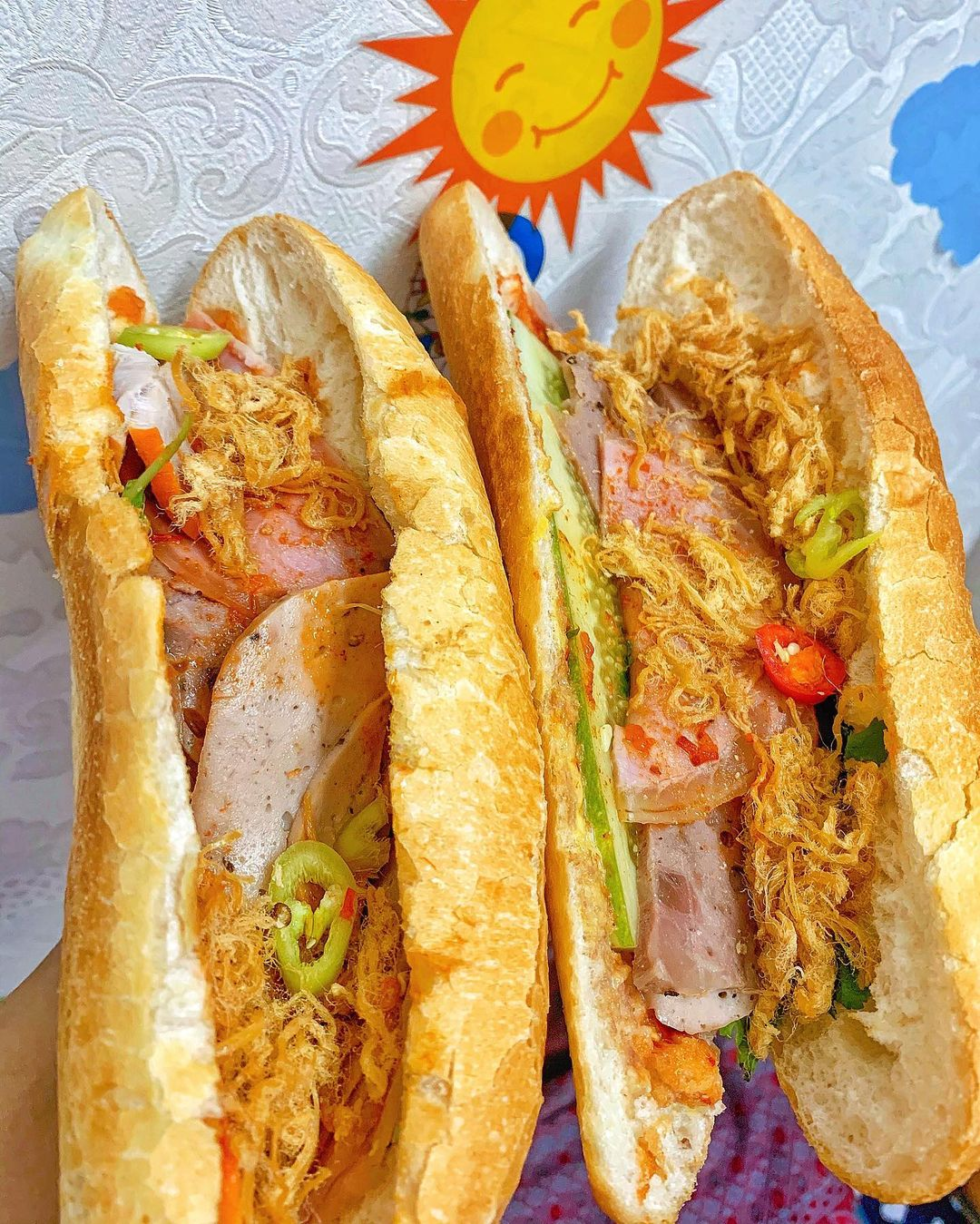
Bánh mì chà bông, giò lụa, chili pepper

The word bánh mì, meaning "bread", is attested in Vietnamese as early as the 1830s, in Jean-Louis Taberd's dictionary Dictionarium Latino-Annamiticum. The French introduced Vietnam to the baguette, along with other baked goods such as pâté chaud, in the 1860s, at the start of their imperialism in Vietnam. Many sources characterize bánh mì primarily as a French bread tradition adapted in Vietnam, with local fillings added atop the colonial-era baguette base. Vietnamese vendors layered herbs, pickles, chiles, and meats onto this foundation, producing a distinctive Saigon street-food form by the mid-20th century.

Northern Vietnamese initially called the baguette bánh tây, literally "Western bánh", while Southern Vietnamese called it bánh mì, "wheat bánh". Nguyễn Đình Chiểu mentions the baguette in his 1861 poem "Văn tế nghĩa sĩ Cần Giuộc". Due to the price of imported wheat at the time, French baguettes and sandwiches were considered a luxury. During World War I, an influx of French soldiers and supplies arrived. At the same time, disruptions of wheat imports led bakers to begin mixing in inexpensive rice flour (which also made the bread fluffier). As a result, it became possible for ordinary Vietnamese to enjoy French staples such as bread. Many shops baked twice a day, because bread tends to go stale quickly in the hot, humid climate of Vietnam. Baguettes were mainly eaten for breakfast with some butter and sugar.

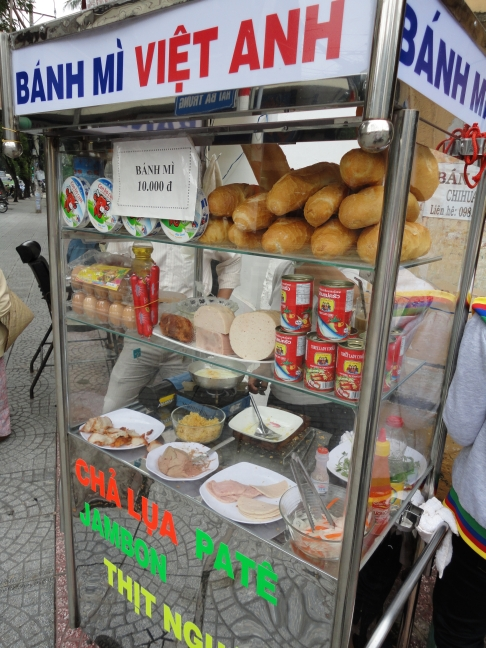
A bánh mì stand in Ho Chi Minh City

Until the 1950s, sandwiches hewed closely to French tastes, typically a jambon-beurre moistened with a mayonnaise or liver pâté spread. The 1954 Partition of Vietnam sent over a million migrants from North Vietnam to South Vietnam, transforming Saigon's local cuisine. Among the migrants were Lê Minh Ngọc and Nguyễn Thị Tịnh, who opened a small bakery named Hòa Mã in District 3. In 1958, Hòa Mã became one of the first shops to sell bánh mì thịt. Around this time, another migrant from the North began selling chả sandwiches from a basket on a mobylette, and a stand in Gia Định Province (present-day Phú Nhuận District) began selling phá lấu sandwiches. Some shops stuffed sandwiches with inexpensive Cheddar cheese, which came from French food aid that migrants from the North had rejected. Vietnamese communities in France also began selling bánh mì.

After the Fall of Saigon in 1975, bánh mì sandwiches became a luxury item once again. During the so-called "subsidy period", state-owned phở eateries often served bread or cold rice as a side dish, leading to the present-day practice of dipping quẩy in phở. In the 1980s, Đổi Mới market reforms led to a renaissance in bánh mì, mostly as street food.

Meanwhile, Vietnamese Americans brought bánh mì sandwiches to cities across the United States. In Northern California, Lê Văn Bá and his sons are credited with popularizing bánh mì among Vietnamese and non-Vietnamese Americans alike through their food truck services provider and their fast-food chain, Lee's Sandwiches, beginning in the 1980s. Sometimes bánh mì was likened to local sandwiches. In New Orleans, a "Vietnamese po' boy" recipe won the 2009 award for the best po' boy at the annual Oak Street Po-Boy Festival. A restaurant in Philadelphia also sells a similar sandwich, marketed as a "Vietnamese hoagie".

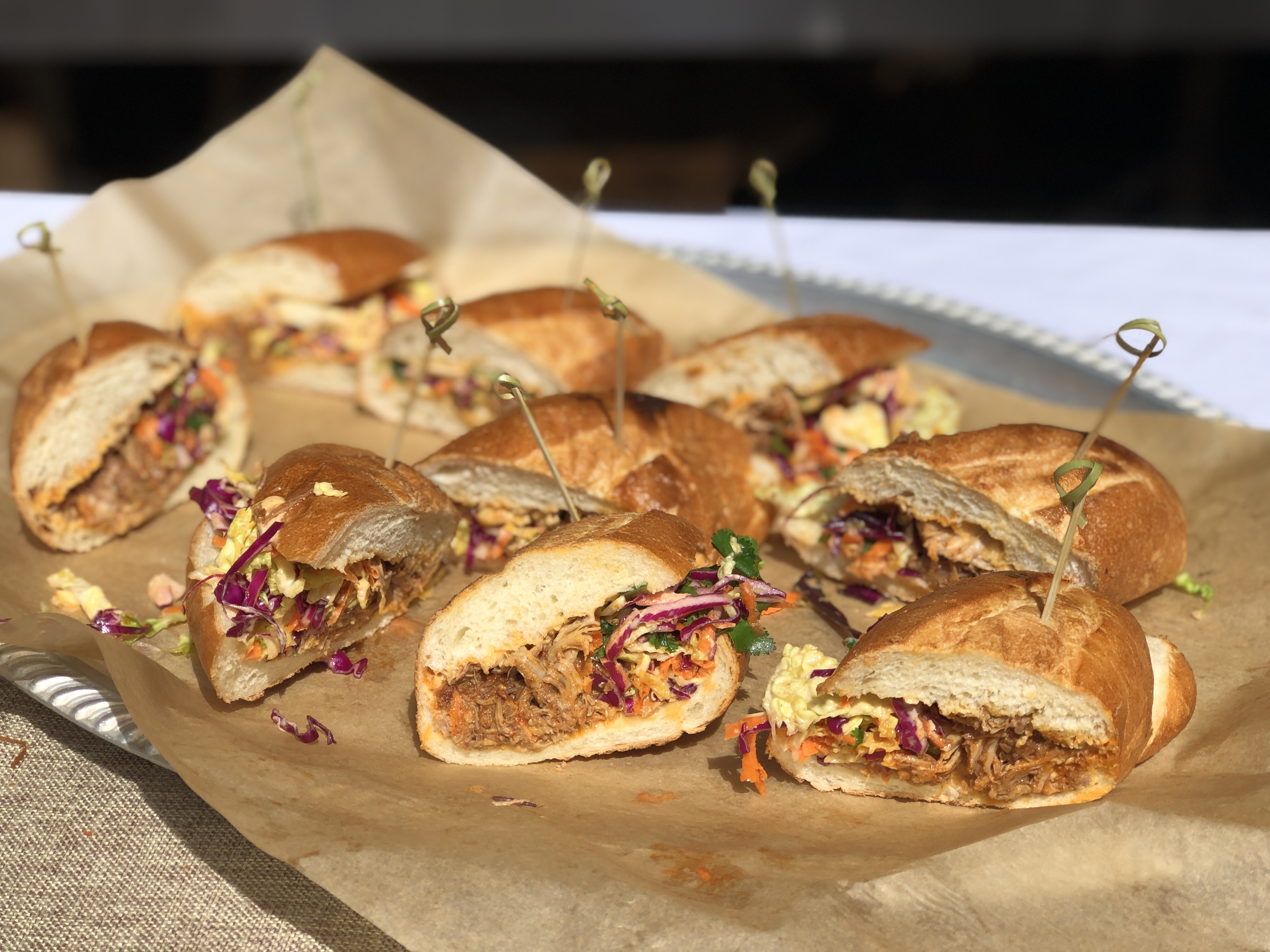
Bánh mì in California

Since the 1970s, Vietnamese refugees from the Vietnam War arrived in London and were hosted at community centers in areas of London such as De Beauvoir Town eventually founding a string of successful Vietnamese-style canteens in Shoreditch where bánh mì alongside phở, was popularised from the 1990s.

Bánh mì sandwiches were featured in the 2002 PBS documentary Sandwiches That You Will Like. The word bánh mì was added to the Oxford English Dictionary on 24 March 2011. As of 2017, bánh mì is included in about 2% of U.S. restaurant sandwich menus, a nearly fivefold increase from 2013. On 24 March 2020, Google celebrated bánh mì with a Google Doodle.

== Ingredients ==
=== Bread ===
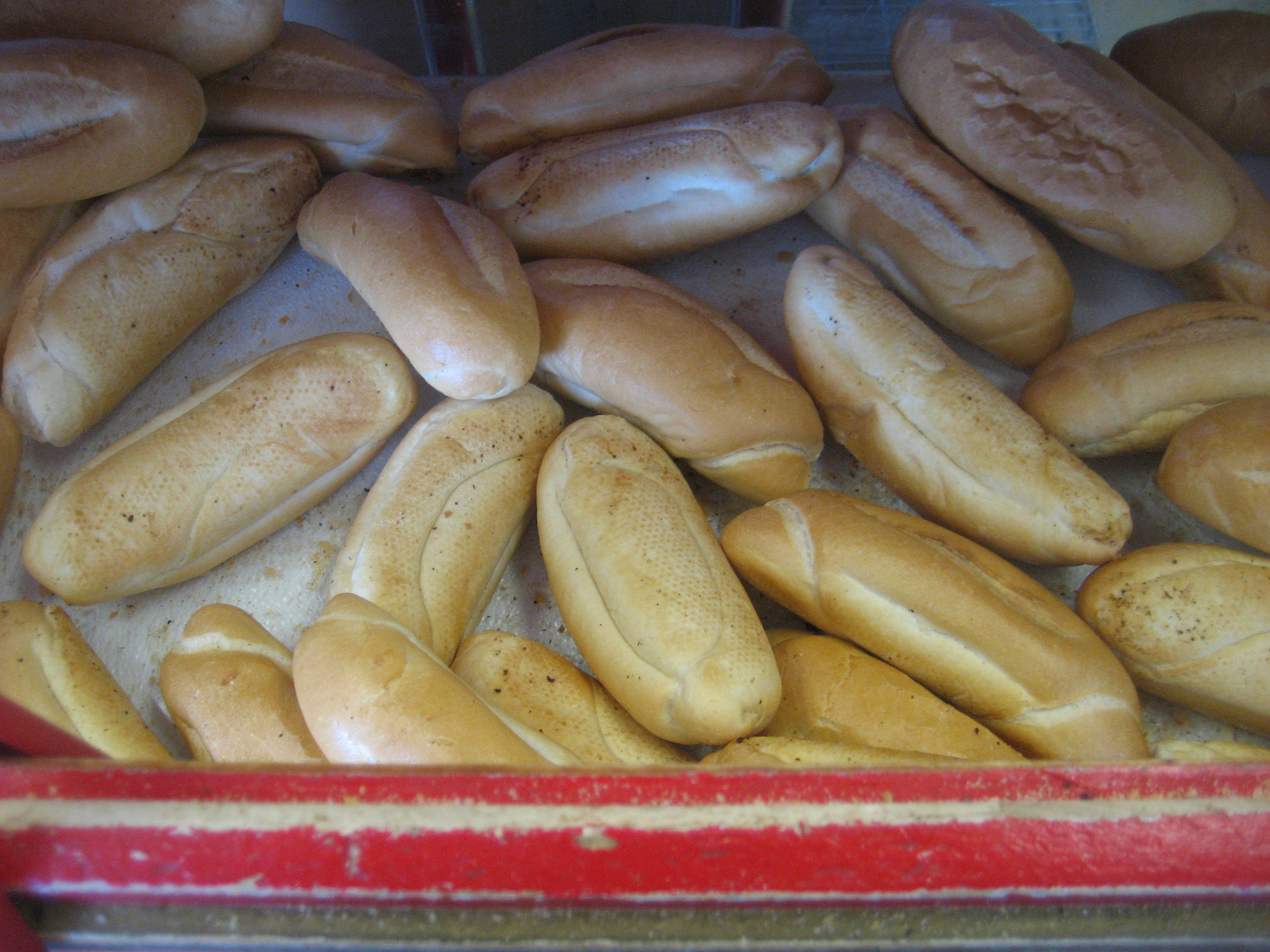
Loaves of bánh mì at Dong Phuong Oriental Bakery in New Orleans

A Vietnamese baguette has a thin crust and white, airy crumb. It may consist of both wheat flour and rice flour.

Besides being made into a sandwich, it is eaten alongside meat dishes, such as bò kho (a beef stew), curry, and phá lấu. It can also be dipped in condensed milk (see Sữa Ông Thọ).

=== Filling basics ===
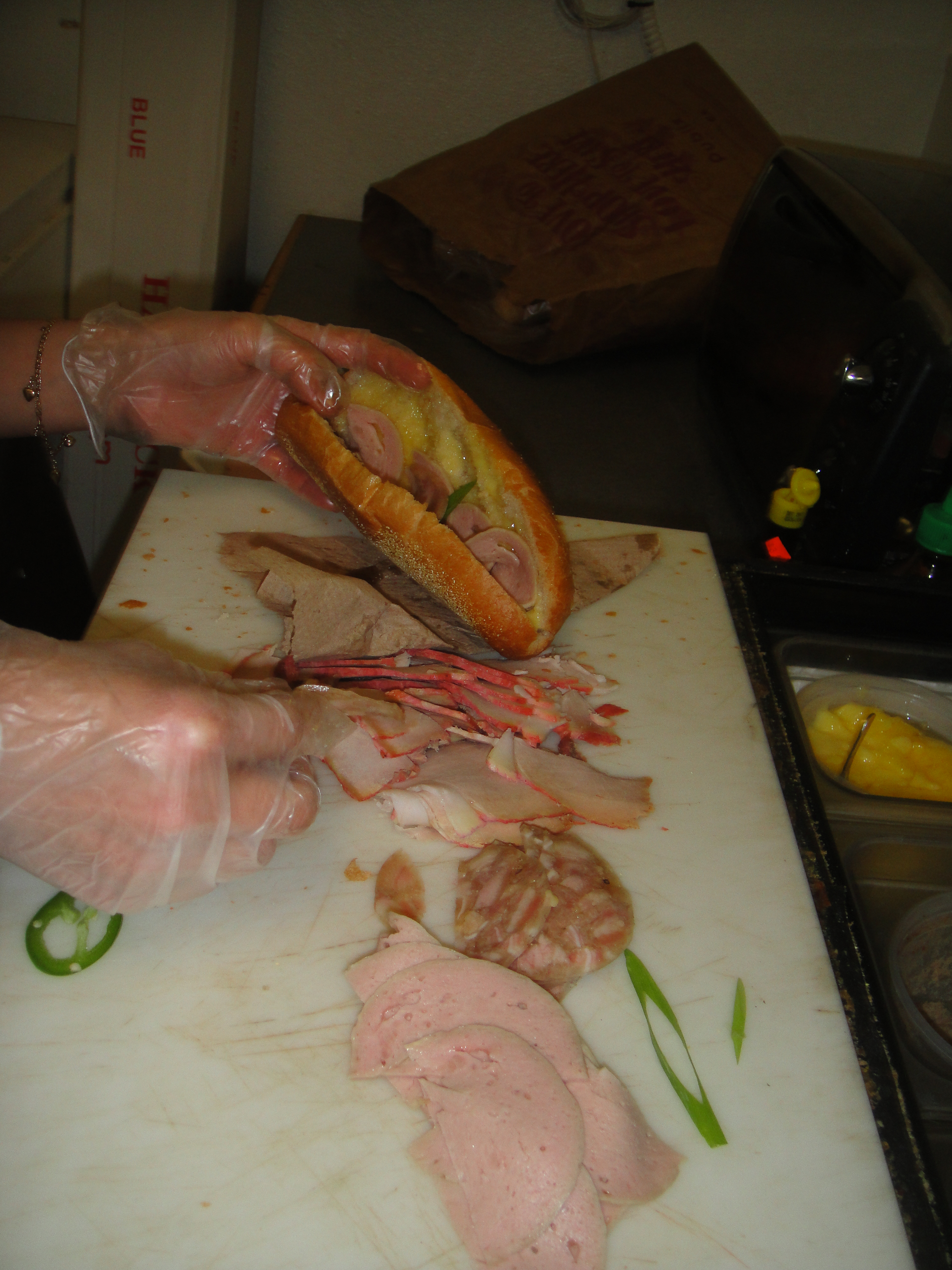
Assembling a bánh mì

A bánh mì sandwich typically consists of a main filling of one or more meats, together with accompanying vegetables, and condiments.

Accompanying vegetables typically include fresh cucumber slices or wedges, leaves of the coriander plant and pickled carrot and daikon in shredded form (đồ chua). Common condiments include spicy chili sauce, sliced chilis, seasoning sauce, and mayonnaise. These sandwiches can even be filled with seared tofu.

=== Main filling varieties ===
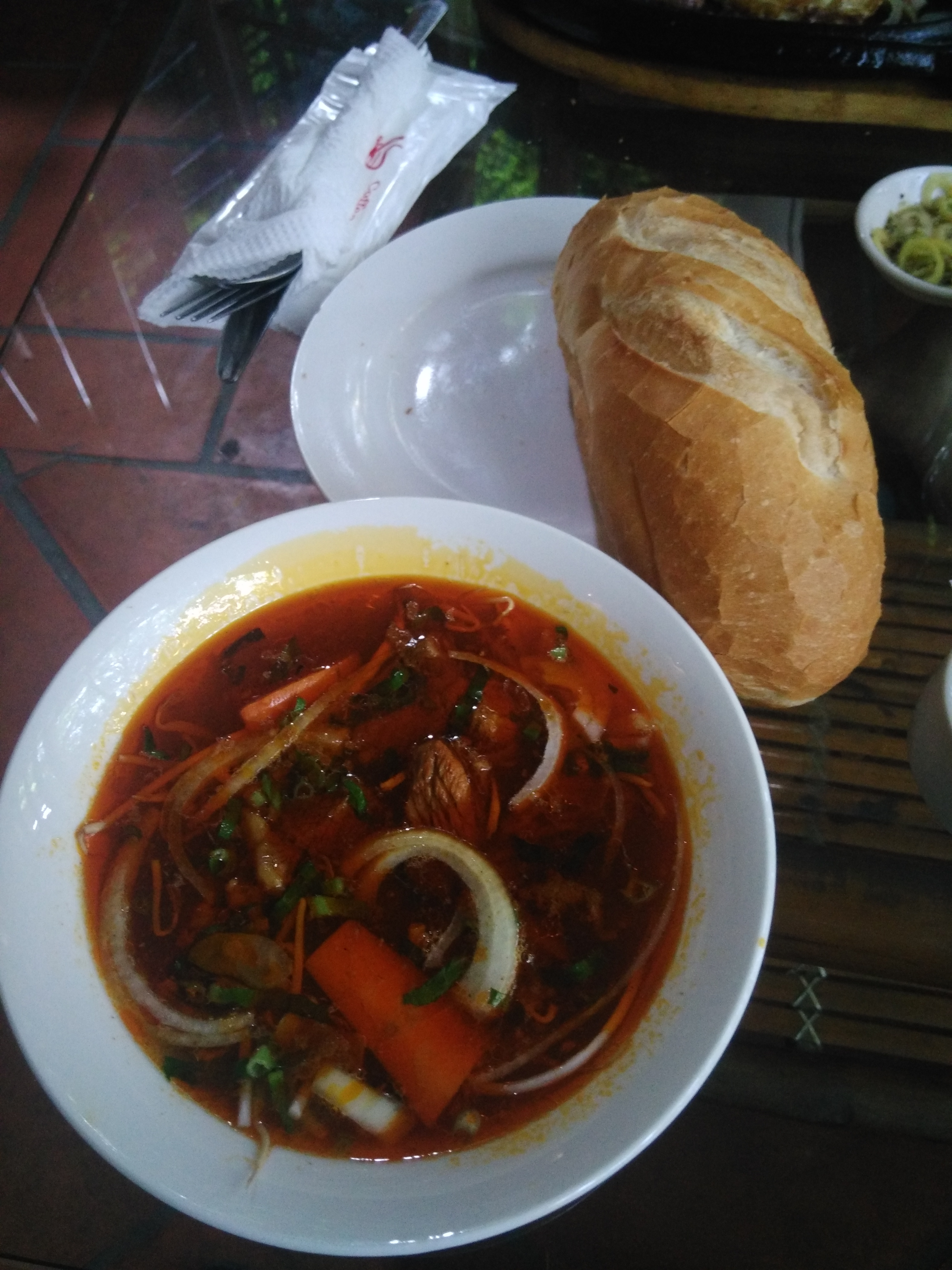
Bánh mì to eat with bò kho

Many varieties of main filling are used. A typical bánh mì shop in the United States offers at least 10 varieties.

The most popular variety is bánh mì thịt, thịt meaning "meat". Bánh mì thịt nguội (also known as bánh mì pâté chả thịt, bánh mì đặc biệt, or "special combo") is made with various Vietnamese cold cuts, such as sliced pork or pork belly, chả lụa (Vietnamese sausage), and head cheese, along with the liver pâté and vegetables like carrot or cucumbers.

Other varieties include:

- Bánh mì bì (shredded pork sandwich) – shredded pork or pork skin, doused with fish sauce
- Bánh mì chà bông (pork floss sandwich)
- Bánh mì xíu mại (minced pork meatball sandwich) – smashed pork meatballs
- bánh mì thịt nguội (ham sandwich)
- Bánh mì cá mòi (sardine sandwich)
- Bánh mì pa-tê (pâté sandwich)
- Bánh mì xá xíu or bánh mì thịt nướng (barbecue pork sandwich)
- Bánh mì chả lụa or bánh mì giò lụa (Vietnamese sausage sandwich)
- Bánh mì gà nướng (grilled chicken sandwich)
- Bánh mì chay (vegetarian sandwich) – made with tofu or seitan
- Bánh mì chả cá (fish patty sandwich)
- Bánh mì bơ (margarine or buttered sandwich) – margarine / butter and sugar
- Bánh mì trứng ốp-la (fried egg sandwich) – contains fried eggs with onions, sprinkled with soy sauce, sometimes buttered; served for breakfast in Vietnam
- Bánh mì kẹp kem (ice cream sandwich) – contains scoops of ice cream topped with crushed peanuts
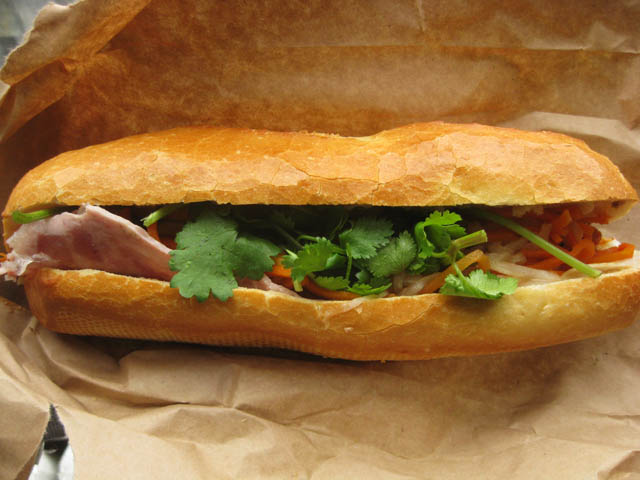
Bánh mì chả lụa (pork sausage sandwich)

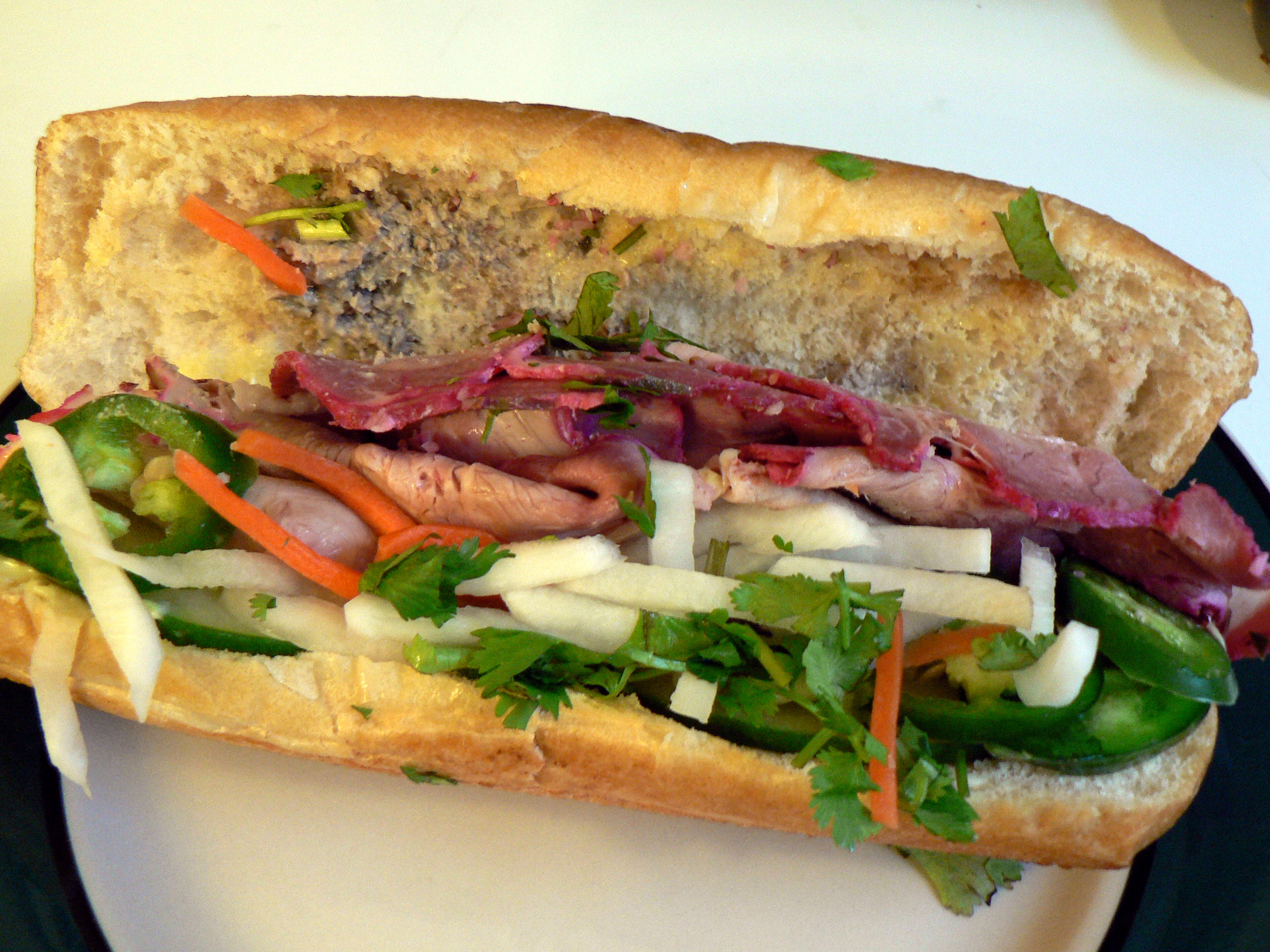
Bánh mì đặc biệt ("special combo" sandwich)

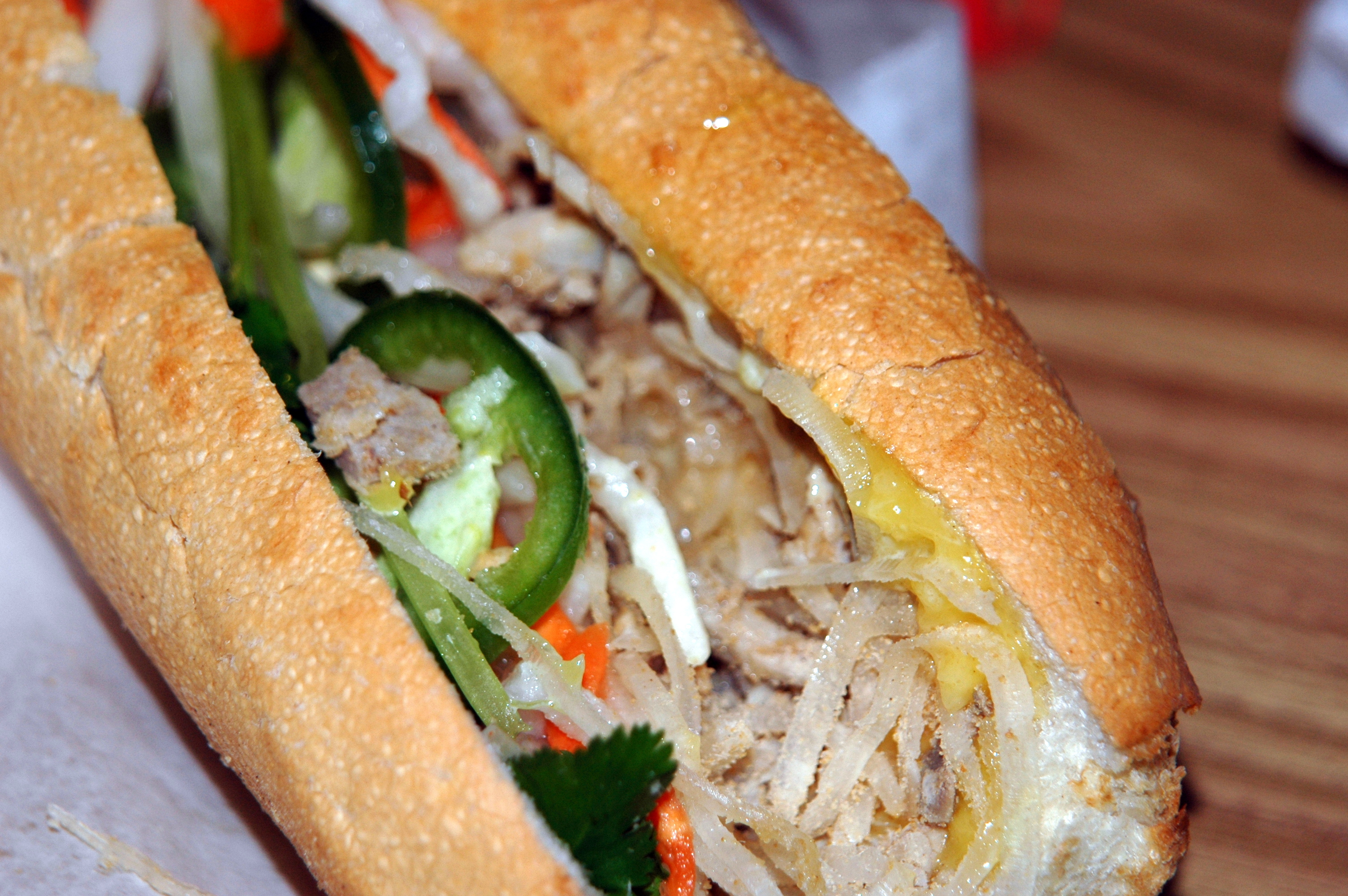
Bánh mì bì (shredded pork sandwich) at Eden Center

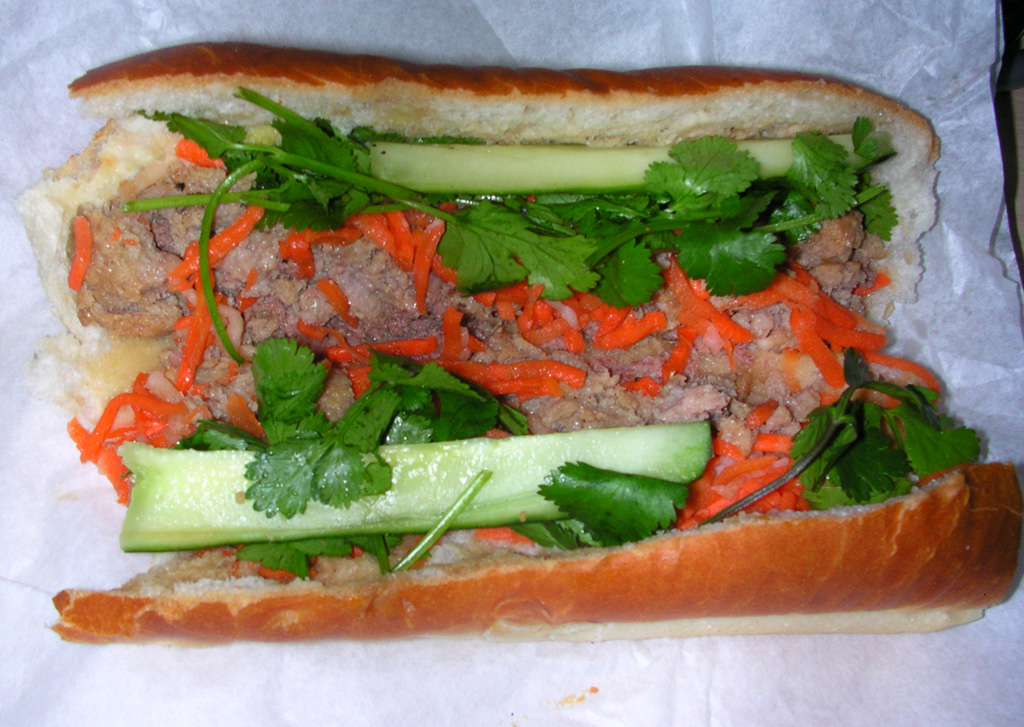
Bánh mì xíu mại (minced pork meatball sandwich)

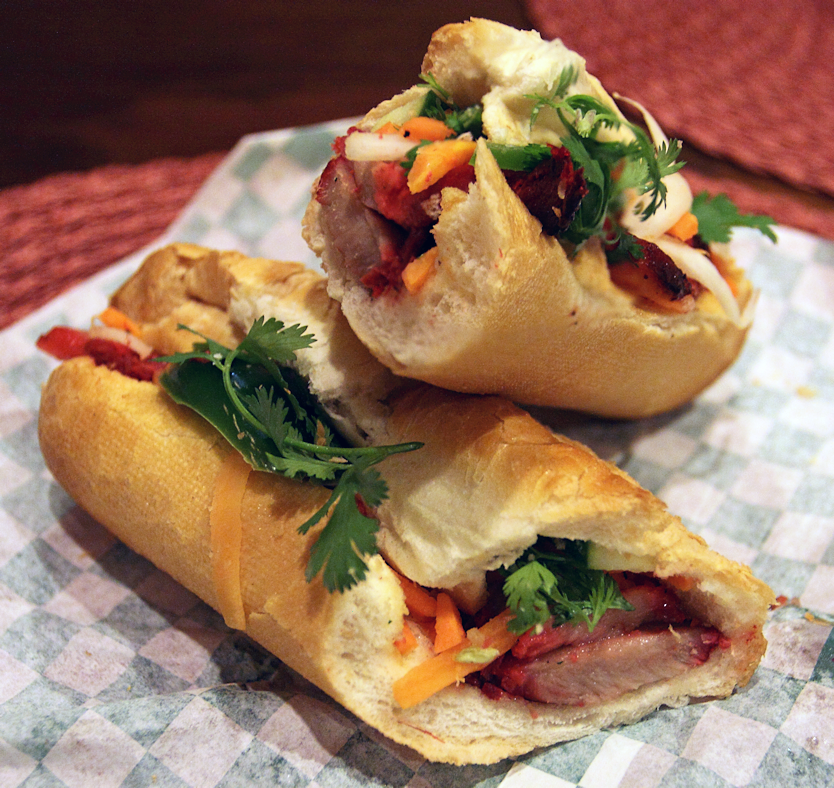
Bánh mì thịt nướng (barbecue pork sandwich)

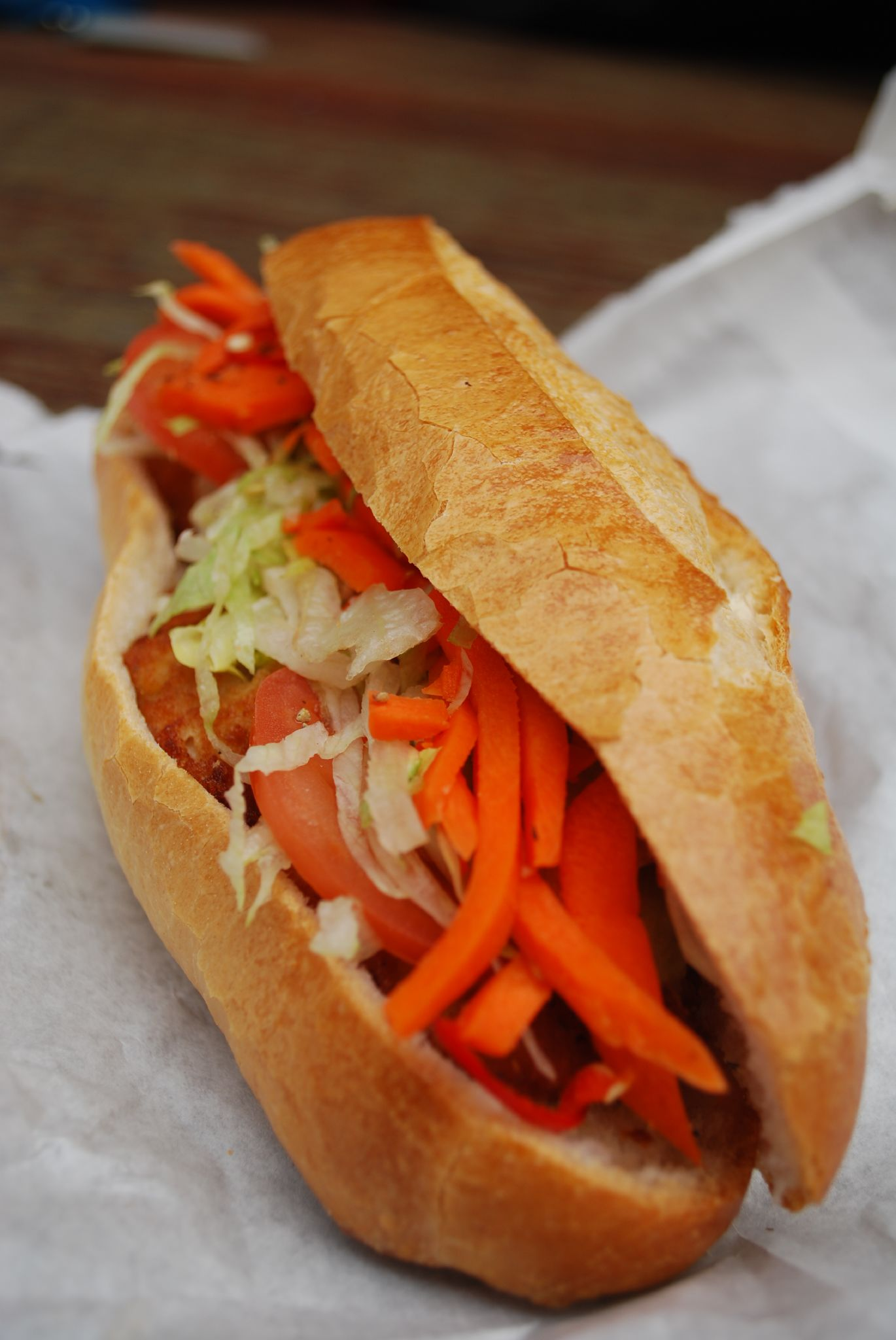
with Chicken Schnitzel

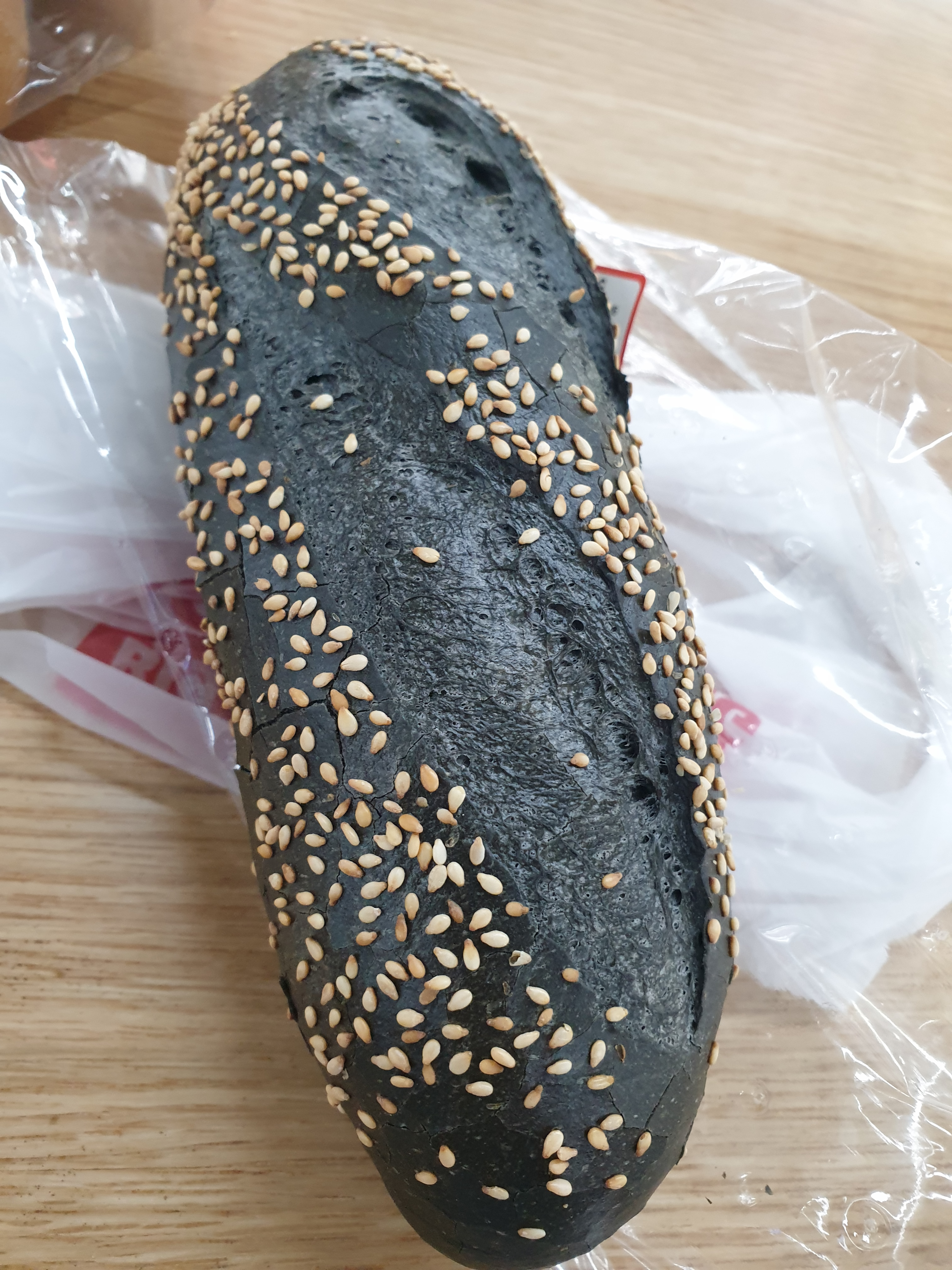
Bánh mì than tre (Bamboo charcoal bánh mì)

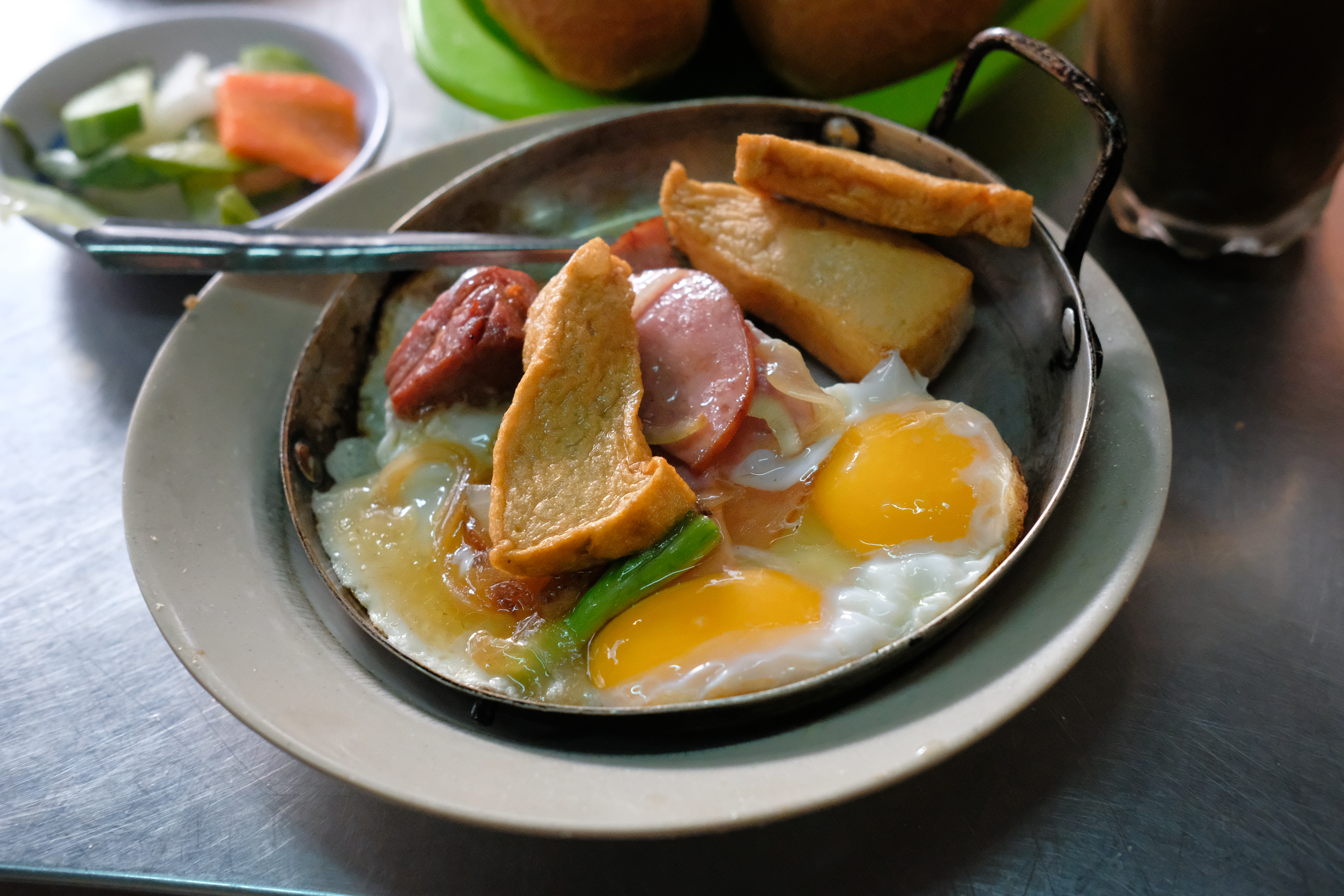
Bánh mì chảo

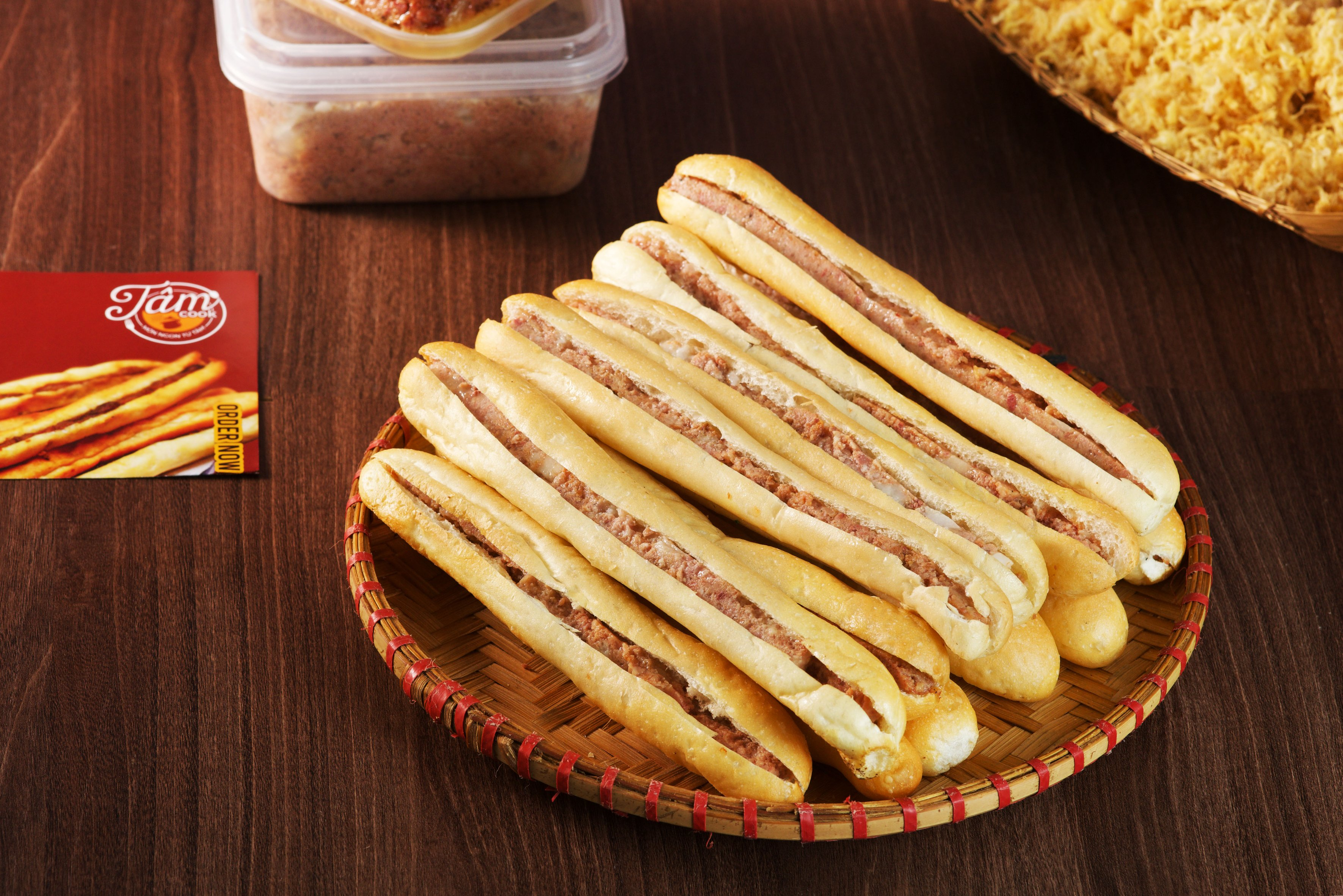
Bánh mỳ que

Nowadays, different types of bánh mì are popular. For example, bánh mì que is thinner and longer and can be filled with various ingredients just as normal bánh mì.

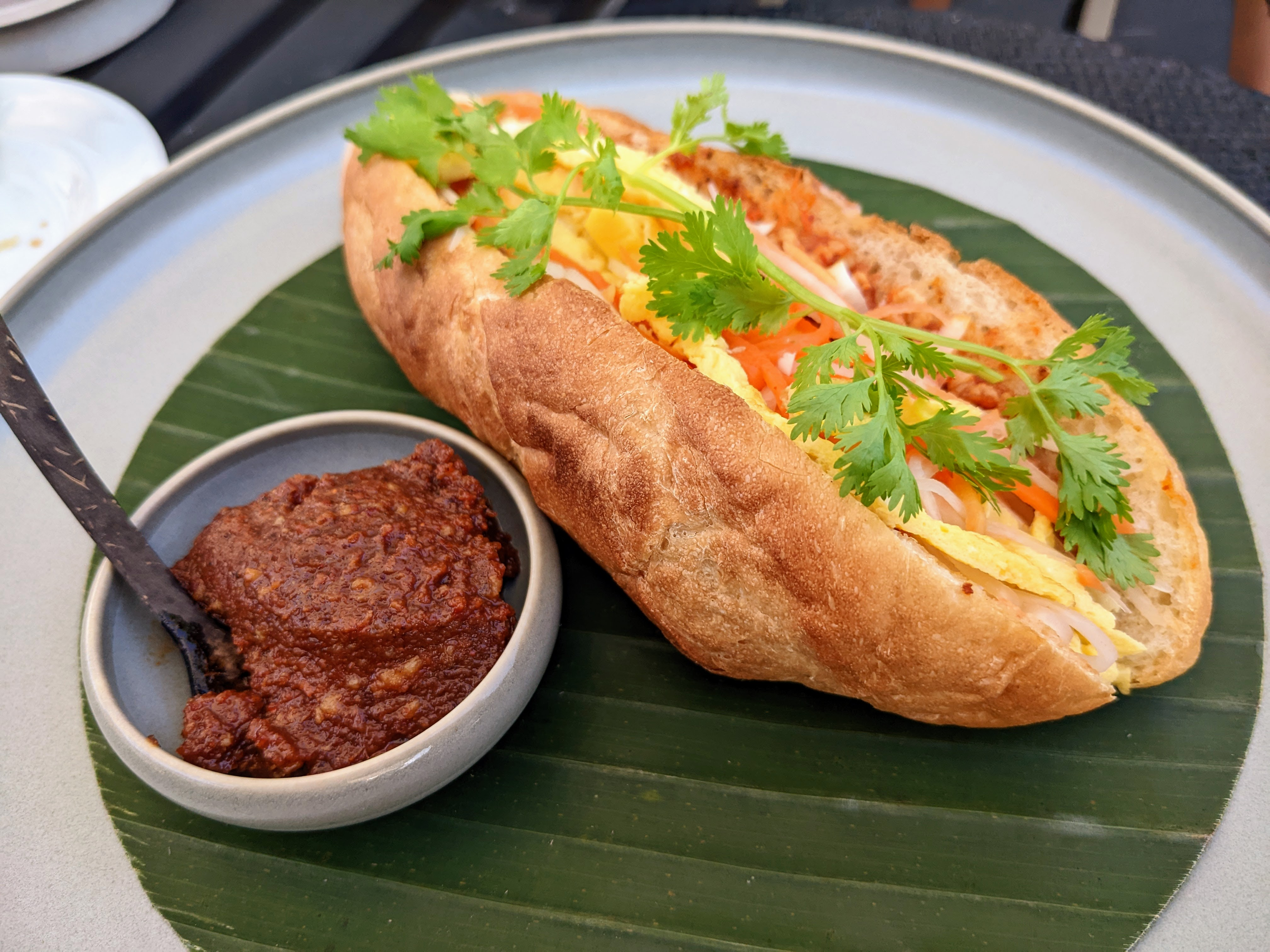
Khao jee pâté in Laos, with spice paste called Jeow bong

== Notable vendors ==
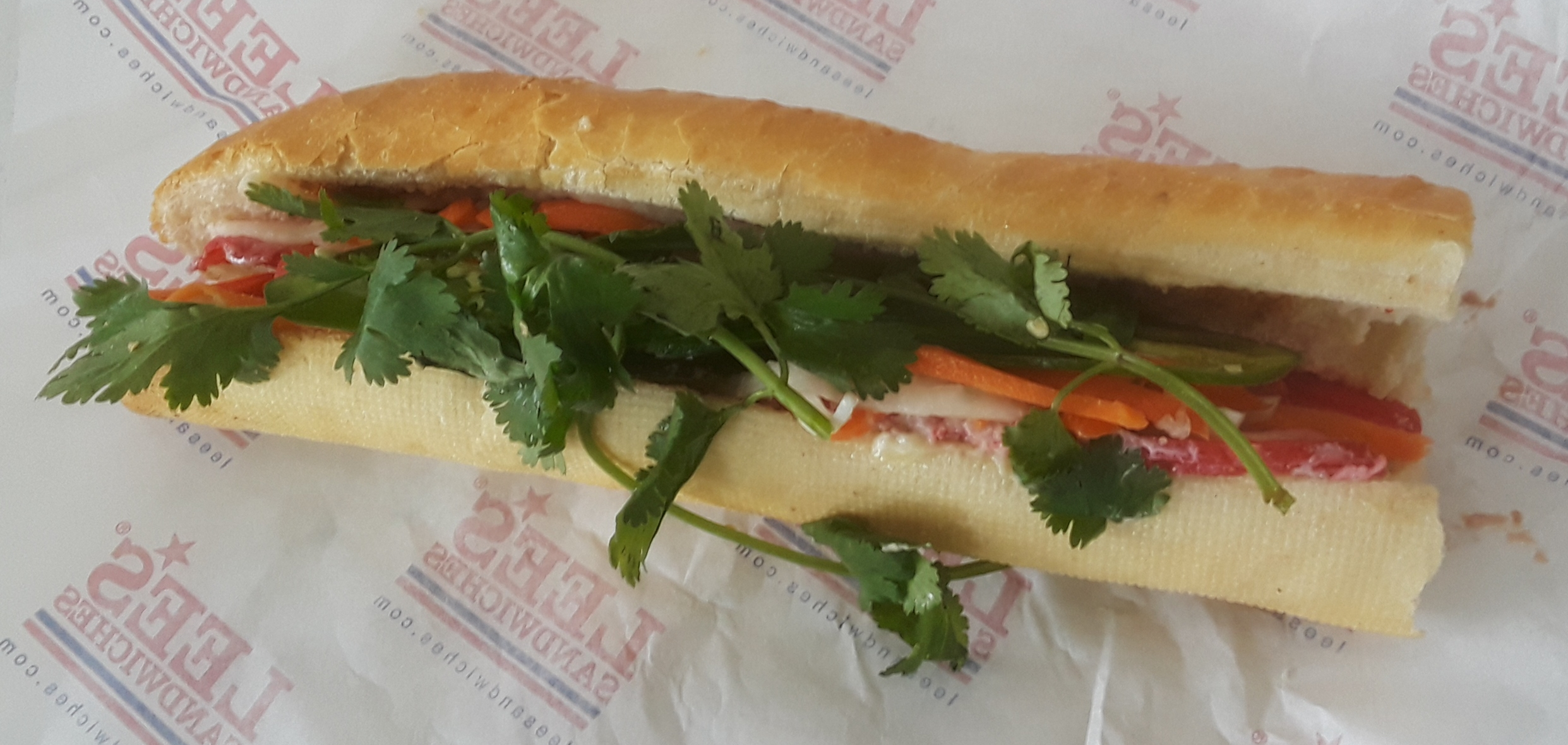
Bánh mì sold in Lee's Sandwiches

Prior to the Fall of Saigon in 1975, well-known South Vietnamese bánh mì vendors included Bánh mì Ba Lẹ and Bánh mì Như Lan (which opened in 1968).

In the 21st century, McDonald's and Paris Baguette locations in Vietnam offer bánh mì.

== Around the world ==
=== Australia ===
In the decade after the Vietnam war, around 94,000 Vietnamese refugees migrated to Australia. Some refugees opened bakeries that specialised in bánh mì, particularly around Western Melbourne, South-Western Sydney and South-Western Brisbane. Today, Bánh mì is highly popular as an affordable snack across Australia, especially amongst tradespeople. In 2022, there were over 300 shops that sell Bánh mì in Melbourne alone. This includes fast food chain Roll'd and various Vietnamese-run bakeries.

An Australian-based "Vietnamese Banh Mi Appreciation Society" was created on Facebook in 2017. As of January 2026, it had 155,000 members. Australian-made bánh mì and their makers also feature on TikTok. As of the same month, a recent TikTok review of Top Ryde Baker's House, a family-run bánh mì-making business in Ryde, a suburb of Sydney, had had 1.5 million views. Additionally, a bánh mì made by another Sydney-based business, Marrickville Pork Roll, which has numerous outlets around the city, has featured in an Instagram post by Australia's Prime Minister, Anthony Albanese.

In November 2025, a limited time special "Zinger Bánh Mì" roll was added to the nationwide menu of KFC Australia. It was made up of "... [a] spicy Zinger chicken fillet with slaw, fresh chillies, coriander, a new Bánh Mì-style mayonnaise, and Supercharged sauce, all served in a traditional Bánh Mì roll." Although a trial of the item had been successful earlier in the year in Newcastle, New South Wales, the nationwide launch proved to be controversial. So, for example, whereas a This is Canberra reviewer described the product as "glorious", a reviewer in The Guardian dubbed it "... bánh mì by name but not nature ... the Dannii Minogue of chicken sandwiches."

=== Hong Kong ===
Banh Mi Nem, Hong Kong's only Vietnamese eatery in the Michelin selected list, specialises in bánh mì. Opened in 2024 by a Vietnamese person who had lived in Hong Kong for almost 20 years, it was the first bánh mì shop in Wan Chai. Unlike most local bánh mì outlets, which use French-style baguettes, its bread is Vietnamese-style. After receiving Michelin recognition within a year of its launching, the business opened a second outlet, in Central.

=== United States ===
In regions of the United States with significant populations of Vietnamese Americans, numerous bakeries and fast food restaurants specialize in bánh mì. Lee's Sandwiches, a fast food chain with locations in several states, specializes in Vietnamese sandwiches served on French baguettes (or traditional bánh mì at some locations) as well as Western-style sandwiches served on croissants. Phở Hòa, a Vietnamese-American restaurant chain primarily specializing in pho, also offers bánh mì as part of its menu.

In New Orleans, Dong Phuong Oriental Bakery is known for the bánh mì bread that it distributes to restaurants throughout the city. After 1975, Ba Lẹ owner Võ Văn Lẹ fled to the United States and, along with Lâm Quốc Thanh, founded Bánh mì Ba Lê. The Eden Center shopping center in Northern Virginia has several well-known bakeries specializing in bánh mì. In New York City, Banh Anh Em, a Vietnamese food shop with hand made bánh mì prominent amongst its offerings, opened for business in April 2025; by early 2026, it was already included in the Michelin Guide 2025 Bib Gourmand list, and had lines of customers waiting more than an hour to be served.

Mainstream fast food chains have also incorporated bánh mì and other Vietnamese dishes into their portfolios. Yum! Brands operates a chain of bánh mì cafés called Bánh Shop. The former Chipotle-owned ShopHouse Southeast Asian Kitchen chain briefly sold bánh mì. Jack in the Box offered a "bánh mì–inspired" fried chicken sandwich as part of its Food Truck Series.

== See also ==
- Khao jee pâté
- Num pang
- French roll
- List of sandwiches
- Vietnamese cuisine
