= Bibibop Asian Grill =

American restaurant chain

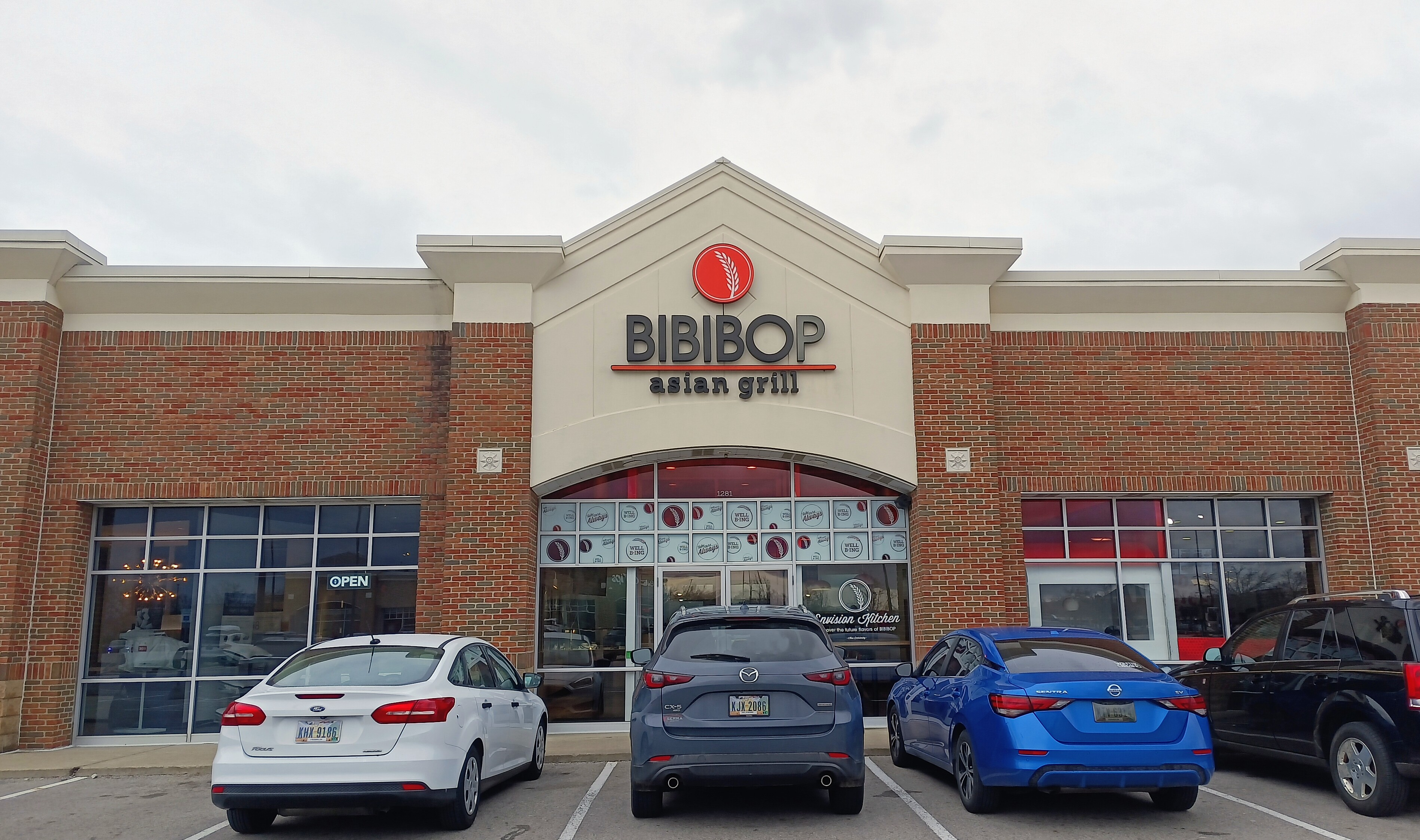
- A Bibibop Asian Grill in Columbus, Ohio
- Type: Private
- Industry: Restaurants
- Founded: 2013; 13 years ago
- Founder: Charley Shin
- Headquarters: Columbus, Ohio, U.S.
- Number of locations: 74 (2025)
- Area served: United States
- Key people: Charley Shin (owner and CEO); Chris Artinian (president and COO)
- Products: Rice bowls
- Website: bibibop.com

Bibibop Asian Grill is an American fast casual restaurant chain specializing in customizable Korean rice bowls. As of 2025, it has 74 locations. Its name derives from bibimbap, a Korean rice dish made with seasoned vegetables, chili pepper paste, and sometimes egg and meat.

Bibibop has been described as "an Asian take on Chipotle." It was founded in 2013 in Columbus, Ohio, by Korean American entrepreneur Charley Shin, the founder of Charleys Cheesesteaks.

== History ==
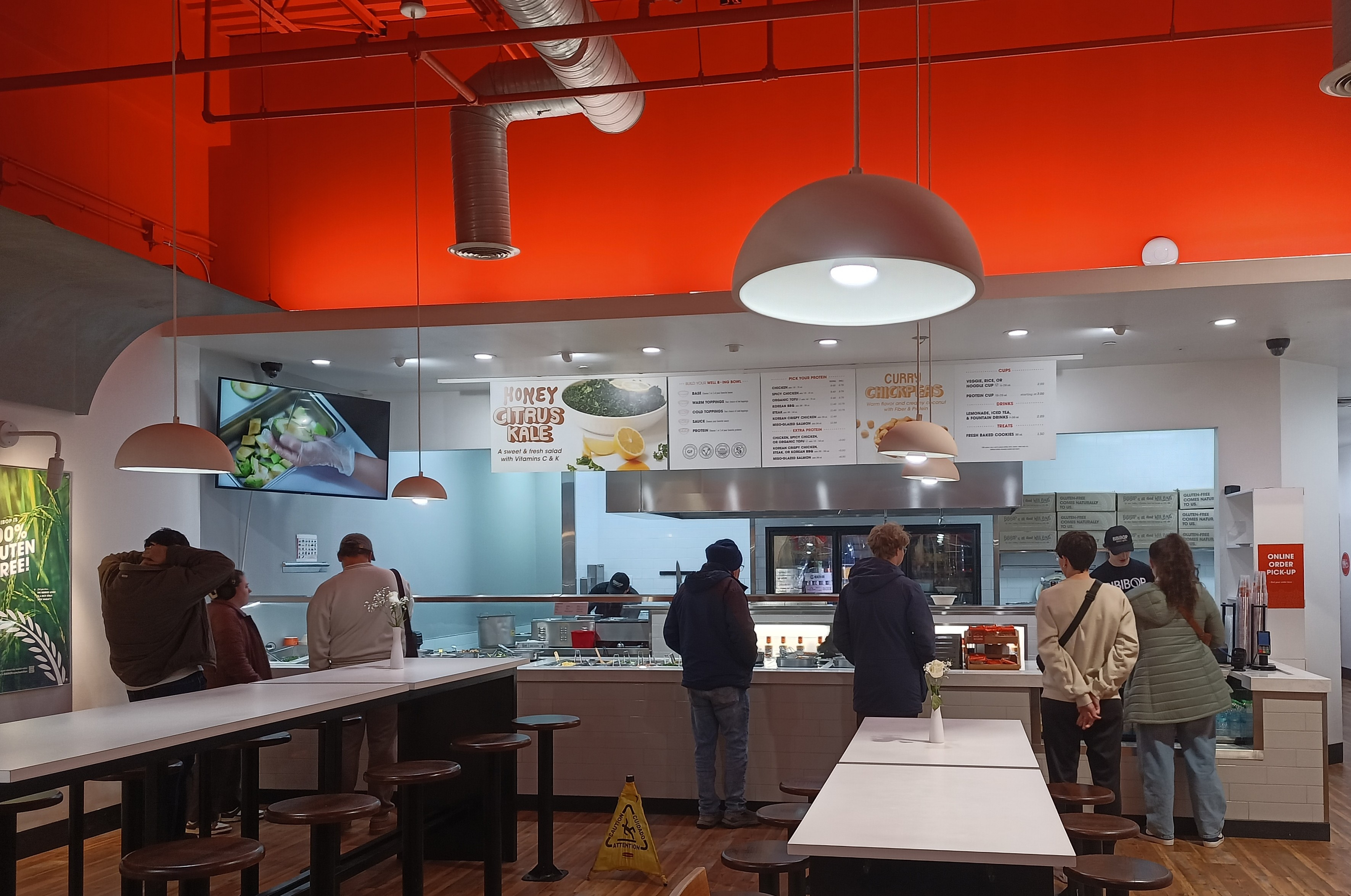
Restaurant interior

Shin, who had worked with his mother at her restaurants and was also inspired by his mother's cooking, thought of the concept after praying. A week after, real estate developer Herb Glimcher offered Shin a deal on two real estate properties. Afterwards, an executive at Shin's company suggested creating an Asian fast-food concept. With a group of people, including his sister Chung Choe and her daughter, they toured Asian-inspired restaurants in the Washington, D.C. area and decided to create a restaurant chain inspired by Korean cuisine. The first location opened in Grandview Heights, Ohio in 2013. The stores are entirely corporate owned.

Bibibop acquired the leases for all 15 ShopHouse Southeast Asian Kitchen locations in the Los Angeles, Chicago, and the Washington, D.C. metropolitan areas in 2017 after parent company Chipotle terminated its Asian fast casual food experiment. The acquisition allowed Bibibop to expand outside Ohio. Some of the former ShopHouse locations did not perform well and eventually closed. The chain was named one of the five Hot Concepts for 2017 by Nation's Restaurant News.

Bibibop opened its 50th location in Delaware, Ohio, in April 2023. In 2025, it added nine new menu items and discontinued three.

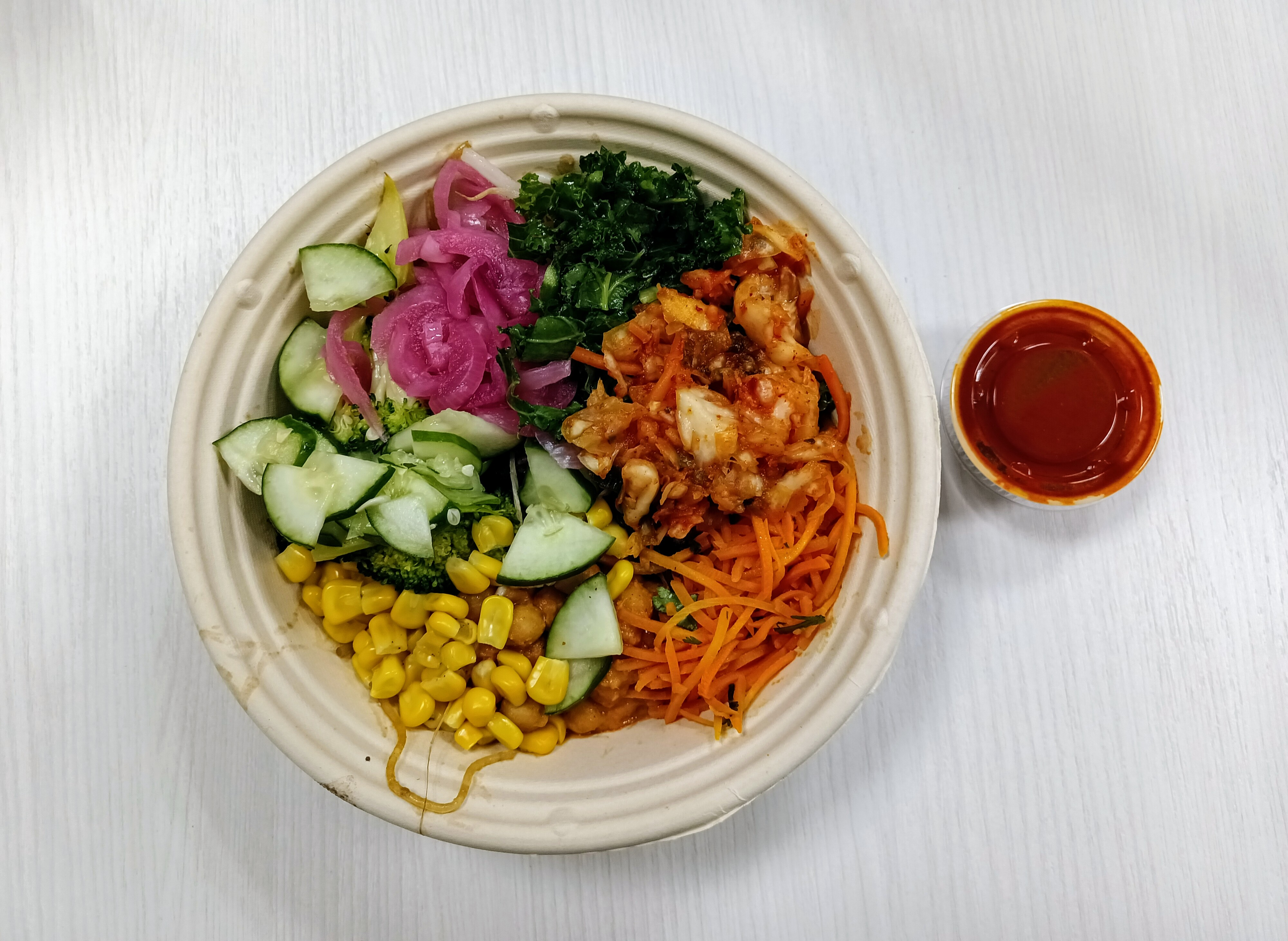
Veggie bowl with gochujang from Bibibop
