= Charleys Cheesesteaks =

American restaurant chain

- A Charley's Philly Steaks outlet in Knoxville, Tennessee
- Trade name: Charleys
- Formerly: Charley's Steakery (1986–2002); Charley's Grilled Subs (2002–2012)
- Type: Private
- Industry: Food Franchising
- Genre: Fast casual
- Founded: 1986; 40 years ago
- Founders: Charley Shin
- Headquarters: Columbus, Ohio, United States
- Number of locations: 600 (2017)
- Area served: Worldwide
- Key people: Charley Shin (CEO); Debbie Allison (Vice President)
- Products: Cheesesteaks, grilled subs, french fries, soft drinks
- Revenue: US$534 million (2021)
- Owner: Gosh Enterprises
- Number of employees: 3,000 (2021)
- Website: charleys.com

Charleys Cheesesteaks, officially Charleys Philly Steaks, is an American restaurant chain specializing in Philly cheesesteak headquartered in Columbus, Ohio. Formerly known as Charley's Steakery and Charley's Grilled Subs, the franchise was established in 1986 on the campus of Ohio State University. By 2017 there were 600 locations in 45 states and in 19 countries. Charleys is believed to have doubled in size in 2021. In addition to traditional Philly cheesesteaks, the chain also has other steak based sandwiches and multiple grilled chicken sandwiches, among other grilled sandwiches.

== History ==
While studying real estate at Ohio State University, Korean American Charley Shin worked in his mother's Japanese/Korean restaurant in Columbus, Ohio. While taking a trip to New York City, the Shins took a detour to Philadelphia, resulting in Charley's discovery of the Philly cheesesteak. Charley convinced his mother to take a break, sell the restaurant, and invest her life savings of $48,000 in "Charley's," a 450-square-foot (42 m^{2}) restaurant across the street from Ohio State's campus.

== Gosh Enterprises ==
Charleys Philly Steaks is a subsidiary of Gosh Enterprises, which is solely owned by Shin. Gosh also owns the Bibibop Asian Grill chain, which had purchased the leases for the defunct ShopHouse Southeast Asian Kitchen chain.
