= Khao jee pâté =

Laotian street sandwich

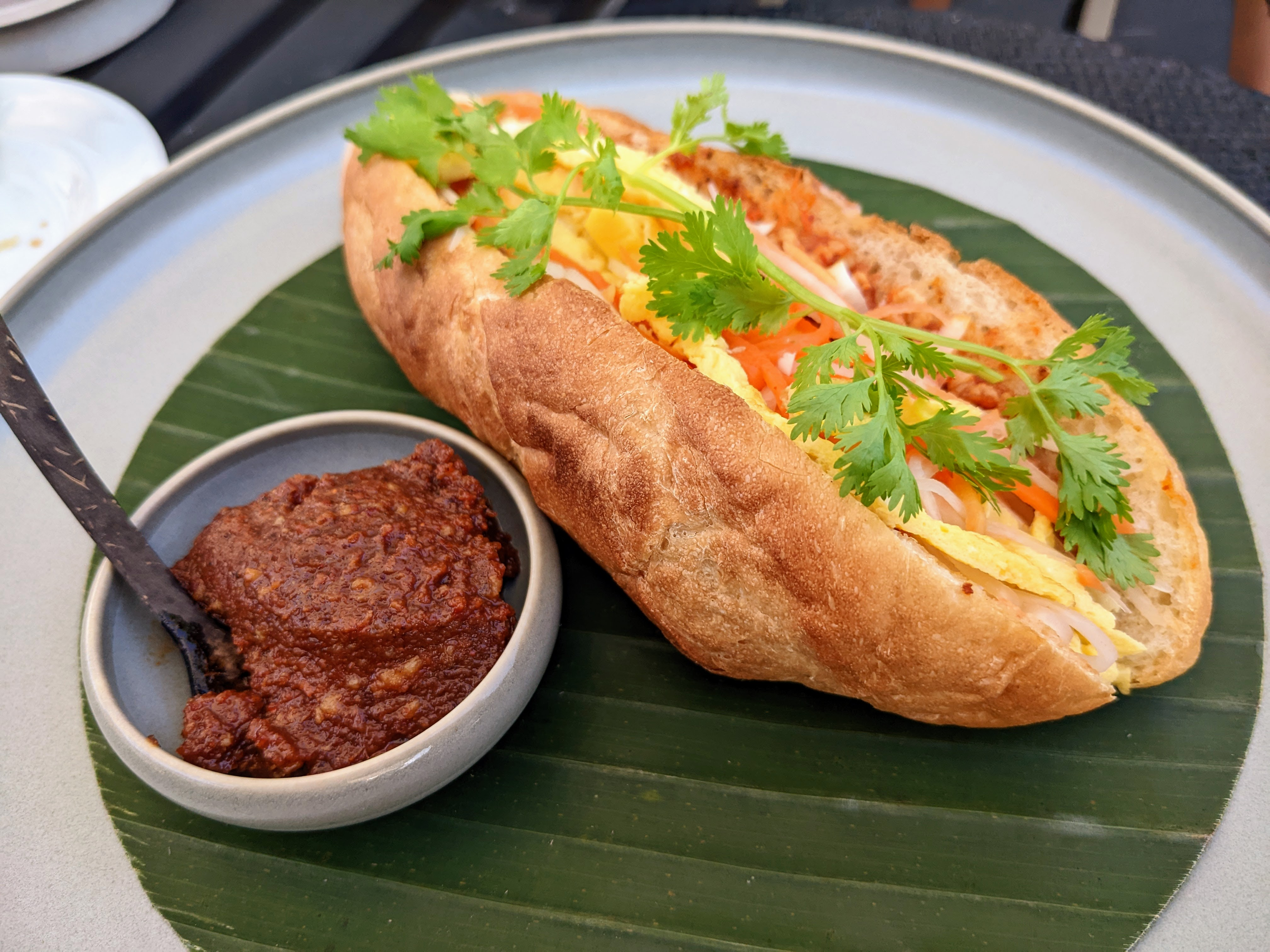
- Khao jee pâté with jeow bong
- Alternative names: Lao baguette sandwich, Khao Jee
- Type: Sandwich
- Place of origin: Laos
- Main ingredients: Baguette, sai gok, pork, ham, papaya, carrot, scallions or shallots, mint, cilantro, pâté, jeow bong
- Similar dishes: bánh mì, num pang

Khao jee pâté (Lao: ເຂົ້າຈີ່ປາເຕ, romanized: khao chi pate, pronounced [kʰȁ(ː)w tɕīː pàː.tèː]), is a Lao baguette-based sandwich, similar to Vietnam's bánh mì and Cambodia's num pang. It is a famous street food found throughout Laos. The baguette or French bread was introduced to Laos when Laos was ruled under French Indochina.

The sandwich is made by splitting the baguette lengthways and spread with a thick layer of pork liver pâté, stuffed with pork or Lao sausage, sliced papaya, carrots, shallots or onion, cucumber, cilantro and sometimes Jeow bong or chili sauce. Khao jee paté should not be confused with Khao jee, another popular Lao traditional food, made of steamed sticky rice formed into patties coated with seasoned egg mixture and grilled over an open fire.

== See also ==
- List of sandwiches
- bánh mì
- num pang
