= ShopHouse Southeast Asian Kitchen =

American restaurant chain

- Type: Subsidiary
- Industry: Restaurants
- Founded: September 15, 2011; 14 years ago in Washington, DC
- Founder: Steve Ells; Nate Appleman; Tim Wildin
- Defunct: March 17, 2017; 9 years ago
- Fate: Closed
- Number of locations: 15 (July 2016)
- Area served: California, Illinois, Maryland, and Washington, DC
- Parent: Chipotle Mexican Grill
- Website: https://shophousekitchen.com (archive)

ShopHouse Southeast Asian Kitchen, or simply ShopHouse, was an American restaurant chain specializing in Southeast Asian cuisine. Its name derived from the shophouse, a common building type in urban Southeast Asia. The first ShopHouse opened in September 2011 in Washington, D.C. As of April 2016, there were a total of fourteen ShopHouse locations, in California, Chicago, Maryland, and Washington, D.C. ShopHouse was owned and operated by Chipotle Mexican Grill, and used a similar serving format.

Like Chipotle, ShopHouse restaurants were company-owned, rather than franchised. Its competitors included Panda Express, P. F. Chang's, Pick Up Stix, and to a small extent Noodles & Company. On October 25, 2016, founder, Steve Ells, said during an earnings call that the company "decided not to invest further in growing the ShopHouse brand." All ShopHouse locations were closed on March 17, 2017. After the restaurants closed, the leases for each restaurant were purchased by Gosh Enterprises and converted into new locations for Bibibop Asian Grill.

== Concept development ==
The ShopHouse concept was primarily developed by Chipotle's director of concept development Tim Wildin, who was born in Bangkok and spent all of his childhood summers there. Wildin had been working in the marketing department at Chipotle and realized that if he could follow Chipotle's business model and combine it with his knowledge of traditional Southeast Asian cuisine, he could bring the taste of his homeland to the American masses. Culinary manager Nate Appleman was responsible for developing some recipes and the procedures to produce the final product. Wildin was responsible with the look of the facilities, the locations of the restaurants, and marketing.

== History ==
The first ShopHouse opened on Connecticut Avenue, in the Dupont Circle neighborhood of Washington, D.C. Opened on September 15, 2011, the location was intended to test consumer response before further expansion. After almost two years, the second ShopHouse, the first on the West Coast, opened in Hollywood on June 17, 2013.

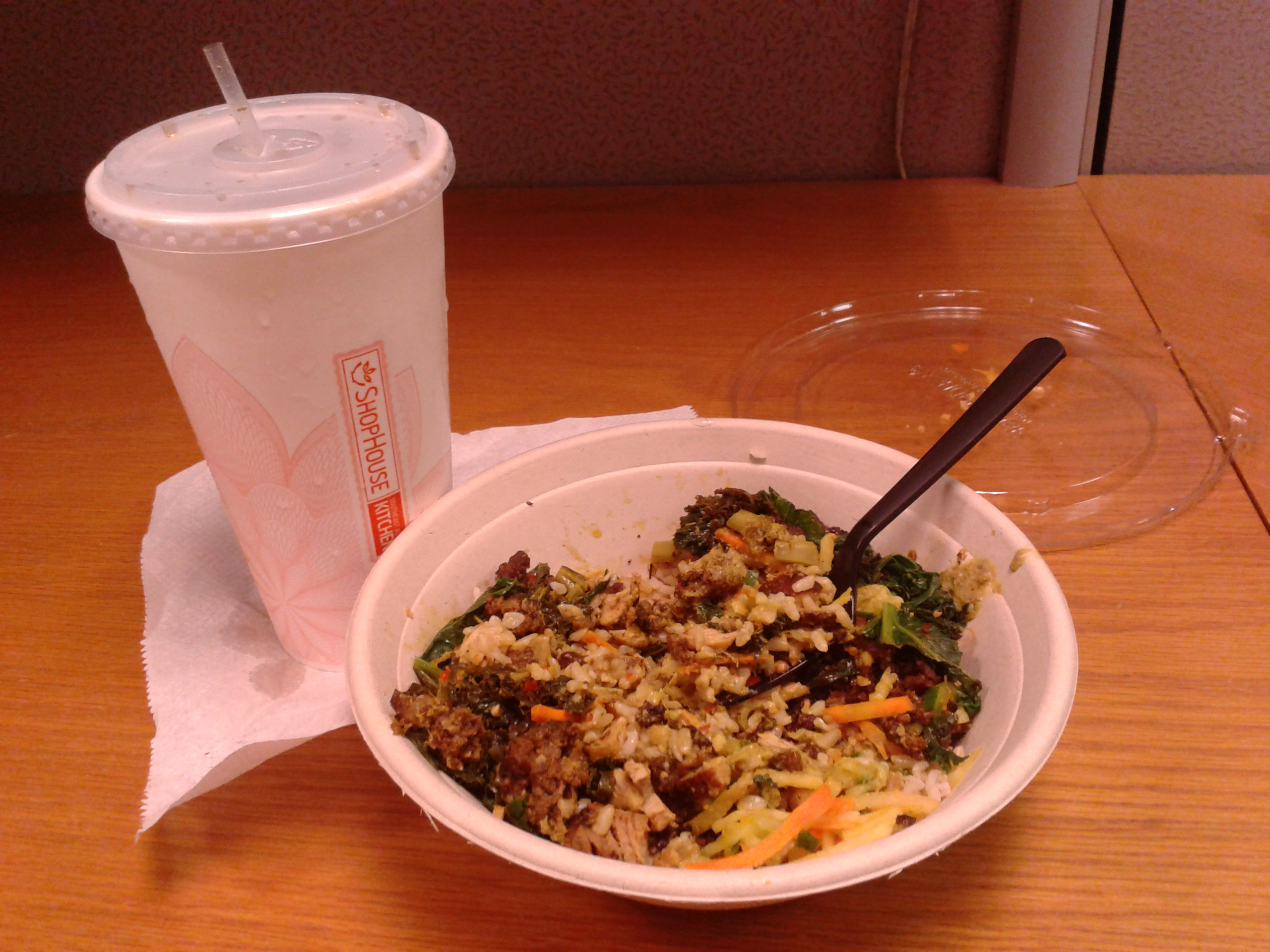
Lunch bowl and fountain soda from ShopHouse

In the last half of 2013, four new locations were quickly opened, two on each coast. A second D.C. location in Georgetown was opened in August. In October, a second Los Angeles-area location was opened in Santa Monica and also a location in Maryland opened in Bethesda on the other side of the country. At the end of 2013, a location in Westwood, Los Angeles was opened in December.

Three D.C.-area locations were opened in 2014; in D.C. Chinatown in May; at The Mall in Columbia in the D.C. suburb of Columbia, Maryland, as part of that mall's expansion; and at Union Station in D.C. in November.

After quite a bit of activity in 2014, a D.C.-area location in North Bethesda was opened in Maryland in March 2015 to make a total of 10 ShopHouse locations in the nation by the end of March 2015. The following year, a fourth location in Maryland was opened in Silver Spring in March 2016.

In 2014, The Motley Fool noted that Chipotle was expanding the ShopHouse concept rather slowly when compared with the expansion of Noodles & Company during the same time period. A writer for MarketWatch commented in 2015 that some of the procedures that Chipotle had developed for providing affordable quality burritos quickly "may not work with other cuisines". As of 2015, there had been on the average three new ShopHouses opened each year while there had been 150 new Chipotles opened annually during the same time period, or nearly three opens per week. ShopHouse defended their decision of having a relatively slow roll out by responding to their critics that they are still trying to shape the brand by getting everything done right before they duplicate the procedures and replicate it in a new location. In this way, they would like to provide great products in an efficient and cost effective manner that would entice customers to return frequently.

It was announced in May 2015 that the first location in the Midwest was planned to be opened in the Chicago Loop during Fall 2015. A further announcement was later made in October stating that a location in Schaumburg, Illinois, is planned to be open in November with another location is planned to be open in downtown Chicago in December. Both Illinois locations opened on schedule with great reviews along with a few minor complaints.

After a two years hiatus on the West Coast, a fourth Los Angeles area location was opened in July 2015 in El Segundo followed by a fifth L.A. location, the 15th in the nation, in July 2016 in West Hollywood. The West Hollywood location was the first case in which the restaurant shared a common wall, parking lot and outdoor patio with a Chipotle restaurant.

On October 25, 2016, founder, Steve Ells, said during an earnings call that the company "decided not to invest further in growing the ShopHouse brand." All ShopHouse locations were scheduled to close on March 17, 2017. All of the leases were acquired by Bibibop within a few weeks of the closings which allowed Bibibop to rapidly expand outside Ohio.

== Menu ==
ShopHouse food was mostly inspired by Malaysian, Thai, and Vietnamese cuisine. Customers start with a base of chilled rice noodles, jasmine rice, brown rice, or salad and choose meat (or tofu), a vegetable, a sauce, a garnish, and a topping. The restaurant provided several suggested combinations. Some ShopHouse locations served Southeast Asian beer, such as Beerlao, Chang, and Singha.

Initially, the restaurant served bánh mì in addition to bowls, but the sandwiches were quickly dropped a few months later after receiving mostly negative reviews on the quality of bread that was being used and ShopHouse's inability to find a dependable supplier of decent bread.

Unlike Chipotle, ShopHouse varied the ingredients available to their customers by adding seasonable vegetables to their menu that depended on local availability, such as kale, summer squash, butternut squash, parsnips, and collard greens.

In 2014, ShopHouse began to offer their first dessert, a coconut rice and mango parfait.

In 2016, the company began testing fried spring rolls at their West Hollywood location.

== Reception ==
Tom Sietsema of The Washington Post called ShopHouse "one of the best fast food ideas in years."

The reviewer for Midtown Lunch said the food was not as sweet as overly sweet foods found in the heavily Americanized Asian chain restaurants, but closer to the authentic cuisines. The reviewer also said that the food is spicier than what one would expect from a chain, great for people who enjoy spicier foods (and a wall full of additional hot sauces for person who don't think the food is spicy enough) but not so great for people who want relatively bland foods. The downside to the concept is that the flavors could easily get "muddled" by selecting the wrong combinations of components.

A food writer for Forbes Magazine who was born in Malaysia and specializes in writing about Asian cuisine, gave the chain a mixed review. Although she thought the individual components had great flavor, she believed that it is a big mistake for ShopHouse to allow the individual components to be mixed together in a single bowl and suggests that the food would taste better if components were kept separate, like in a bento. She wrote that "all those carefully crafted flavors were at the end muted and lost" and believed that the cause of the taste confusion is caused by "a lack of respect for national cuisines or even particular genres within national cuisines."

== See also ==
- List of defunct restaurants of the United States
- List of Thai restaurants
- List of Vietnamese restaurants
