= Bì cuốn =

Vietnamese pork and rice rolls

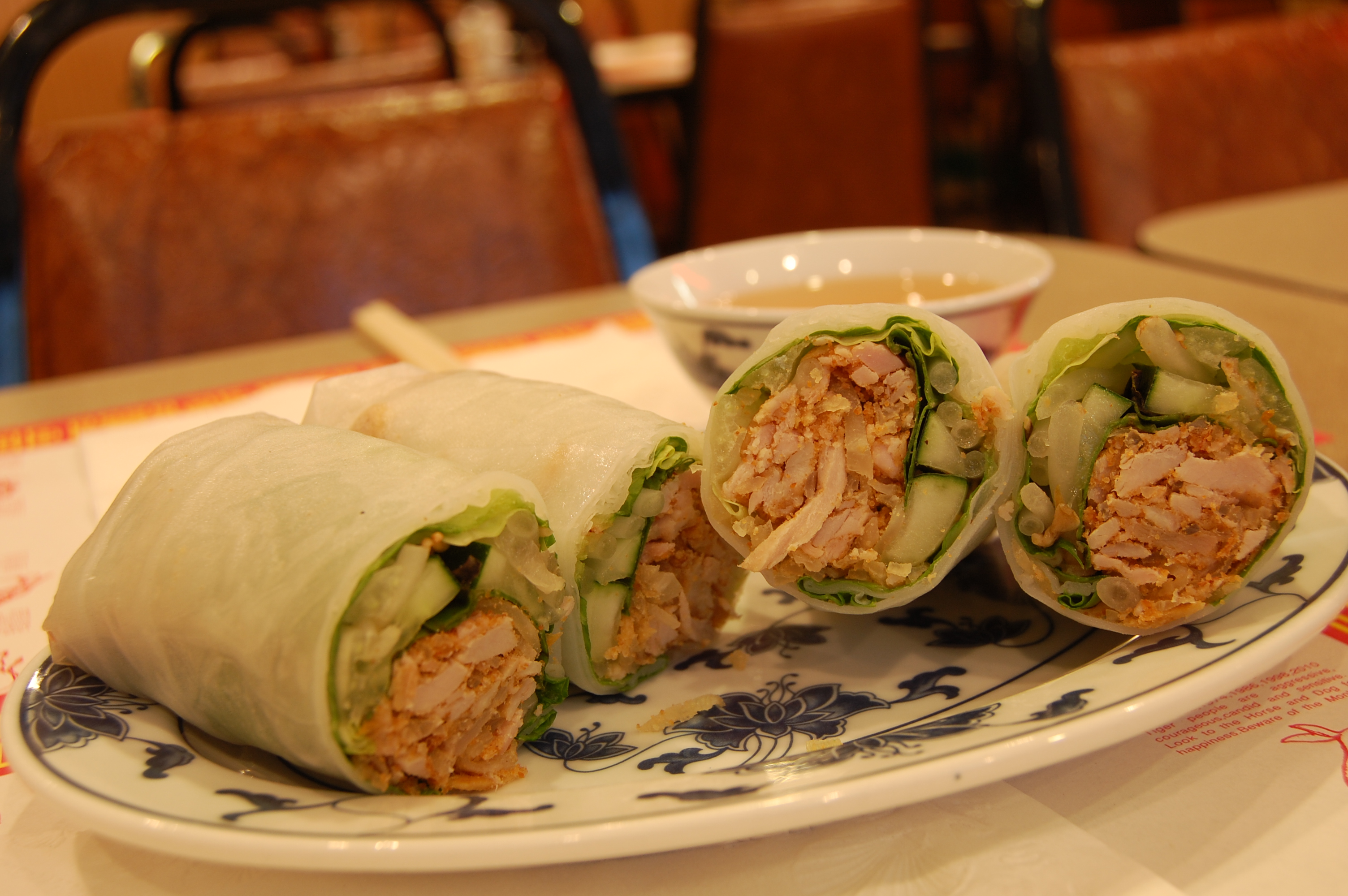
Bì cuốn

In Vietnamese cuisine, bì cuốn are pork and rice rolls. They are made from thinly shredded pork and skin, with rice, and ingredients often added are garlic sauce, lemon, sugar, chilli, pickles, and white radish and carrots.

== See also ==
- List of Vietnamese dishes
