= White soup =

White soup may refer to:

- Baitang (soup) (白汤; 白湯; báitāng; 'white soup'), a soup in Chinese cuisine
- Nsala soup, a soup in Nigerian cuisine
- Paitan (白湯; 'white soup'), a soup base in Japanese cuisine commonly used in ramen

== See also ==
- 白湯 (disambiguation) ('white soup' in Chinese and Japanese)
