= Vietnamese noodles =

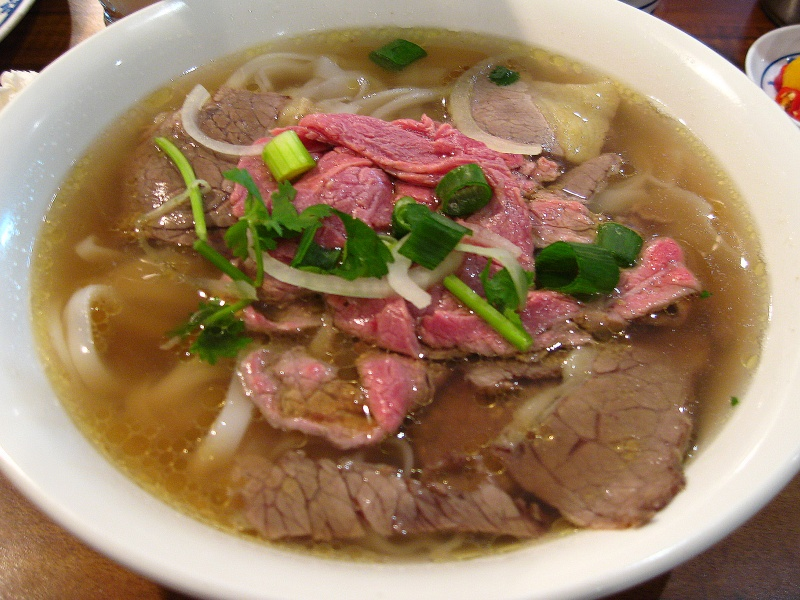
- A bowl of phở
- Type: Noodle
- Place of origin: Vietnam
- Variations: Many

Vietnamese cuisine includes many types of noodles. They come in different colors and textures and can be served wet or dry, hot or cold, and fresh, dried, or fried.

== Types of noodles ==
Vietnamese noodles are available in either fresh (tươi) or dried (khô) form.

- Bánh canh – thick noodles made from a mixture of rice flour and tapioca flour or wheat flour; similar in appearance, but not in substance, to udon
  - Bánh canh bột lọc – made from tapioca flour
  - Bánh canh Trảng Bàng – made from rice flour
  - Cháo canh – similar to bánh canh, popular in the North Central Coast region
- Bánh phở – flat rice noodles; these are available in a wide variety of widths and may be used for either phở soup or stir-fried dishes.
- Bún – thin white round noodles (often called rice vermicelli) steamed in leaves
- Mì – egg or wheat flour noodles
- Miến – cellophane clear glass noodles. Slightly chewy, thin, and cylindrical
- Bánh đa – red noodles used in Bánh đa cua
- Bánh tằm – thick, short rice noodles
- Bánh hỏi – very thin rice vermicelli made into sheets
- Bánh cuốn and Bánh ướt – sheets of broad rice noodles
- Nui – from French nouille, a Vietnamese version of macaroni
- Bánh gật gù – very thick rice cake from Quảng Ninh
- Cao lầu – a dish of noodles made from rice that has been soaked in lye water, usually served with pork and greens, from the city of Hội An

== Noodle dishes ==
=== From bún ===
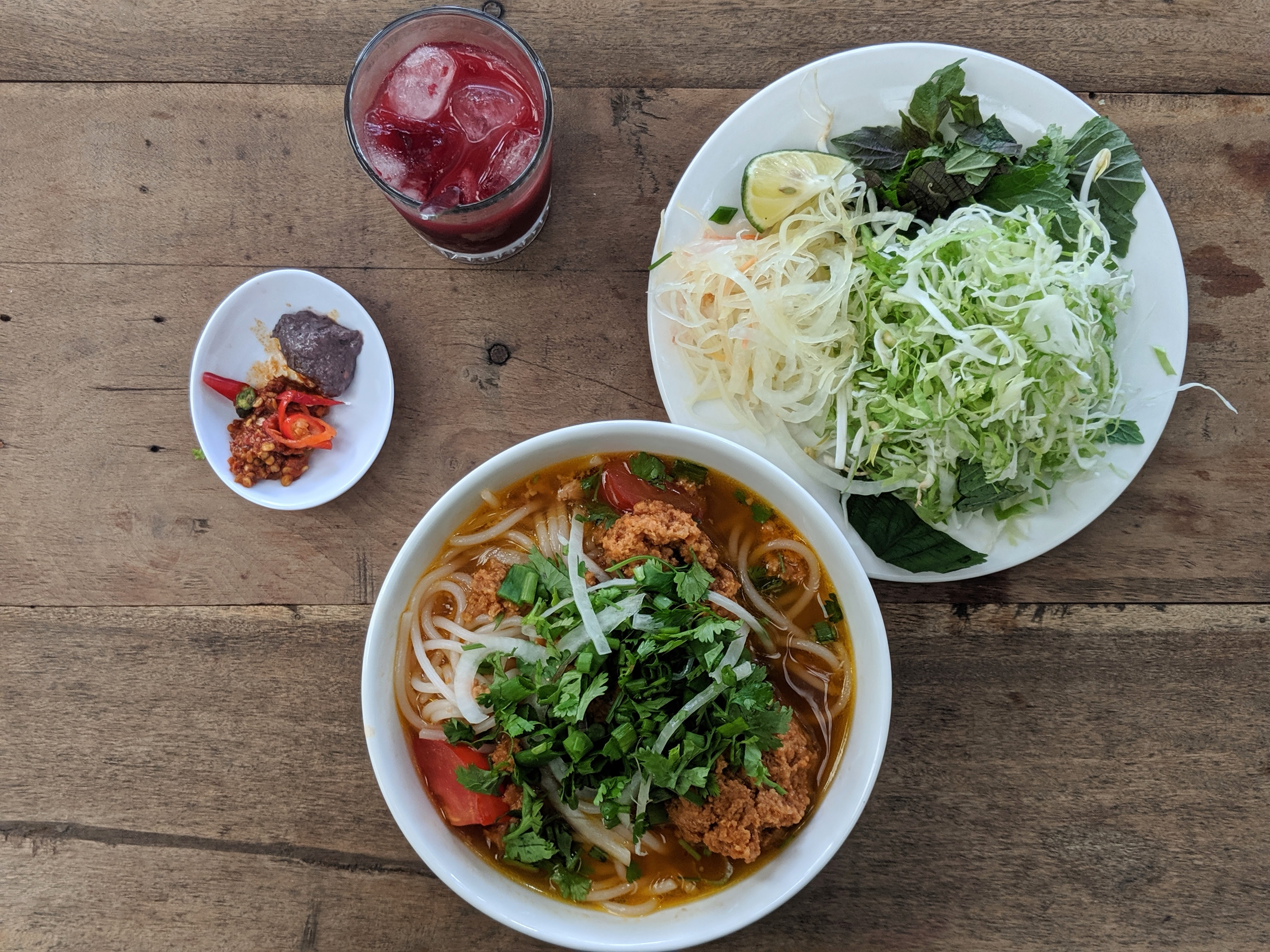
A bowl of bún riêu cua, served with fresh herbs and nước mắm

- Bún bò Huế – signature noodle soup from Huế, consisting of rice vermicelli in a beef broth with beef, lemongrass, and other ingredients
- Bún bung – soup made with tomato, Alocasia odora, green papaya, tamarind, green onions, and pork.
- Bún mắm – vermicelli noodle soup with a heavy shrimp paste broth
- Bún ốc – tomato and snail-based noodle soup topped with scallions
- Bún riêu – rice vermicelli soup with meat, tofu, tomatoes, and congealed boiled pig blood
  - Bún riêu cua – with crab
  - Bún riêu cá – with fish
  - Bún riêu ốc – with snails
- Bún chả - rice vermicelli with grilled fatty pork
- Bún chả cá – vermicelli soup with fried fishcake
- Bún sứa – noodles with jellyfish
- Bún thang – soup made with shredded chicken meat, shredded fried egg, shredded steam pork cake, and various vegetables
- Bún đậu mắm tôm – pressed vermicelli noodles with fried tofu served with shrimp paste
- Bún thịt nướng – cold noodle dish consisting of bún with grilled pork
- Bún bò Nam Bộ – stir-fried bún with beef, roasted peanut, herbs, and sauce

=== From mì ===
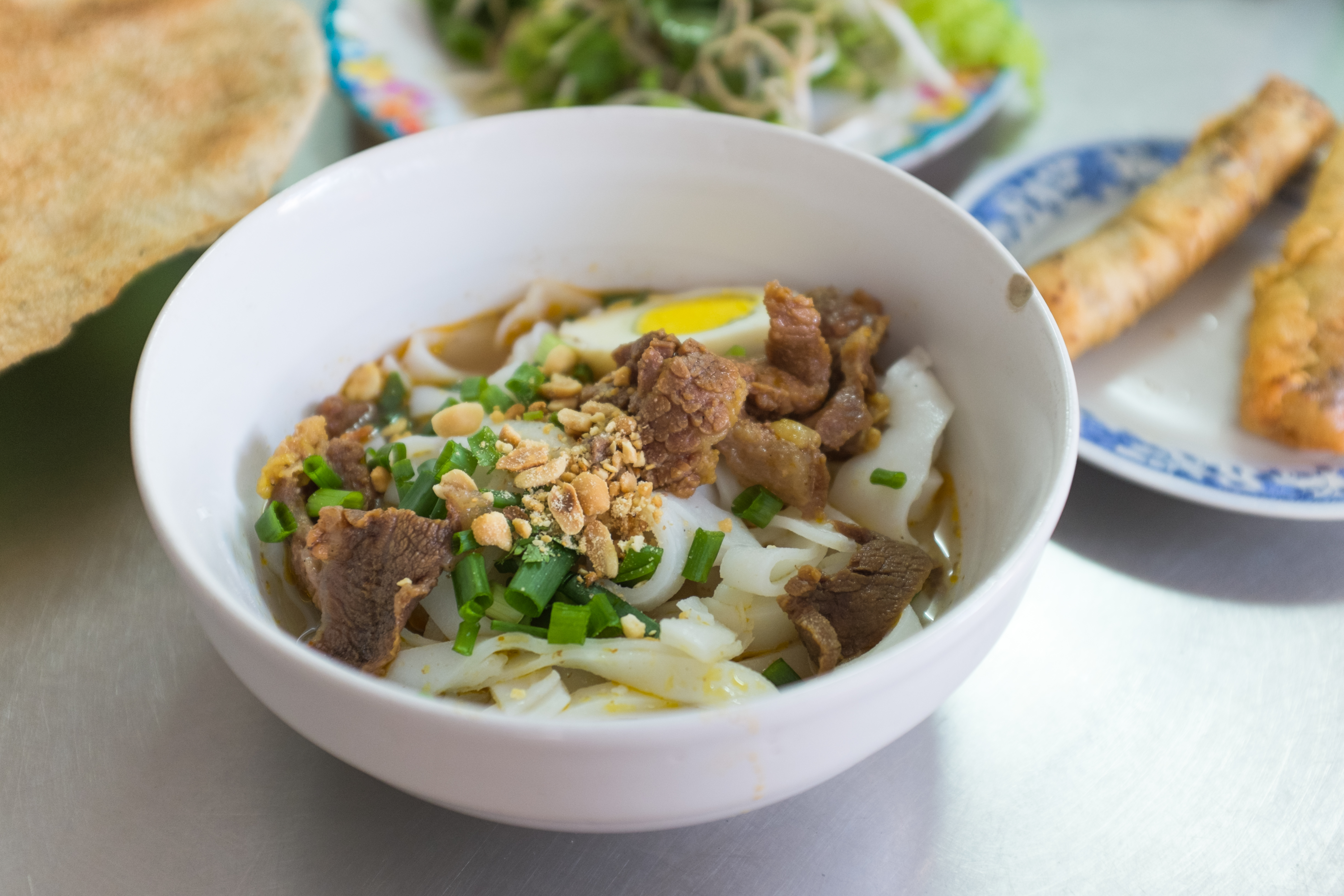
A bowl of mì Quảng with pork and egg

- Cao lầu – signature noodle dish from Hội An consisting of yellow wheat flour noodles in a small amount of broth, with various meats and herbs
- Mì Quảng – signature noodle dish from Quảng Nam consisting of yellow wheat flour noodles in a small amount of broth, with various meats and herbs

=== From bánh phở ===
- Phở – bánh phở in a broth made from beef and spices
  - Phở xào – stir-fried bánh phở

=== From hủ tiếu ===
- Hủ tiếu – breakfast dish mainly consisting of pork bone broth, noodles, and various types of toppings, including meat and other garnishes

=== From miến ===
- Miến lươn – noodle dish with eels

=== Rolls ===
- Gỏi cuốn – translated as either "summer roll" or "salad roll"; a cold dish consisting of various ingredients (including bún) rolled in moist dry rice paper

== See also ==
- List of noodles
- List of noodle dishes
- List of Vietnamese culinary specialities
- List of Vietnamese dishes
- List of Vietnamese ingredients
