= Soups in East Asian culture =

Asian soups
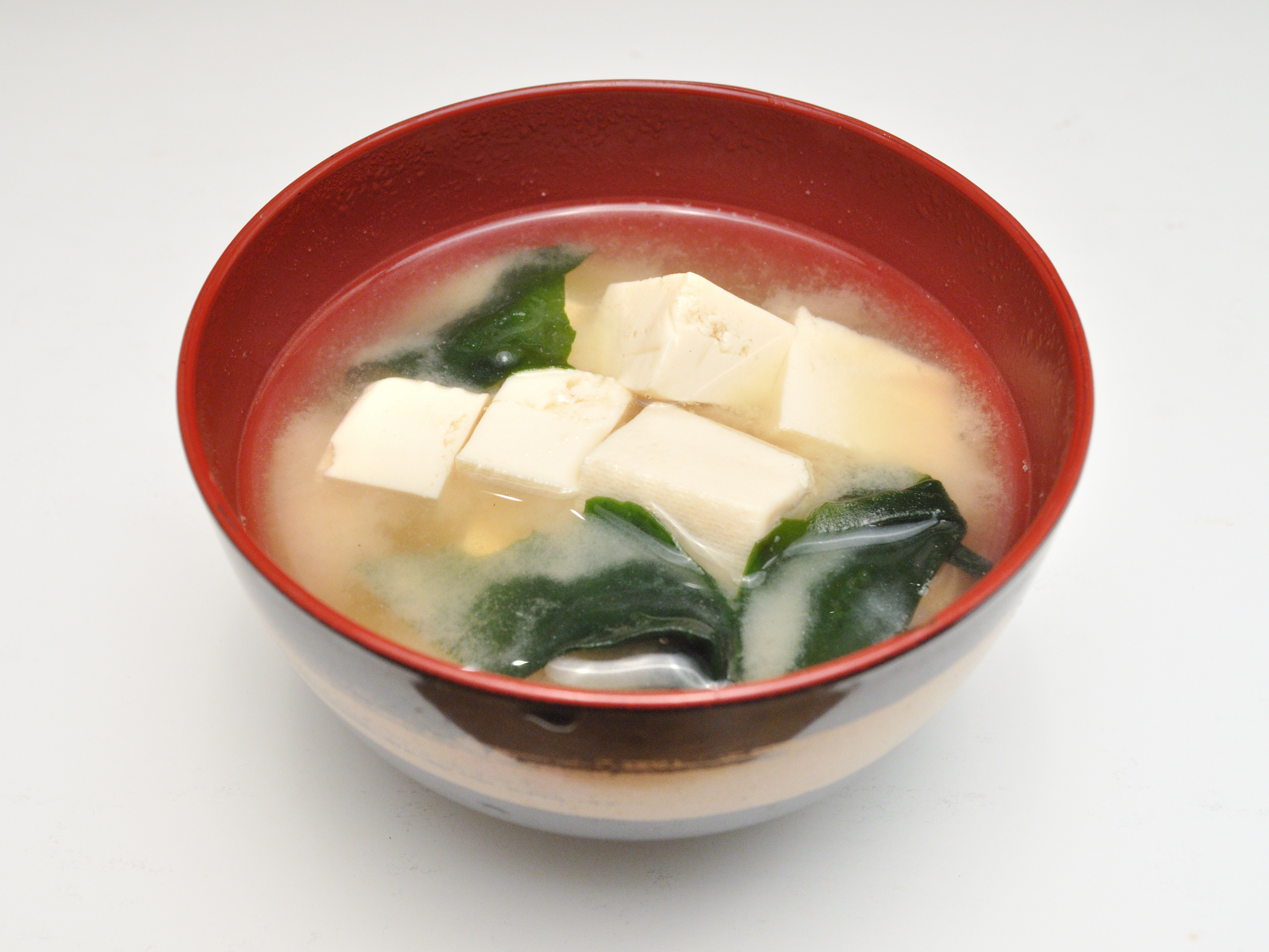
- A bowl of miso soup
- Type: Soup

Soups in East Asian culture are eaten as one of the many main dishes in a meal, or, in some cases served straight with little adornment. Particular attention is paid to the soups' stocks. In the case of some soups, the stock ingredients become part of the soup. They are usually based solely on broths and lacking in dairy products such as milk or cream. If thickened, the thickening usually consists of refined starches from corn or sweet potatoes.

Asian soups are generally categorized as either savoury or sweet. The quality of a savoury soup is determined mainly by its fragrance and umami or "xian" flavour, as well as, to a lesser extent, its mouthfeel. Sweet soups such as tong sui are enjoyed for their aroma, mouthfeel, and aftertaste. Many soups are eaten and drunk as much for their flavour as for their health benefits and touted for their purported revitalizing or invigorating effects.

In Chinese language, noodle soups are generally considered a noodle dish instead of a soup, as evidenced by the fact that they are called "soup noodles" (湯麵), with 'soup' being an adjective, in contrast with "dry noodles" (乾麵).

== Cultural significance ==
Many soups are consumed as a partial restorative and heavily linked with theories from traditional Chinese medicine. One such example is shark fin soup. There are many varieties of such tonic soups, ranging from pungent to light in flavour, and from savoury to sweet. Some soups of the same name may consist of different recipes due to regional preferences or differences. Such soups commonly contain one or more meats (typically pork or chicken), vegetables, and medicinal herbs.

== Traditional soup bases ==
=== Chinese ===
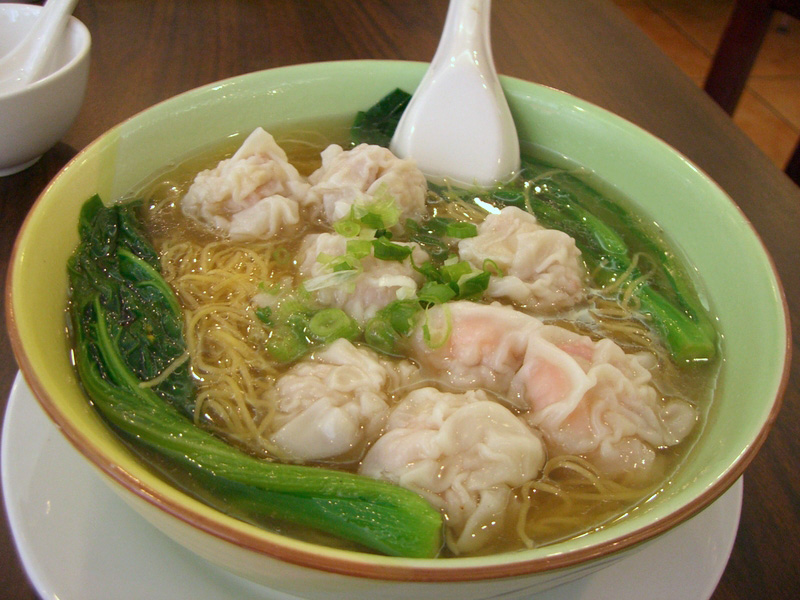
A bowl of wonton noodle soup

There are several basic traditional soup stocks in Chinese cuisine:

- Jītāng (鸡汤; 雞湯; Jītāng; 'chicken soup'): A basic chicken broth that is used in creating most Chinese soups. This broth is sometimes fortified with liquorice root, red dates, wolfberry, and other Chinese herbs.
- Shòuròutāng (瘦肉汤; 瘦肉湯; shòu ròu tāng; 'lean meat soup'): A lean pork broth, which is often used as the soup base for long-simmered Chinese soups (called 老火湯 in Cantonese). This soup base is often simmered over low heat for several hours with other roots, dried herbs, vegetables, and edible fungi like shiitake mushroom, white fungus, or wood ear. The Cantonese are especially known for their long-simmered Chinese soups, as they often pair ingredients under Chinese medicine concepts to enhance purported health benefits of the soup.
- Báitāng (白汤; 白湯; báitāng; 'white soup'): Made from lightly blanched pork bones that have been vigorously boiled for several hours, creating a white milky broth. This broth has a rich mouthfeel and deep flavor.
- Yútāng (鱼汤; 魚湯; yú tāng; 'fish soup'): Made from fish that have been fried and boiled for several hours, creating a white milky broth. This broth has a rich mouthfeel and sweet umami taste.
- Máotāng (毛汤; 毛湯; máo tāng; 'hair soup'): A broth made using the bones, meat offcuts, or skin of either pork, duck, or chicken. This broth is commonly used for simple flavouring of common dishes.
- Refined broth/stocks:
  - Shàngtāng (上汤; 上湯; shàng tāng; 'high soup'): A dark tan broth made from Jinhua ham, pork, and chicken that has been slowly simmered to finish. This rich and umami broth is used in the creation of many expensive soups such as shark fin soup or wonton soup.
  - Diàotāng (吊汤; 吊湯; diào tāng; 'hang soup'): A filtered white broth made through vigorous boiling of bones and chicken that has been clarified using pureed or finely minced chicken breast meat. Repeating the clarification and infusion process with more minced chicken produces a double-clarified broth (双吊汤; 雙吊湯; shuāng diào tāng; 'double hang soup' ). The white broth can also be clarified using egg white or blood but the taste will not be optimal. Used in the Sichuan dish kaishui baicai (开水白菜; 開水白菜; kāishuǐ báicài dà jiēmì; 'boiled cabbage').

Ingredients used in making Chinese stocks can be recooked again to produce a thinner broth with less intense flavours, known as ertang (二汤; 二湯; èr tāng; 'second soup').

=== Japanese ===
Collectively known as dashi, most Japanese soup bases are flavoured primarily with kombu (kelp) and shavings from dried skipjack tuna (katsuobushi). They are soaked or simmered to release the umami flavours of the shavings, and the resulting broth is strained. Mirin is occasionally added to the broth to further enhance the taste of the broth.

- Kombu: Kelp (kombu) is soaked in lukewarm water or simmered to yield a light broth.
- Niboshi: made by soaking or boiling dried sardines (niboshi) in water. The heads and entrails are usually pinched off prior to soaking, to prevent bitterness.
- Shiitake dashi: made by soaking dried shiitake mushrooms in water.

=== Korean ===
Korean broth is collectively known as yuksu(K: 육수 T: 肉水). Although the literal definition is meaty water, yuksu can be used to include broth made by vegetable equivalent. Each kinds of broth will be used for diverse range of Korean soup.

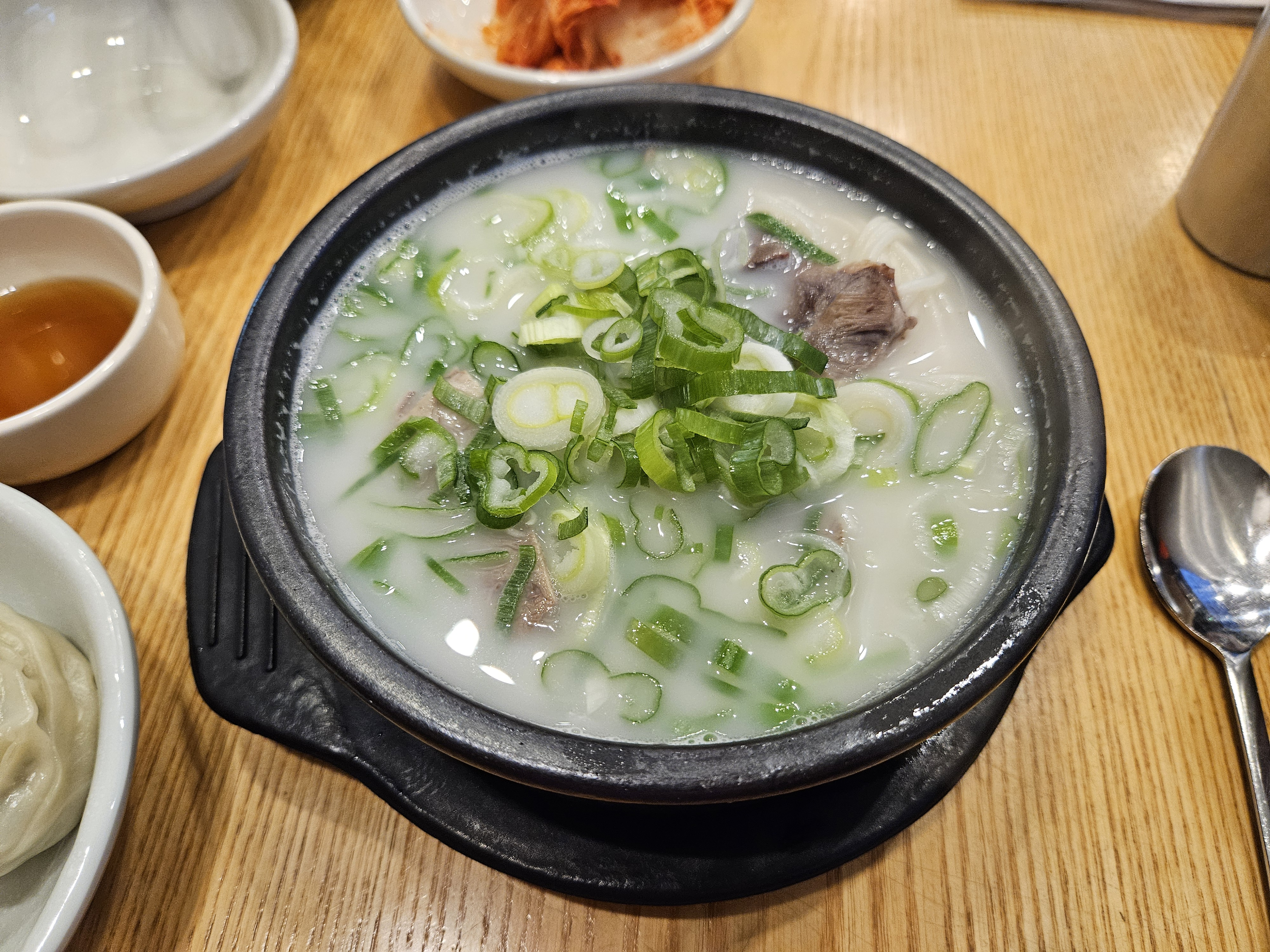
A bowl of seolleongtang

- Myeolchi Yuksu (멸치 육수) is a clear broth made from boiling dried Korean anchovies. Dashima (kelp) could be boiled together to enhance its flavour. It is most common type of broth that can be used for most of the simple Korean soup and noodle dishes.
- Gogi Yuksu (고기 육수)means a clear broth from boiling meat, which could be beef, chicken, or pork. It is often used to replace the basic Myeolchi Yuksu to give more flavour.
- Sagol Yuksu (사골 육수) is a milky broth made from boiling bones for a long period of time. It is often used to make hearthy and meaty Korean soup such as gamja tang (감자탕).
- Kimichi Yuksu (김치 육수) is a clear broth from Korean traditional kimchi, not boiled. Most of those kimchi broth used are those with less pepper powder. The typical example is from sliced Chinese radish called dongchimi (동치미), which is often used to make cold noodle dishes.

=== Indonesian ===
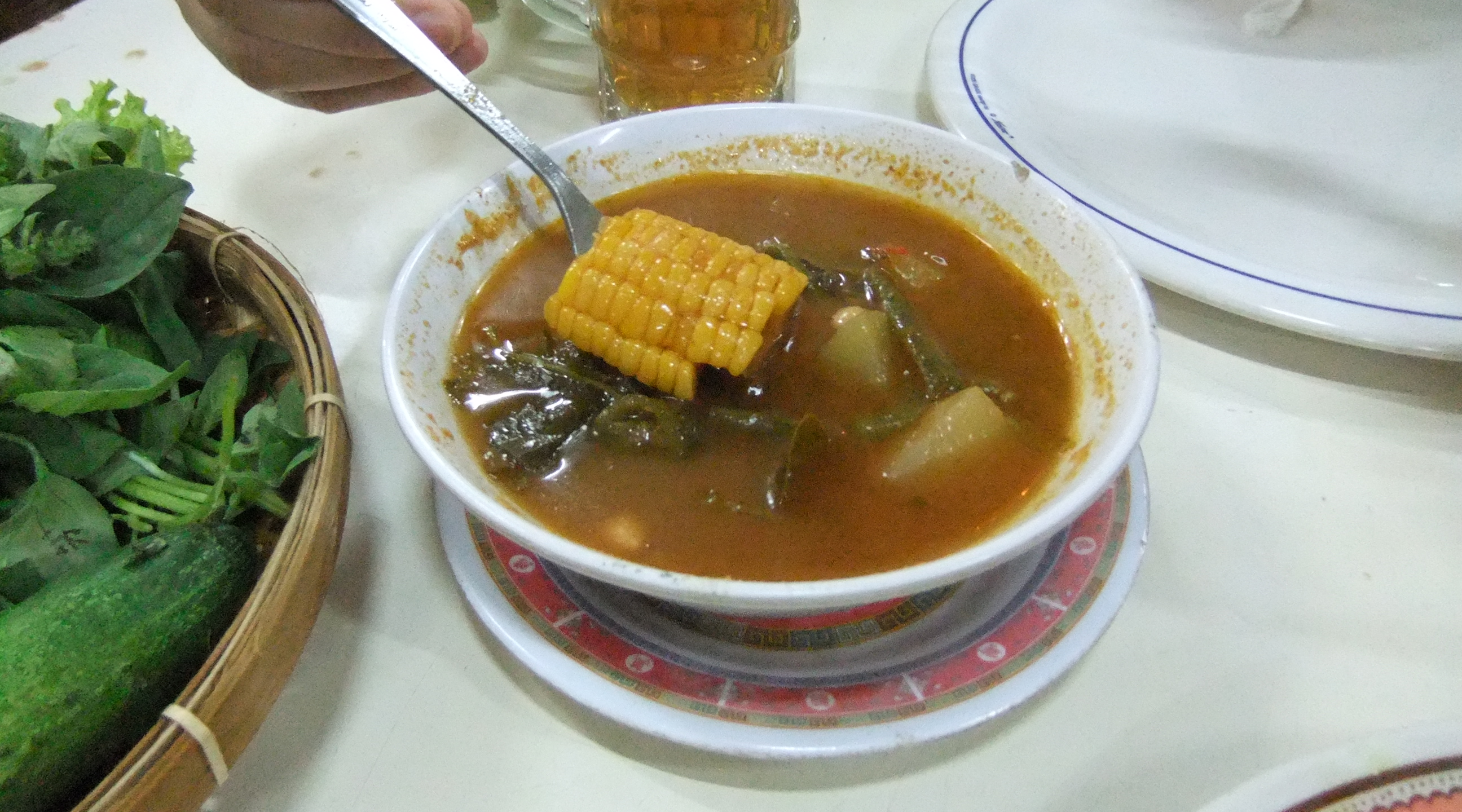
A bowl of sayur asem with tamarind-based soup

In Indonesian cuisine, there are many traditional soup bases to create kuah (soup or stock), acquired from vegetables, spices, meat or bones.

- Santan is a rich and creamy thin white soup made from coconut milk. It is made by squeezing grated coconut flesh to acquire its oily juice. Thick coconut milk is usually used to make thicker sauce, while thin coconut milk are used to create soup. Sometimes turmeric is added to create golden-yellowish colour. Example of Indonesian traditional soups that employ coconut milk as a soup base are sayur lodeh and several variants of sotos.
- Kuah asam is a light, fresh and sour thin soup made from asam jawa (tamarind) juice. Example of soup employing tamarind is sayur asem, vegetables stew in tamarind soup.
- Kuah cuka, another variant of sour-tasting soup that simply using vinegar instead of tamarind. Usually employed to create seafood soups.
- Sayur bening literary means "clear soup", it is lightly seasoned only with small amount of garlic, shallot, and temu kunci. Example of clear vegetable soup is sayur bayam (spinach soup) and sayur oyong (okra soup).
- Kaldu in Indonesian cuisine refer to broth or stock acquired from boiling meat and/or bones. The broth might be acquired from chicken, beef and mutton. Example of Indonesian soup that employ kaldu (meat broth) is sop buntut and bakso (meatball noodle soup).

== Soups ==
The soup bases are used to cook a large variety of soups

=== American Chinese cuisine ===
In American-Chinese restaurants some of the most popular soups are: egg drop soup, hot and sour soup, wonton soup, and chicken with corn soup.

=== Korean ===
- Yukgaejang (육개장) is a spicy red soup made with beef strips, red pepper, and assorted vegetables (usually green and white onions, bean sprouts, among others); many variations include egg and rice or cellophane noodles dropped into the soup, and sometimes shrimp and other pieces of seafood. Of the spicy Korean soups, 육개장 is very popular among both Koreans and non-Koreans.
- Miyeok guk (미역국) is a soup made from boiled sliced beef and miyeok (popularized as wakame in Japanese). It is believed to be good for the blood vessels and heart. Koreans traditionally eat this for birthday celebrations, or when a woman gives birth to a child.
- Tteok guk (떡국) is a soup made with slices of rice cake. The base is usually beef or anchovy (멸치) stock along with the rice cake slices, and most variations also have sliced green onions, eggs dropped into the soup, and are usually served with strips or pieces of laver (김; many variations will be baked or fried and salted/seasoned). 떡국 is traditionally served on the lunar New Year, but is a favourite during the colder months.
- Doenjang jjigae (된장 찌개) is a bean paste soup base. Usually served with at least tofu and green onions, many variations include other ingredients (including various meats or fishes but usually not egg, potatoes, and other vegetables). Miso is a less-concentrated, much simpler version of 된장.
- Sundubu jjigae (순두부 찌개) is a spicy red stew (not so much a soup) very similar in ingredients and preparation to 육개장, but has dropped tofu (i.e. not the firm kind, but uncurdled tofu, called sundubu in Korean) as a primary ingredient in addition to everything else, and will tend to favour seafood ingredients more heavily than meats. Usually served scalding hot and with the balance in favour of ingredients over fluid, 순두부 찌개 is also different from 육개장 in that the egg yolk is often placed in the soup intact (as opposed to the usual dropped egg technique in which the egg white and the egg yolk are broken up within the soup and thus cook within the soup in pieces, not as a single piece).

=== Indonesian ===
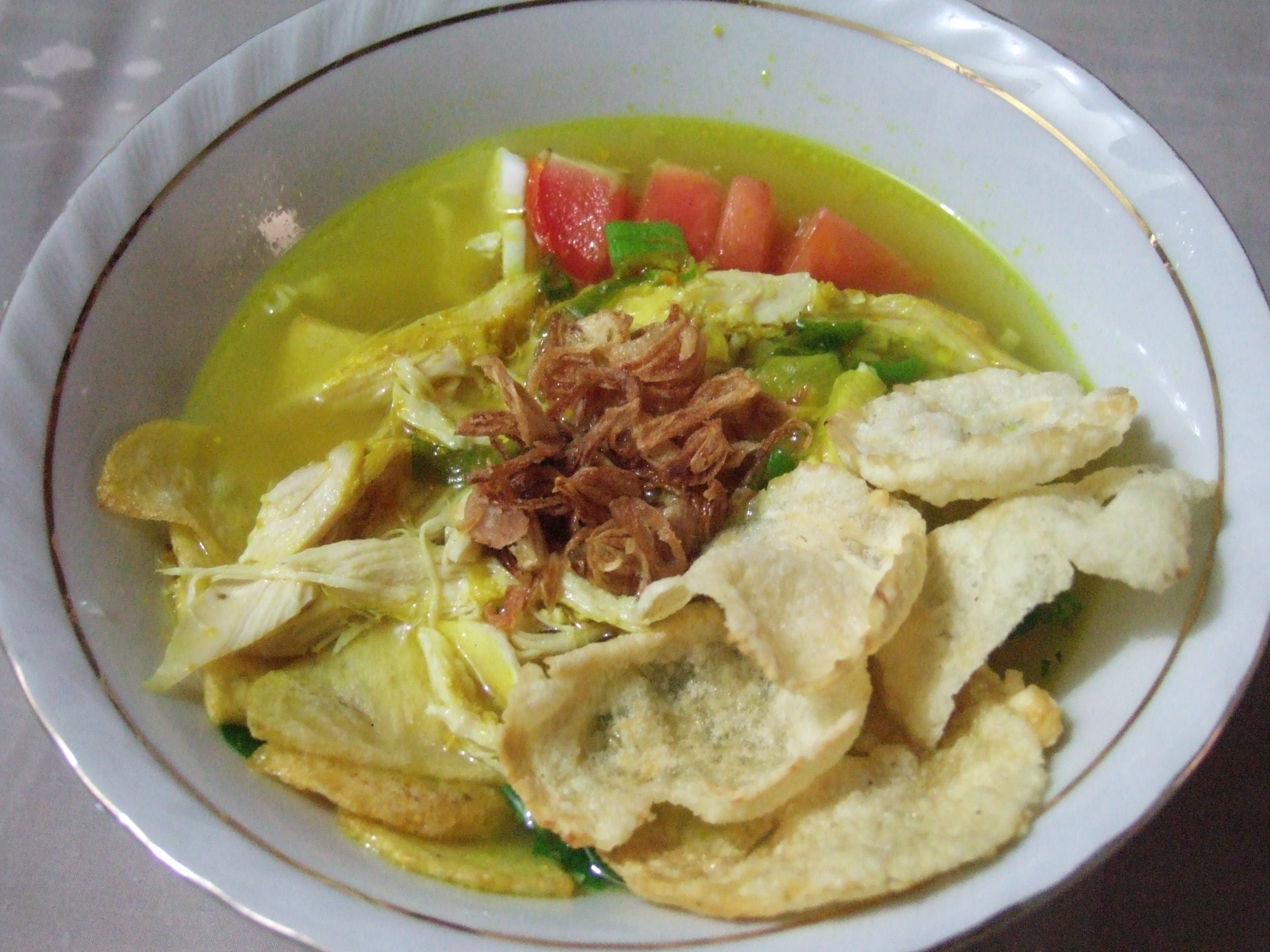
Soto ayam, Indonesian counterpart of chicken soup.

Indonesian soups are known to be flavoursome with generous amount of bumbu spice mixture. Indonesian cuisine has a diverse variety of soups. Some Indonesian soups may be served as a separate whole meal, while others are lighter.

Generally Indonesian soups and stews are grouped into three major groups with numbers of variants in between.

1. Soto refer to variety of Indonesian traditionally spiced meat soups, either in clear broth or in rich coconut milk-base soup, example includes soto ayam.
2. Sayur refer to traditional vegetables stews, such as sayur asem.
3. Sop or sup usually refer to soups derived from western influences, such as sop buntut.

=== Nepalese ===
- Kwāti is a mixed soup of nine types of sprouted beans—black gram, green gram, chickpea, field bean, soybean, field pea, garden pea, cowpea and rice bean. It is eaten as the special dish on the full moon day of August.

=== Vietnamese ===
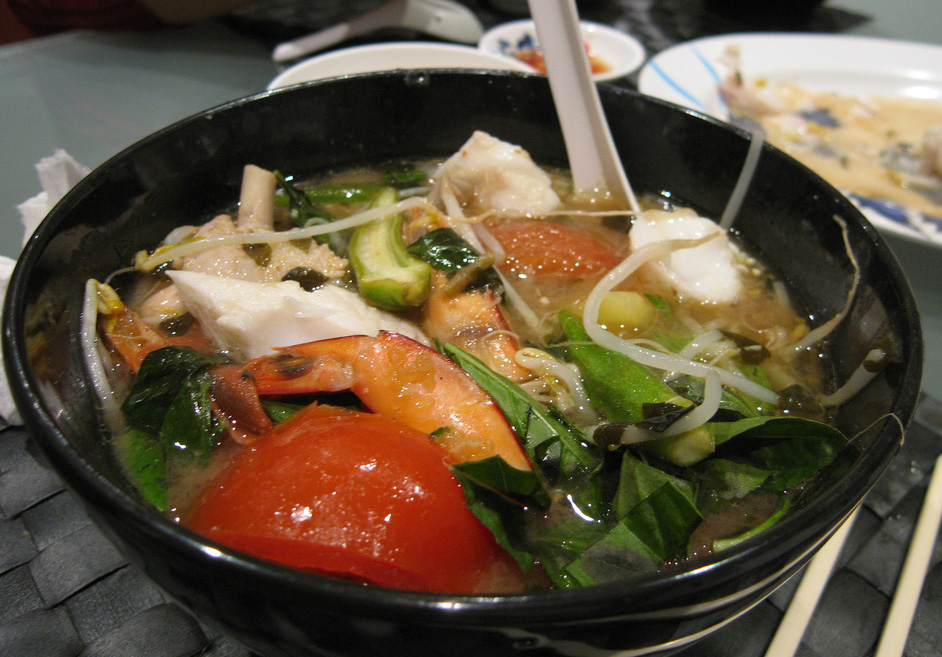
A bowl of canh chua

Vietnamese cuisine features two basic categories of soup: noodle soups and broths (Vietnamese: canh).

Noodle soups are enjoyed for both breakfast and dinner. Popular noodle soups include phở, rice vermicelli (bún bò Huế, bún mọc, bún ốc, Bún riêu cua, bún suông, etc.), mì (mì Quảng in Quảng Nam Province), bánh canh, bánh đa cua (in Hai Phong province), nui, and hủ tiếu.

Broths are thin and generally made from vegetables and spices. They are typically eaten over steamed rice in ordinary lunches and dinners. Common broths include canh chua rau đay and canh chua cá lóc.

Hot pot (lẩu) is a popular traditional soup in Vietnam. Mushroom hot pot was popularized by the Ashima Restaurant chain in Vietnam.

A thick, sweet, porridge-like soup called chè is eaten as a snack.

=== Medicinal ===
The most commonly used herbs, which are believed to be mildly invigorating, restorative, or immune-stimulating in nature, include wild yam (Dioscorea polystachya), Astragalus membranaceus, Codonopsis pilosula, Angelica sinensis, wolfberry, and jujube. Ginseng and lingzhi are used less frequently, due to their comparatively higher price.

Many specific recipes for tonic soups using other herbs exist. Some of the best-known are:

- Sijunzi tang (T: 四君子湯, literally "four nobles soup"); contains Panax ginseng (人參) Atractylodes macrocephala (白朮), Fu Ling (茯苓), and Glycyrrhiza uralensis (甘草)
- Siwu tang (T: 四物湯, S: 四物汤; literally "four substances soup"); contains Angelica sinensis (T: 當歸, S:当归), Paeonia lactiflora (T: 芍藥, S: 芍药), Ligusticum wallichii (川芎), and Rehmannia glutinosa (T: 地黃, S: 地黄)
- Sishen tang (T: 四神湯, S: 四神汤; literally "four-divinity soup"): Usually cooked with slivered pork stomach and known as "Sishen zhudu tang" (T: 四神豬肚湯, S: 四神猪肚汤; literally "four-divinity pig stomach soup"); contains Dioscorea polystachya (淮山/山藥), Lotus seed (Nelumbo nucifera)(蓮子), Fu Ling (茯苓), and Euryale ferox seeds (芡實)
- Liuwei tang (T: 六味湯, S: 六味汤; literally "six-taste soup"): A sweet soup used for clearing "heat". Ingredients may include:
  - Guangdong Qingbuliang (廣東清補凉): A Cantonese restorative which contains Dioscorea polystachya (淮山/山藥), Lilium lancifolium bulb (百合) Polygonatum odoratum (玉竹), Lotus seed (Nelumbo nucifera)(蓮子), Euryale ferox seeds (芡實), and either one of Dimocarpus longan fruit (龍眼) or Ziziphus zizyphus(紅棗)
  - Houke Zhizhang (喉科指掌:卷二): Schizonepeta (荊芥), Saposhnikovia divaricata (T: 防風, S: 防风), Chinese bellflower (桔梗), Glycyrrhiza uralensis (甘草), stiff silkworm (T: 僵蠶, S: 僵蚕), and mentha (薄荷),
  - Yupingfeng formulation derivative (玉屏风散加味): Astragalus membranaceus (T: 黃芪, S: 黄芪), Atractylodes macrocephala (T: 白朮, S: 白术), Saposhnikovia divaricata (T: 防風, S: 防风), honeysuckle flower (T: 銀花, S: 银花), Dryopteris crassirhizoma (T: 貫眾, S: 贯众), and dried mandarin orange skin (T: 陳皮, 陈皮)
  - Gac (T: 木鱉子, S:木鳖子), Terminalia chebula fruits (T: 訶子, S: 诃子), Glycyrrhiza uralensis (甘草), cardamom (白豆蔻), and lightly cooked rice (微炒大米)
- Bazhen tang (T: 八珍湯, S: 八珍汤; literally "eight-rarity/treasure soup"): When cooked with beaten egg, it is called "Bazhen danhua tang" (T: 八珍蛋花湯, S: 八珍蛋花汤; literally "eight treasure egg flower soup"). This formulation is the combination of Sijunzi tang (四君子湯) and Siwu tang (四物湯).
- Shiquan tang (T: 十全湯, S: 十全汤; literally "ten-complete soup", or more idiomatically "complete/wholesome soup"): More often known by its full name "Shiquen dabu tang" (T: 十全大補湯, S: 十全大补汤; literally "complete/wholesome great restorative soup"). This formulation is an extension of Bazhen tang (八珍湯) with the addition of Cinnamomum aromaticum (肉桂) and Astragalus propinquus (黃芪)

== Types ==
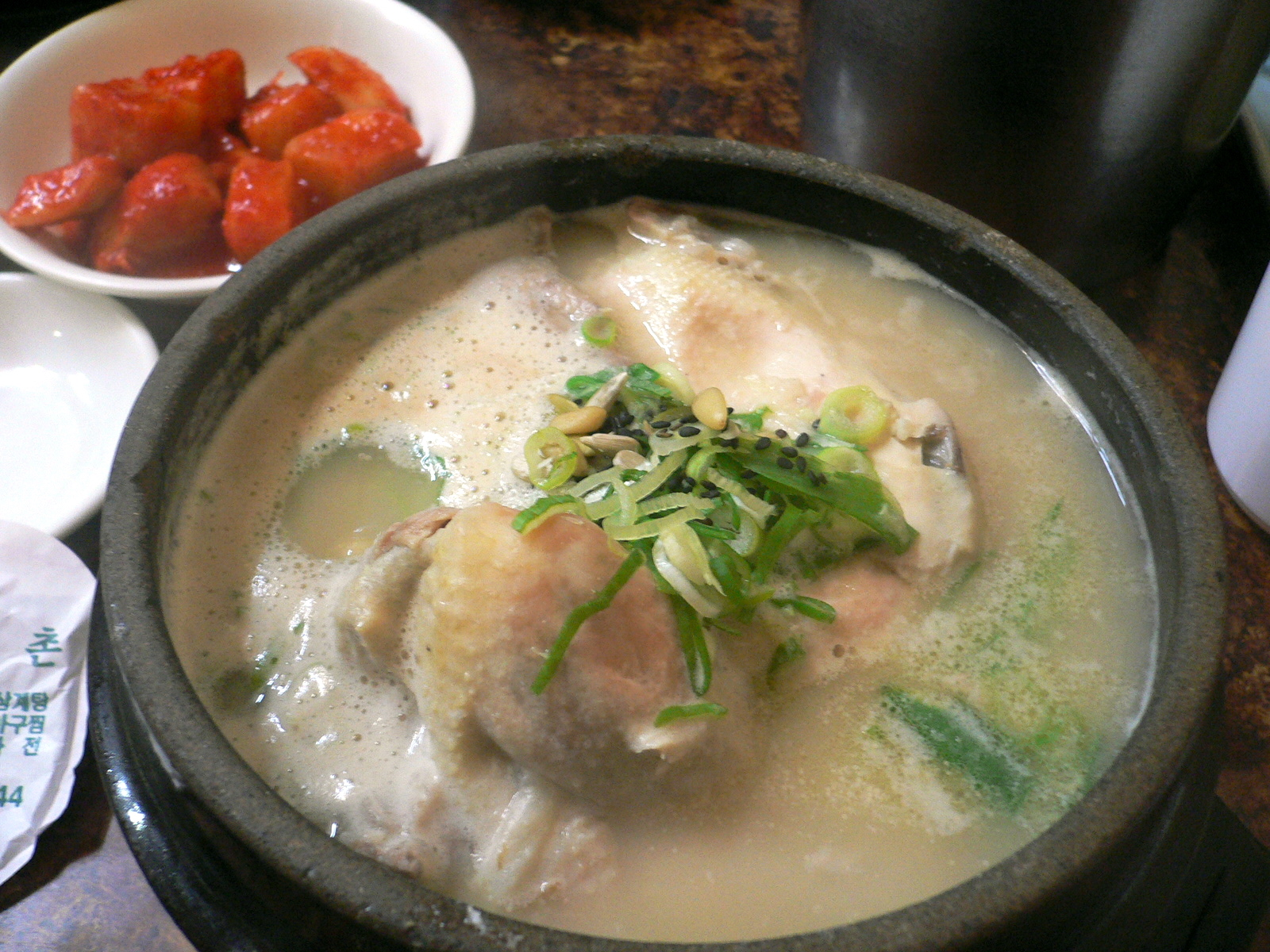
A pot of samgyetang (Korean chicken ginseng soup)

- Egg drop soup is a light Chinese soup.
- Ginseng soup is very popular in China and Korea; samgyetang (ginseng-stuffed chicken in broth) is considered a Korean national dish.
- Steamboat is a communal soup of meat, seafood, and vegetables dipped and cooked in hot broth on the tabletop.
- Miso soup is a light broth containing miso. It is usually served at breakfast in Japan and sometimes includes tofu, mushrooms, seaweed, or green onions.
- Shark fin soup is a Chinese soup made with shark's fin, crab meat and egg that is often served in banquets.
- Dried tofu skin soup With Shiitake mushrooms and dried oysters. Base of soup from pork ribs and/or chicken broth.
- Soto is a traditional Indonesian soup mainly composed of broth, meat and vegetables with spices. Some soto recipes uses clear broth, while some might uses coconut milk-based soup.

The Asian soup noodle is a large portion of long noodles served in a bowl of broth. In comparison, western noodle soup is more of a soup with small noodle pieces. The former dish is dominated by the carbohydrate while the latter dish is dominated by the soup liquid.

- Bakso is an Indonesian meatball noodle soup. The beef meatballs are served with rice vermicelli, yellow wheat noodle and vegetables in beef broth.
- Phở is a Vietnamese staple noodle soup. Its broth is made from boiling beef bones, ginger, and sweet spices (star anise, cinnamon, and cloves) over many hours.
- Ramen is a Japanese noodle soup that comes in several varieties.
- Thukpa is Tibetan noodle soup, that is more or less the staple (along with butter tea and tsampa).
- Udon soup has thick, soft noodles in a light broth. There are many varieties with different noodles and toppings.

== See also ==
- Coconut soup
- Noodle soup
- Rice congee, a thick soup made from boiled rice
- Jjigae, a category of Korean stews
- Jeongol, another form of Korean stew
- List of Chinese soups
- List of soups
- Medicinal mushrooms
