= Cao lầu =

Vietnamese noodle dish

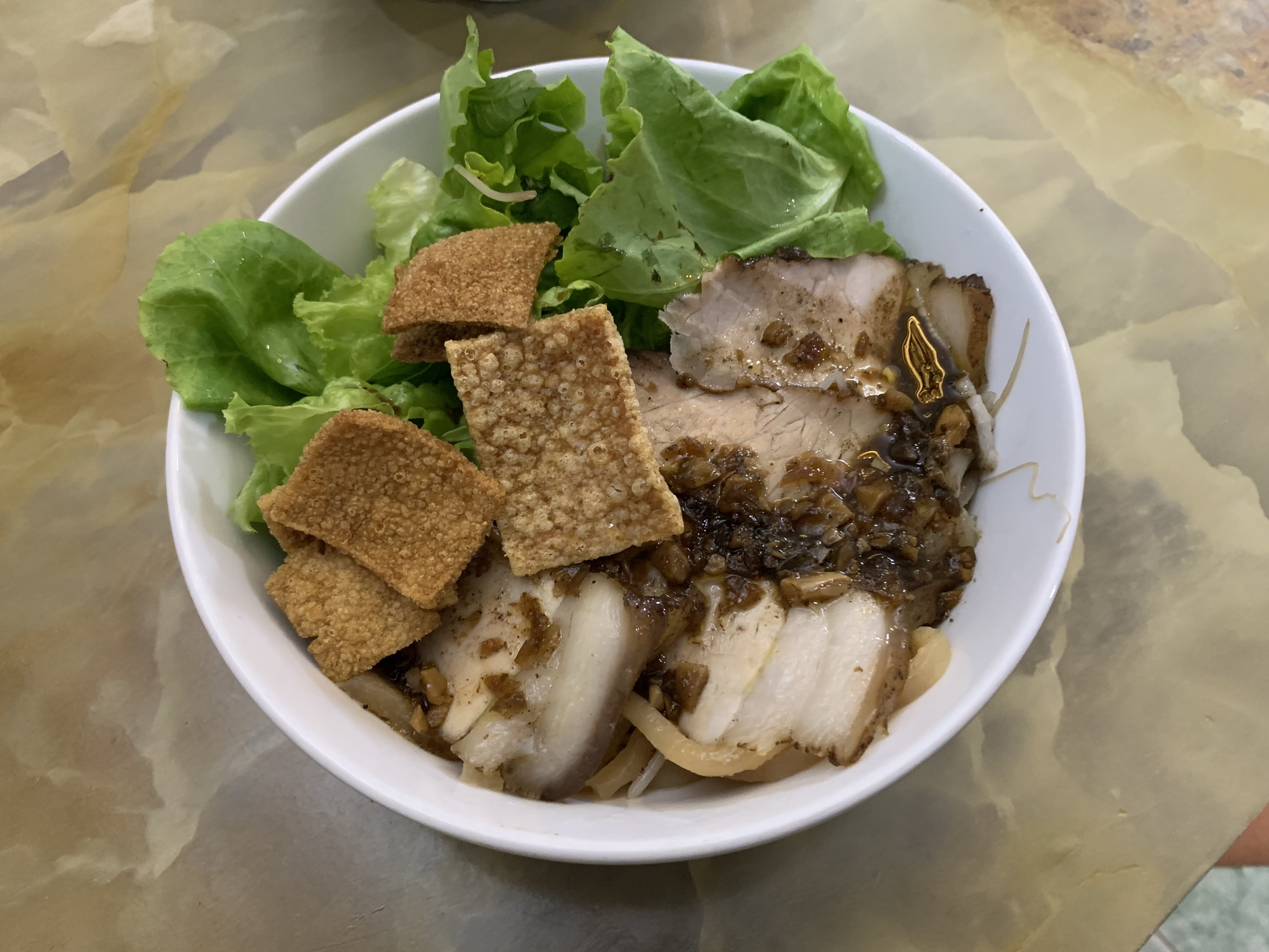
- A bowl of cao lầu served in Hội An
- Type: Noodle
- Place of origin: Vietnam
- Region or state: Hội An
- Main ingredients: Rice noodles, pork, and greens

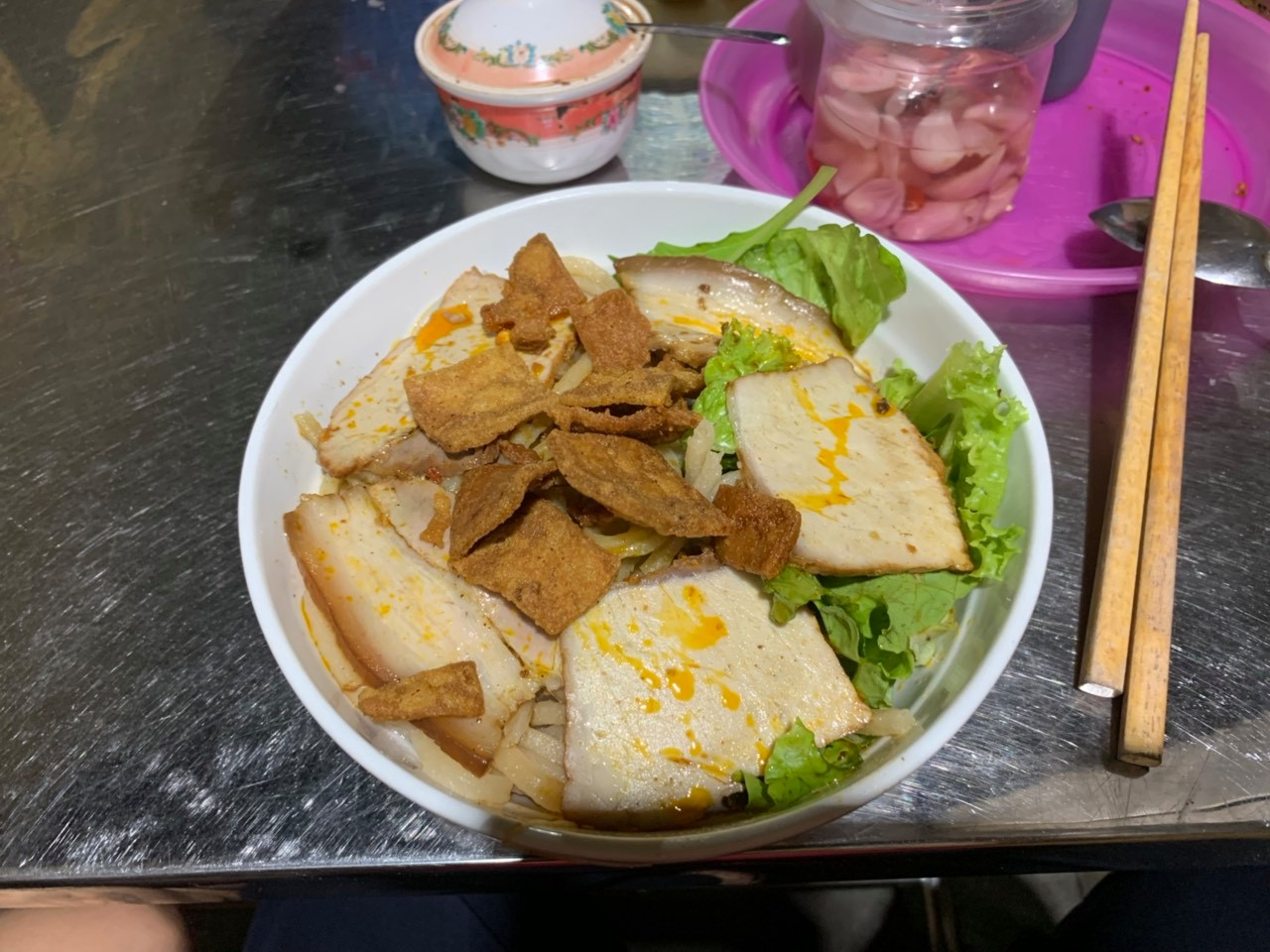
A bowl of cao lầu

Cao lầu is a regional Vietnamese noodle dish, from the city of Hội An, in the central Vietnamese municipality of Da Nang. It typically consists of pork and greens on a bed of rice noodles made from rice which has been soaked in lye water, giving them a characteristic texture and colour that sets the dish apart from other Vietnamese noodle dishes, including others from the same region, such as mì Quảng.

== Ingredients ==
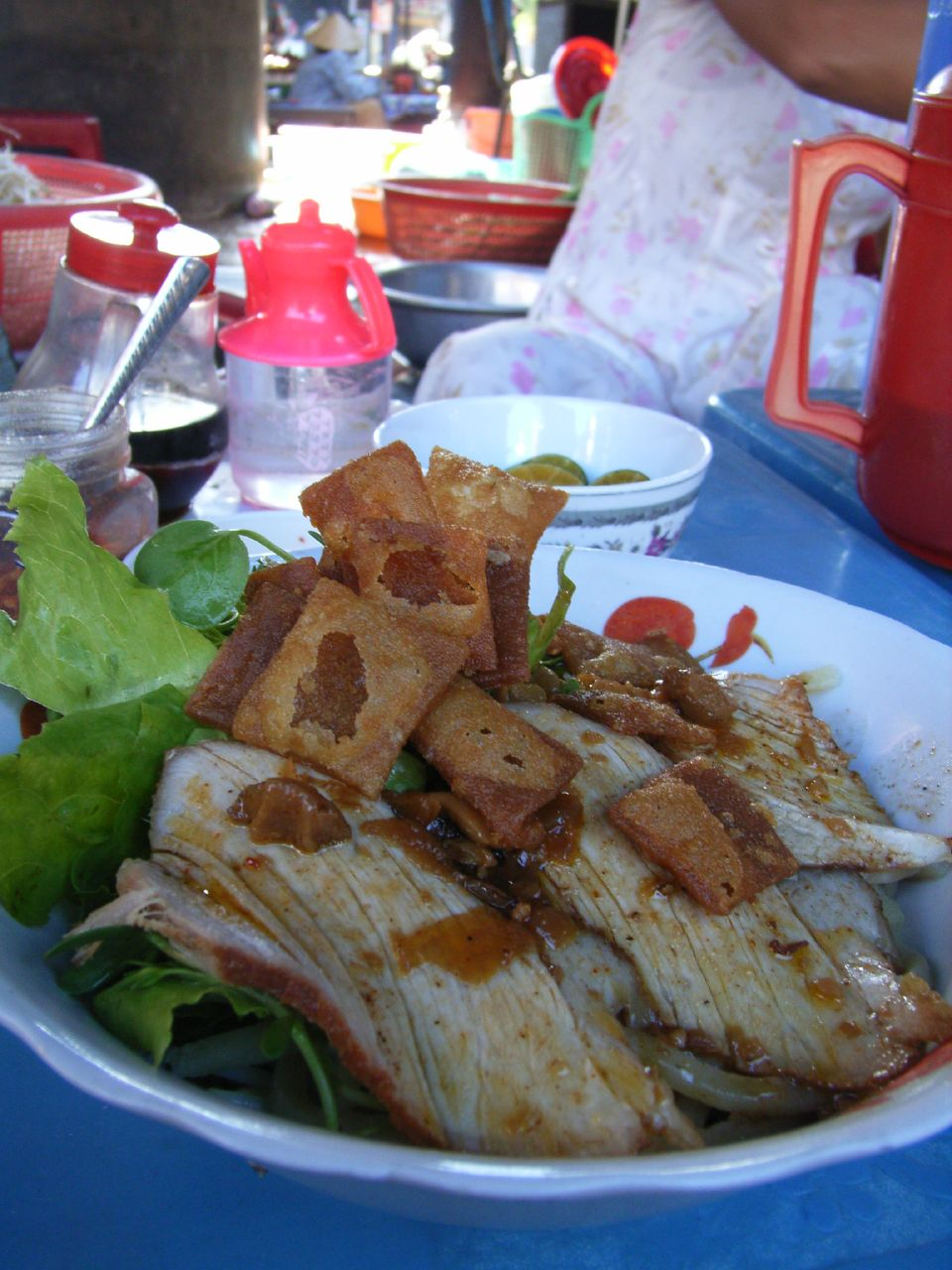
A bowl of Cao lầu with fried pork and meat

The main ingredients of cao lầu are rice noodles, meat, greens, bean sprouts, and herbs, most commonly served with a small amount of broth. The meat used is typically pork, either shredded or sliced char siu-style pork (xá xíu), but shrimp (tôm) can also be used.

The rice noodles used in cao lầu are made from rice soaked in lye water, which gives them a chewy, springy texture and a grayish-brown or yellowish colour. Local legend suggests that the lye should be made by leaching the ashes of certain plants from the nearby Cham Islands, and that the water used in soaking the rice and boiling the noodles should be taken from the ancient Bá Lễ well in Hội An; for this reason, the legend states, cao lầu is rarely found outside the vicinity of Hội An. After soaking in the lye water, the rice is processed to make noodles at least 10 cm long and 0.5 cm wide, which are soaked in water for several hours, washed and boiled to taste. Some of the raw noodles are also cut into squares and deep-fried until crispy; these are used to top the dish when serving.

The meat used in cao lầu is typically pork which is marinated in five-spice powder, sugar, salt, pepper, crushed garlic, and soy sauce, to give a taste similar to char siu pork. Pork bones are also boiled to make the broth, along with onions or shallots.

Cao lầu is served with lettuce, bean sprouts and a number of fresh herbs (rau) such as mint, chives, perilla (rau tía tô), lemon basil (rau húng quế), Vietnamese coriander (rau răm), cilantro (ngò or rau mùi), and water mint (rau húng lủi). A variety of other herbs may also be used in cao lầu, including mustard greens (rau cải), chrysanthemum greens (tan ô), common knotgrass (rau đắng), and heartleaf (rau giấp cá).

== Serving ==
A bowl of cao lầu is assembled by placing the noodles on a bed of fresh greens, bean sprouts and herbs. The marinated char siu pork is fried in a pan or wok until tender, made to cool, cut into thin slices (or, alternately, shredded), and placed on the noodles. Then a small amount of broth (enough to wet the noodles) is poured over the contents of the bowl. Finally, the bowl is topped with the crispy squares and herbs, and served with lime and chili to taste. The dish is served at room temperature, and the contents of the bowl are mixed together before eating.

== See also ==
- Vietnamese noodles
