= Mì =

Yellow wheat noodles

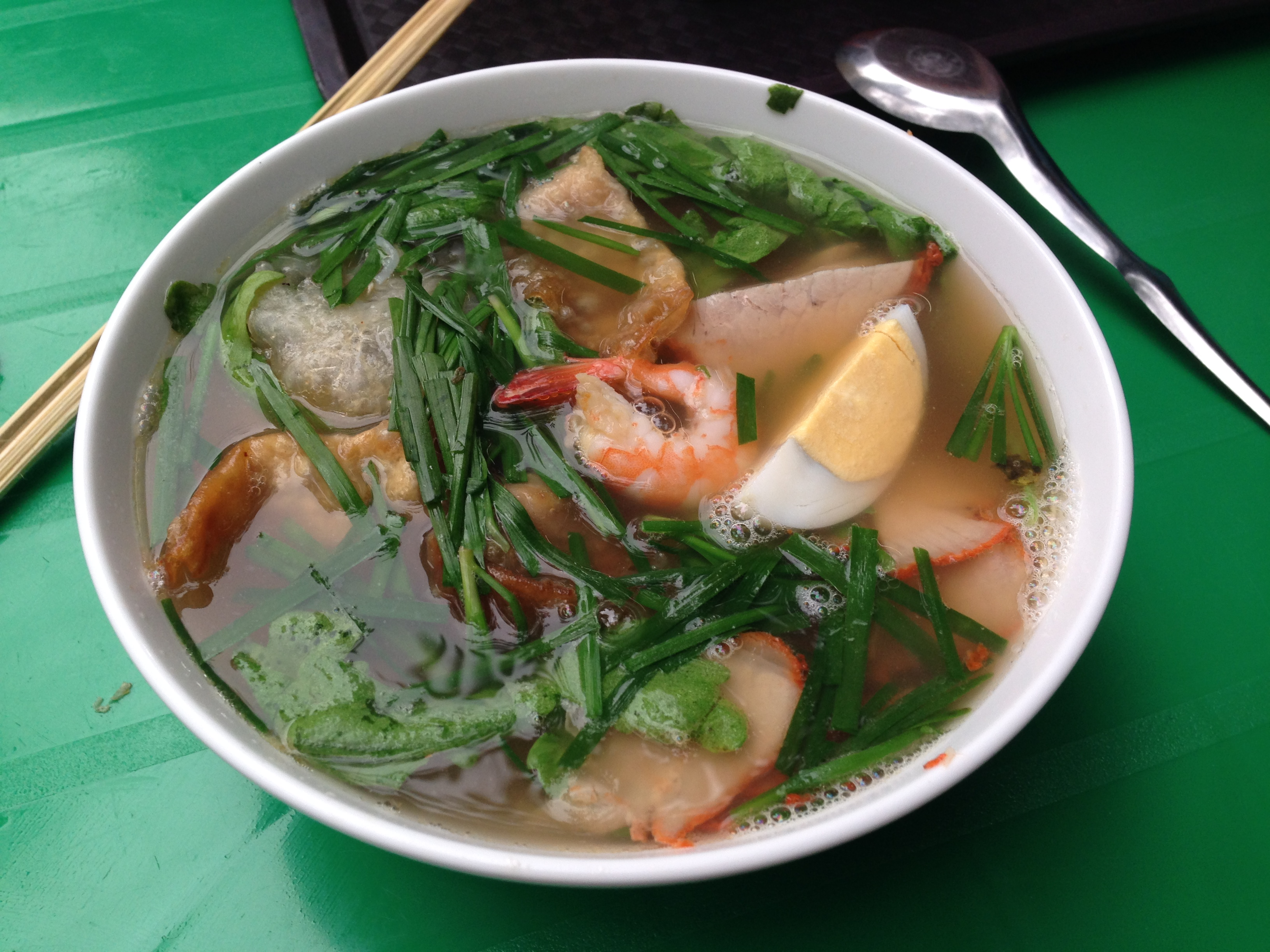
A bowl of mì vằn thắn in Hanoi

Mì (mỳ) or mi is a Vietnamese term for noodles. It can both refer to wheat or rice noodles. The Vietnamese version of wonton noodles is mì hoành thánh. The noodles can be either thin or wide and are commonly used in súp mì (noodle soup) and mì khô (dry noodles).

== Types ==
Mì or noodle soup can be served with a pork-based broth with the noodles and other ingredients together or with the soup served separately. Common ingredients are noodles, pork broth, ground pork, chives and a choice of meats or toppings. They can be served with spicy pickled green papaya (đu đủ chua ngọt) on the side. Condiments may include soy sauce, sa tế, pickled jalapenos, and red or white vinegar.

- Mì hoành thánh (mì vằn thắn) – wonton noodle soup
- Mì sủi (xủi) cảo – dumpling noodle soup
- Mì thập cẩm – combination noodle soup with barbecue pork (xá xíu/char siu), chicken, shrimp, squid
- Mì vịt quay – Cantonese-style roast duck noodle soup
- Mì vịt tiềm – seared and braised duck leg noodle soup with herbs, soy sauce, and bok choy
- Mì hải sản – seafood noodle soup
- Mì sa tế bò – beef sate noodle soup
- Mì bò viên – beef meatball noodle soup
- Mì cá viên – fishball noodle soup
- Mì Quảng – Typical dishes of Quảng Nam province

== See also ==
- List of soups
- List of Vietnamese culinary specialities
- List of Vietnamese dishes
- Ramen
- Vietnamese cuisine
- Vietnamese noodles
