= 白湯 =

白湯 may refer to:

- Baitang (soup) (白汤; 白湯; báitāng; 'white soup'), a soup in Chinese cuisine
- Paitan (白湯; 'white soup'), a soup base in Japanese cuisine commonly used in ramen

== See also ==
- White soup (disambiguation)
