= Wonton noodles =

Cantonese noodle dish

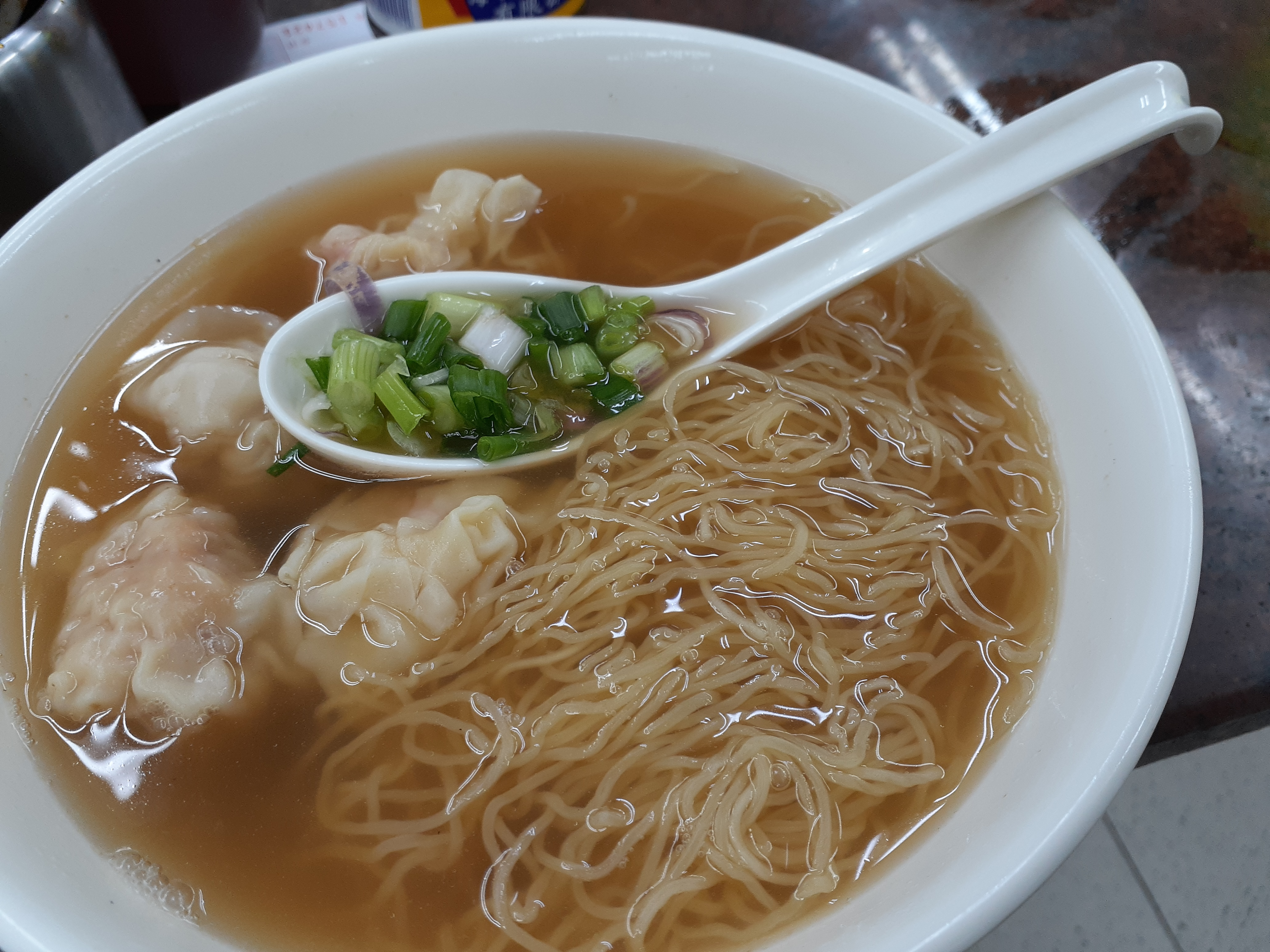
- Wonton noodle soup in Hong Kong
- Type: Noodles
- Course: Main course
- Place of origin: China
- Region or state: Guangdong, Hong Kong, Indonesia, Malaysia, Singapore, Philippines and Thailand
- Serving temperature: Hot
- Main ingredients: Flour, egg, pork, shrimp

Wonton noodles
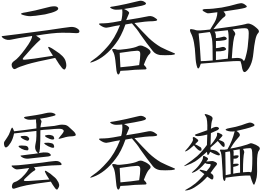
- Wonton noodles in Simplified Chinese (top) and Traditional Chinese character (below)
- Traditional Chinese: 雲吞麵
- Simplified Chinese: 云吞面
- Literal meaning: Wonton noodles
Transcriptions
Standard Mandarin
- Hanyu Pinyin: yúntūn miàn
Yue: Cantonese
- Yale Romanization: wàhn tān mihn
- Jyutping: wan4 tan1 min6

Wonton noodles (Chinese: 雲吞麵; Jyutping: wan4 tan1 min6; Cantonese Yale: wàhn tān mihn, also called wantan mee or wantan mein) is a noodle dish of Cantonese origin. Wonton noodles were given their name, húntún (Chinese: 餛飩; Jyutping: wan4 tan1), in the Tang Dynasty (618-907 CE). The dish is popular in Southern China, Hong Kong, Indonesia, Malaysia, Singapore, Vietnam and Thailand. The dish usually consists of fresh egg noodles served in a hot broth, garnished with leafy vegetables and wonton dumplings. The types of leafy vegetables used are usually gai-lan, also known as Chinese broccoli or Chinese kale. Another type of dumpling known as shui jiao (水餃) is sometimes served in place of wonton. Shrimp wonton are mostly known as Hong Kong dumplings. The wontons contain prawns, chicken or pork, and spring onions, with some chefs adding mushroom and black fungus. In Indonesia, especially in North Sumatra, West Kalimantan and South Sulawesi, wonton noodles are called mie pangsit.

== Regional variations ==
=== Guangzhou and Hong Kong ===
In Guangzhou and Hong Kong, wonton noodles are usually served in steaming hot soup with shrimp wontons and garnished with leafy vegetables. There are plenty of variations of this popular Cantonese dish, with different toppings and garnishes—for example, the soup and wontons being in separate bowls, the noodles being served relatively dry, served with toppings and garnishes, dressed with sauce, or dipped in the soup to eat it.

Guangzhou and Hong Kong-style wonton noodles have a few predominant characteristics: The wontons are predominantly prawn—with small amounts of minced pork, or no pork at all—traditional consisting of 70% shrimp and 30% pork. It is served with smooth thin noodles cooked al dente, in a hot, light brown soup (prepared from dried flounder). Garlic chives are often added as a garnish.

In order to ensure that the noodles are perfectly al dente, the noodles are blanched for only 10 seconds, after which they are rinsed under cold water and placed in the serving bowl atop the wontons. Hot bouillon soup is then scooped into the bowl, on top of the wonton noodles. This style's soup is said to be characterised by its flavourful, savoury taste, yet not so strong as to overpower the taste of the wonton and the noodles which it accompanies.

When served, the spoon is customarily placed at the bottom, with the wontons above the spoon and the noodles on top; this is done due to the belief that letting the noodles soak in the soup for too long will leave them overcooked.

Although the "wonton noodle" is synonymous with wonton and noodles served in hot soup, the dish may also be served "dry", as in lo mein (撈麵), where the wonton are placed on a large bed of noodles.

=== Cambodia ===
The dish has also been adopted into Cambodian cuisine, where it is called mee kiev (Khmer: មីគាវ) in Khmer. The broth is clear, topped with garlic chives and the dumplings are filled with seasoned minced pork and shrimp. Variations are often served with wheat vermicelli, a mixture of rice-wheat noodles or flat rice noodles (គុយទាវមីគាវ, kŭytéav mii kiəv).

=== Indonesia ===
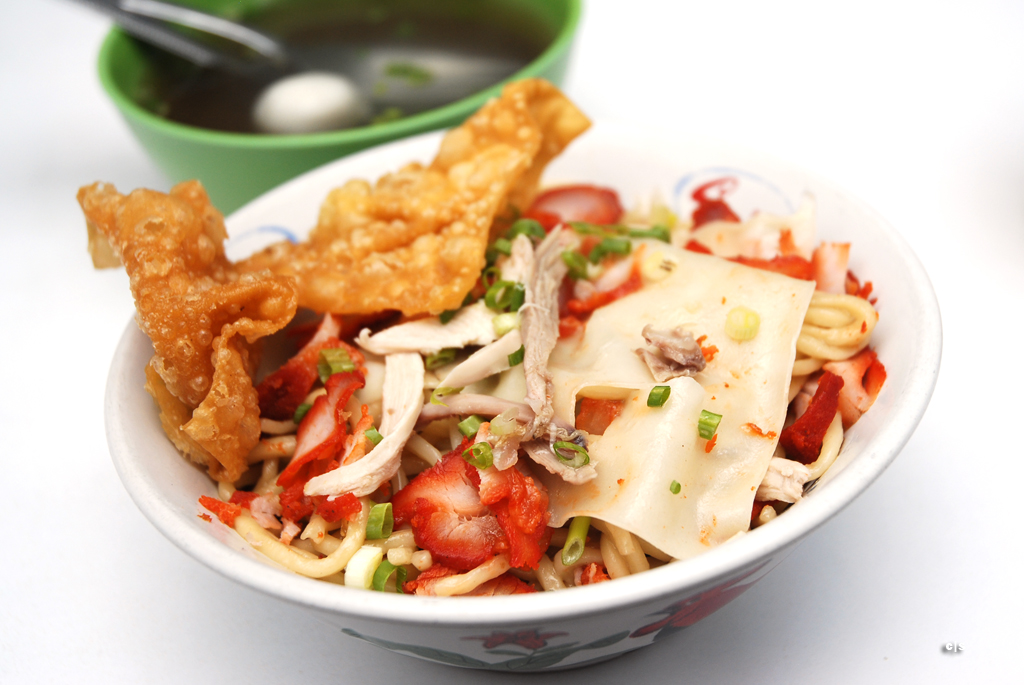
Makassar, South Sulawesi

Indonesia has their own style of wonton noodles called mie pangsit or pangsit mie. They are usually served dry with a separate broth. Fried wonton locally called pangsit goreng is one of the ingredients. Some cities with abundant typical mie pangsit are Malang in East Java, and Makassar in South Sulawesi.

=== Malaysia ===
Subang Jaya, Selangor

Malaysia offers different versions of the dish, with different states having different versions of the dish and there are versions from Johor, Pahang, Perak, Penang, Sarawak, and Selangor. The Malaysian version differs from the original in having slices of char siu (barbecued pork) added to the dish, as well as the possibility of the soup and wontons being in separate bowls, the noodles being served relatively dry, dressed with oyster sauce and garnished with chopped spring onions while the wontons are in a soup bowl usually with spring onions added in as well. Some stalls include deep-fried wontons in the dry versions as well and might serve pickled green chilis separately.

Often served wet, the Hong Kong version can be found at Cantonese noodle joints with it being dry or soup. In Malacca, wontons are placed together with the noodles and wonton soup can be ordered separately. The Malacca version is also usually spicier than the other Malaysian versions due to the use of a special unsweetened chili sauce.

Vegetarian wonton mee is also served in Malaysia in vegetarian restaurants. Instead of using pork to make char siu, wheat gluten is used.

=== Philippines ===
There are three distinct types of wonton noodle dishes found in Philippines. One is mami, which is a noodle soup that has egg noodles, wontons, and various vegetables in a hot broth. The name mami is derived from a Chinese phrase that means “pork noodles". Another type is pancit molo, which is similar to mami, but the noodles used are the wonton wrappers themselves. The third type of wonton noodles is stir-fry egg noodles sold by hawkers and in small "stand-up" type stalls. Here, the noodles are stir-fried with mung bean sprouts and vegetables, flavored with a range of sauces, and finally topped with wontons.

=== Singapore ===
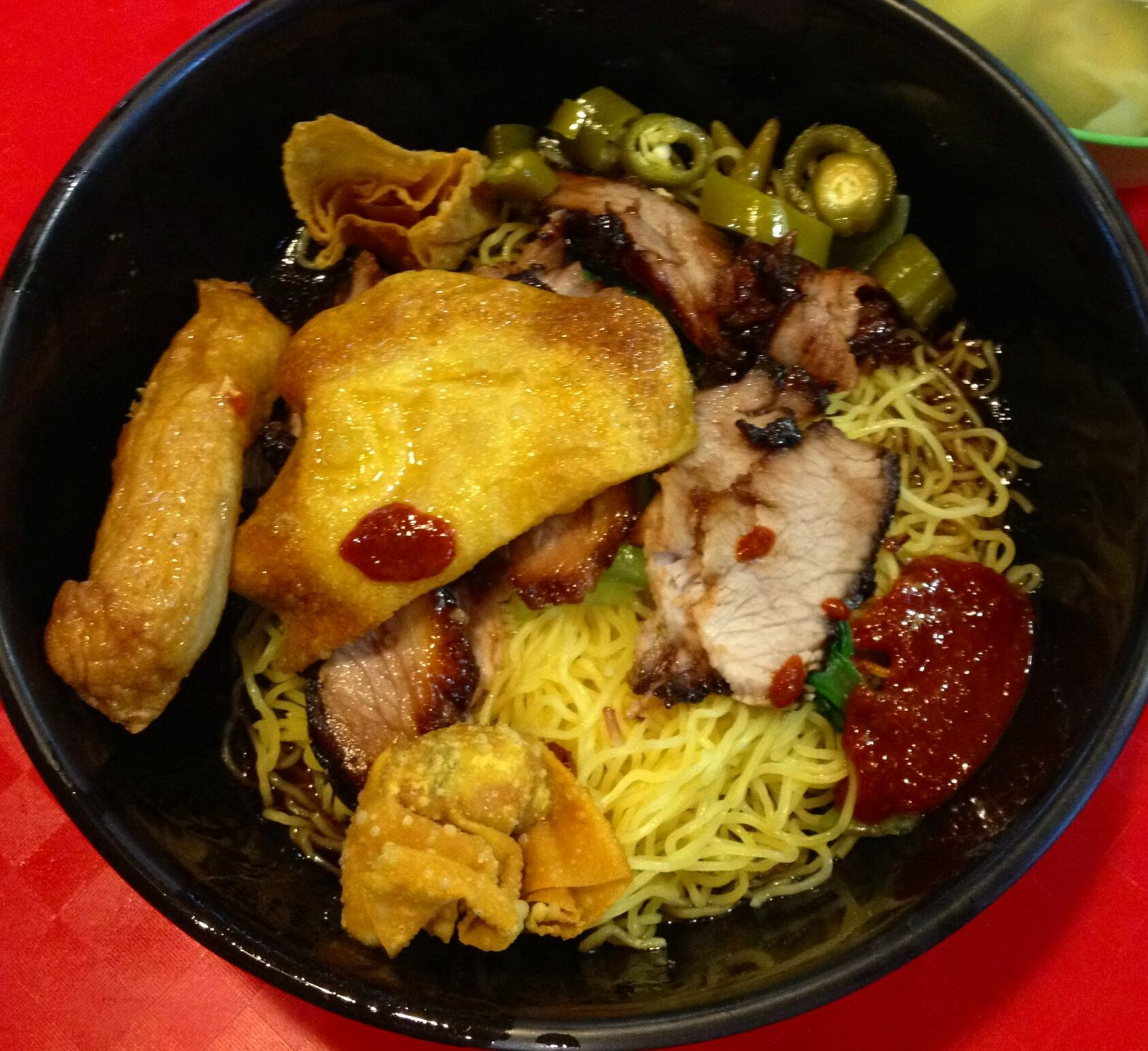
Singapore

Singapore wonton noodles includes noodles, leafy vegetables (preferably cai-xin), barbecued pork (char siu) and bite-sized dumplings or wonton. It is either served dry or in soup form with the former being more popular. If served dry, the wontons will be served in a separate bowl of soup. Shui jiao or prawn dumplings are served at some stalls and the original Hong Kong version is available at Cantonese restaurants and noodle joints. Fried wontons (wontons deep-fried in oil) are sometimes served instead of, or in addition to, those boiled in the soup. The Singaporean and Malaysian versions of the wonton noodle are similar to each other, though the Singapore version uses significantly less soy sauce and is often served with chilli ketchup.

=== Thailand ===
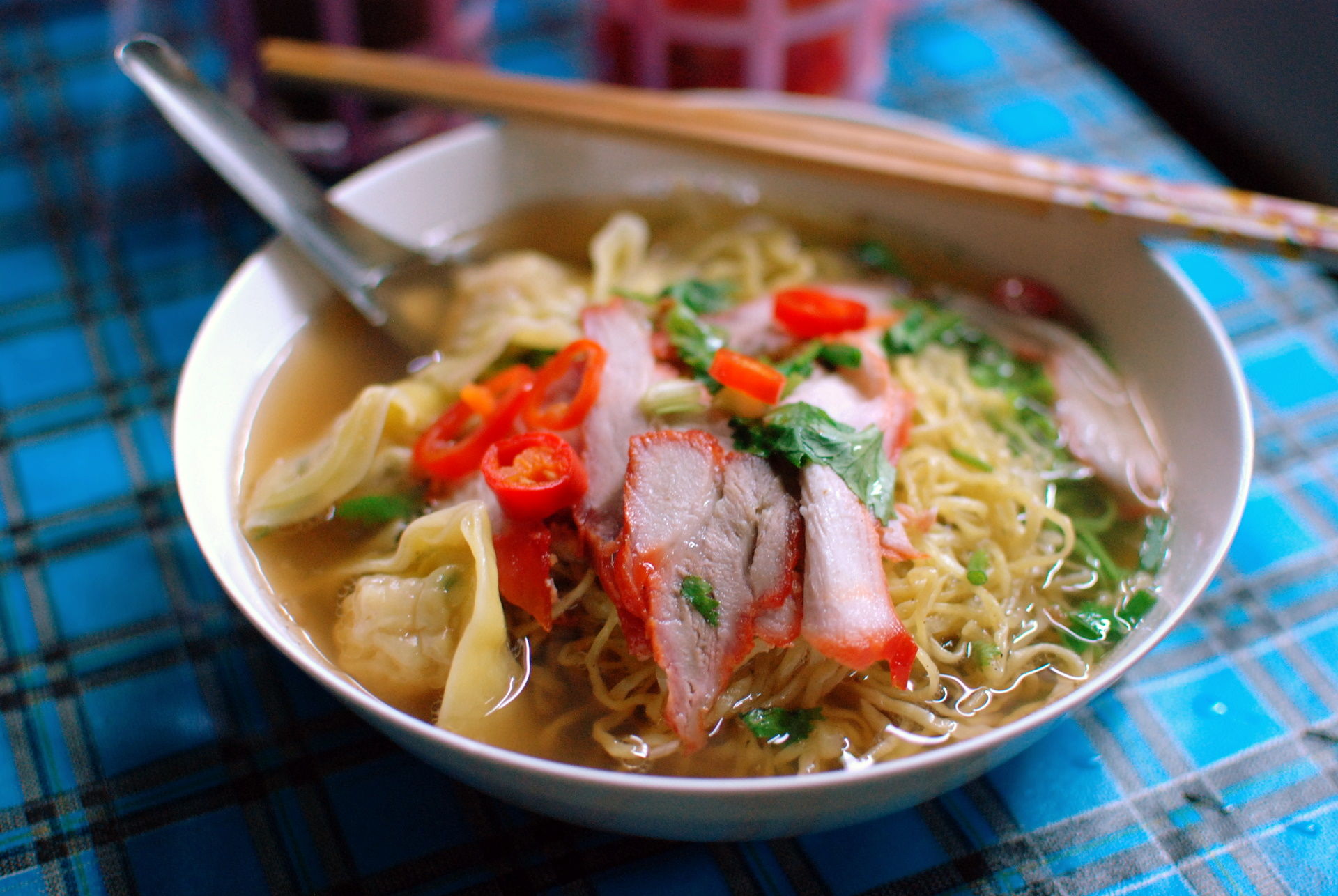
Chiang Mai, Thailand

Wonton noodles (Thai: บะหมี่เกี๊ยว; bami kiao) are also very popular in Thailand, where, as in Malaysia and Singapore, the dish is often ordered together with barbecued pork which is then called bami mu daeng kiao (Thai: บะหมี่หมูแดงเกี๊ยว; mu daeng meaning "red pork"). As is customary with many noodle soups of Chinese origin in Thailand, chillies preserved in vinegar, dried chilli flakes, sugar, and fish sauce are added to taste. The dish is mostly eaten in soup form but it can also be served dry with the broth on the side.

=== Vietnam ===
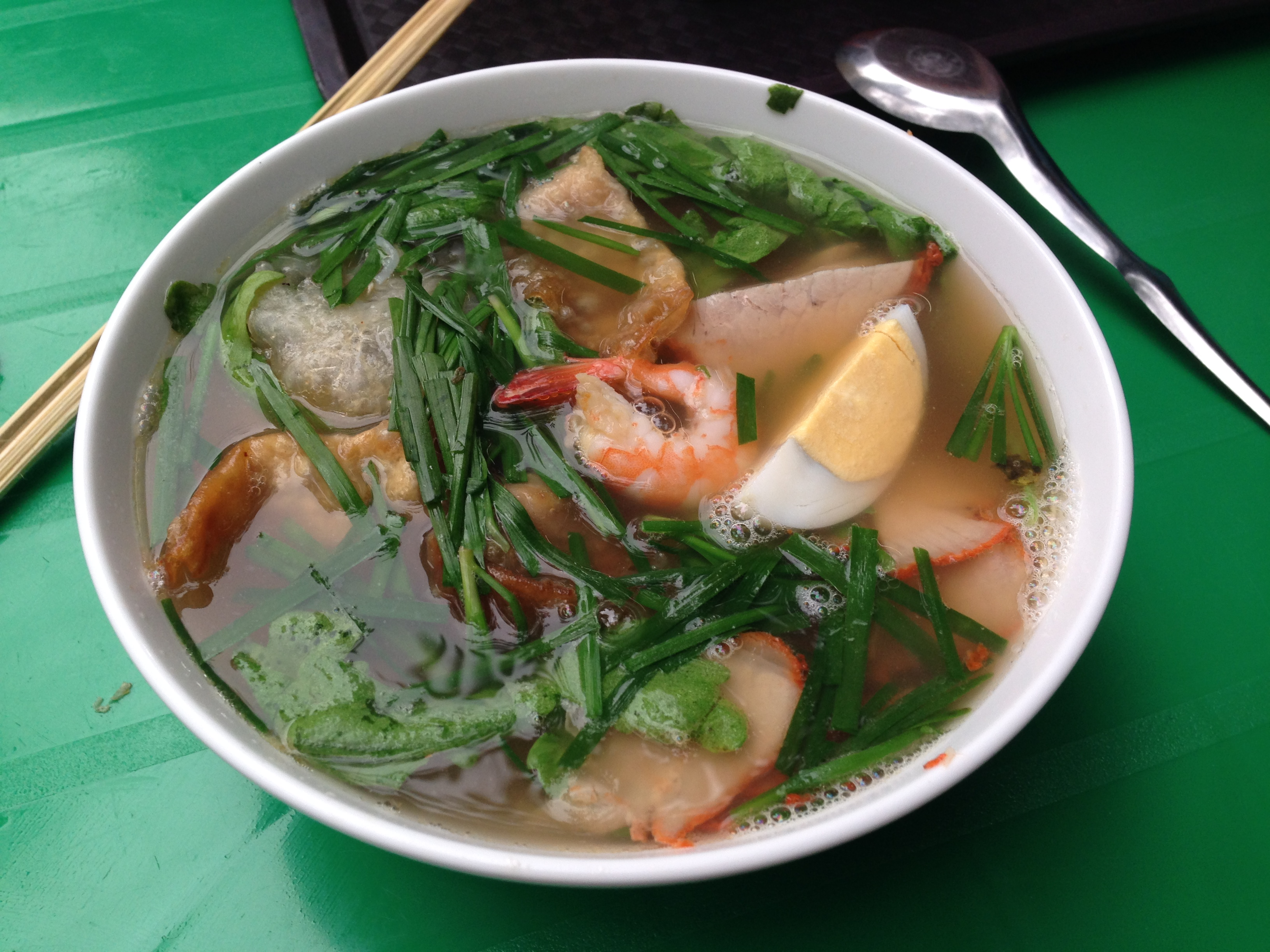
Hanoi, Vietnam

Súp mì or mì for short is a Chinese-Vietnamese noodle soup, introduced to Vietnam by Chinese immigrants. Mì hoành thánh (mì vằn thắn) is the Vietnamese version of wonton noodle soup. Noodles can be served with the soup or soup separately. Common ingredients are yellow wheat (egg) noodles with pork-based broth, ground pork, chives, and various meats and toppings.

== See also ==
- List of Chinese dishes
- List of Chinese soups
- List of noodle dishes
- List of soups
