= Bún riêu =

Traditional Vietnamese soup

Bun rieu
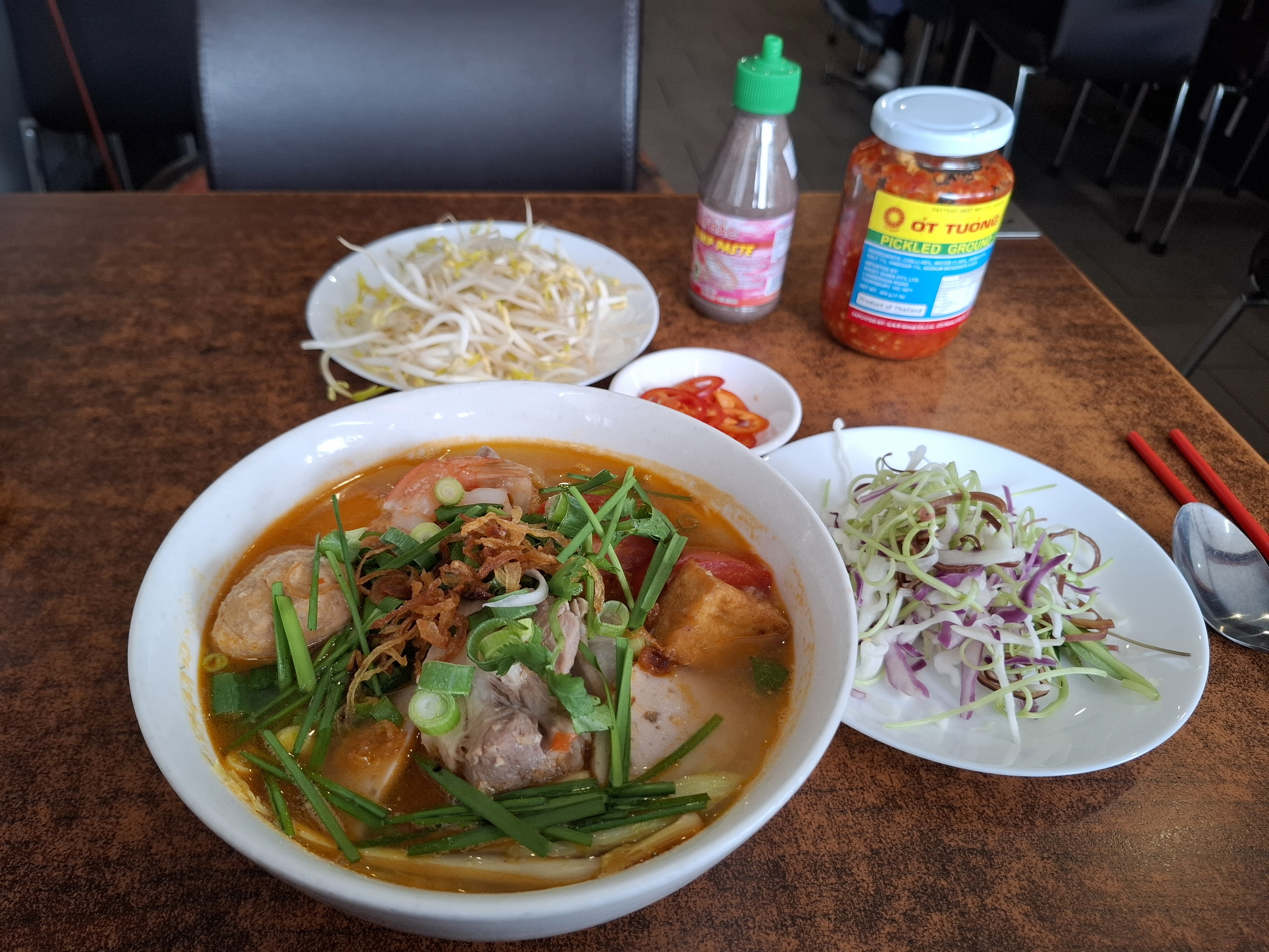
- Bún riêu đặc biệt ("special" bún riêu)
- Type: Soup
- Place of origin: Vietnam
- Region or state: Southeast Asia
- Main ingredients: Tomato, tofu, shrimp paste, meat, rice vermicelli
- Variations: Bún riêu cua

Bún riêu (Vietnamese: [ɓun˧˥ ʐiew˧]) is a traditional Vietnamese soup of clear stock and rice noodles. There are several varieties of bún riêu, including bún riêu cua (minced crab), bún riêu cá (minced crab and fish) and bún riêu ốc (minced crab and snail).

== Production ==
Bún riêu cua is served with tomato broth and topped with minced freshwater crab. In this dish, various freshwater paddy crabs are used, including the brown paddy crab found in rice paddies in Vietnam. The crabs are cleaned to remove dirt and sand, then pounded together (with the shell still on) into a fine paste. This paste is then strained— the liquid becoming the base for the soup along with tomato, and the solids used as the basis for crab cakes. Other ingredients for this dish include tamarind paste, fried tofu, mẻ or giấm bỗng (kinds of rice vinegar), quả dọc (Garcinia multiflora), annatto seeds (hạt điều màu) to redden the broth, huyết (congealed pig's blood), split water spinach stems, shredded banana flower, rau kinh giới (Elsholtzia ciliata), spearmint, perilla, bean sprouts and chả chay (vegetarian sausage). This dish is rich in nutrition: calcium from the ground crab shells, iron from the congealed pig's blood, and vitamins and fiber from the vegetables.

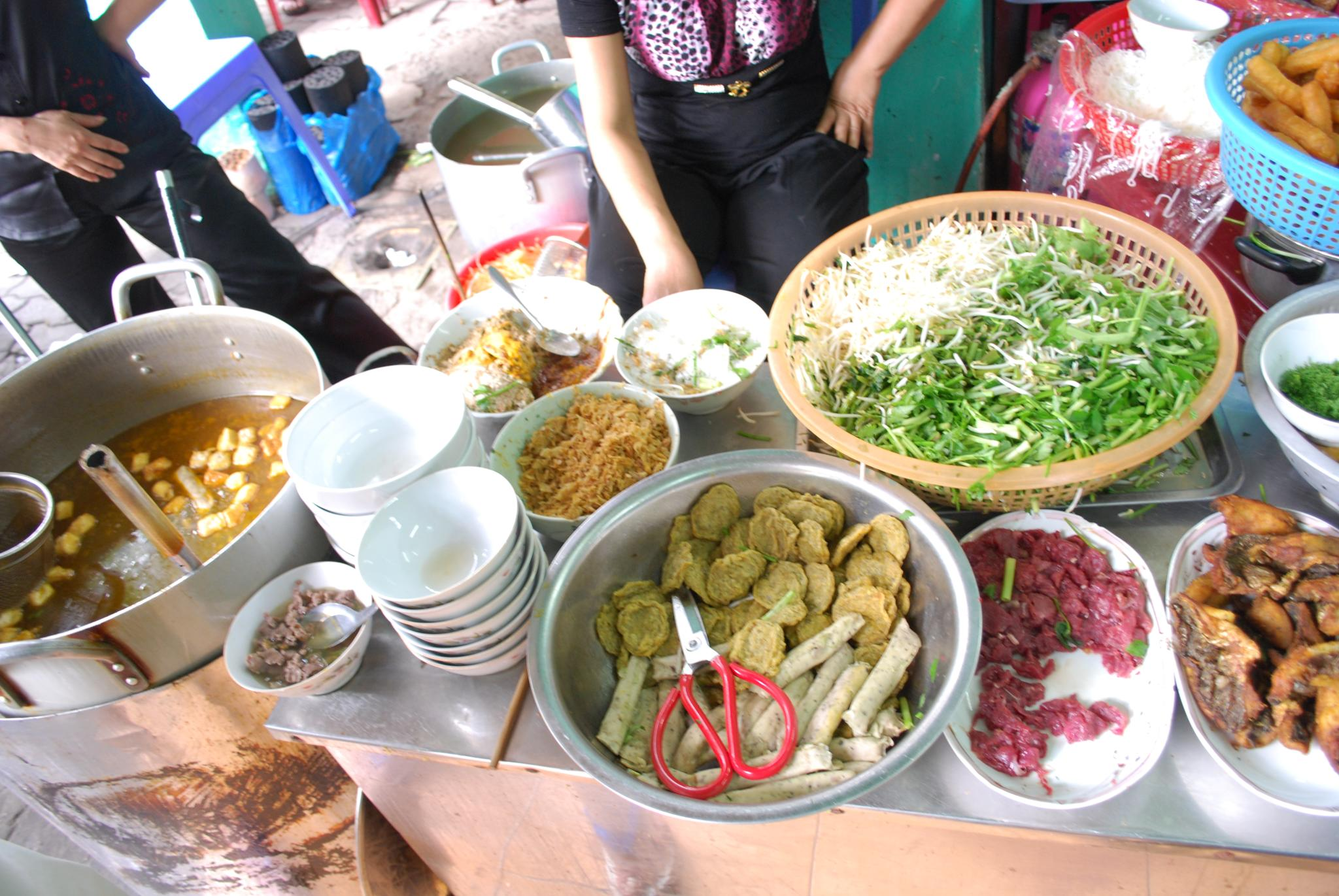
Ingredients of bún riêu cua

Bún riêu has a fresh sour flavor, so Vietnamese people like to enjoy it in summer. There are many restaurants in Vietnam that sell this dish.

== Ingredients ==
- Paddy crabs (crab meat and crab roe) (cua đồng, gạch cua)
- Tomato (cà chua)
- Egg
- Souring agents like Garcinia multiflora (quả dọc), dracontomelon (quả sấu), tamarind (quả me), starfruit (quả khế), rice vinegar (mẻ or giấm bỗng)
- Onion
- Fried tofu
- Accompanying greens: sliced banana flowers (hoa chuối thái nhỏ), water spinach (rau muống)
- Herbs: perilla (tía tô), Vietnamese balm (kinh giới)

== See also ==
- List of crab dishes
- List of seafood dishes
- Noodle soup
