= Hội An, Da Nang =

Ward of Da Nang, Vietnam

Hội An Phường Hội An
- Ward
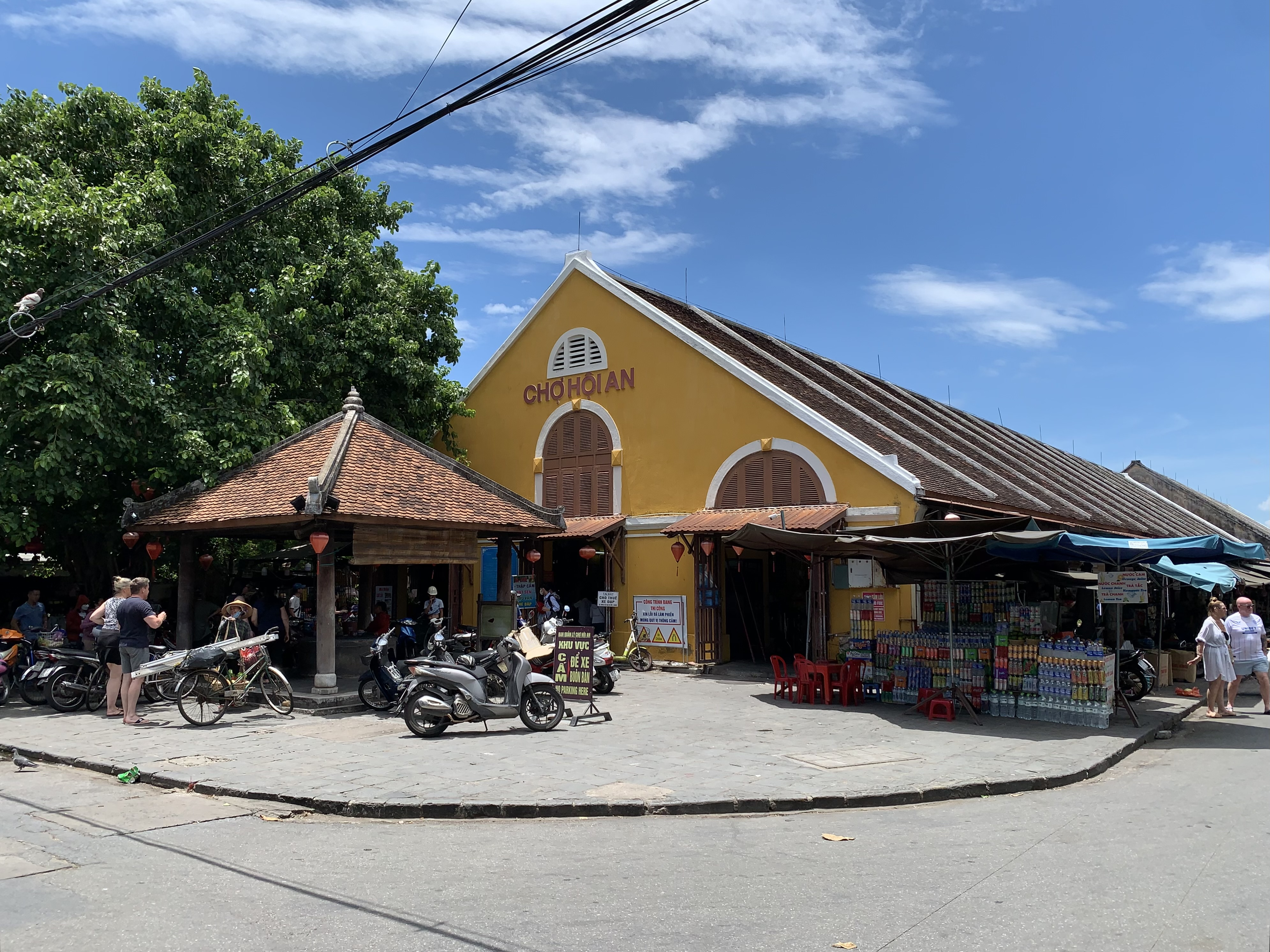
- Hội An Market
- Interactive map of Hội An
- Coordinates: 15°52′53″N 108°20′02″E
- Country: Vietnam
- Municipality: Da Nang
- Established: 16 June 2025

Area
  - Total: 4.17 sq mi (10.81 km^{2})

Population (2024)
  - Total: 37,222
  - Density: 8,918/sq mi (3,443/km^{2})
- Time zone: UTC+07:00 (Indochina Time)
- Administrative code: 20410

Hội An (Vietnamese: Phường Hội An) is a ward of Da Nang, Vietnam. It is one of the 94 new wards, communes and special zones of the city following the reorganization in 2025.

The ward comprises the Hội An Old Town and the two islands of Cẩm Nam and Cẩm Kim.

== History ==
On 16 June 2025, the National Assembly Standing Committee issued Resolution No. 1659/NQ-UBTVQH15 on the arrangement of commune-level administrative units of Da Nang in 2025 (effective from 16 June 2025). Accordingly, the entire land area and population of Minh An, Cẩm Phô, Sơn Phong, Cẩm Nam wards and Cẩm Kim commune of the former Hội An city will be integrated into a new ward named Hội An (Clause 21, Article 1).
