= Mì Quảng =

Vietnamese noodle dish

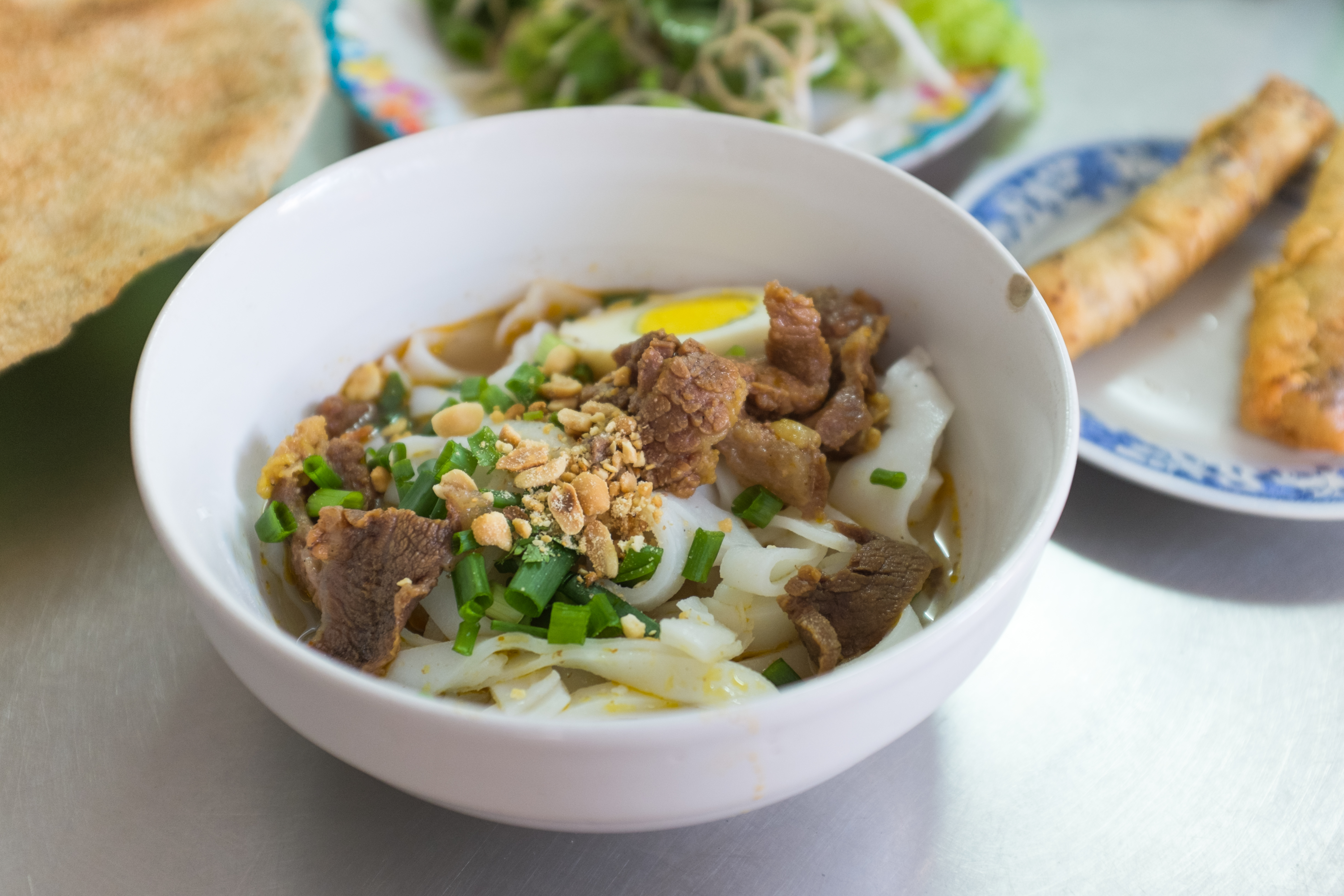
- A bowl of mì Quảng with pork and egg
- Type: Noodle
- Course: Main course
- Place of origin: Vietnam
- Region or state: Quảng Nam Province
- Associated cuisine: Vietnam
- Serving temperature: Warm
- Main ingredients: Rice noodles, shrimp or pork or chicken (sometimes fish or beef), various herbs
- Ingredients generally used: Turmeric, peanuts, toasted sesame rice crackers, chili peppers, lime

Mì Quảng (also written mỳ Quảng, Vietnamese: [mi˨˩ xʷaŋ˧˩˧]), literally "Quảng noodles", is a Vietnamese noodle dish that originated in Quảng Nam Province in central Vietnam. It is one of the region's most popular and well recognized food items, and is served on various occasions, like at family parties, death anniversaries, and Tết. It originated in the Ðà Nẵng and Quảng Nam area and has become available throughout the country, and is eaten at any time of the day.

The main ingredients alongside the rice noodle can include shrimp, fish, eel, pork, chicken, frog, and jellyfish.

In August 2024, mì Quảng and phở Nam Định were recognised as part of the national intangible cultural heritage list by the Ministry of Culture, Sports, and Tourism.

== Ingredients and serving ==
The main ingredients of mì Quảng are rice noodles, meat, and herbs, most commonly served with a small amount of broth, which is generally infused with turmeric. Peanut oil can also be added to make the dish more flavorful. Wide rice noodles are placed atop a bed of fresh herbs in a bowl (or vice versa), and then warm or tepid broth and meat are added. The broth is usually strongly flavored and only a small amount of it is used, generally enough to partially cover the vegetables.

Meats used in the dish may include one or more of the following: shrimp (tôm), pork (thịt heo), chicken (gà), or even fish (cá) or beef (bò). The broth is made by simmering the meat in water or bone broth for a more intense flavor, seasoned with fish sauce, black pepper, shallot and garlic. Turmeric is often added to the broth, giving it a yellowish color.

As with many Vietnamese dishes, mì Quảng is served with fresh herbs (rau); commonly used herbs include Thai basil, cilantro (ngò or rau mùi), scallions or onion leaves, Vietnamese coriander (rau răm), sliced banana flower (bắp chuối bào), and lettuce. A variety of other herbs may also be used in mì Quảng, including common knotgrass (rau đắng), water mint (rau húng lủi), perilla (rau tía tô), and heartleaf (rau diếp cá).

Mì Quảng is commonly garnished with peanuts and toasted sesame rice crackers called bánh tráng mè, which sets the dish apart from other noodle dishes. Additional ingredients may include hard-boiled quail eggs, steamed pork sausage (chả), or shredded pork rinds (tóp mỡ). Lime juice and fresh chili peppers are often used as an added seasoning; other seasonings may include soy sauce or chili sauce.

Mì Quảng can also be served without broth, as a salad (mì Quảng trộn).

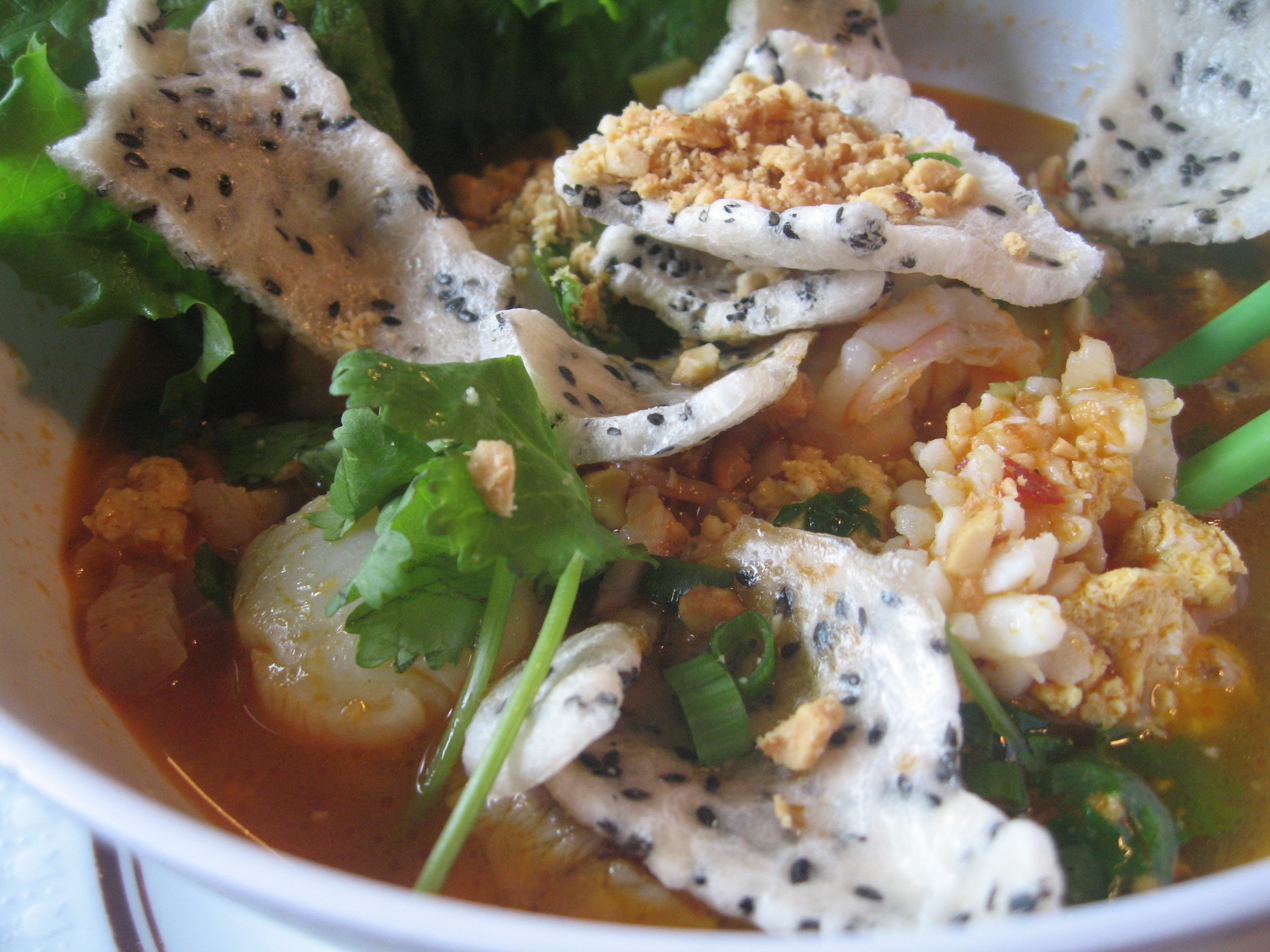
Served with pork, shrimp and toasted bánh tráng mè

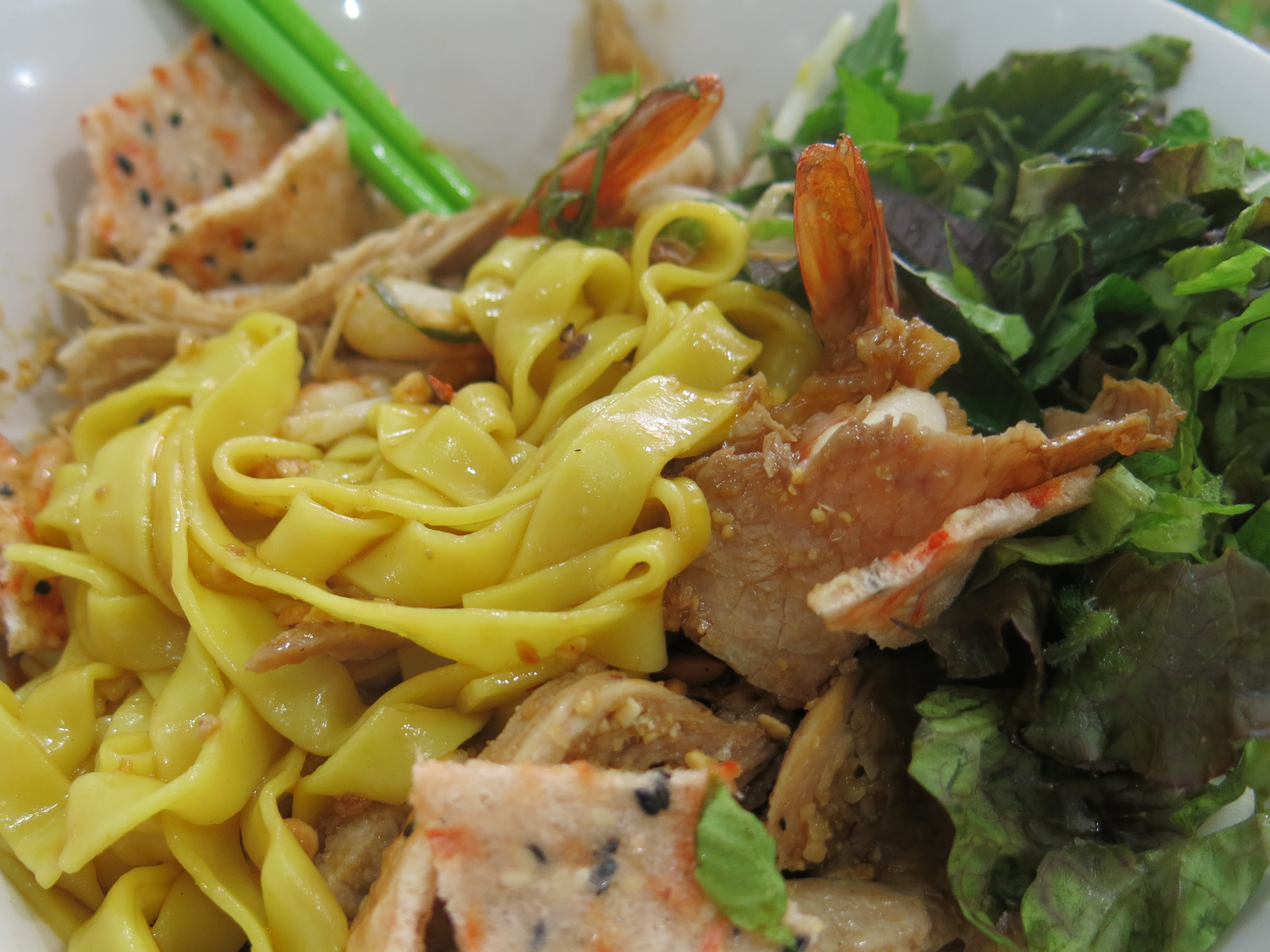
Served with pork, shrimp and yellow turmeric-dyed noodles

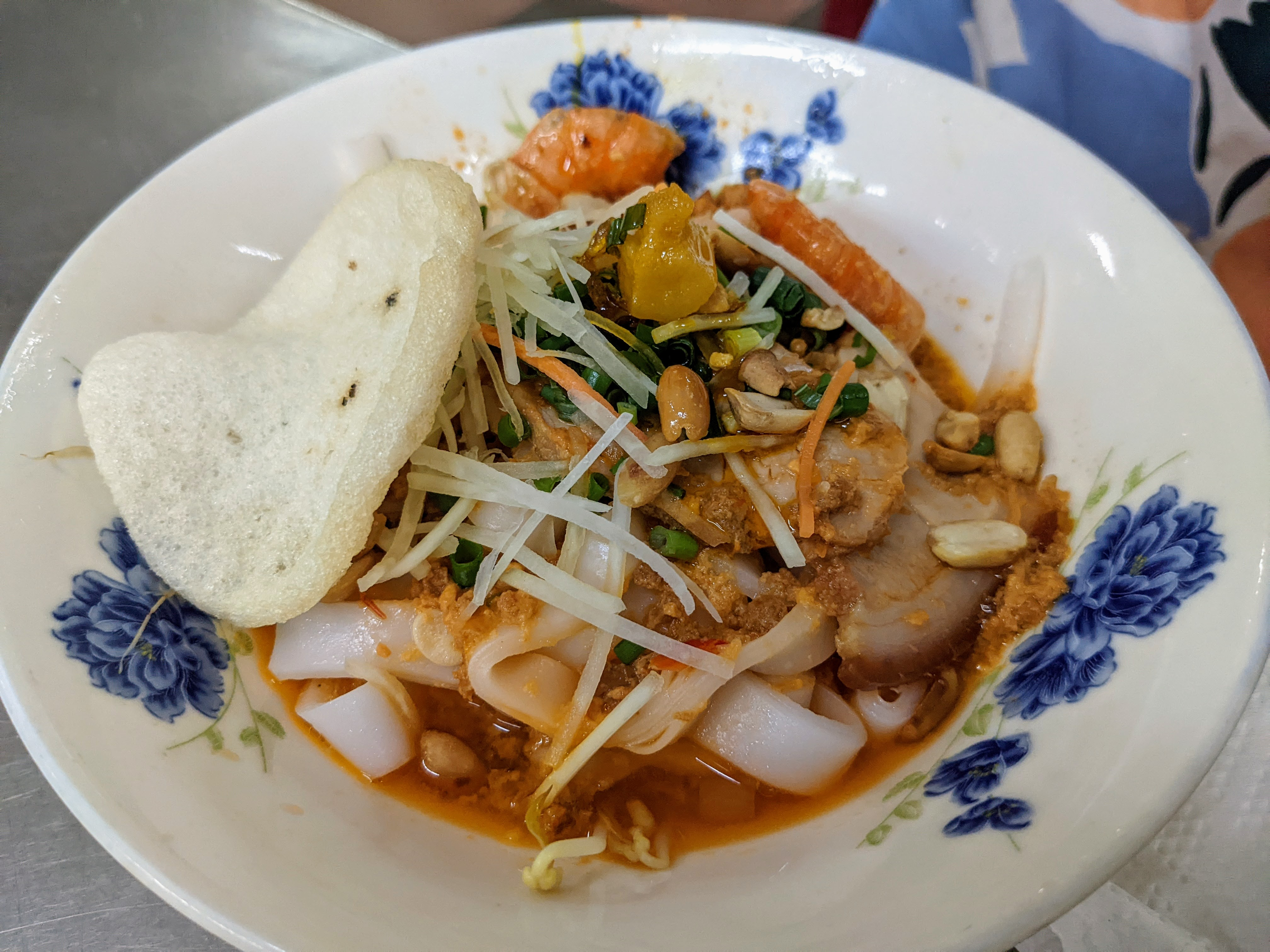
Served with pork, shrimp and prawn crackers (bánh phồng tôm)

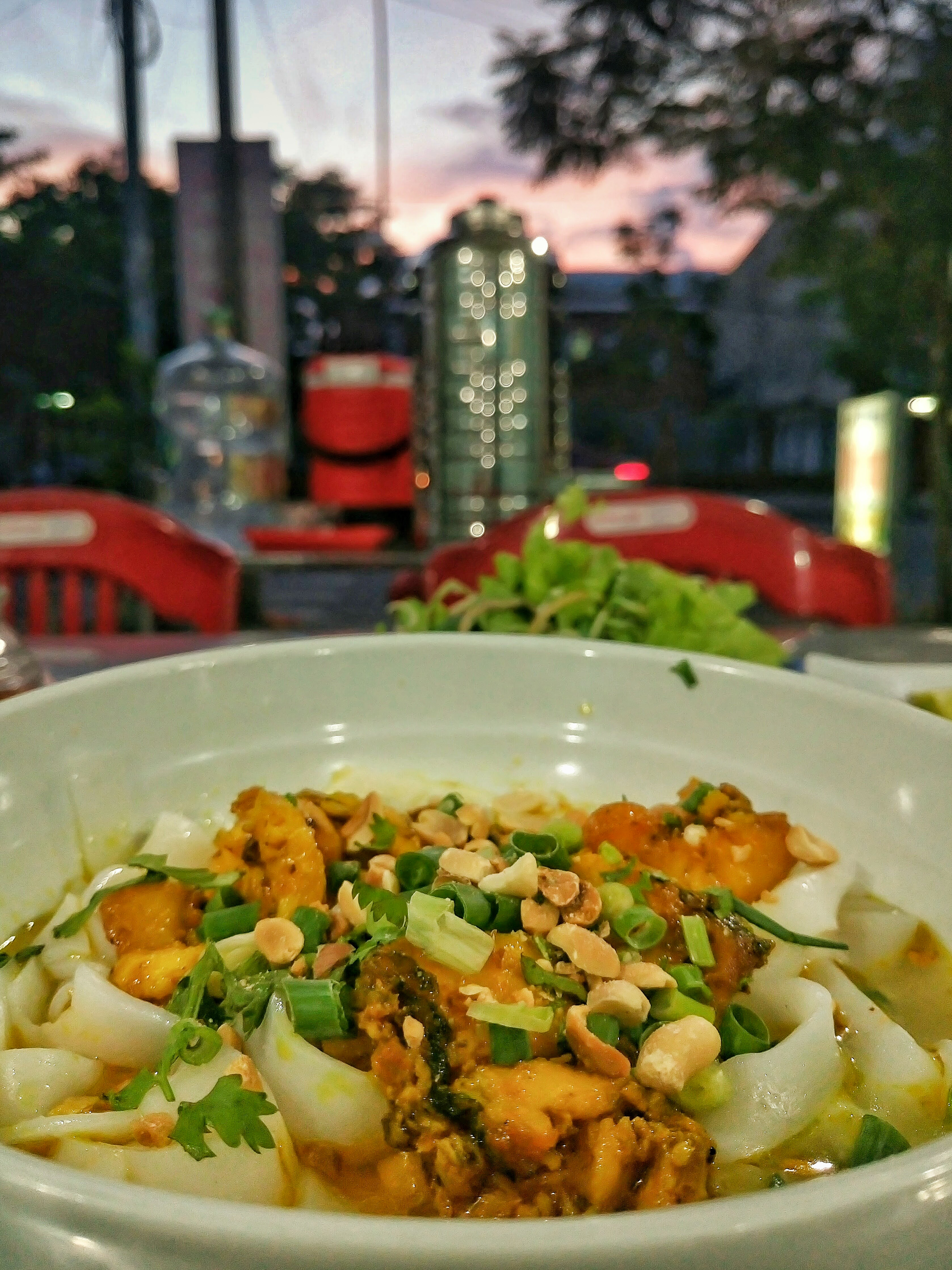
Served with snakehead fish (cá lóc)

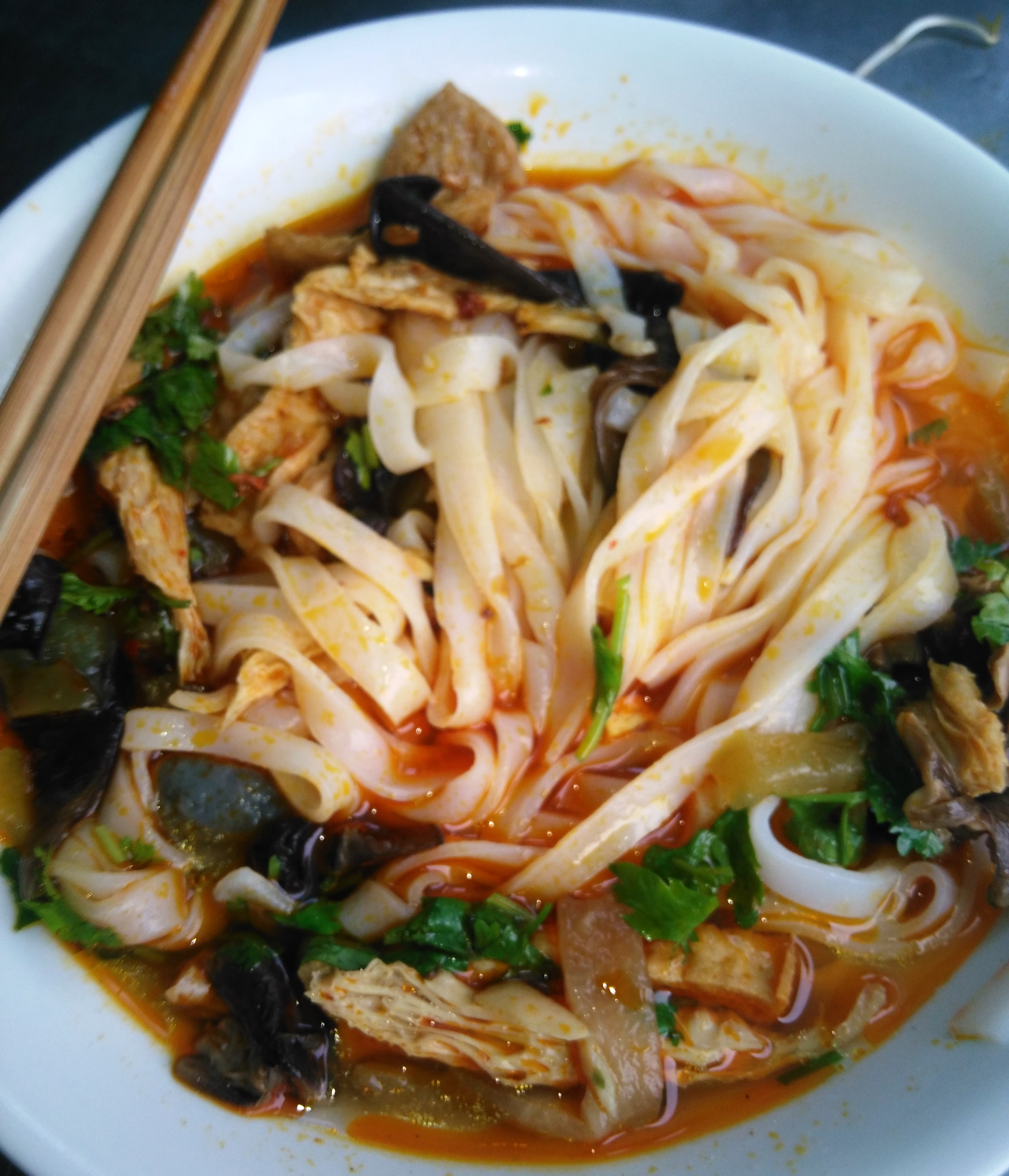
Vegetarian mì Quảng with imitation meat

== Cultural aspects ==
There is a Vietnamese saying about this dish:

Thương nhau múc bát chè xanh,
Làm tô mì Quảng mời anh xơi cùng.

This couplet describes a girl from Quảng Nam, a province on Vietnam's South Central Coast, who warmly invites her lover to drink a cup of tea and a bowl of mì Quảng, to show him the depth of her love for him.

== See also ==
- Vietnamese noodles
- Cao lau
