= List of Vietnamese culinary specialities =

This is a list of notable culinary specialities in Vietnamese cuisine by province.

== An Giang Province ==
- Khô cá lóc đồng

== Bà Rịa–Vũng Tàu province ==
- Ốc vú nàng, Côn Đảo island

== Bắc Ninh Province ==
- Bánh khoai Thị Cầu
- Bánh phu thê Đình Bảng
- Chè lam - made from ground glutinous rice
- Bánh tẻ, Chờ village, Yên Phong District

== Bến Tre Province ==
- Coconut candy

== Bình Định Province ==
- Bánh hỏi, Qui Nhơn - rice vermicelli woven into intricate bundles
- Bún chả cá Quy Nhơn, Qui Nhơn city

== Bình Thuận Province ==
- Bánh rế

== Cần Thơ city ==
- Hủ tiếu

== Cao Bằng Province ==
- Chè đắng

== Đắk Lắk Province ==
- Rượu cần

== Đồng Tháp Province ==
- Bánh Phồng Tôm - traditional snack made from ground shrimp, sometimes mixed with cuttlefish, arrowroot flour, tapioca flour, onion, garlic, sugar, fish sauce, cracked black pepper and salt.

== Hà Nội ==
- Phở - Rice noodle soup
- Bánh cuốn Thanh Trì, Thanh Trì District
- Bún chả cá Lã Vọng - fish fillets that are grilled then pan fried and served with Bún and vegetables.
- Cốm
- Bún chả Hà Nội - thin rice vermicelli served cold with grilled marinated pork similar to Bún thịt nướng
- Bún mọc

== Hải Dương Province ==
- Bánh đậu xanh - sweet mung bean paste
- Rượu Phú Lộc

== Ho Chi Minh City / Sai Gon ==
- Sâm bổ lượng

== Huế city ==
- Bún bò Huế
- Bánh bèo
- Cơm hến - rice with clams
- Bánh bột lọc - cassava cake packed with shrimp
- Bánh tét làng Chuồn, Phú An commune, Phú Vang District
- Chè nhãn bọc hạt sen - made from longan and lotus seeds
- Chè đậu ngự - made from Phaseolus lunatus (or moon beans) - an imperial dish
- Bánh khoái Thượng Tứ
- Chạo tôm

== Khánh Hòa Province ==
- Bánh ướt Diên Khánh, Diên Khánh District - thin pancake wrapper consisting of rice noodle sheets

== Kiên Giang Province ==
- Bún kèn, Phú Quốc island
- Phu Quoc fish sauce, Phu Quoc Island.
  - Red Boat, a notable manufacturer of Phu Quoc fish sauce.

== Long An Province ==
- Rượu đế Gò Đen, Mỹ Yên commune, Bến Lức District

== Nam Định Province ==
- Bún Cá Nam Định - Nam Định Fish Noodle Soup
- Chè kho

== Nghệ An Province ==
- Bánh đúc hến, Nam Đàn District - cakes made from either non-glutinous rice flour or corn flour with clams

== Phú Yên Province ==
- Bánh hỏi lòng heo Gò Duối, Gò Duối market, Xuân Lộc commune, Sông Cầu District

== Quảng Bình Province ==
- Bánh bèo
- Bánh khoái

== Quảng Nam Province ==
- Cao lầu Hội An
- Mì Quảng

== Quảng Ninh Province ==
- Nem chua Quảng Yên

== Sóc Trăng Province ==
- Bánh pía - Teochew-style mooncake

== Sơn La Province ==
- Chè Tà Xùa, Tà Xùa commune, Bắc Yên District

== Tây Ninh Province ==
- Trảng Bàng dew-wetted rice paper

== Tuyên Quang Province ==
- Bánh mật

== Thái Bình Province ==
- Bánh cáy

== Vĩnh Phúc Province ==
- Nem chua Vĩnh Yên

== See also ==
- Vietnamese cuisine
- Vietnamese noodles
- List of Vietnamese dishes
- List of Vietnamese ingredients
