= List of Vietnamese ingredients =

This is a list of ingredients found in Vietnamese cuisine.

== Meat ==
| Name Local name | Image | Region | Usage | Description |
|---|---|---|---|---|
| Beef thịt bò | | | Phở, Gỏi bò, Bò lá lốt, Bò nướng hành | Beef is used less commonly, save for pho and the famed Bò 7 món ("Seven-course beef") |
| Chicken thịt gà | | | | |
| fish cá | | | | |
| goat meat thịt dê | | | | |
| Dog meat thịt chó | | | | |
| Frog legs đùi ếch | | | | |
| Shrimp tôm | | | | |
| Pork thịt heo | | | | |
| Nereididae rươi | | Hanoi | fried "rươi" omelette (chả rươi), fermented "rươi" sauce (mắm rươi), steamed rươi (rươi hấp), stir-fried rươi with radish or bamboo shoot (rươi xào củ niễng măng tươi hay củ cải). | ragworms |
| Turtle rùa | | Cà Mau province | | |
| Snail; Ốc bươu | | | stuffed with pork (Ốc bươu nhồi thịt) or steamed and served with rice vinegar (ốc bươu hấp hèm) | |

== Insects ==
| Name Local name | Image | Region | Usage | Description |
|---|---|---|---|---|
| Lethocerus indicus Cà cuống | | | | giant water bug |

== Grain and grain-based ingredients ==
| Name Local name | Image | Region | Usage | Description |
|---|---|---|---|---|
| Glutinous rice gạo nếp | | | | |
| Wheat gluten (food) mì căng or mì căn | | | | meat substitute |

== Legume ==
| Name Local name | Image | Region | Usage | Description |
|---|---|---|---|---|
| Black-eyed pea đậu trắng | | | | |
| Hyacinth bean đậu ván | | | | |
| Mung bean đậu xanh | | | | |
| Winged bean đậu rồng | | | | |

== Vegetables ==
| Name Local name | Image | Region | Usage | Description |
|---|---|---|---|---|
| Allium chinense củ kiệu | | | | |
| Amaranth rau dền | | | | |
| Bitter melon Khổ qua, mướp đắng | | | Canh Khổ Qua (Bitter Melon Soup), Tea, Omlet with bittermelon. Leaves and young shoots can be used as in stir fries. | |
| Bok choy Cải bó xôi | | | | |
| Cabbage; Cải bắp, bắp cải | | | | |
| Carrot; Cà rốt | | | | |
| Cauliflower; Súp-lơ or bông cải | | | | |
| Ceylon spinach Mồng tơi | | | | |
| Chayote; Su su | | | | |
| Centella asiatica rau má | | | | pennywort |
| Chili pepper ớt | | | | |
| Leucocasia gigantea dọc mùng, môn bạc hà | | | Canh chua, Bún bung, Bún móng giò | Giant elephant ear or Indian taro |
| Cucumber dưa leo | | | | |
| Garland chrysanthemum cải cúc or tần ô | | | | Crown daisy |
| White radish củ cải trắng | | | | |
| Eggplant cà tím, cà dái dê | | | | |
| Eleocharis dulcis or water chestnut củ năng | | | | |
| Water dropwort rau cần ta | | | | |
| Katuk; Sweet leaf rau ngót | | | | |
| Joseph's-coat rau dền đỏ | | | | |
| Telosma cordata hoa thiên lý | | | | |
| Water cress cải xoong | | | | |
| Water spinach rau muống | | | | |
| Grape leaves lá nho | | | | |
| Welsh onion hành | | | mỡ hành (chopped scallions cooked by pouring boiling oil over them to release their aroma), Bò nướng hành (strips of beef wrapped around a scallion) | |

== Spices and herbs ==
| Name Local name | Image | Region | Usage | Description |
|---|---|---|---|---|
| Bacopa monnieri rau đắng | | | | Indian pennywort, water hyssop, brahmi |
| Black cardamom bạch đậu khấu | | | | |
| Dill thì là | | | chả cá and canh cá thì là | |
| Elsholtzia ciliata kinh giới | | | typically used raw to accompany cooked foods such as grilled meats. | Vietnamese balm, Vietnamese mint |
| Eryngium foetidum ngò gai | | | garnish soups, accompanying phở | Long coriander/saw tooth coriander/culantro |
| Houttuynia cordata giấp cá or diếp cá | | | | fish mint, fishy-smell herb |
| Láng basil húng Láng, húng quế Láng | | Láng Village alongside Red River, Hanoi | herb platters for dishes like phở, bún chả, gỏi cuốn; traditional soups and stir-fries | features small dark-green leaves, purple stems and veins, and a rich, distinctively sweet-smelling aroma |
| Lemon grass sả | | | gà kho, bún bò Huế, fried fish, marinate meats | |
| Lolot pepper lá lốt | | | found in meat dishes like bò lá lốt | wild betel leaves |
| Peppermint húng cây or rau bạc hà | | | | |
| Perilla tía tô | | | mixed with salads | beefsteak plant, shiso |
| Rice paddy herb ngò ôm | | near waterways, and wetlands | used as a garnish particularly for canh chua, accompanying salads | |
| Spearmint húng lủi | | | | |
| Syzygium nervosum (lá) vối, trâm nắp | | | | |
| Thai basil rau quế, hung quế, lá quế | | | accompanying phở, garnish | |
| Turmeric nghệ | | | In curries, dried tumeric is often used to marinate fish | |
| Vietnamese coriander rau răm | | | found in most vietnamese salads, eaten with hột vịt lộn (balut) | |

== Fruits ==
| Name Local name | Image | Region | Usage | Description |
|---|---|---|---|---|
| Acerola xơ-ri | | | | |
| Annona or sugar-apple, na, mãng cầu | | | | |
| Apricot mơ | | | | |
| Buddha's hand phật thủ | | | | |
| Canistel trái trứng gà | | | | |
| Cherimoya mãng cầu tây | | | | |
| Chinese date táo tàu | | | | |
| Cam sành | | | | green orange |
| Sugar-apple bình bát or mãng cầu | | | | Custard apple |
| Dracontomelon sấu | | | | |
| Durian sầu riêng | | | | |
| Gac gấc | | | Xôi gấc – made with sweet glutinous rice and the aril and seeds of the gấc fruit | Baby Jackfruit, Spiny Bitter Gourd, Sweet Gourd, or Cochinchin Gourd |
| Chrysophyllum cainito vú sữa | | | | Green star apple |
| Guava ổi | | | | |
| Jackfruit mít | | | Mít sấy – Jackfruit chips | |
| Langsat bòn bon | | | | |
| Lime (fruit) chanh (chanh ta) | | | Chanh muối – salted, pickled lime | |
| Duku nhãn | | | Chè nhãn | |
| Lychee vải | | | | |
| Mandarin orange quýt | | | | |
| Mango xoài | | | | |
| Mangosteen măng cụt | | | | |
| Otaheite gooseberry chùm ruột | | | | |
| Papaya đu đủ | | | | |
| Persimmon hồng | | | | |
| Pitaya dragon fruit, thanh long | | | | |
| Plum mận | | | | |
| Pomegranate lựu | | | | |
| Pomelo bưởi | | | | |
| Rambutan chôm chôm | | | | |
| Sapodilla hồng xiêm or xa-pô-chê | | | | |
| Spondias | | | | |
| Spondias cytherea cóc | | | | |
| Soursop mãng cầu Xiêm | | | | |
| Star fruit khế | | | | |
| Syzygium jambos Rose apple roi in the North, lý in the South | | | | |
| Tomato cà chua | | | | |
| Syzygium aqueum Water apple roi in the north, mận in the south | | | | |
| Watermelon dưa hấu | | | | |

== Others ==
| Name Local name | Image | Region | Usage | Description |
|---|---|---|---|---|
| Eryngium foetidum | | | | |
| Galangal | | | | |
| Garland chrysanthemum | | | | |
| Gnaphalium affine | | | | |
| Houttuynia | | | | |
| Jícama | | | | |
| Lethocerus indicus | | | | |
| Limnophila aromatica | | | | |
| Lolot lá lốt | | | a flavoring wrap for grilling meats (Bò cuốn lá lốt) | Piper lolot or lolot pepper |
| Luffa | | | | |
| Luffa acutangula | | | | |
| Luffa aegyptiaca | | | | |
| Mesona | | | | |
| Peristrophe roxburghiana | | | | |
| Phaseolus lunatus đậu ngự | | Thừa Thiên Huế province | Chè đậu ngự | lima beans |
| Sapodilla | | | | |
| Sauropus androgynus | | | | |
| Sesbania bispinosa | | | | |
| Sesbania grandiflora | | | | |
| Sesbania sesban | | | | |
| Sterculia lychnophora | | | | |
| Syzygium jambos | | | | |
| Syzygium samarangense | | | | |
| Volvariella volvacea | | | | |

== See also ==
- Vietnamese cuisine
- List of Vietnamese culinary specialities
- List of Vietnamese dishes
- Vietnamese noodles
