= Bò nướng lá lốt =

Vietnamese beef in lolot leaves

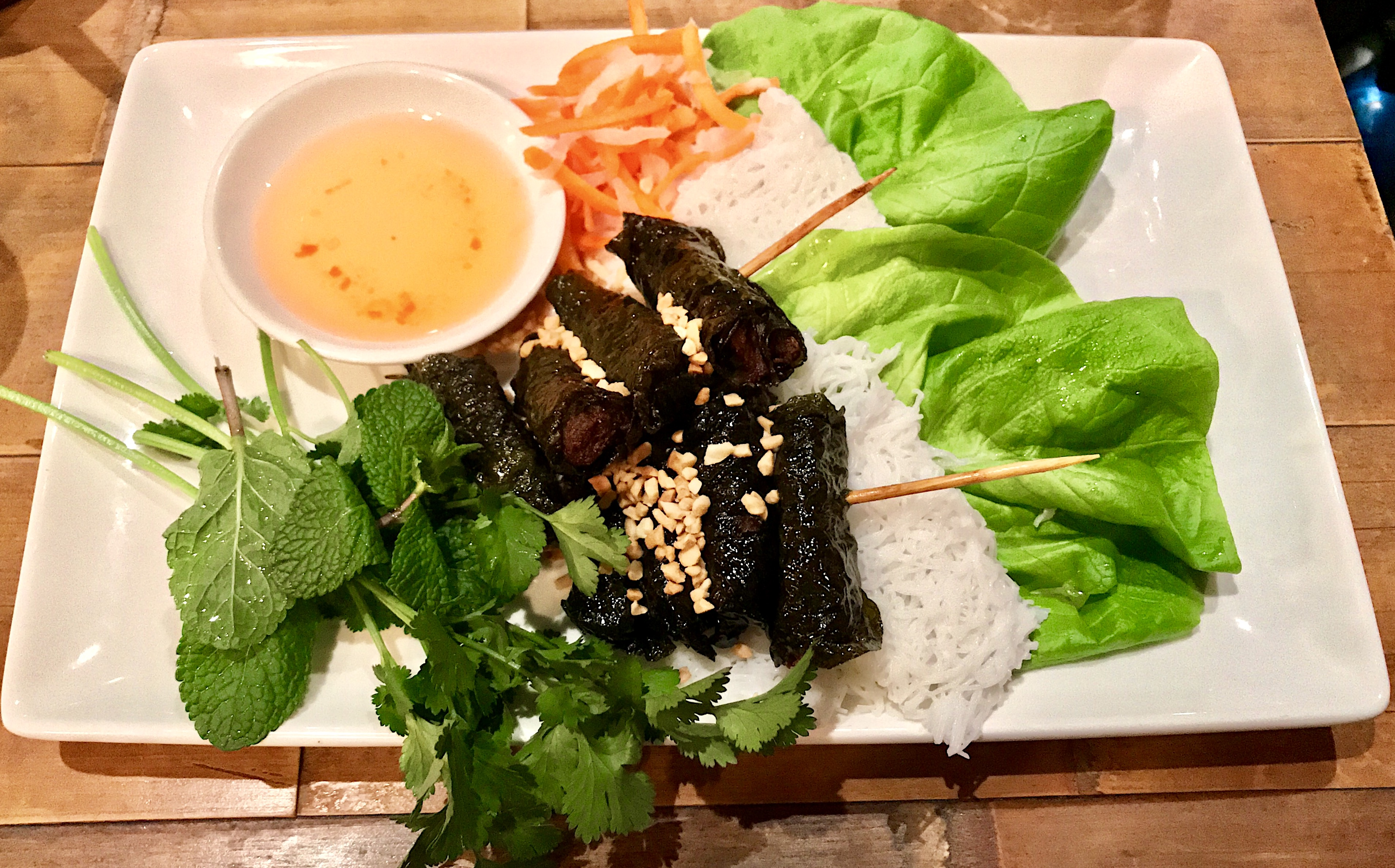
- Bò nướng lá lốt in a Vietnamese restaurant in Manchester, United Kingdom
- Course: Main course, appetizer
- Place of origin: Vietnam
- Serving temperature: Grilled, fried, hot, room temperature
- Main ingredients: Ground beef, lá lốt

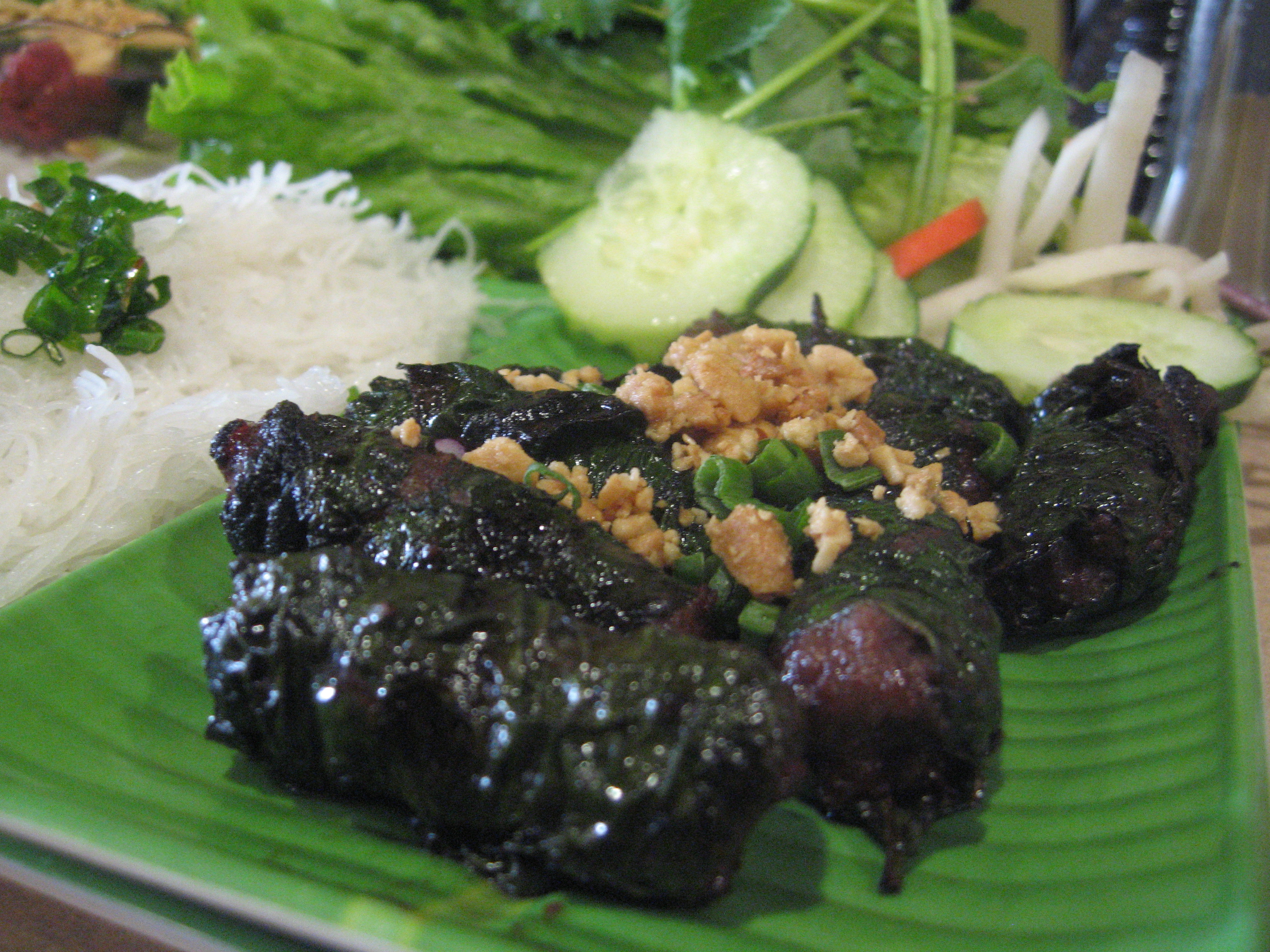
Bò nướng lá lốt

Bò nướng lá lốt ("grilled beef in lolot leaf") or thịt bò lá lốt, bò lá lốt is a dish consisting of Vietnamese beef in lolot leaves, which are called "betel" leaves by some English magazines. The leaves smell spicy but have a medicinal taste. The food is often served or sold at barbecues, and is the 5th out of 7 courses in the multi-course meal Bò 7 món. There is a northern version called chả lá lốt using pork instead of beef and often pan-fried instead of grilled.

In Vietnam, the lolot leaf is also called lá lốt.

Bò lá lốt is often topped with crushed roasted peanuts and green onions, or served with lettuce, mint leaves, daikon and carrot pickles, and vermicelli noodles, dipped in nước mắm pha (Vietnamese dipping sauce).

== See also ==
- Lolot leaf, plant
