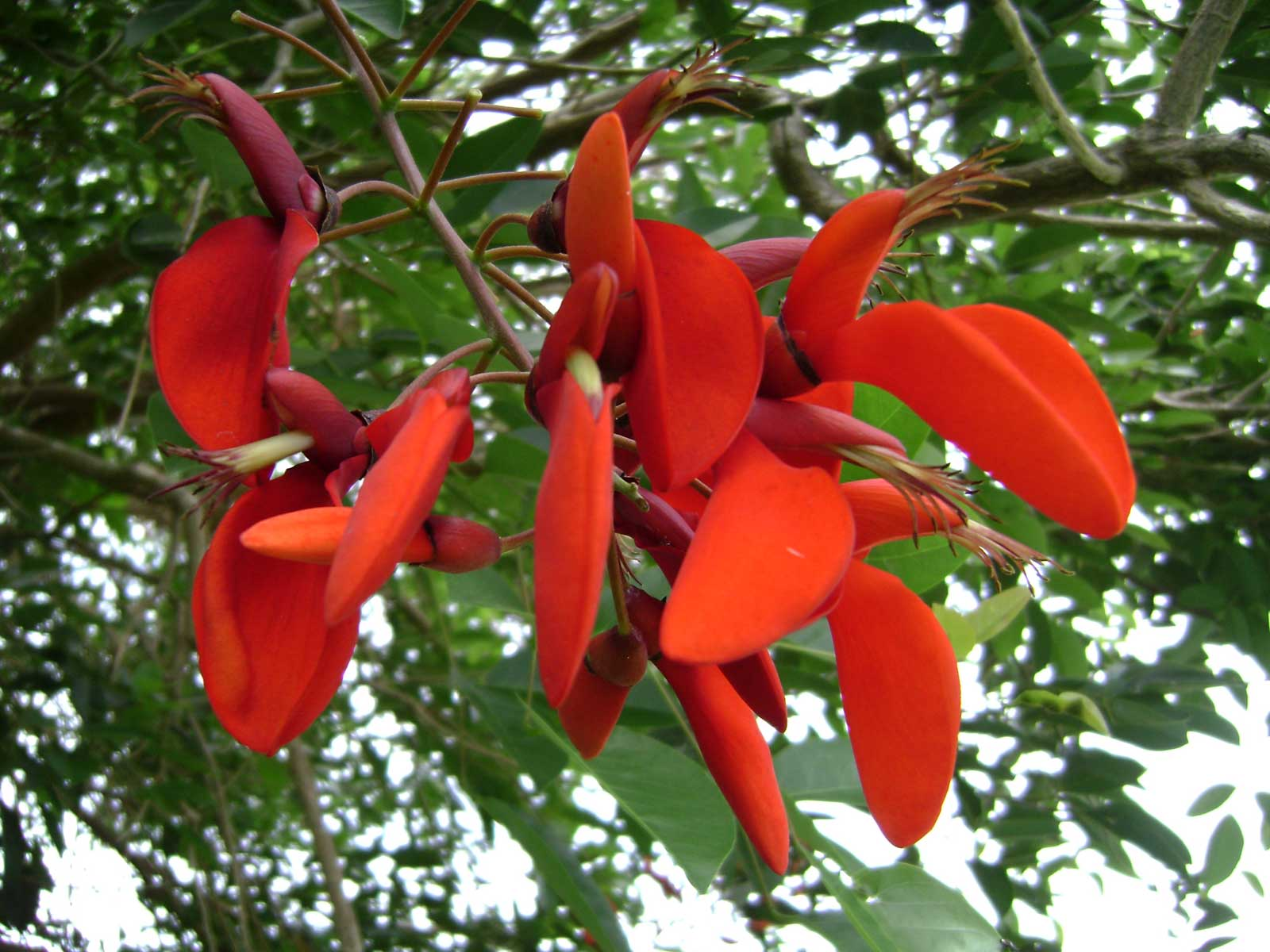

Conservation status
- Least Concern (IUCN 3.1)

Scientific classification
- Kingdom: Plantae
- Clade: Tracheophytes
- Clade: Angiosperms
- Clade: Eudicots
- Clade: Rosids
- Order: Fabales
- Family: Fabaceae
- Subfamily: Faboideae
- Genus: Erythrina
- Species: E. fusca

Binomial name
- Erythrina fusca Lour.

Synonyms
- List: Corallodendron fuscum (Lour.) Kuntze; Corallodendron glaucum (Willd.) Kuntze; Corallodendron ovalifolium (Roxb.) Kuntze; Corallodendron patens (Moc. & Sessé ex DC.) Kuntze; Duchassaingia glauca (Willd.) Walp.; Duchassaingia ovalifolia (Roxb.) Walp.; Erythrina afra Blanco; Erythrina argentea Blume ex Miq.; Erythrina atrosanguinea Ridl.; Erythrina fusca var. inermis (Pulle) Rock; Erythrina glauca Willd.; Erythrina moelebei Vieill. ex Guillaumin & Beauvis.; Erythrina ovalifolia Roxb.; Erythrina ovalifolia var. inermis Pulle; Erythrina patens Moc. & Sessé ex DC.

= Erythrina fusca =

Species of tree

Erythrina fusca is a species of flowering tree in the legume family, Fabaceae. It is known by many common names, including purple coraltree, gallito, bois immortelle, bucayo, and the more ambiguous "bucare" and "coral bean". E. fusca has the widest distribution of any Erythrina species; it is the only one found in both the New and Old World. It grows on coasts and along rivers in tropical Asia, Oceania, the Mascarene Islands, Madagascar, Africa, and the Neotropics.

The easy-to-grow and attractive flowering tree is cultivated as an ornamental shade and hedge plant. It is a common shade tree in cacao plantations. It attracts hummingbirds, which pollinate its flowers.

E. fusca is the official flower of the Venezuelan state of Trujillo.

== Description ==
E. fusca is a deciduous tree with spiny bark and light orange flowers. Its legume pods reach 20 centimetres (7.9 in) in length and contain dark brown seeds. The seeds are buoyant, allowing them disperse across oceans. The tree is highly adapted to coastal conditions, tolerant of both flooding and salinity.

Like many other species in the genus Erythrina, E. fusca contains toxic alkaloids which have been utilized for medicinal value but are poisonous in larger amounts. The most common alkaloid is erythraline, which is named for the genus.

== As food ==
The buds and leaves are eaten as a vegetable. In Thailand Erythrina fusca (Thai: ทองหลาง) leaves are often eaten in Miang kham (Thai: เมี่ยงคำ).
