= Red Boat =

Fish sauce brand

Red Boat is a brand of premium Phu Quoc fish sauce.

== History ==
The company was founded by Cuong Pham, who was born in Vietnam and grew up in Saigon. His family had a small fish sauce factory in Phu Quoc. Cuong emigrated to the United States in 1979 to join his siblings when he was 20, after having spent nine months in a refugee camp in Malaysia.

Dissatisfied with the Thai-style fish sauce available in the United States, which was more suited to Thai cuisine than to that of Vietnam, and dismayed when on a 2005 visit to Phu Quoc he discovered that artisanal producers were being forced to either cut down on production or produce lower-quality products, in 2006 Cuong returned to Vietnam and bought a friend's family-operated fish sauce barrel house in Phu Quoc. He incorporated in Milpitas, California, as Viet Phu in 2011.

Anhing logo

The first bottles were sold in 2011. Pham sold the first bottles from the back of an SUV to Asian supermarkets in California. He sent bottles to food influencers such as chefs and bloggers.

In 2014 the company won a trademark infringement suit that had been brought against it by Anhing, a California maker of fish sauce whose logo included the image of a red junk.

== Production ==
Anchovies used in production are salted on the fishing boat before being transported. The salt is locally harvested and is stored for several months before using to mellow its flavor. The anchovies are fermented with salt in a 3:1 ratio in large wooden barrels holding about 13 tons of anchovies each.

The company, as of 2024, had 85 12-ton barrels of salted anchovies fermenting at a time. Only the first pressings of the fermented anchovies are bottled as sauce. Final sauces are blended from various vats to achieve consistency in flavor across batches. The ingredients of the final sauces are black anchovies and local sea salt; no other ingredients are added.

The fermenting plant is located on a river; fishing boats unload their anchovies directly onto the dock.

== Distribution ==
As of 2024 the brand is only available in the United States. According to Saveur, this is "due in part to its significantly higher price point"; at the time a 17 US fl oz (500 ml) bottle of Red Boat cost approximately $13. According to Bloomberg News, Red Boat's prices are typically three or four times the price of mass-produced fish sauces.

== Products ==
Red Boat produces several fish sauces. The original version, which has a nitrogen level (°N) of 40, and a Phamily Reserve graded at 50°N, which according to Saveur has an intense umami flavor. At one time they produced a 35°N version. The company also creates custom blends for several chefs.

In addition to fish sauces, the company makes fish "salts", which are a dehydrated version of the sauces.

In 2021 Pham, Diep Tran, and Tien Nguyen released a cookbook, The Red Boat Fish Sauce Cookbook.

== Reception ==
In 2012 Food & Wine named it to their list of the year's 10 best products. America's Test Kitchen rated it the highest among the fish sauces they reviewed, crediting its high nitrogen grade for mellowing the saltiness typical of lower-protein fish sauces. Bloomberg News call the flavor "singular...less of a fish taste and more of a tantalizing funk like that of Iberico ham or Parmesan cheese", also crediting the higher nitrogen grade. German chef The Duc Ngo credits Red Boat for "generating a new global interest in fish sauce". According to the LA Times, Red Boat is "the darling of celebrity chefs". Sunset Magazine called Red Boat "the world's premier manufacturer of the essential Vietnamese condiment".

== See also ==
- List of fish sauces
- List of Vietnamese culinary specialities
