= Bún kèn =

Vietnamese soup of Khmer Krom origin

- Alternative names: Trumpet rice noodle soup
- Type: Soup
- Place of origin: Vietnam
- Region or state: Phú Quốc
- Created by: Khmer Krom
- Main ingredients: Rice vermicelli, coconut milk, kroeung, prahok, meat or fish, herbs and vegetables
- Similar dishes: num banhchok

Bún kèn (Khmer: ប៊៊ុនកែន, from Vietnamese: bún and Khmer: កែន, ken – 'dishes cooked with coconut milk'), also known as trumpet rice noodle soup, is a Vietnamese coconut-based noodle soup of Khmer Krom origin, a specialty dish of Phú Quốc.

The rice vermicelli at the base of the dish creates a chewy texture. Snakehead fish is usually used due to the brittle nature of its meat and lack of odor.

== See also ==
- Rice noodles
- List of Vietnamese culinary specialities
