= Miang kham =

Southeast Asian snack

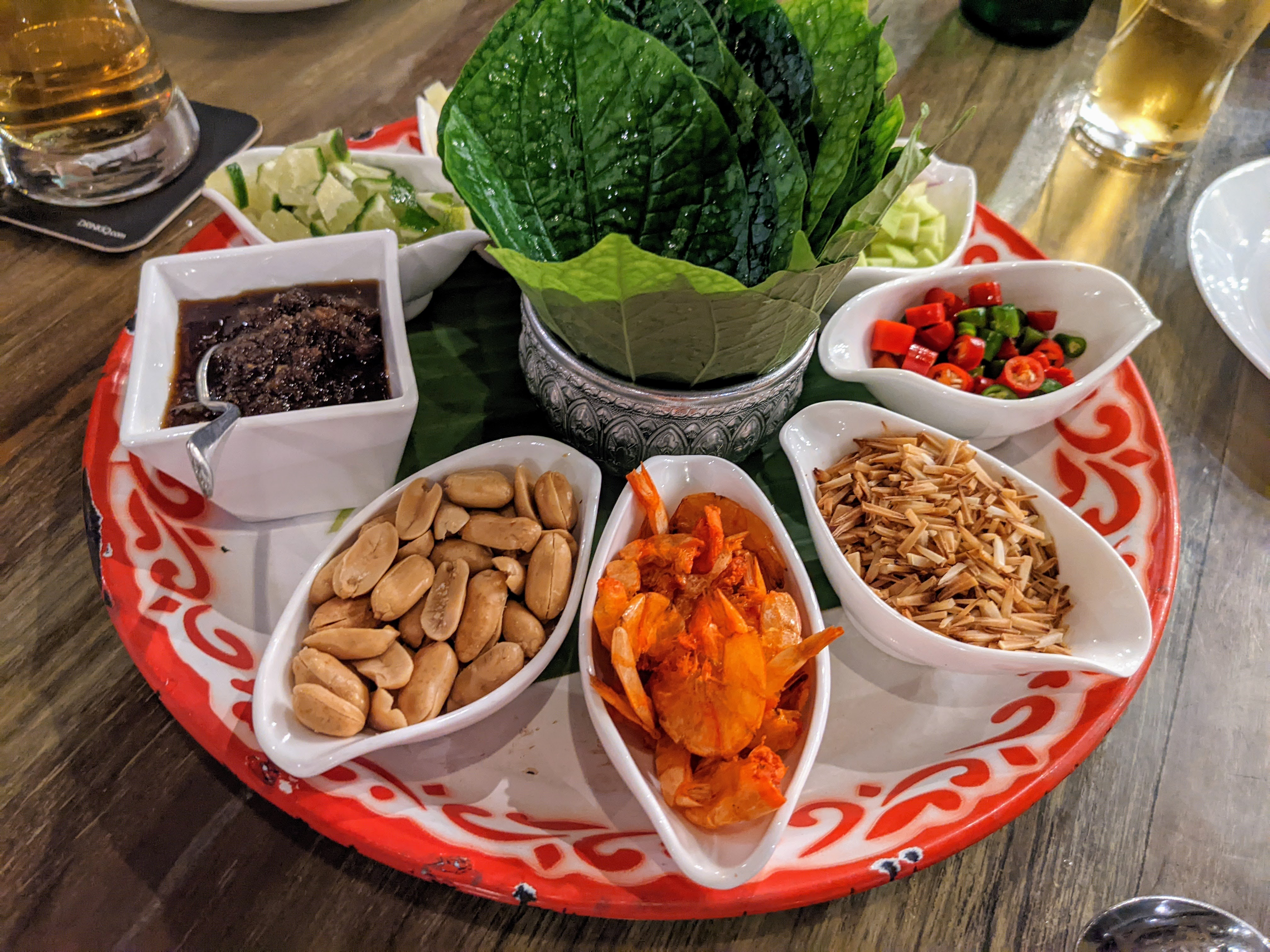
- A platter of Miang kham ingredients
- Type: Snack
- Place of origin: Mainland Southeast Asia
- Region or state: Thailand, Laos
- Associated cuisine: Thailand and Laos

Miang kham (Thai: เมี่ยงคำ, pronounced [mîaŋ kʰām]; Lao: ໝ້ຽງຄຳ, pronounced [mȉaŋ kʰám]; pronounced [mìaŋ kʰâm]; Lanna: ᨾ᩠᩶ᨿᨦᨤᩴᩣ, pronounced [mi᷇aŋ kʰām]) is a traditional Southeast Asian snack from Thailand and Laos. It was introduced to the Siamese court of King Rama V by Princess Dara Rasmi. In Laos, most people call it miang. The name miang kham translates to 'one bite wrap', from miang ('food wrapped in leaves') and kham ('a bite').

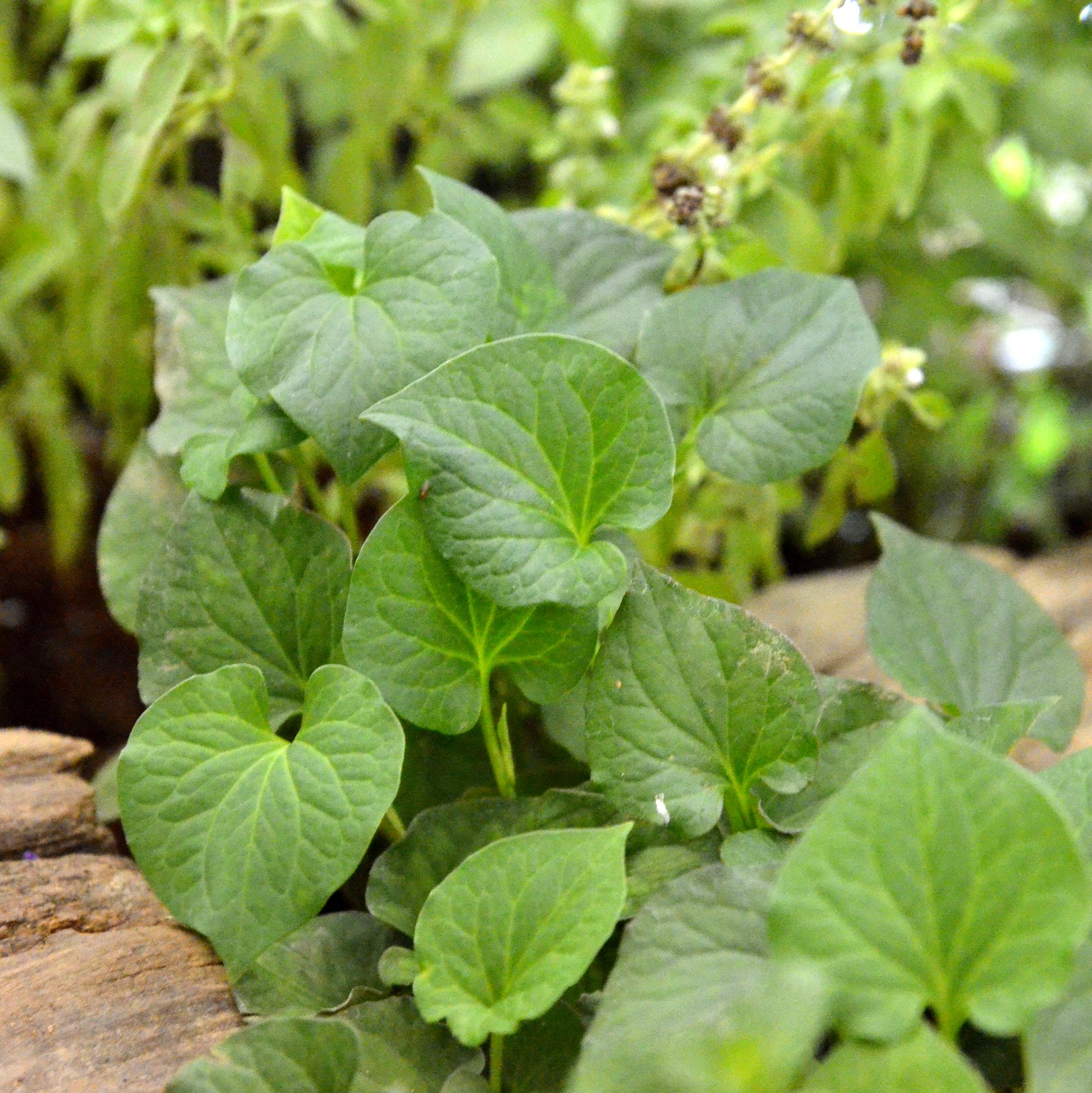
Chaphlu plant

== Ingredients ==
Miang kham mostly consists of raw fresh leaves of lolot pepper (Thai: ชะพลู, RTGS: chaphlu) or purple coraltree (Thai: ทองหลาง, RTGS: thonglang) that are filled with roasted coconut shavings and the following main ingredients chopped or cut into small pieces:

- Shallots
- Fresh red or green bird's eye chili peppers
- Ginger
- Garlic
- Key lime (Citrus × aurantiifolia), including the peel
- Chopped unsalted peanuts or cashew nuts
- Small dried shrimps

== Background information ==
Miang kham is a snack food that originated in the northern regions of Thailand, originally using pickled tea leaves (called miang in the northern Thai language). The dish is mentioned in Epic of the Verse of Foods, a book written by King Rama II. In Thailand, Miang kham is usually eaten with family and friends. It is also popular in the Central Region of Thailand. This dish is mostly eaten during the raining season for it is then that cha phlu leaves are abundantly available, as it grows new leaves and shoots.

Before wrapping the filled leaves are topped with palm syrup or sugar cane syrup which often has been cooked with lemongrass, galangal, ginger and fish sauce.

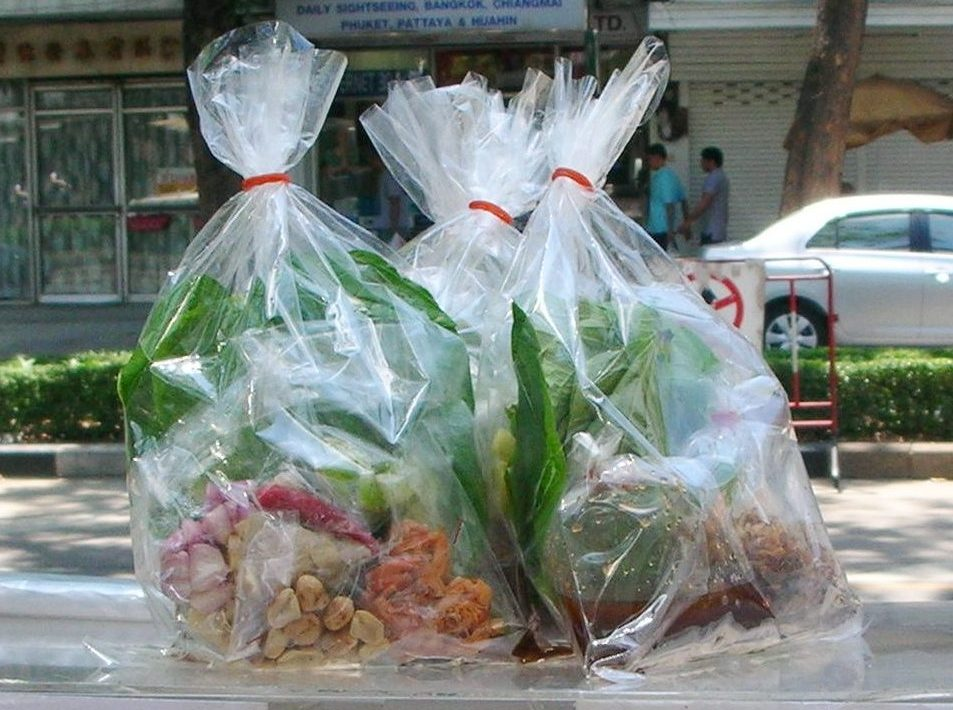
Miang kham bags for sale in Bangkok.

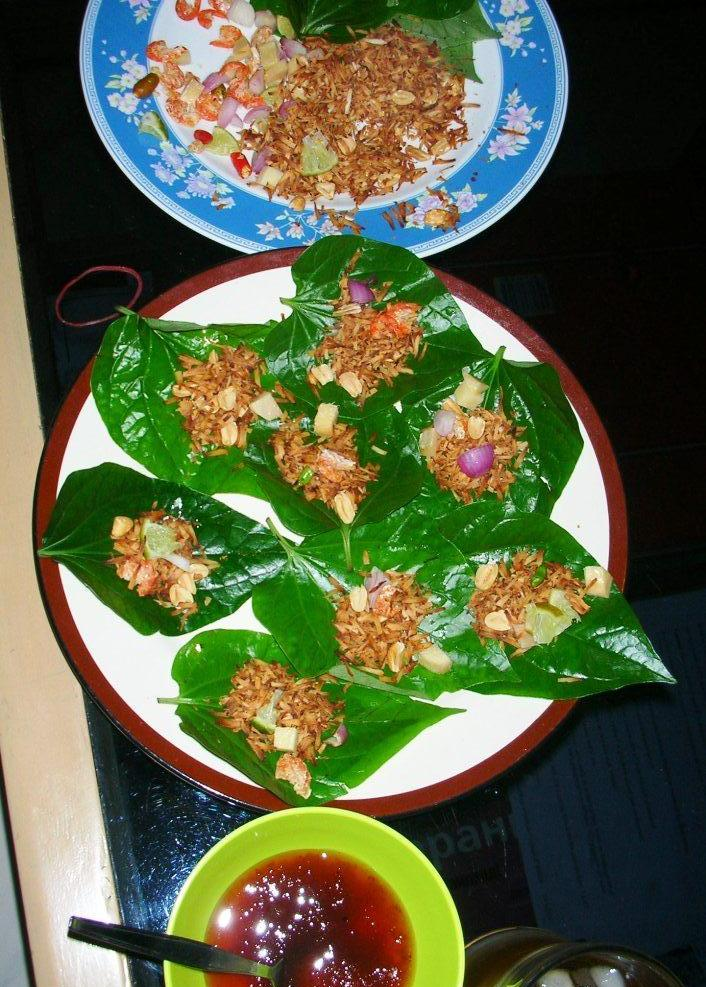
Miang Kham, assembled but not wrapped

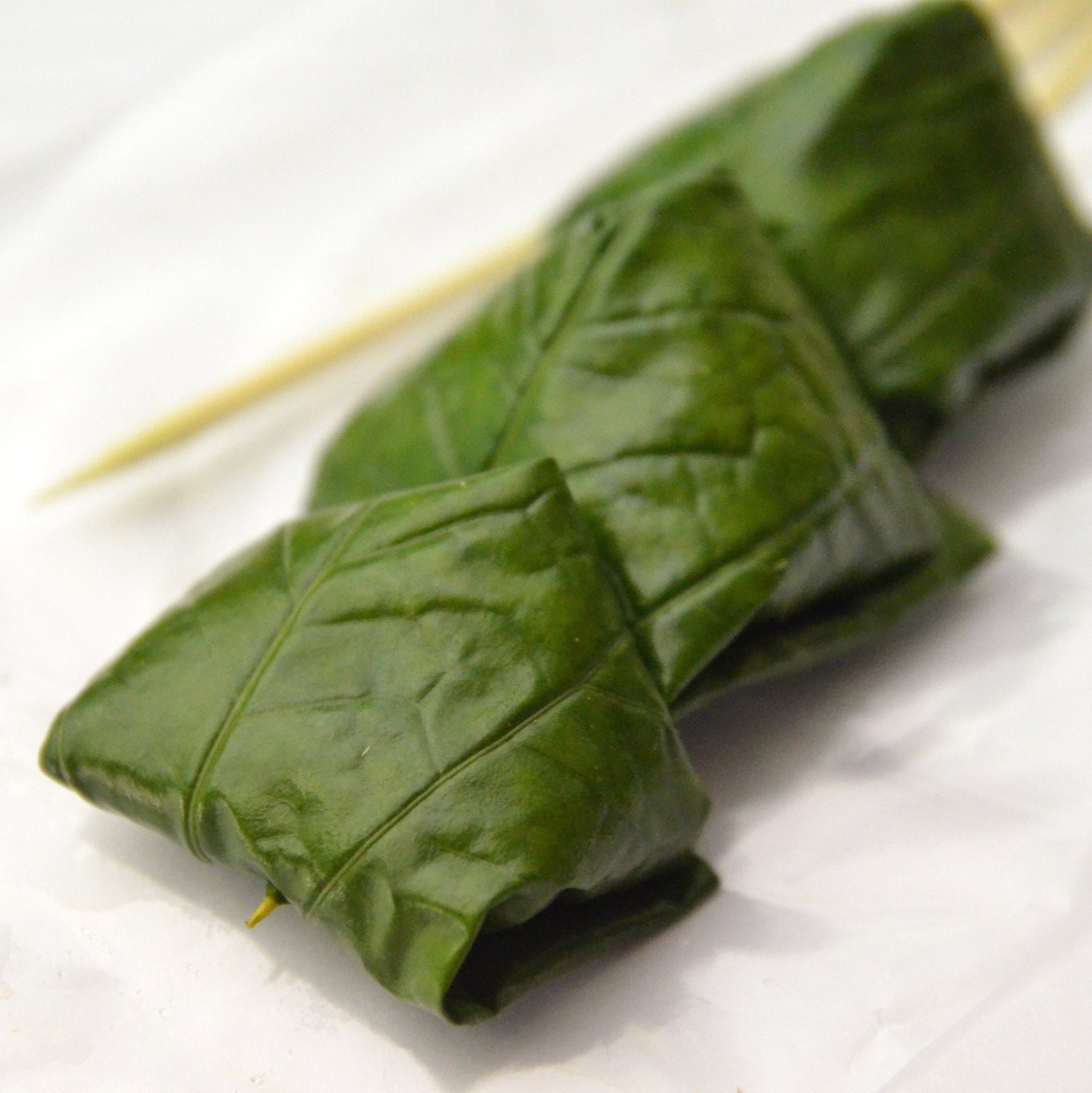
Wrapped Miang kham

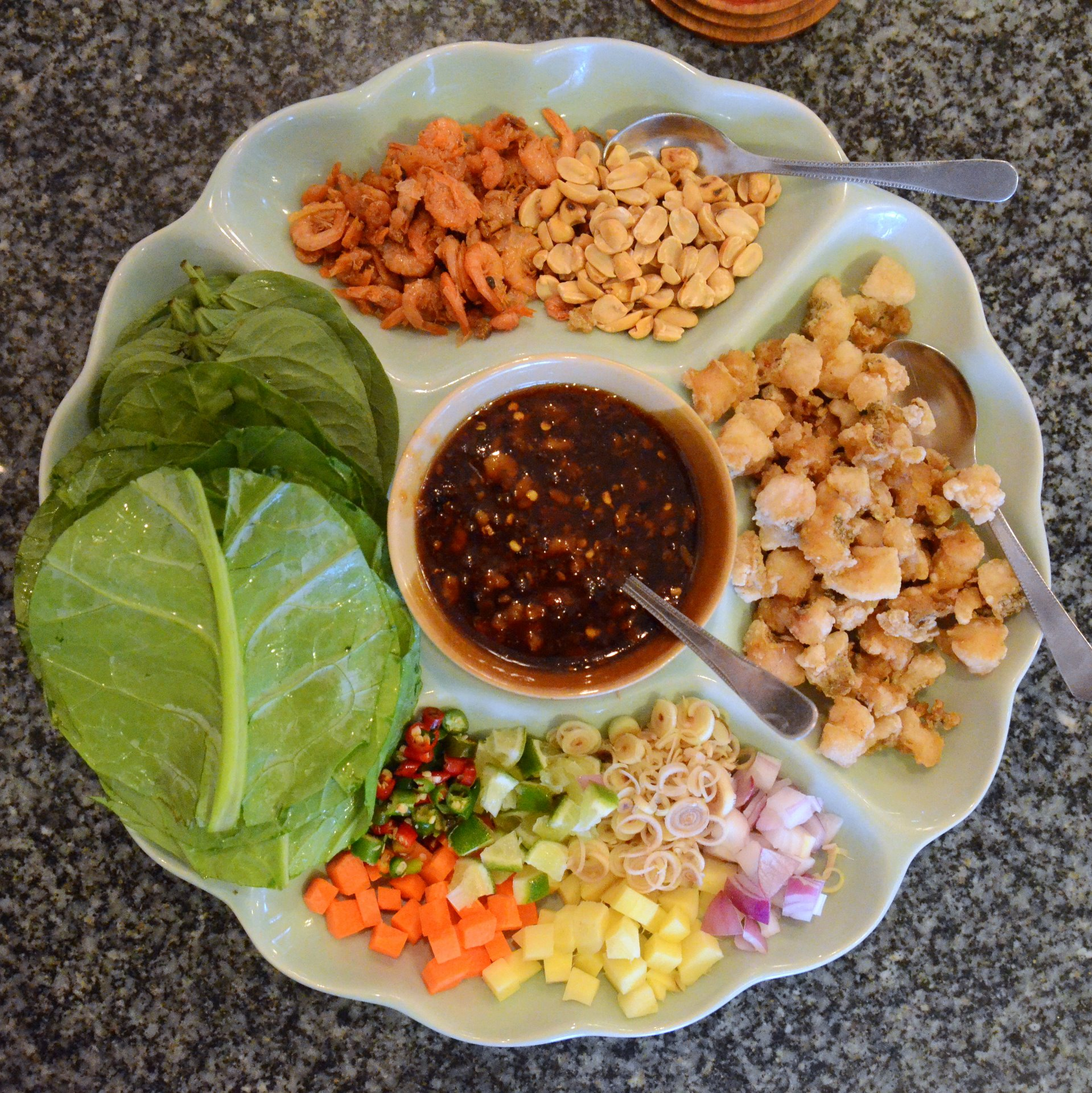
Miang pla, with Chinese broccoli leaves

== Variants ==
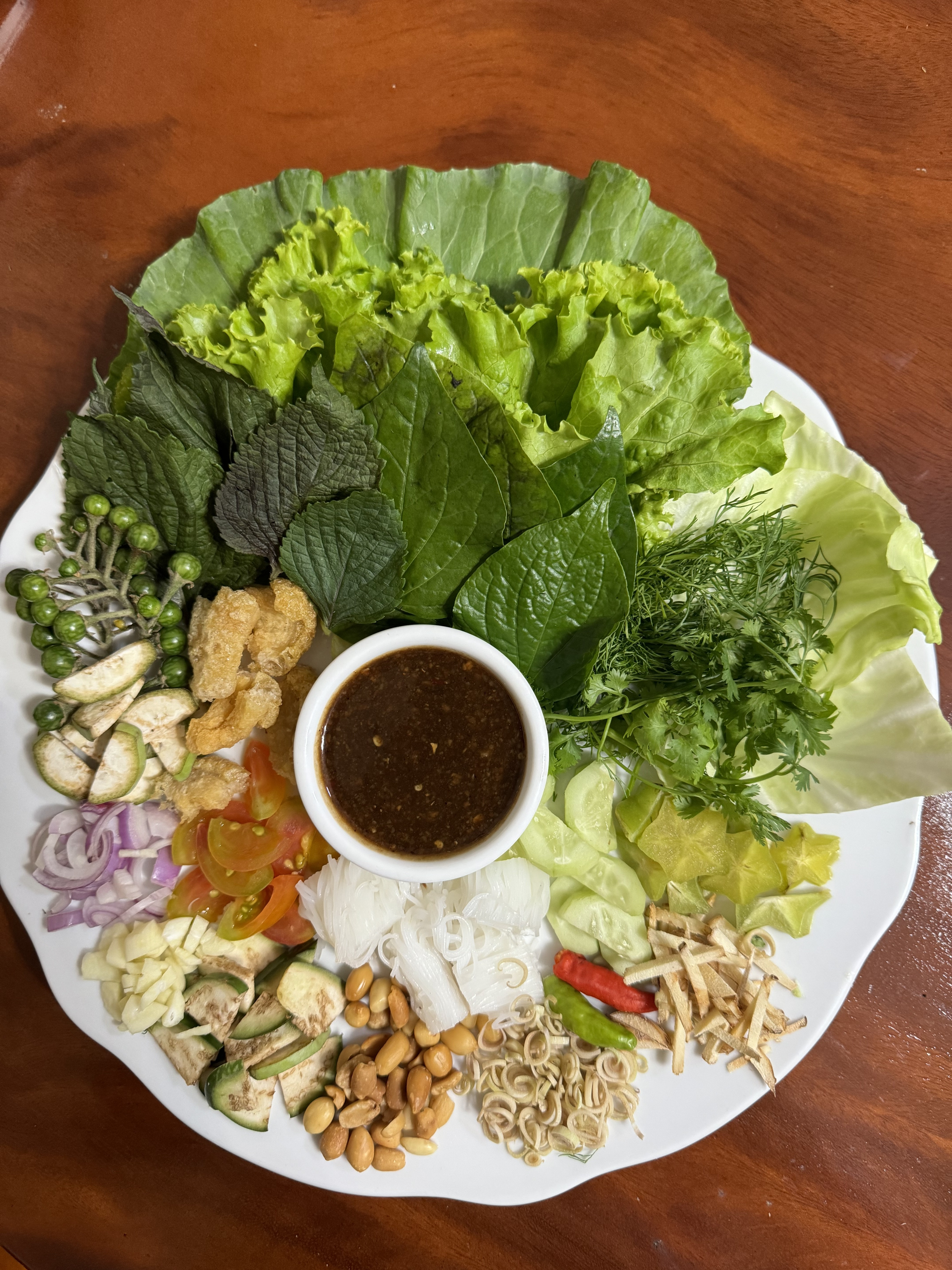
Miang Lao uses a variety of leaf types for wrapping, vegetables and spices, and dipping sauces

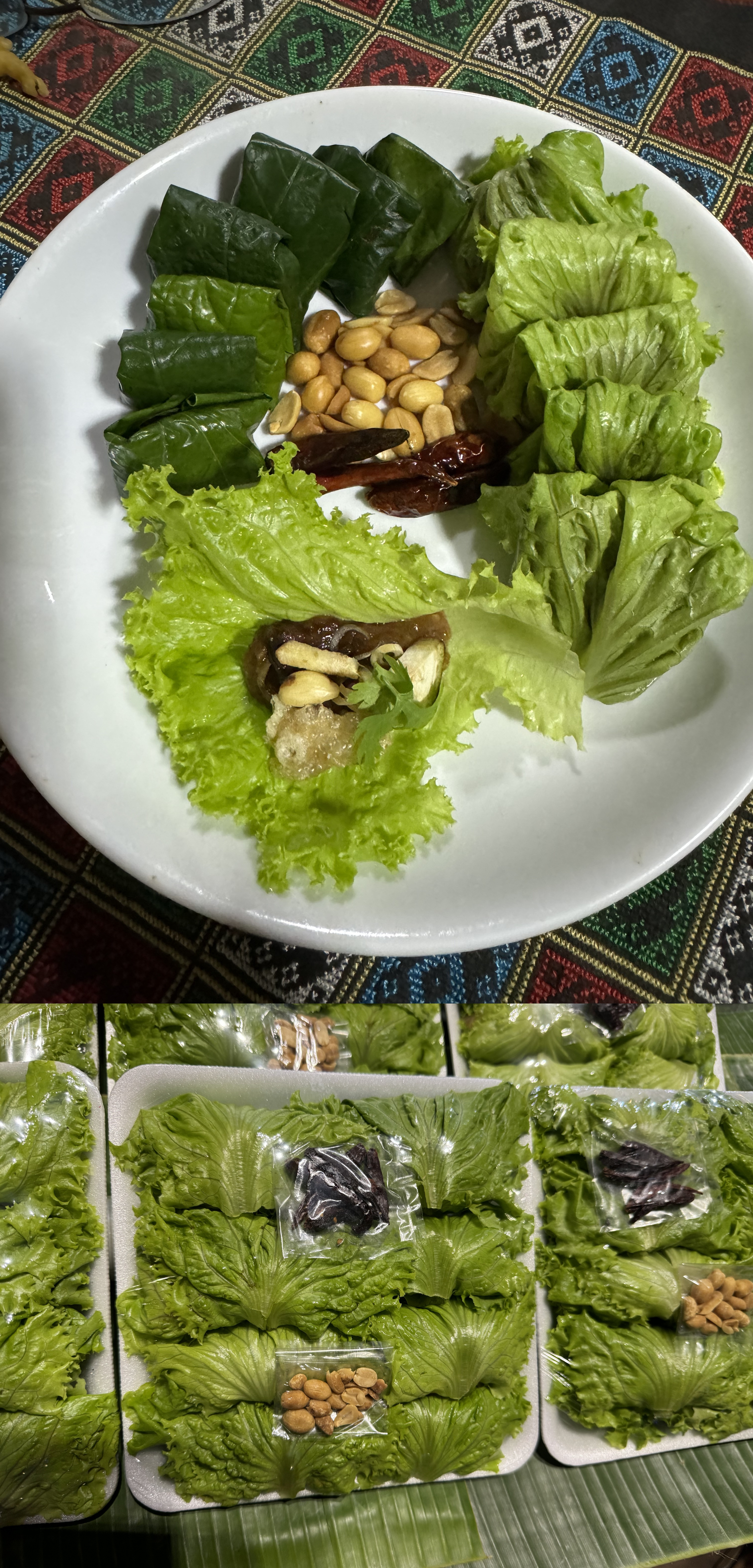
Miang Luang Prabang wrapped in lolot leaf or lettuce (top) for sale in Vientiane, Laos (bottom)

In Laos, Miang kham is called Miang. Although a variety of Miang exists throughout the country, there are two popular main types: Miang Lao (or Miang Padaek) and Miang Luang Prabang (or Miang khao). Miang Lao uses dipping sauces made with fermented fish sauce (Padaek), or pieces of the fermented fish, which provide an intense flavor. There are a selection of vegetables, herbs and spices, and types of leaves used for wrapping, including lolot leaves, Chinese kale, lettuce, cabbage, spinach and perilla leaves. In some regions, Miang is often folded in cooked cabbage leaves (Lao: ກະລໍ່າປີ kaalampii).

Miang Luang Prabang uses sticky rice paste in the place of dipping sauces. The paste is prepared by blending sticky rice puffs using a food processor and rehydrating the rice with a flavoring broth. The rice paste is spooned and wrapped together with vegetables, herbs and spices in a lolot leaf or lettuce, and served. Alternatively, for simplicity some people choose to pre-mix some of the herbs and spices with the rice paste during the blending process. This Lao snack is sold during festivals, in markets and on roadsides in Laos. Miang can be tailored into a meal, for instance, by including grilled fish meat and Lao rice vermicelli (sen Khao poon) among the ingredients.

A variation called miang pla includes pieces of deep-fried fish in addition to the standard ingredients.

- In Thai royal cuisine in the central part of Thailand, have an alternate of wrap that adept the dish to represent of beautiful and social status e.g. Miang Kreep Bua or Miang Kham Bua Lhuang

Miang Kham Bua Lhuang (Thai: เมี่ยงคำบัวหลวง), originated in Thai royal cuisine in the central part of Thailand, uses lotus petal for wrapping..

== See also ==
- Betel nut chewing
