= Kaeng khae =

Northern Thai curry

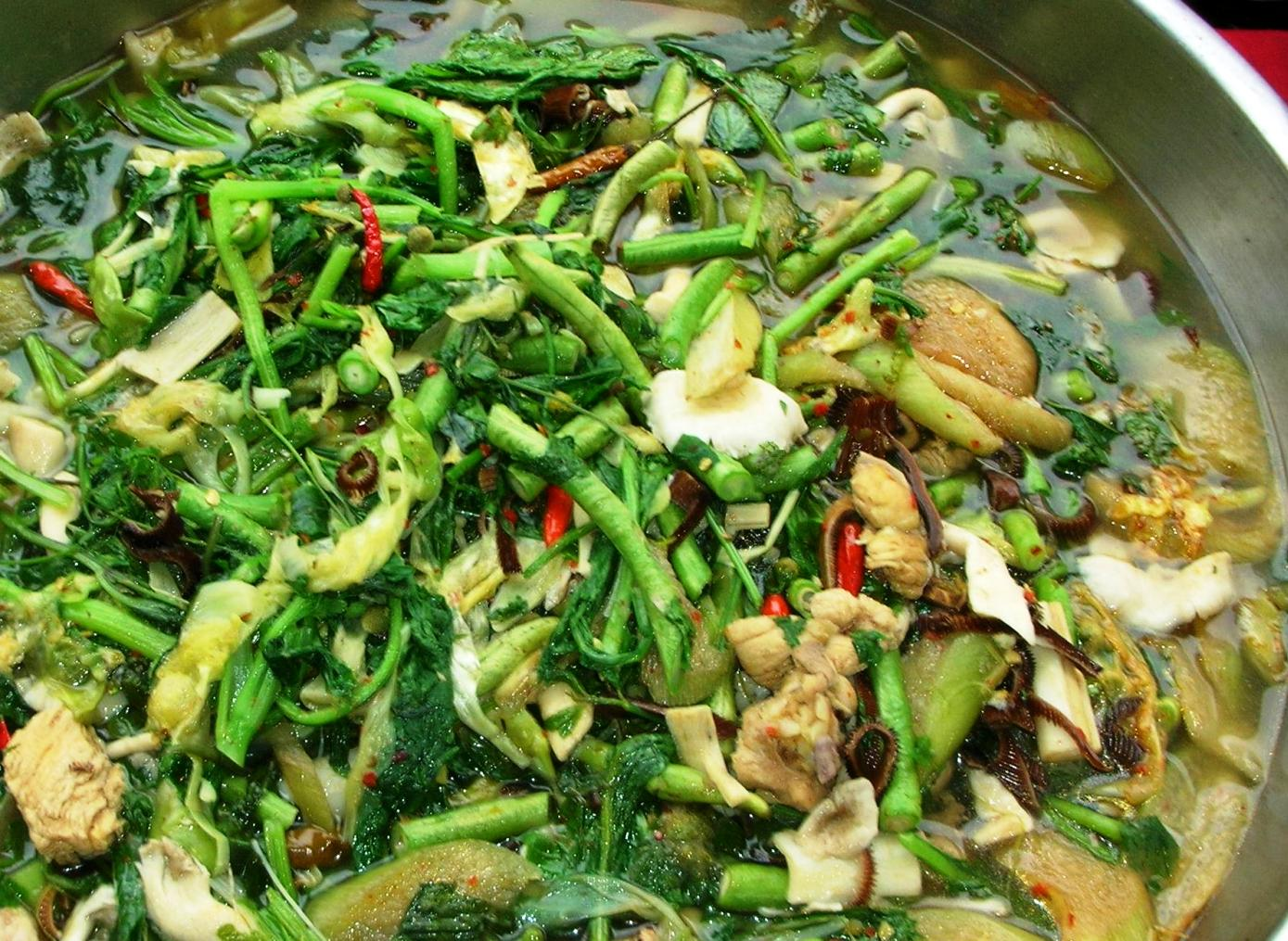
- Kaeng khae with chicken and yardlong beans in Chiang Rai city
- Alternative names: Gaeng kae
- Type: Curry
- Place of origin: Thailand
- Region or state: Southeast Asia
- Associated cuisine: Thailand
- Created by: Northern Thai cuisine
- Serving temperature: Hot
- Main ingredients: Vegetables, chicken, frog, fish or snails

Kaeng khae (Thai: แกงแค, pronounced [kɛ̄ːŋ kʰɛ̄ː]; Northern Thai: แก๋งแค, pronounced [kɛ̌ːŋ kʰɛ̄ː]) is a curry of northern Thai cuisine.

The curry is named after the Piper sarmentosum leaves, one of its main ingredients, which are known as phak khae in northern Thailand.

== Ingredients ==
This curry is made mainly with vegetables and herbs. Chicken, frogs, beef, dried fish or snails are added depending on the variant.

The ingredients of the dish are P. sarmentosum, Lao coriander, cha-om, and Acmella oleracea leaves, the dry cores of the Bombax ceiba flower, Sesbania grandiflora flowers, ivy gourds, eggplants, bamboo shoots, pea eggplants, fresh chilies, and mushrooms.

Khua khae is a curry that is similar to kaeng khae, but less liquid.

== See also ==
- List of Thai dishes
- Thai curry
