= Ốc vú nàng =

Vietnamese shellfish-based culinary specialty

- Type: Seafood
- Place of origin: Vietnam
- Region or state: Côn Đảo district, Ho Chi Minh City
- Associated cuisine: Vietnamese cuisine
- Main ingredients: Breast snail

Ốc vú nàng is a Vietnamese shellfish-based culinary specialty from Ho Chi Minh City.

== Composition ==
The snails (almost always breast snail) is washed, folded into a pot, and boiled. They are then pried open and watered once with more boiling water. The snails are typically eaten with salt, pepper, lemon, and chili pepper.

== Salad ốc vú ==
Breast snail salad is also a popular delicacy. The snail meat is sliced lengthwise into thin strips, and mixed with thin-sliced pork skin, pork belly, cucumber, basil, peanut, lemon, chili pepper, and Vietnamese coriander.
