= Phu Quoc fish sauce =

Vietnamese fish sauce

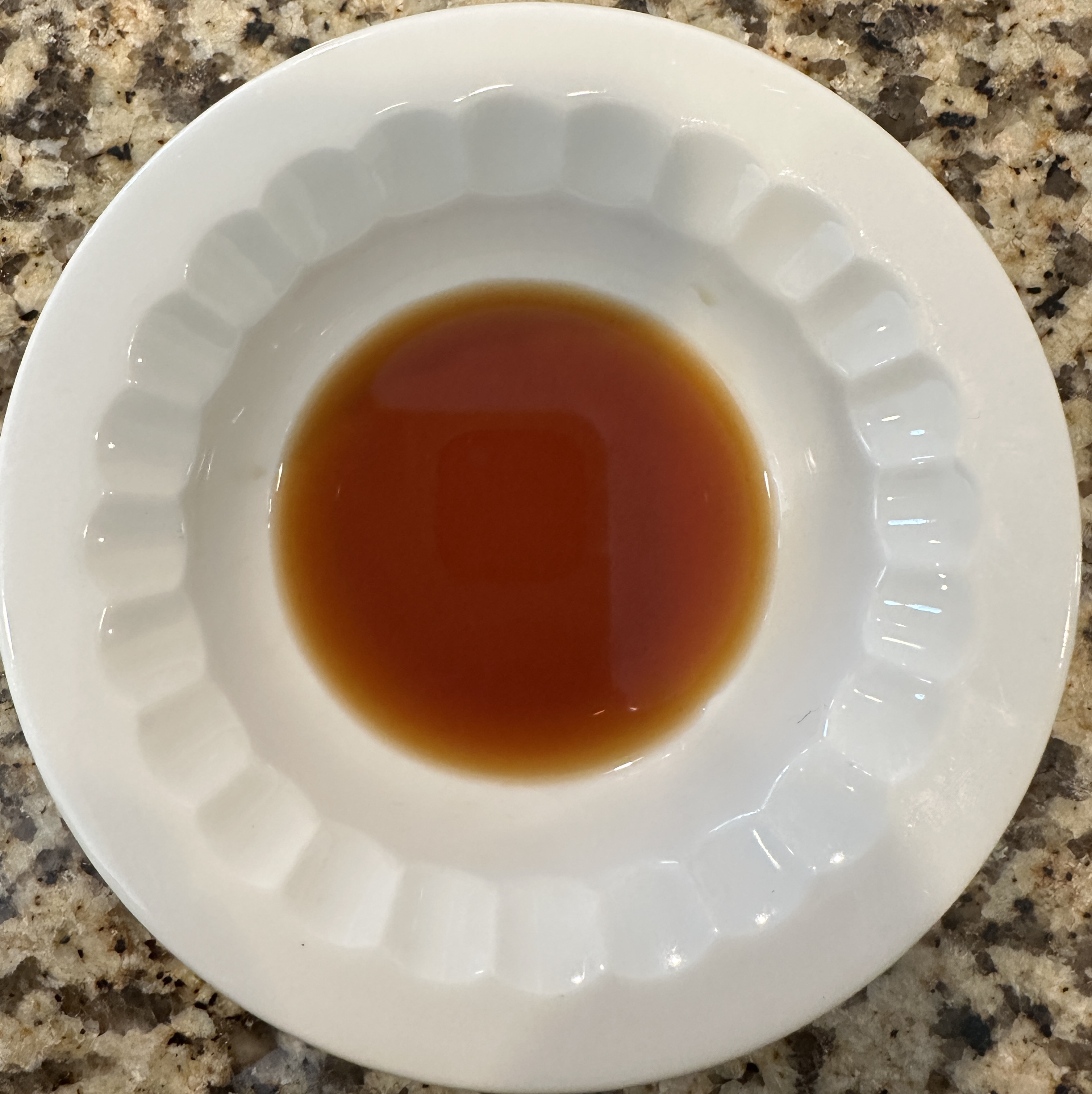
- Phu Quoc fish sauce
- Type: condiment, ingredient
- Place of origin: Vietnam
- Main ingredients: Anchovy, salt

Phu Quoc fish sauce is a variety of fish sauce in Vietnamese cuisine made from fermented black anchovies. It is produced in Phu Quoc island in southwest Vietnam and the 21 islets surrounding it. Traditional production dates back centuries.

Since 2001, the Industrial Property Department of the government of Vietnam has the name "Phu Quoc Fish Sauce" as a trademark, and only registered manufacturers are allowed to use the name in Vietnam. In 2012, Phu Quoc fish sauce was granted a European Union Protected Designation of Origin (PDO) status, the first Southeast Asian food to be recognized.

== Background ==
The concept of dac san ("specialty"), similar to that of the French concept of terroir, has been recognized in Vietnam for centuries: that certain areas, because of their climate, geography, available raw ingredients, and human inputs such as production method, produce foods and beverages that are recognizably different from and/or superior to those made in other places. According to Cuong Pham, the crucial factors for producing Pho Quoc fish sauce are the locally fished black anchovy, the salting process, and the humid climate of the area. Other Vietnames dac san products include Buon Ma Thuot coffee, Hải Dương mung beans, Lý Sơn garlic, Ninh Thuân grapes, and Thai Nguyen tea.

Traditional Phu Quoc fish sauce has been made solely out of fermented black anchovies, also known as ca com anchovies, salt, and water for "centuries". The waters around the islands are rich in seaweed and plankton which provide food for the anchovy population. However, it is only since the late 1950s that the product has been recognized outside of its home island, reaching its zenith of popularity between 1965 and 1975. With increasing government subsidies of many industries in the period from 1975 to 1985, the local fish sauce craft lost market share to larger competitors, but later the popularity of the Phu Quoc-produced traditional product rebounded.

As of 2021 Phu Quoc fish sauce production was expected to average 12 million liters/year.

== Production ==
=== Traditional production ===
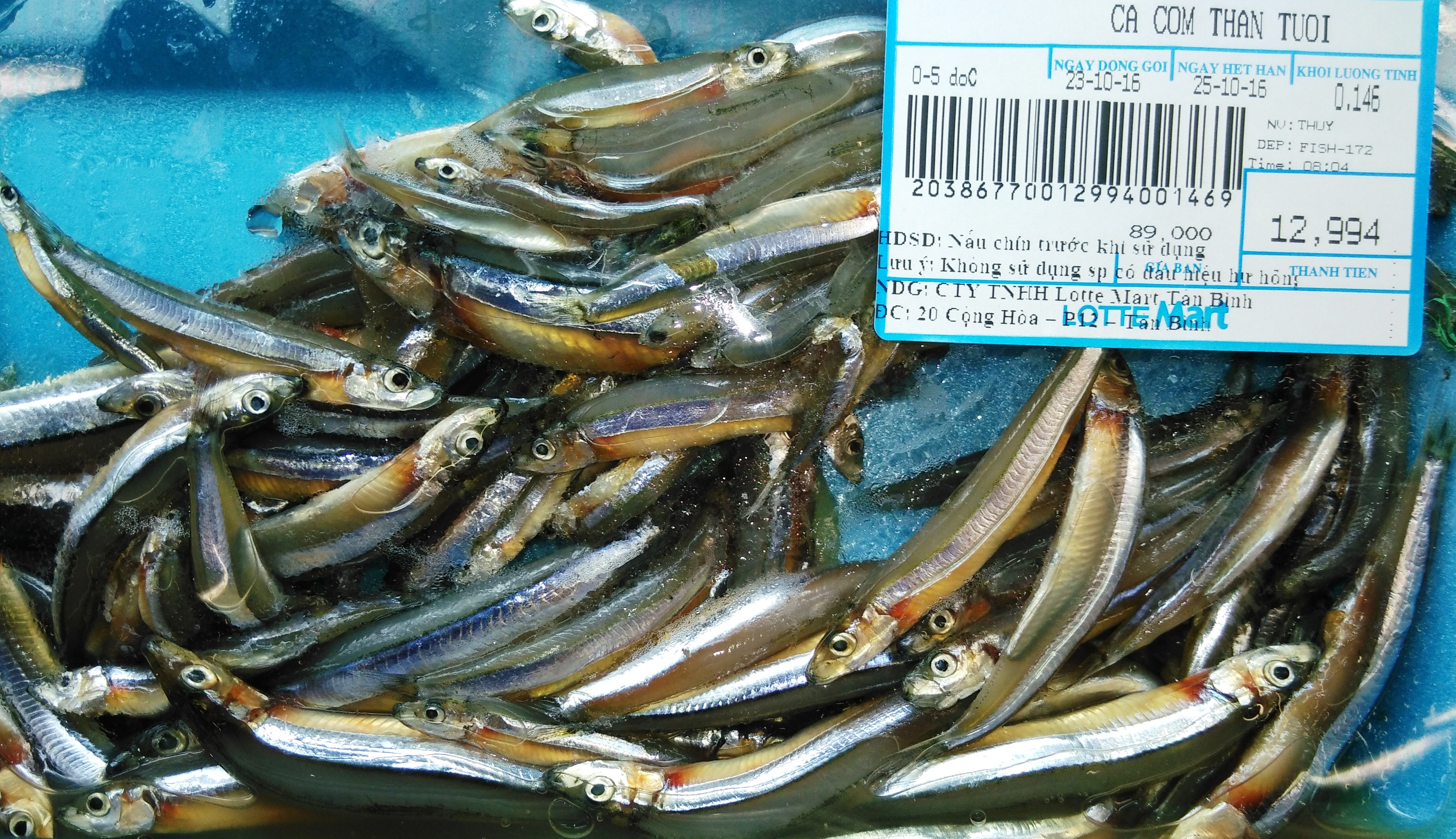
Ca com or black anchovies

The making of fish sauce in Vietnam dates back centuries. The sauce was traditionally made at home with anchovies which were too small to use in cooking, often by fishermen's or fishmongers' wives and daughters as a way to use less-salable portions of a day's catch.

The traditional method uses salt that has been stored for at least two years to enhance its taste, then packed with the anchovies and salt in a ratio of one part salt to three parts anchovies (in areas with climates different than that of Phu Quoc, the ratio might be 4:1) into wooden barrels or clay jars with a tap at the bottom. They are allowed to ferment for a year or more in the sun, with liquid removed from the bottom through the tap and poured back over the top every day to filter through again, ensuring an even distribution of ingredients. After the fermentation is complete, the contents of the barrels are pressed, drained through the tap, and filtered into jars. The first pressing is known as nuoc mam nhi; according to producer Cuong Pham, this first pressing often is not sold but is kept by the producer for their own use and to gift to family and friends.

Traditionally small family producers kept the initial press for their own use and sold the later presses.

=== Modern production ===
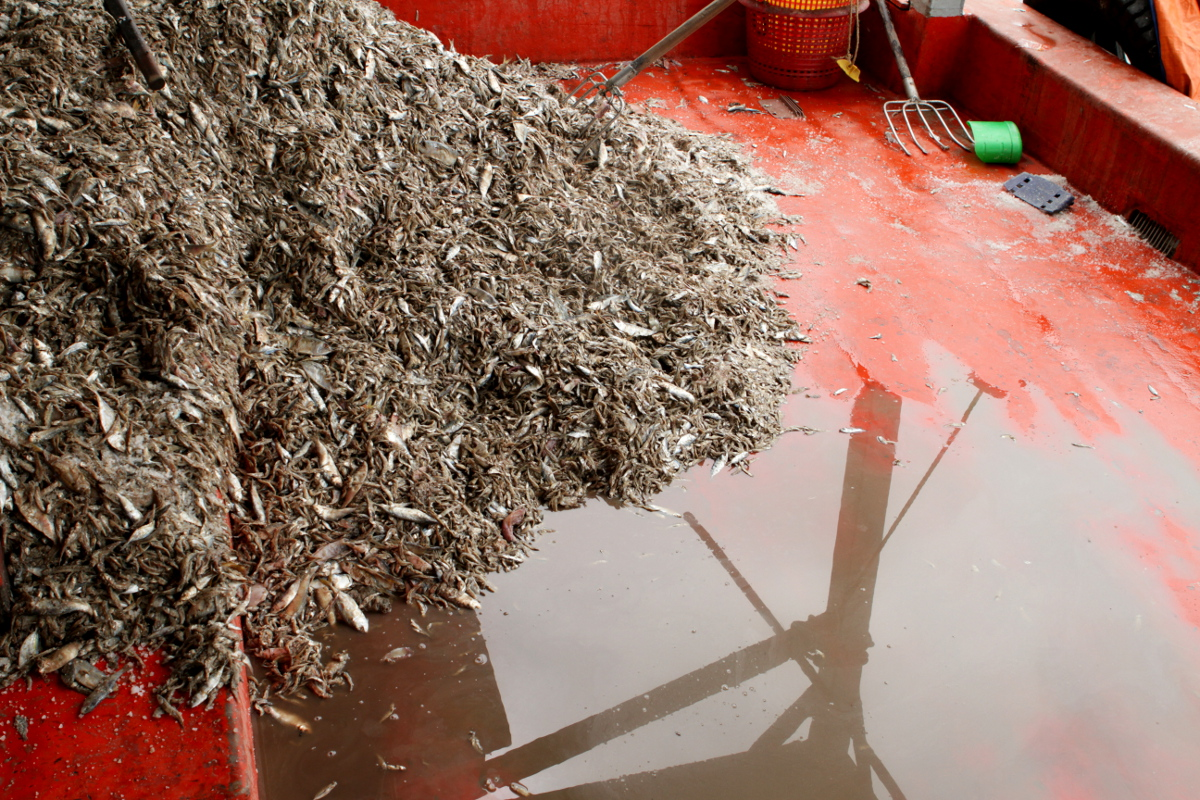
Salted anchovies at a Phu Quoc factory

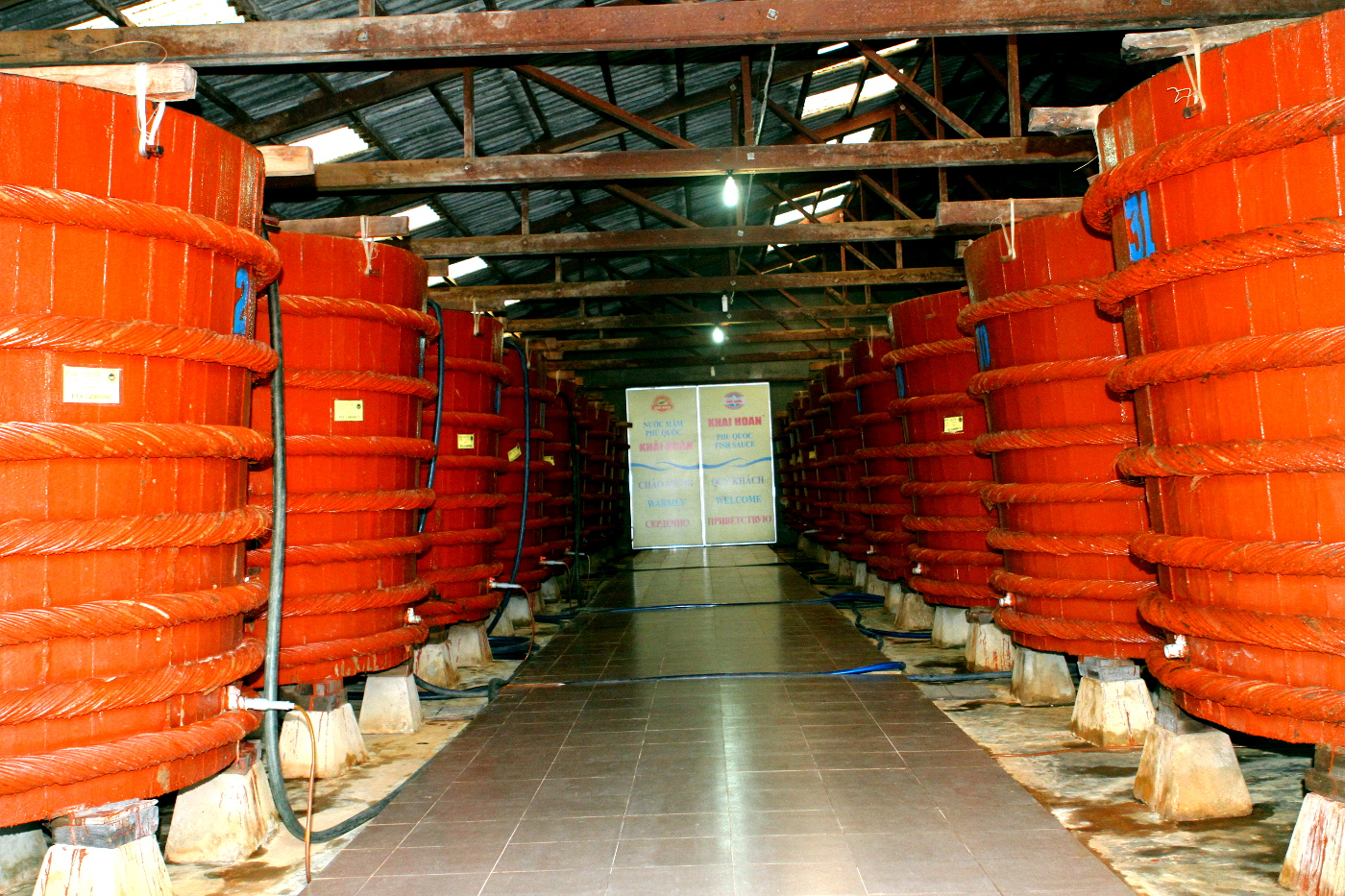
Barrels at a Phu Quoc fish sauce factory

Phu Quoc fish sauce is made from anchovies that have been fermented in brine in large barrels measuring 1.5 to 3 metres (4.9 to 9.8 ft) in diameter and 2 to 4 metres (6.6 to 13.1 ft) in height, containing 7 to 13 tons of product. The barrels are made from braided rattan from the local mountains, and can be used for up to 60 years; as the barrels age they produce better sauce.

Traditionally and since 2012 by law, Phu Quoc sauce is made exclusively from anchovies harvested from waters surrounding the island. During the fishing season (which extends from July to December), fishermen harvest anchovies by net, removing the anchovies from among other fish and items in the nets, and immediately salting them on board, combining them with salt at a 3:1 ratio, then transporting them to the docks where they are placed into the barrels.

Barrels are fermented for six to twelve months before bottling; longer fermentation mellows the flavor and produces a higher-quality sauce. Barrels are drained to form the first press, which is used to make the highest-quality sauce. Artisanal products typically use only the first pressing, and the products contain only anchovy and salt.

Large-scale producers add salt and water to the drained barrels and drain them a second and third time. Many commercial producers typically add flavor enhancers, thickeners, preservatives, and coloring to these later pressings.

== Description ==
Phu Quoc fish sauce is differentiated by its color, which in traditionally-made products is due entirely to the ingredients and barrels rather than coloring agents. Higher-quality sauces have a reddish cast from amber to deep caramel. Phu Quoc fish sauce is generally lighter and sweeter than other fish sauces.

The highest quality sauces have a high nitrogen level (°N), which represents grams of nitrogen per liter, or the ratio of protein to liquid in the sauce; 30°N is a high-quality grade and 40°N is a premium grade. According to America's Test Kitchen, a higher protein ratio mellows the saltiness. Many commercial varieties have a grade in the mid-twenties.

== Recognition ==
According to Saveur, "what Provence is to rosé, Phú Quốc is to [fish sauce]". According to Epicurious, Phu Quoc "is considered to be...some of the world's highest quality fish sauce".

According to The Atlantic, Phu Quoc fish sauce is one of Vietnam's few dac san, or specialty product, branding successes.

Since 2001, the Industrial Property Department of the government of Vietnam has the name "Phu Quoc Fish Sauce" as a trademark, and only registered manufacturers are allowed to use the name in Vietnam.

In 2012, Phu Quoc fish sauce was granted a European Union Protected Designation of Origin status, which means only products produced in the islands can be labeled as Phu Quoc fish sauce. It was the first food from Southeast Asia to receive the PDO status.

In 2021, Vietnam's Ministry of Culture, Sports and Tourism recognised the traditional making of Phu Quoc fish sauce as a national intangible cultural heritage

== Issues ==
Phu Quoc fish sauce production is threatened by the declining anchovy population caused by overfishing and other environmental degradation.

Lesser-quality products used the name prior to the establishment of the trademark protection and PDO status. Trademark protection has been denied in some foreign countries due to overuse of the term by other manufacturers prior to the Phu Quoc producers' efforts to obtain trademark protection.

After the 2012 PDO status, counterfeiting became common. According to Phu Quoc Fish Sauce Association chairwoman Nguyen Thi Tinh speaking in 2014, eighty percent of fish sauce labeled “Phu Quoc" was counterfeit. Counterfeit fish sauces can be made and sold more cheaply.

== Notable producers ==
- Red Boat, the most widely-known Phu Quoc fish sauce in the US

== In popular culture ==
The protagonist of Viet Thanh Nguyen's 2015 The Sympathizer speaks of missing the sauce after emigrating: "Oh, fish sauce! How we missed it, dear Aunt, how nothing tasted right without it, how we longed for the grand cru of Phú Quốc Island and its vats brimming with the finest vintage of pressed anchovies!"

== See also ==
- List of fish sauces
