= Bò 7 món =

Set selection of beef dishes

Bò 7 món, literally "seven courses of beef"

Bò bảy món, on menus often "Bò 7 món" (lit. 'seven courses of beef' in Vietnamese) is a set selection of beef dishes in Vietnamese cuisine. Multi-course meals such as Bò 7 món are representative of higher-end Vietnamese cuisine.

== Overview ==
Typically the seven dishes, from first to the last course, are:

1. Bò bít tết: Beefsteak, thinly sliced, served with lettuce and tomato
2. Bò nướng sa tế: raw beef slices marinated in lemongrass to be cooked on grill
3. Bò nhúng dấm: Raw slices of beef to be cooked in a vinegared fondue
4. Bò nướng mỡ chài: Sausages made from grilled ground beef wrapped in caul fat casing
5. Bò lá lốt: Grilled ground beef wrapped in a Lolot leaf (very similar to a grape leaf in taste)
6. Bò chả đùm: Steamed ground beef patties served with shrimp chips
7. Cháo Bò: Beef congee

The cooked beef portions are then wrapped (by the individual eating it) with rice paper, a variety of herbs (rau thơm'), lettuce, cucumbers, and carrots and then dipped in mắm nêm. This slightly chunky sauce is made with anchovies and has a sweet and tangy flavor, due to the pineapple that is often added to achieve sweetness. This sauce is much more pungent in flavor than its cousin, nước mắm (fish sauce), and is not homogenized, allowing the textures of the original ingredients to characterize the sauce. A similar but less popular multi-course meal is the Cá 7 Món (literally "seven courses of fish").

== See also ==
- Full course dinner
- List of beef dishes
- Vietnamese cuisine
