= Chạo tôm =

Traditional Vietnamese dish

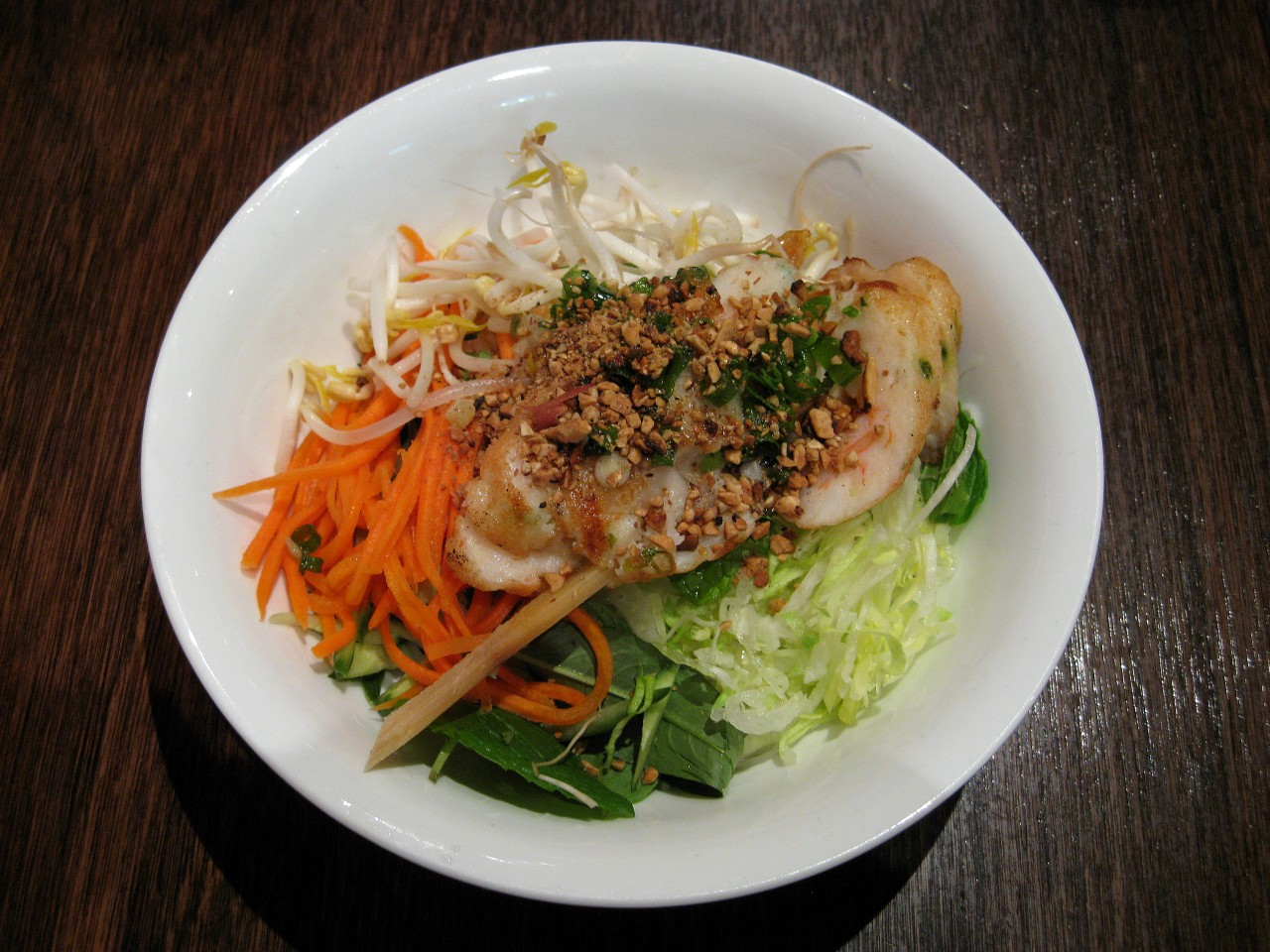
- Chạo tôm with bún (rice vermicelli), mung beans, shredded carrot and lettuce, mint, and crushed peanuts
- Place of origin: Vietnam
- Region or state: Huế region of Central Vietnam
- Main ingredients: Bún (rice vermicelli), mung beans, shredded carrot and lettuce, mint, and crushed peanuts

Chạo tôm is a traditional Vietnamese dish that comes from the Huế region of Central Vietnam. It consists of shrimp surimi grilled on a sugar cane stick. It is often presented as a dish during large banquets prepared for weddings, holidays, or similar special events.

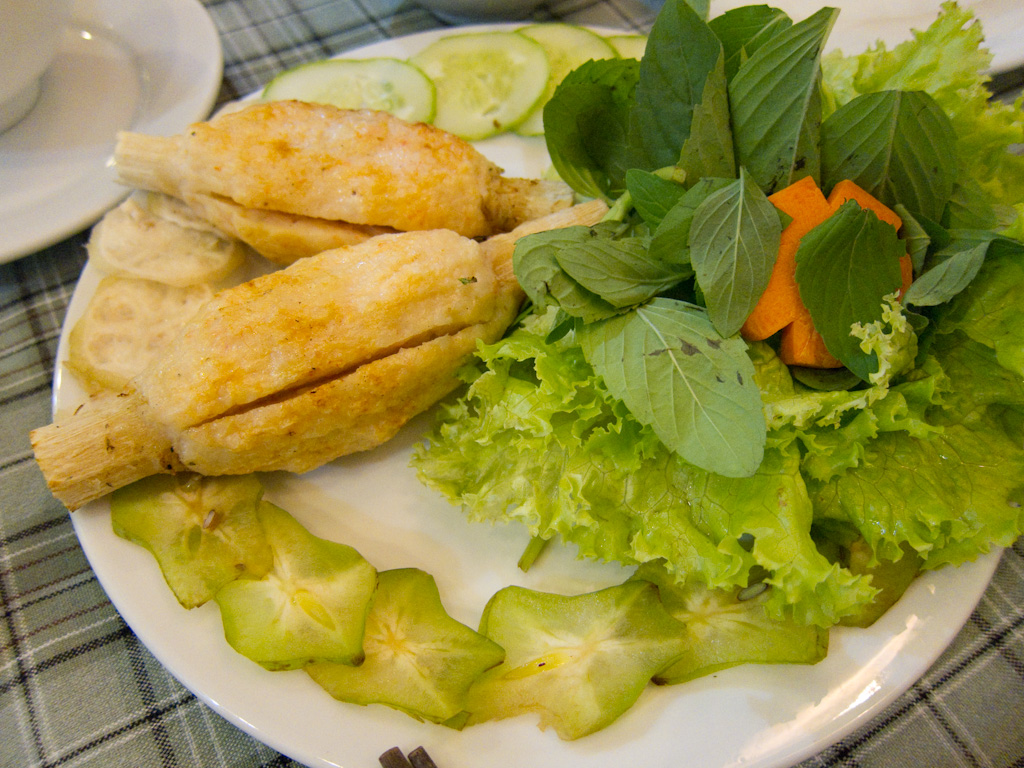
Chạo tôm

== See also ==
- List of seafood dishes
