= Khô cá lóc =

Vietnamese seafood dish

Khô cá lóc đồng
- Type: Seafood
- Place of origin: Vietnam
- Associated cuisine: Vietnamese cuisine
- Main ingredients: Snakehead fish
- Ingredients generally used: salt, glutamate flavoring, pepper, rice, salad
- Similar dishes: Chả cá Lã Vọng

Khô cá lóc đồng is a Vietnamese fish-based dish. It is culinary specialty in the An Giang province.

== Composition ==
The fish (almost always snakehead fish) is spiced with salt, glutamate flavoring, and pepper. Then, chili peppers are added and the fish is left to dry for 3–4 days. The dish is usually eaten with beer or wine. It is also put on top of rice or salad.
