= Ceylon spinach =

Ceylon spinach is a common name for several plants and may refer to:

- Basella alba, native to tropical Asia and Africa
- Talinum fruticosum
