= Little Saigon, Orange County =

Little Saigon
- Neighborhood
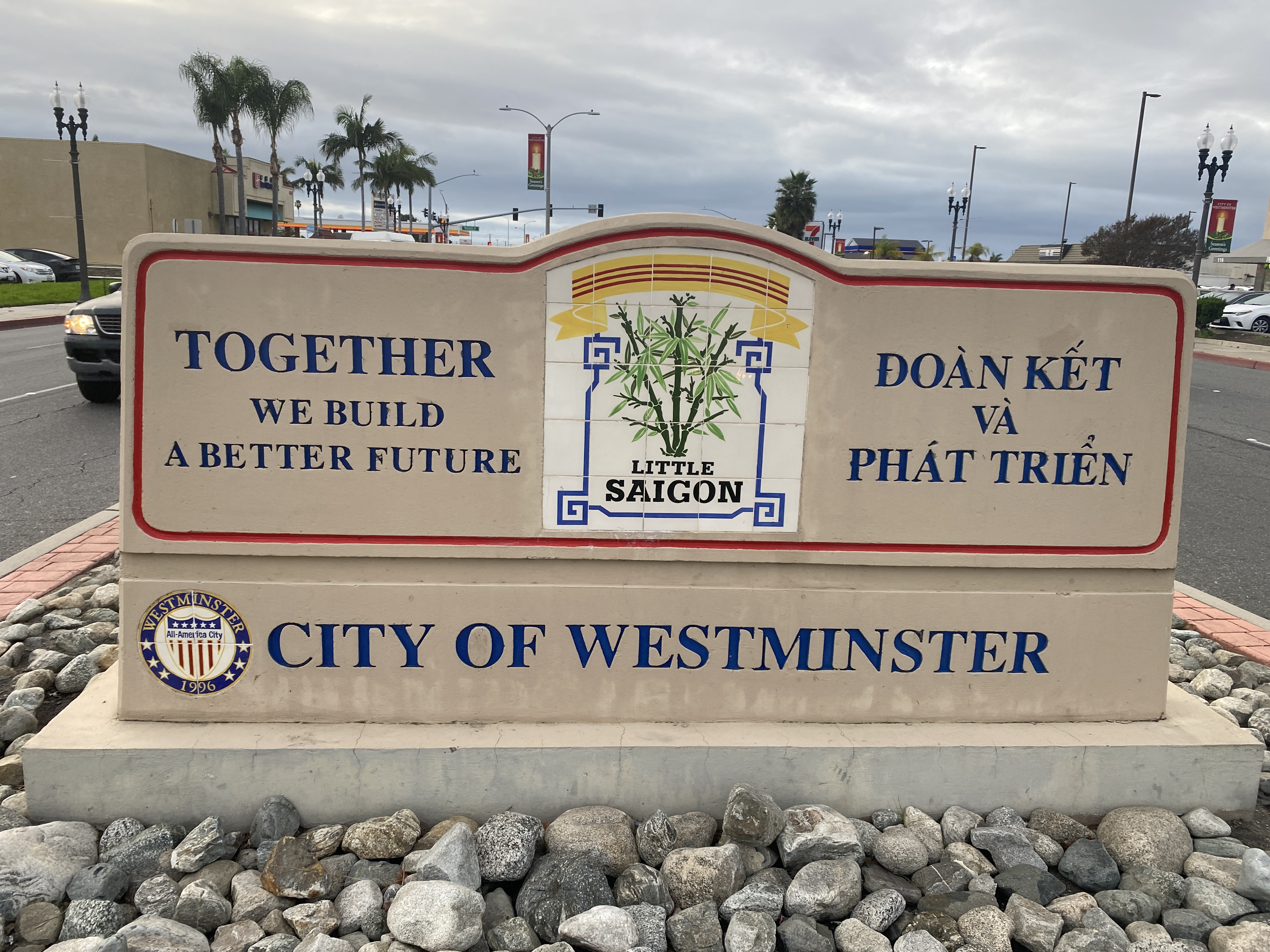
- Welcome sign marking the entrance to Little Saigon in Westminster, California
- Interactive map of Little Saigon
- Coordinates: 33°44′42″N 117°57′49″W
- Country: United States
- State: California
- County: Orange
- Cities: Garden Grove and Westminster

Little Saigon is a predominantly Vietnamese American neighborhood in Orange County, California. The term also refers to the commercial district for Vietnamese and other Asian businesses in the region. The Associated Press and historian Phuong Nguyen consider it "the cultural capital for the Vietnamese diaspora".

The business district is primarily located in Westminster and Garden Grove, while the broader Vietnamese population it serves also resides in nearby cities such as Fountain Valley and Santa Ana. Little Saigon contains the largest concentration of Vietnamese outside of Vietnam.

After the fall of Saigon, various Vietnamese refugees from South Vietnam, including Vietnamese boat people, resettled in Orange County. The area consists of various Vietnamese small businesses, strip malls, and shopping centers. The region is known for its strong ties to the Vietnamese American community and its preservation of Vietnamese culture.

== Demographics ==
The ethnic enclave consists of the largest Vietnamese diaspora community in the world. Broadly, there were almost 242,000 people of Vietnamese heritage in Orange County according to the 2020 census. Almost 200,000 Vietnamese reside in Little Saigon, or roughly 10 percent of the entire Vietnamese American population. Approximately 75% of the population is of Vietnamese descent, with White, Latino, Chinese, and Cambodian residents making up a minority.

== Geography ==
The borders for the Little Saigon Tourist Commercial District are defined by the streets Westminster Blvd., Bolsa Ave., Magnolia St., and Euclid St. However, as the local Vietnamese population has expanded over time, Little Saigon is now often considered to encompass the cities of Westminster, Garden Grove, Fountain Valley, and Santa Ana.

Based on 2021 census data from the American Community Survey, the Woods Center of California State University, Fullerton found that the region in which Vietnamese accounted for 30% or more of the population consisted primarily of the cities of Westminster and Garden Grove, with portions of Fountain Valley, Santa Ana, and Huntington Beach.

== Etymology ==
Originally, journalists used the term Little Saigon to describe the military resettlement camps, such as Camp Pendleton. Before 1988, the region was named after Bolsa Ave. and was known as khu Bolsa (Bolsa area), chợ Bolsa (Bolsa market), or sometimes just Bolsa. The Los Angeles Times first described the region as Little Saigon in 1984. Trương Công Quảng similarly recalled that the name had first been mentioned by newspapers Los Angeles Times or The Orange County Register.

In 1987, Frank Jao and Tony Lâm instead advocated for the name Asiantown; Lâm rejected the name Little Saigon as he felt it was too negative and reminded "people of the bad experiences from the [Vietnam] war".

In 1991, Dr. Co Pham, president of the Vietnamese Chamber of Commerce in Orange County (VNCOC), recalled:

We named the area Little Saigon because the Vietnamese who lost their nation, those overseas, always hope someday to return to Saigon. Therefore, we created the name Little Saigon so that we can remember a day when we can reconquer Saigon.

== History ==
=== Origin ===
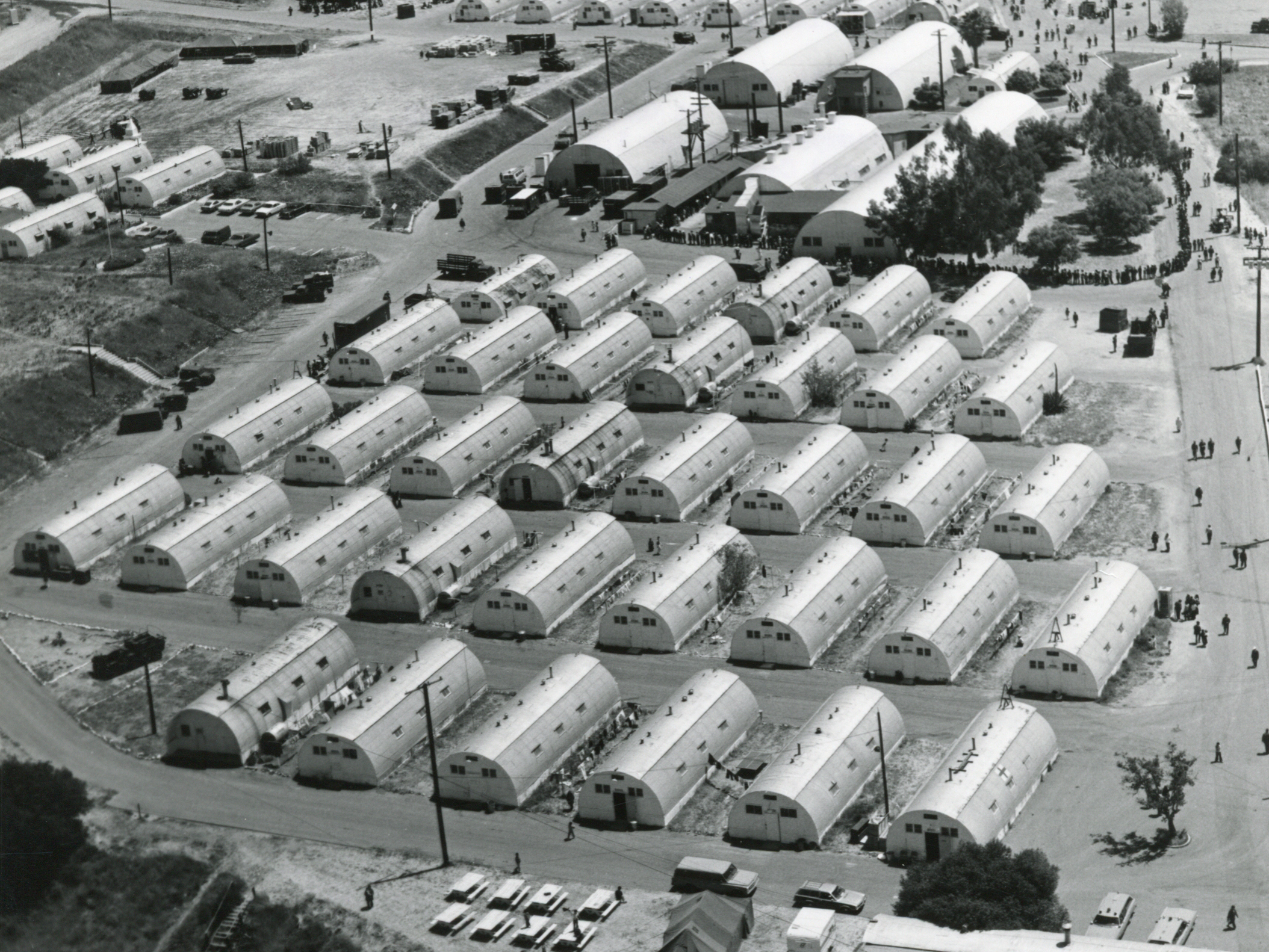
Vietnamese refugee camps in Camp Pendleton in 1975

After the fall of Saigon in 1975, 125,000 Vietnamese refugees were resettled in the United States, including 50,000 from Camp Pendleton. Secondary migration to Southern California after resettlement to other states in the US later occurred due to its warm climate, economic opportunity, and education.

By the end of 1976, there were 12,000 Vietnamese refugees in Orange County, mainly sponsored by churches, including up to 700 in the Villa Park apartment complex in Garden Grove. Later, various Vietnamese businesses were started, such as Saigon Market in 1976 and Danh's Pharmacy and Hoa Bình Market in 1978. In its first issue, Người Việt called the state of California the center of the Vietnamese community in exile.

=== "Second wave" ===
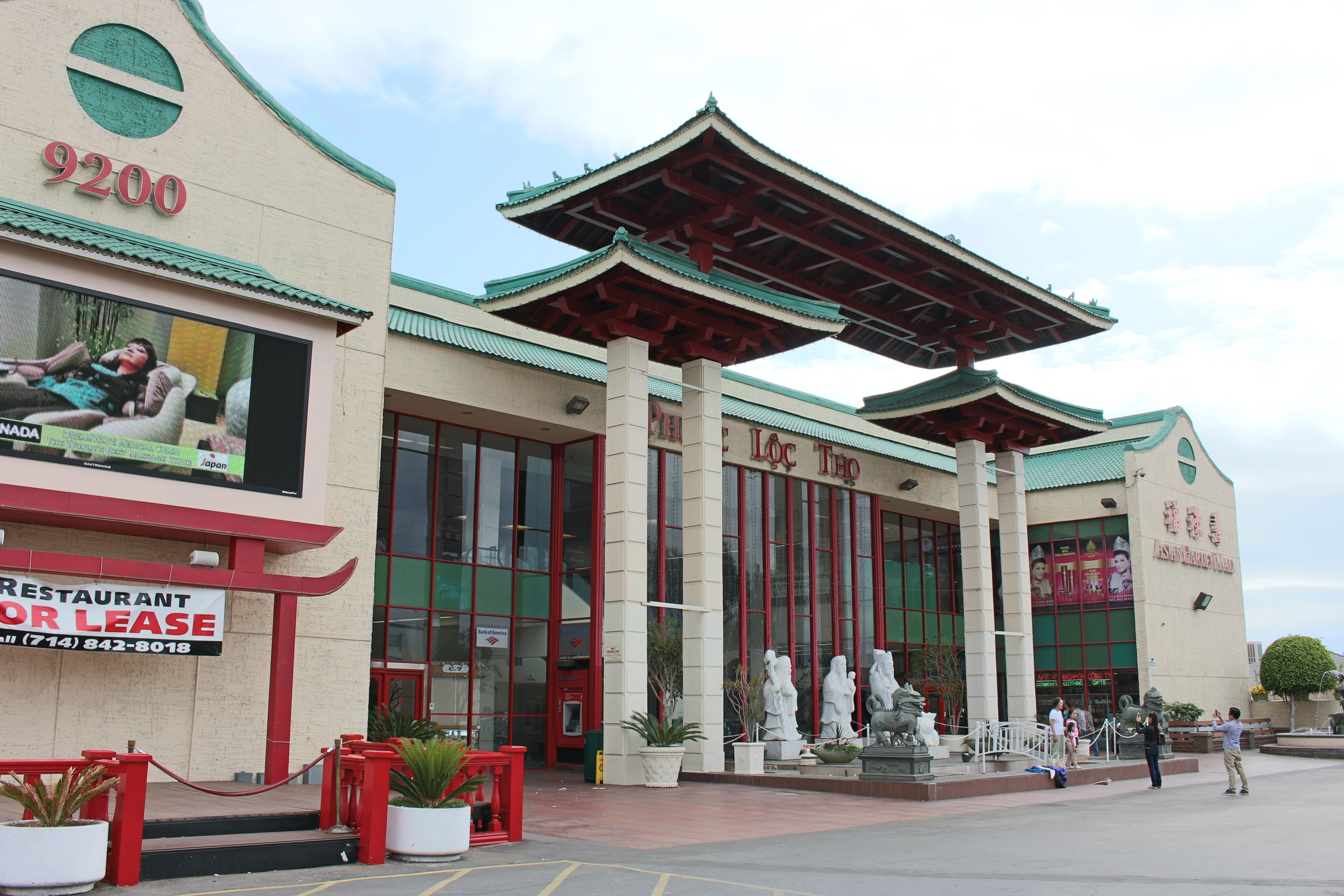
Phước Lộc Thọ, known in English as Asian Garden Mall, the largest Vietnamese-American shopping center in Little Saigon, Orange County

In 1979, the Orderly Departure Program was established, allowing Vietnamese boat people to immigrate to the United States. Hence, a second wave of immigrants who traveled by boat came to Orange County at an interval of about 1,000 per month. While there had only been 30 shops in Little Saigon in 1979, by 1981, there had been a few hundred. By the end of 1980, about 20,000 refugees were living in Orange County. In 1984, the VNCOC estimated there were approximately 650 Vietnamese businesses in Orange County compared to 350 in 1981. By 1985, thousands of Vietnamese immigrants were settled in Garden Grove, Santa Ana, and Westminster.

Residents of Westminster and Garden Grove resented the influx of Vietnamese immigrants. A bumper sticker stating "Will the last American to leave Garden Grove bring the flag?" became common usage by Orange County residents. Additionally, more than 100 residents of Westminster petitioned the city to deny business licenses to Vietnamese refugees.

The first 99 Ranch Market opened in Westminster in 1984. Later, in 1987, Frank Jao of Bridgecreek Development opened Asian Garden Mall (Phước Lộc Thọ) after purchasing land along Bolsa Avenue in 1981. Jao claimed his firm has developed at least a third of Little Saigon.

=== Official designation ===
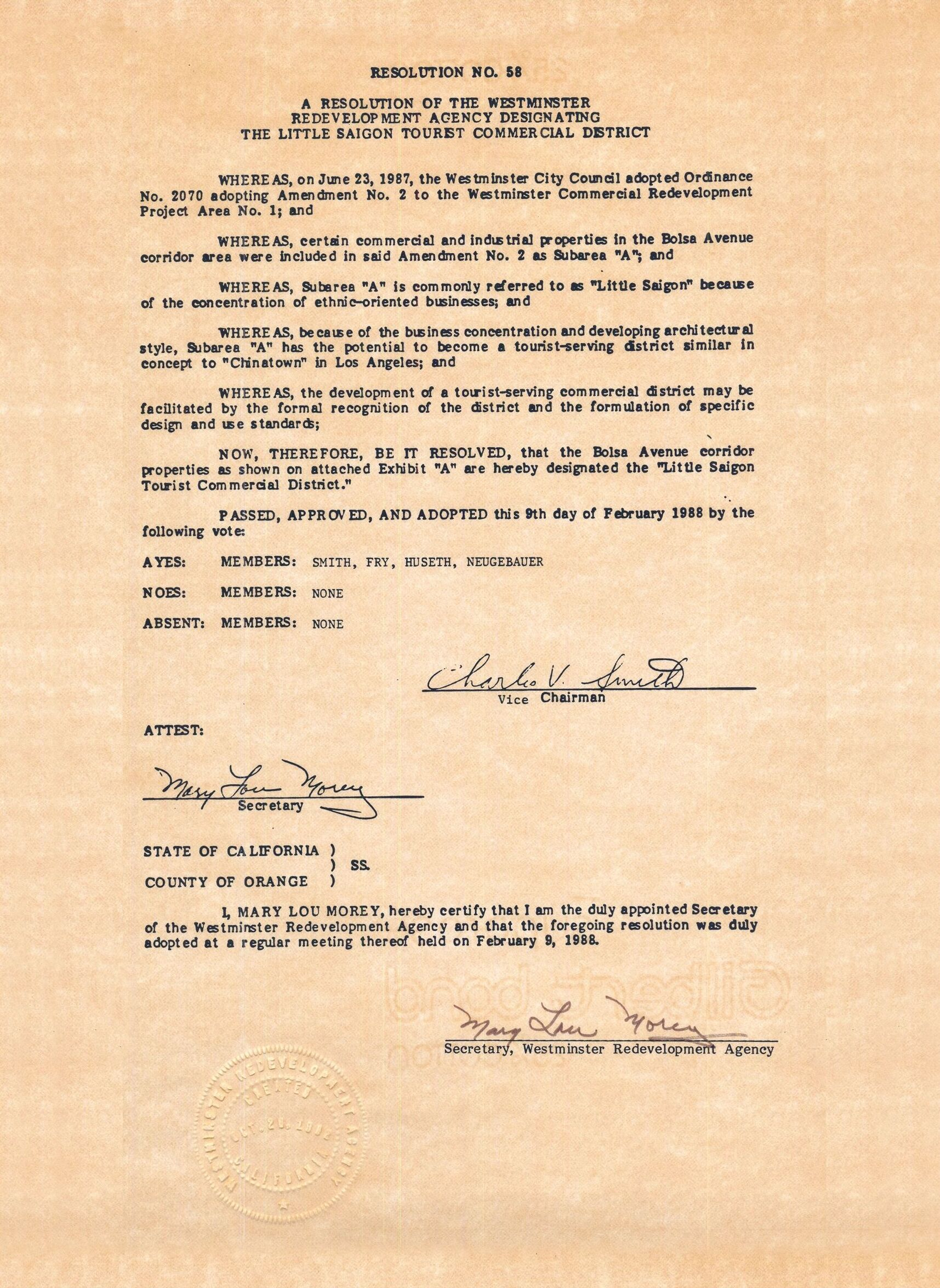
February 9, 1988 resolution designating the Little Saigon Tourist Commercial District

Residents asked the mayor of Westminster and the Westminster City Council to officially designate the area as Little Saigon. However, members of the California State Assembly and the US Congress had to be lobbied to ensure that the area would not only be designated as a commercial area but also a cultural one.

On February 10, 1988, the Westminster Redevelopment Agency approved a resolution that designated a 1.5-mile section of Bolsa Ave. as the "Little Saigon Tourist Commercial District".

Originally, the California Department of Transportation had opposed the creation of signs directing drivers to Little Saigon. Văn Trần, then a "liaison" for state senator Ed Royce, assisted in sending a letter in March 1988 for the placement of Little Saigon exit signs along the I-405 and SR 22 to the chairwoman of the OCTA, signed by eighteen state and federal legislators, including Royce and Assemblywoman Doris Allen. Later, in June, California governor George Deukmejian revealed a freeway sign designating the area as "Little Saigon".

=== Hi-Tek incident ===
On January 17, 1999, Trần Văn Trường posted in his video store, Hi-Tek Video, on Bolsa Avenue a communist flag and a photo of Hồ Chí Minh. Despite a judge declaring the act constituted protected speech, community protests continued for 53 days with a maximum crowd size of 15,000.

=== Later developments ===
In 2001, Lee's Sandwiches, based in San Jose, later expanded to Westminster with its first franchisee. In 2003, the cities of Garden Grove and Westminster passed a resolution to use the flag of South Vietnam at events rather than the official flag of Vietnam. In December 2016, Westminster banned the usage of the official flag of Vietnam on city flagpoles. The area was affected by the Garden Grove chemical leak in 2026, with many homes and businesses in the vicinity of the GKN Aerospace manufacturing plant being in Little Saigon.

== Economy ==
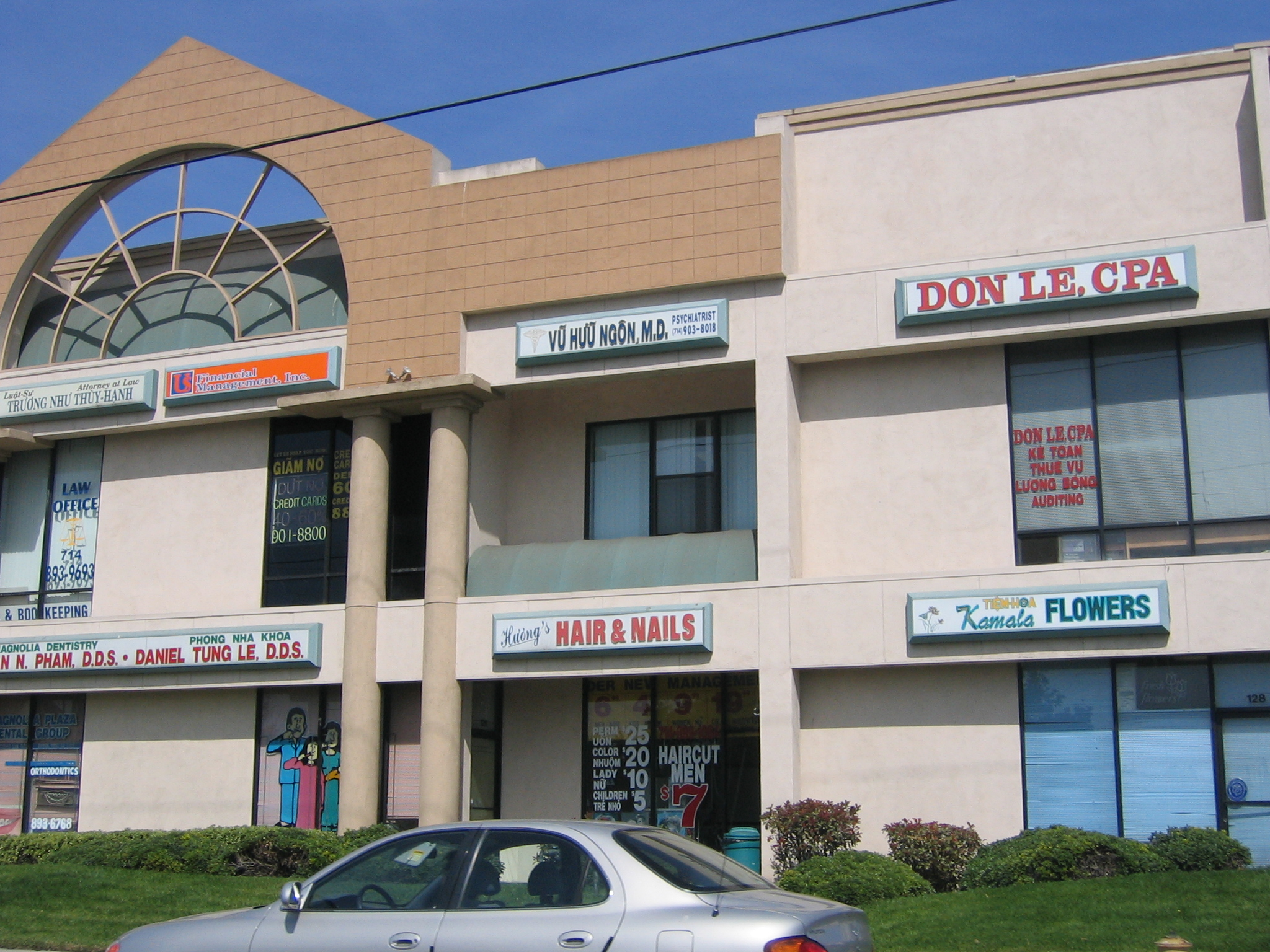
Various professional offices in another area of Little Saigon in Westminster, 2015

As of 2023, there are over 11,252 businesses in Little Saigon, employing 49,896 people. Its largest industries are Health Care and Social Assistance, Accommodation and Food Services, and Retail Trade. It is primarily defined by strip malls and shopping centers. Malls such as "Today Plaza" contain businesses such as dry cleaners, candy stores, pharmacies, and grocery stores. Many Asian residents of Orange County who are first-generation immigrants run small businesses such as nail salons, dry cleaners, and restaurants.

From June to September, there is a weekly outdoor night market at Asian Garden Mall.

As of 2025, Little Saigon brings in almost a billion dollars in annual sales. Tariffs in the second Trump administration strongly impacted Little Saigon's small businesses who often imported from Vietnam.

== Culture ==
=== Landmarks ===
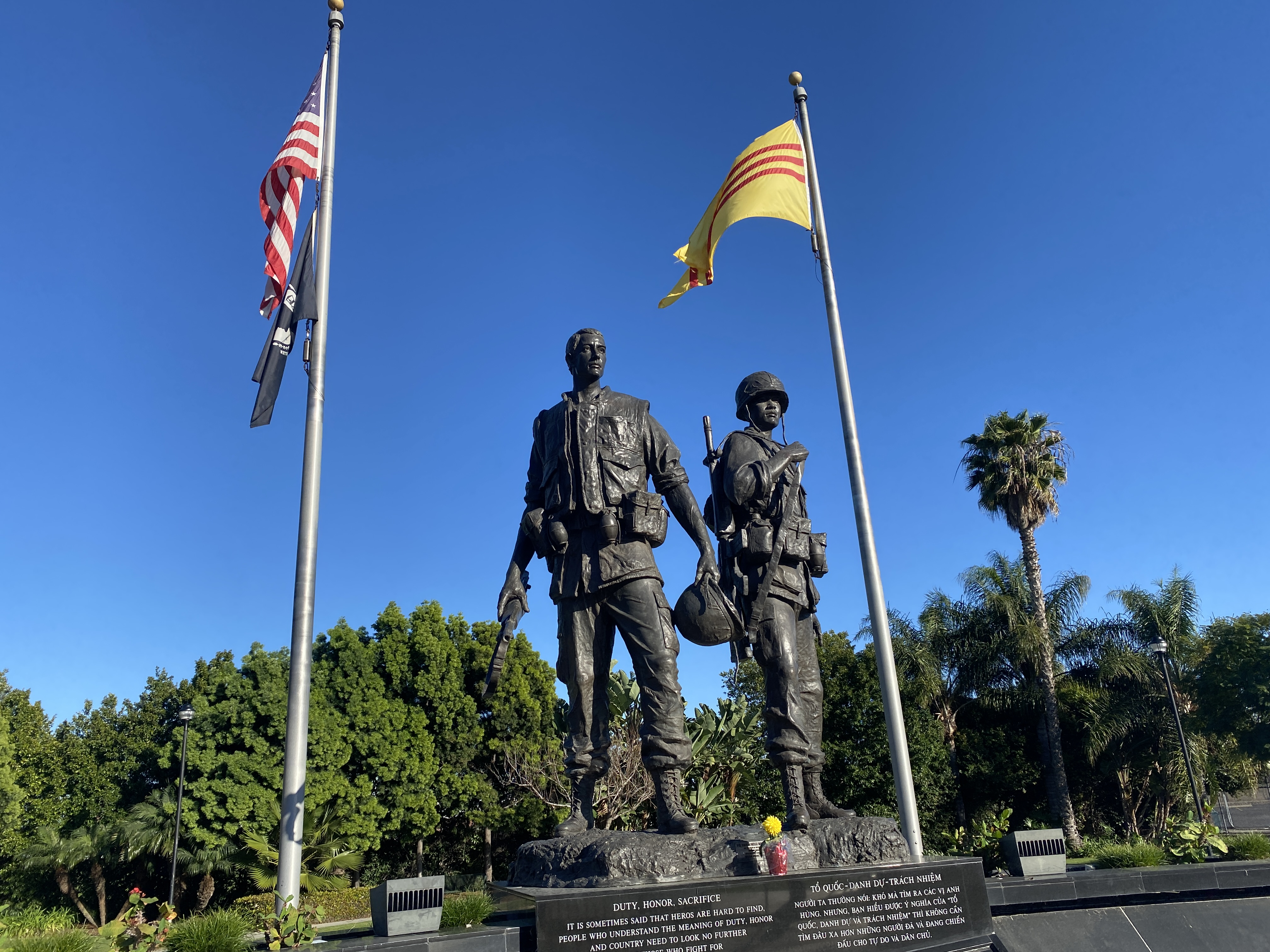
Vietnam War Memorial in Sid Goldstein Freedom Park

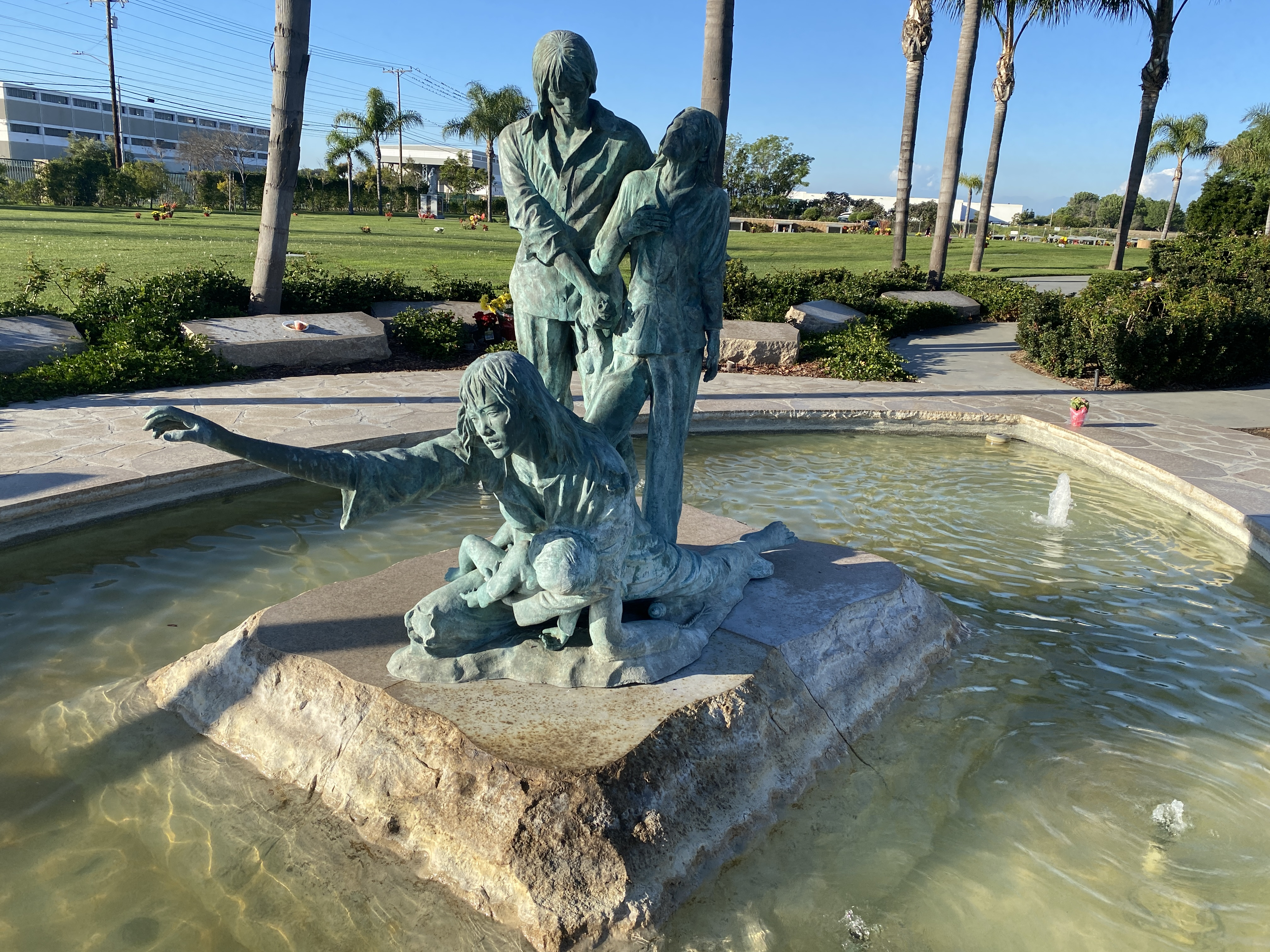
Vietnamese boat people memorial at the Westminster Memorial Park

On April 27, 2003, a bronze monument created by sculptor Tuan Nguyen was unveiled to the public at Sid Goldstein Freedom Park. The monument, which depicted an American soldier and a South Vietnamese soldier, was dedicated to fallen soldiers in the Vietnam War. Later, on April 26, 2009, a memorial at the Westminster Memorial Park was dedicated to the Vietnamese boat people who died while escaping communist Vietnam.

=== Media ===
==== Film ====
Little Saigon hosts the world's largest international Vietnamese film festival, Viet Film Fest.

==== News media ====
Local Vietnamese-language newspapers include Người Việt, Việt Báo, Viễn Đông, and Sàigòn Nhỏ. The daily newspapers' offices are all located along Moran Street, which the Los Angeles Times called a Vietnamese version of Fleet Street.

==== Music ====
Little Saigon has also emerged as the prominent center of the Vietnamese pop music industry with its several recording studios and has a recording industry many times larger than in Vietnam itself. The largest labels are Thúy Nga Productions and Asia Entertainment. While there were about 20 Little Saigon music studios in 1998, only three remained in 2008. Due to piracy sites based in Vietnam, various Little Saigon entertainment companies have folded after 2015.

=== Events ===
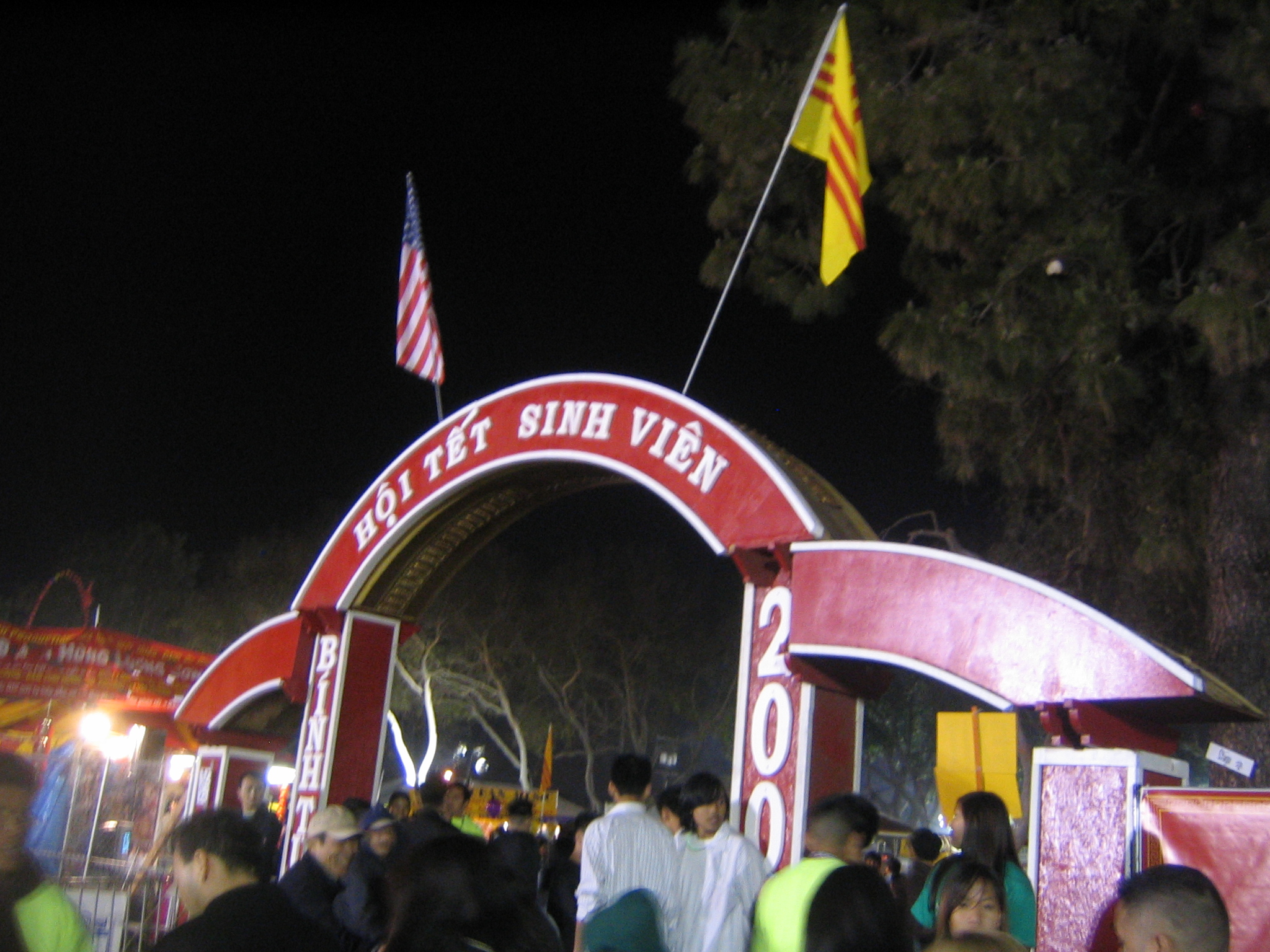
Tết Festival celebration Little Saigon in 2006

Westminster was the first city to formally recognize Black April Memorial Week. The Tết Festival, which was started in 1982 and spearheaded by Tony Lâm, now brings more than 15,000 attendees every year as of 2025. The parking lot of Asian Garden Mall is considered an impromptu town square where cultural events occur, decorated with red lanterns and Vietnamese cultural motifs.

=== Food ===
Esther Tseng of the Los Angeles Times called the region surrounding Bolsa Ave. "a destination for Vietnamese food". Hieu Ho recommended the restaurants Lily's Bakery, Quán Hỷ, Brodard, and Phở 79.

Song Long restaurant has served Vietnamese-French cuisine since 1981. Phở 79, which was opened in 1982 and named after the restaurant's original location at 79 Võ Tánh Street in Saigon, won the James Beard Foundation Award in 2019.

== Politics ==
Due to historical and cultural factors, Vietnamese voters, including those in Orange County, generally hold conservative views. Hanna Kang of Business Insider claimed that the neighborhood was strongly connected by anti-communist sentiment.

After President Bill Clinton ended the trade embargo with Vietnam on February 3, 1994, normalizing diplomatic relations, protests erupted in Little Saigon. Later, in 2000, when John McCain spoke at Asian Garden Mall, he was well-received by older Vietnamese despite his usage of the Vietnamese slur gook. In 2021, many Vietnamese advocated for Gavin Newsom's recall due to their belief that his COVID-19 lockdowns were adversely affecting small businesses.

In 2020, 53% of voters in Little Saigon voted for Donald Trump for president. In particular, Trump's emphatic position against China was appreciated by many Vietnamese.

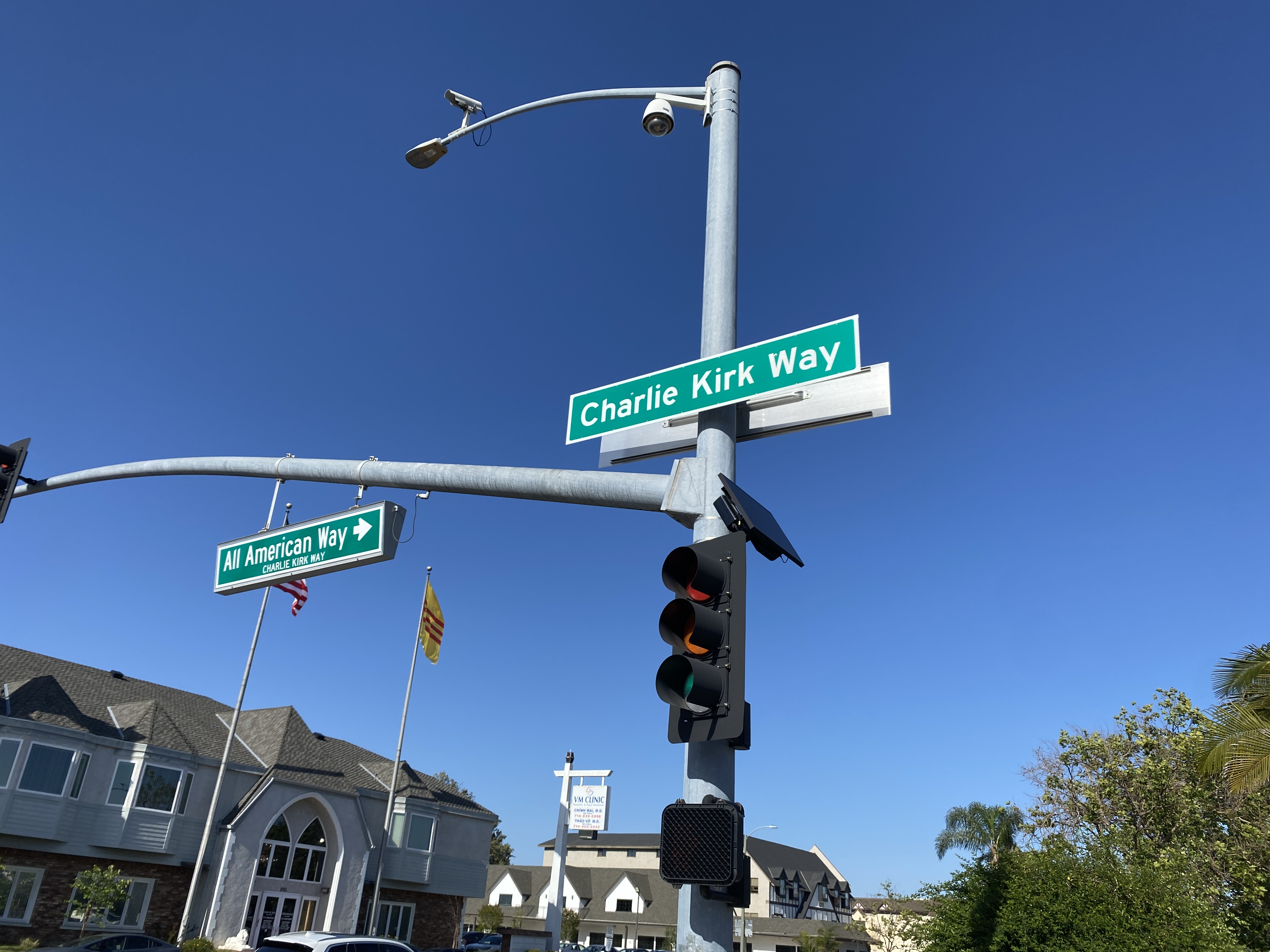
A street was partially renamed to Charlie Kirk Way to honor conservative activist Charlie Kirk

The city of Westminster designated the street of All-American Way as "Charlie Kirk Way" in November 2025 following the death of conservative activist Charlie Kirk, an effort led by the city's Vietnamese-American mayor Chi Charlie Nguyen. Physical signs went up in April 2026; Mayor Nguyen praised the decision, claiming it promoted freedom of speech. The renaming drew mixed reactions, with some local residents either being confused or strongly criticizing the move.

Despite typical conservative views among Vietnamese Americans, there is a growing generational divide in their political views. More than 65% of Vietnamese aged 49 and under in Orange County were registered as Democrats.

=== Political representation ===
In 1992, Tony Lâm was elected to Westminster City Council, becoming the first Vietnamese refugee to be elected into political office in the United States. In 2004, after being elected to the California State Assembly, Văn Trần became the first Vietnamese American to sit in a state legislature. In 2024, Derek Tran became the first Vietnamese American to represent Little Saigon in Congress.

== Notable people ==
- Yến Ngọc Đỗ, newspaper publisher
- Frank Jao, real estate developer
- Tony Lâm, politician
- Danh Quách, pharmacist
- Văn Trần, politician

== See also ==
- Koreatown, Garden Grove
- Little Saigon
