= Frank Jao =

American businessman and philanthropist (born 1949)

- Triệu Như Phát
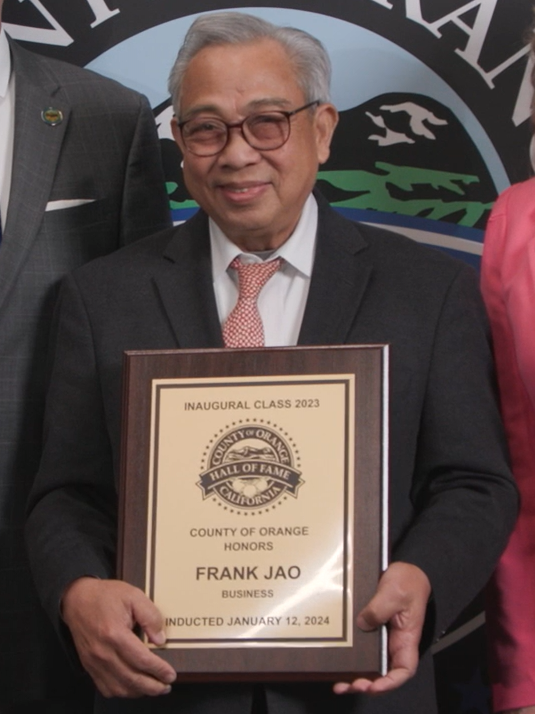
- Jao inducted into the Orange County Hall of Fame, 2024
- Born: June 1949 (age 76–77); Haiphong, French Indochina
- Occupations: Businessman; philanthropist; educational consultant
- Spouse: Catherine Jao

Frank Jao

Chinese name
- Traditional Chinese: 趙閥
- Simplified Chinese: 赵阀
Transcriptions
Standard Mandarin
- Hanyu Pinyin: Zhào Fá
Yue: Cantonese
- Jyutping: Ziu^{6} Fat^{9}

Vietnamese name
- Vietnamese: Triệu Phát

Frank Jao (born June 1949) is a Vietnamese American businessman, philanthropist, and educational consultant. In 1978, Jao founded the Bridgecreek Development Company, a commercial real estate firm responsible for developing about half of Little Saigon, Orange County, including Asian Garden Mall. As a philanthropist, Jao is involved in funding various universities and colleges such as University of California, Irvine and Coastline College. From 2005 to 2006, Jao was appointed by President Bush as chairman of the Vietnam Education Foundation.

== Early life ==
In June 1949, Jao, an ethnic Chinese with a Vietnamese mother, was born in Haiphong, Vietnam as the seventh eldest of eleven children. After Northern Vietnam was taken over by communist forces in 1954, Jao's family moved to Da Nang. After high school, he moved to Saigon, attending night college. Jao learned English from classes taught by a Vietnamese American association. He enlisted in the military at the age of 17, later being assigned to a security unit with the role of protecting American troops. Later, he worked as an interpreter for Marines in Da Nang and for Xerox. He also served as a marketing consultant.

== Emigration to the US ==
In late April 1975, while a salesman for General Electric in Saigon, a US embassy employee told Jao to go to the airport, leaving on a C-130 transport plane on April 28, 1975. He feared for his safety since he worked for American firms and previously had been a translator for USAID. Jao and his wife arrived in Camp Pendleton with $50 between the two. Sponsored by a local accountant, Jao initially moved into an apartment in Whittier, California. He first became a door-to-door Kirby vacuum cleaner salesman, but quit after almost a month to become a security guard. He worked part time as an auto mechanics instructor and attended classes at local colleges, including Coastline College, on finance, real estate, and construction.

After a year, Jao moved to Garden Grove, now working as a real-estate agent. In 1978, he transitioned to commercial real estate.

== Bridgecreek Development ==
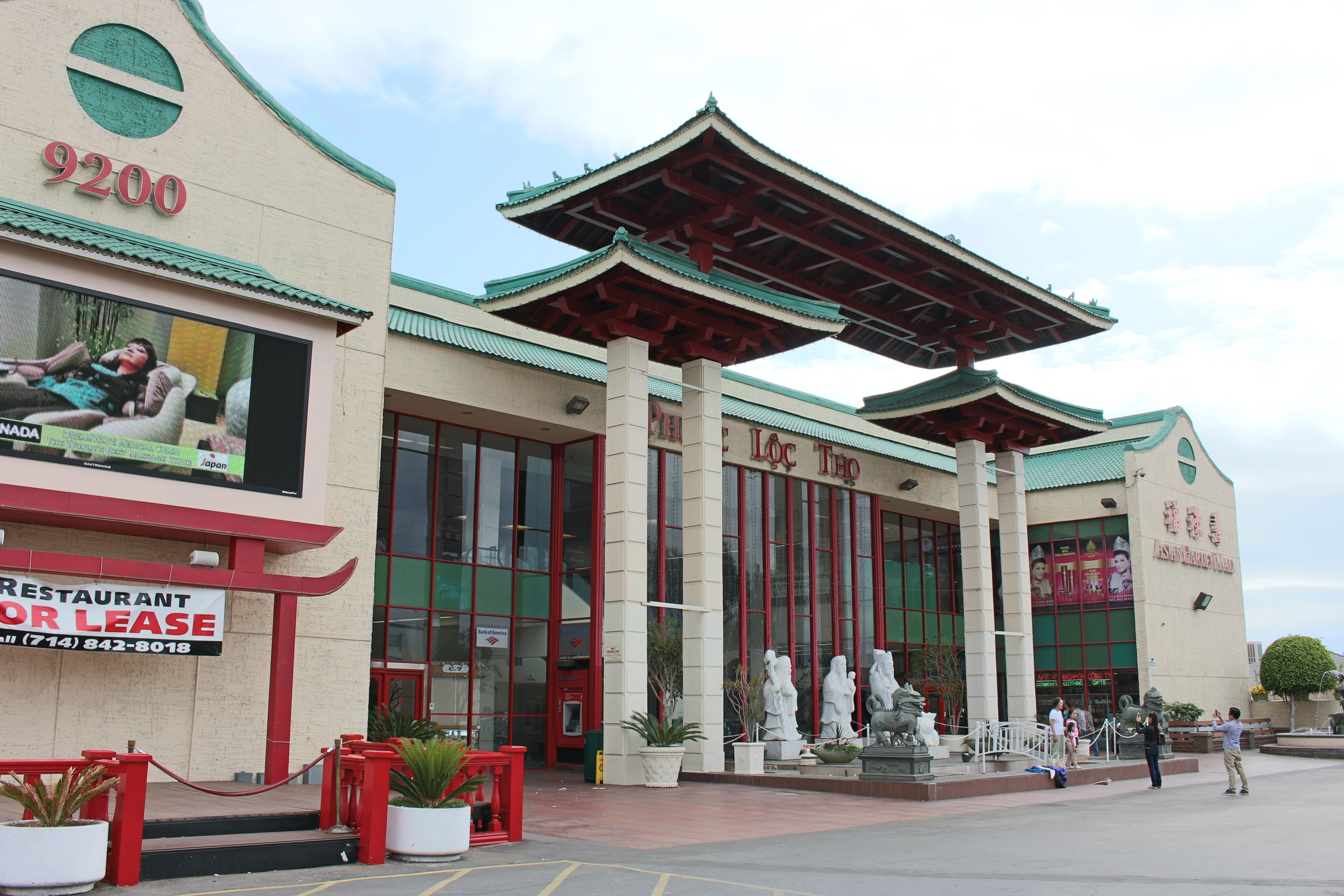
Phước Lộc Thọ, known in English as Asian Garden Mall, a Vietnamese-American business center in Little Saigon, Orange County

Bridgecreek Development Co., a commercial real estate firm, was founded in 1978 by Frank Jao. As of 1997, Jao's firm controls about half of the retail and office space in Little Saigon, Orange County. As of 1992, Bridgecreek Development managed almost $400 million in holdings, including at least seven shopping centers on Bolsa Ave. Jao's properties are owned by a network of partners including Roger Chen, owner of 99 Ranch Market. As of 1997, the firm had 18 employees.

As of 2025, Jao's company has been reorganized as Bridgecreek Group Co., with subsidiaries Bridgecreek Development, Bridgecreek Realty Services, Bridgecreek International and Bridgecreek Asia. Jao has passed off management of the company to his daughter, Felicia, and has since played only an advisory role.

=== Developments ===
- Asian Village (opened 1985)
- Asian Garden Mall (opened 1987)
- New Saigon Mall (opened 1997)
- International Marketplace, San Pablo, California (opened 2001)

=== History ===
In 1976, while traveling to Chinatown, Los Angeles, Jao saw a need for a Little Saigon since many shoppers had no closer place to shop for Asian goods. Businessman Harry Wu convinced Jao to round up investors to purchase inexpensive Westminster property to cater to the Vietnamese who had been traveling to Chinatown.

In 1979, Jao bought a retail center on Bolsa Ave, the Far East Plaza, with financing from an Indonesia-based Chinese investor, ultimately becoming a success. In 1984, the first Vietnamese strip mall, Bolsa West, is opened by Jao and Danh Quach. Jao and Roger Chen partnered to develop a shopping center by converting an 100,000-sq-ft industrial park, opening the first 99 Ranch Market in 1985.

In 1993, Jao traveled every month to Guangdong, China, negotiating with a development team to build a mixed commercial and residential complex.

==== Harmony Bridge ====
In December 1995, a group of seven property owners including Jao proposed a $4-million pedestrian bridge linking Asian Garden Mall and Asian Village. The 30-feet-wide and 500-feet-long bridge was planned to be designed with dragons, a pagoda canopy, and emblazoned with the message "Welcome to Little Saigon." The bridge, now named "Harmony", was subject to criticism when the design was made public in April. Critics argued that elements of the bridge's pagoda roof such as being green instead of red or its curvature were influenced by Chinese rather than Vietnamese culture. Ultimately, in July, Jao withdrew his proposal for the bridge.

== Philanthropy ==
Jao was the founding donor of the Harvard Kennedy School, Ash Center for Democratic Governance and Innovation's Harvard Global Vietnam Wars Studies Program. He has also served as board trustee for universities and institutes, such as for the Asian Pacific American Institute for Congressional Studies from 2002 to 2012.

In February 2005, President Bush appointed Jao as chairman of the Vietnam Education Foundation, which provided educational exchanges between the US and Vietnam. On December 19, 2005, Jao and his wife made a $1 million donation to Coastline College in partnership with a foundation established by Chieu and Yen Le, founders of Lee's Sandwiches. The new Westminster Learning Center was named in Jao and Le's honor, being named the Le-Jao Center.

=== Jao Foundation ===
Jao Foundation was formed with the intent of preserving Asian American history and culture. It has funded University of California, Irvine projects such as the Vietnamese-American Oral History Project and the Jao Sculpture Garden. The foundation has also funded Chapman University and Coastline College.

== Personal life ==
Jao and his wife, Catherine Duyên Phạm, have two American-born daughters. As of 2006, he lived in Huntington Beach after moving from Westminster.

== Legacy ==
By 1997, Little Saigon merchants called Jao chow fou (Chinese: 教父, romanized: jiàofù, lit. 'godfather'). The Los Angeles Times and The Orange County Register have called Jao the "Godfather of Little Saigon". The Orange County Business Journal has called him the "Father of Little Saigon", whereas The Sacramento Bee called him the Asian Donald Trump.

=== Awards ===
In 1992, Jao was awarded the 1992 Golden West College Outstanding Citizen Award. In 2024, Jao was inducted in Orange County's Hall of Fame for local residents. He has also been named in the Orange County Business Journal' "Orange County's 50 Most Influential Business People" in 1999 and the Los Angeles Times's "100 Most Influential People in Southern California" in 2006.
