= Brodard =

Vietnamese restaurant in California

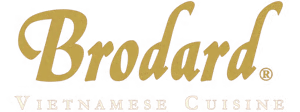

- Location within the Los Angeles metropolitan area Location within California Location within the United States

Restaurant information
- Established: October 1996
- Owner: Diane Dang
- Food type: Vietnamese
- Dress code: Casual
- Location: 16105 Brookhurst St, Fountain Valley, CA 92708
- Coordinates: 33.7289°N 117.9549°W
- Other locations: 9100 Trask Avenue, Garden Grove, CA 92844
- Website: www.brodardrestaurant.net

Brodard is a Vietnamese restaurant in Fountain Valley, California. Formerly located at the Mall of Fortune complex in Garden Grove, it is known as one of the most popular restaurants in Little Saigon and one of the most successful independent restaurant franchises in the county. It is especially known for its nem nướng, which it is credited with popularizing in Southern California.

== Description ==
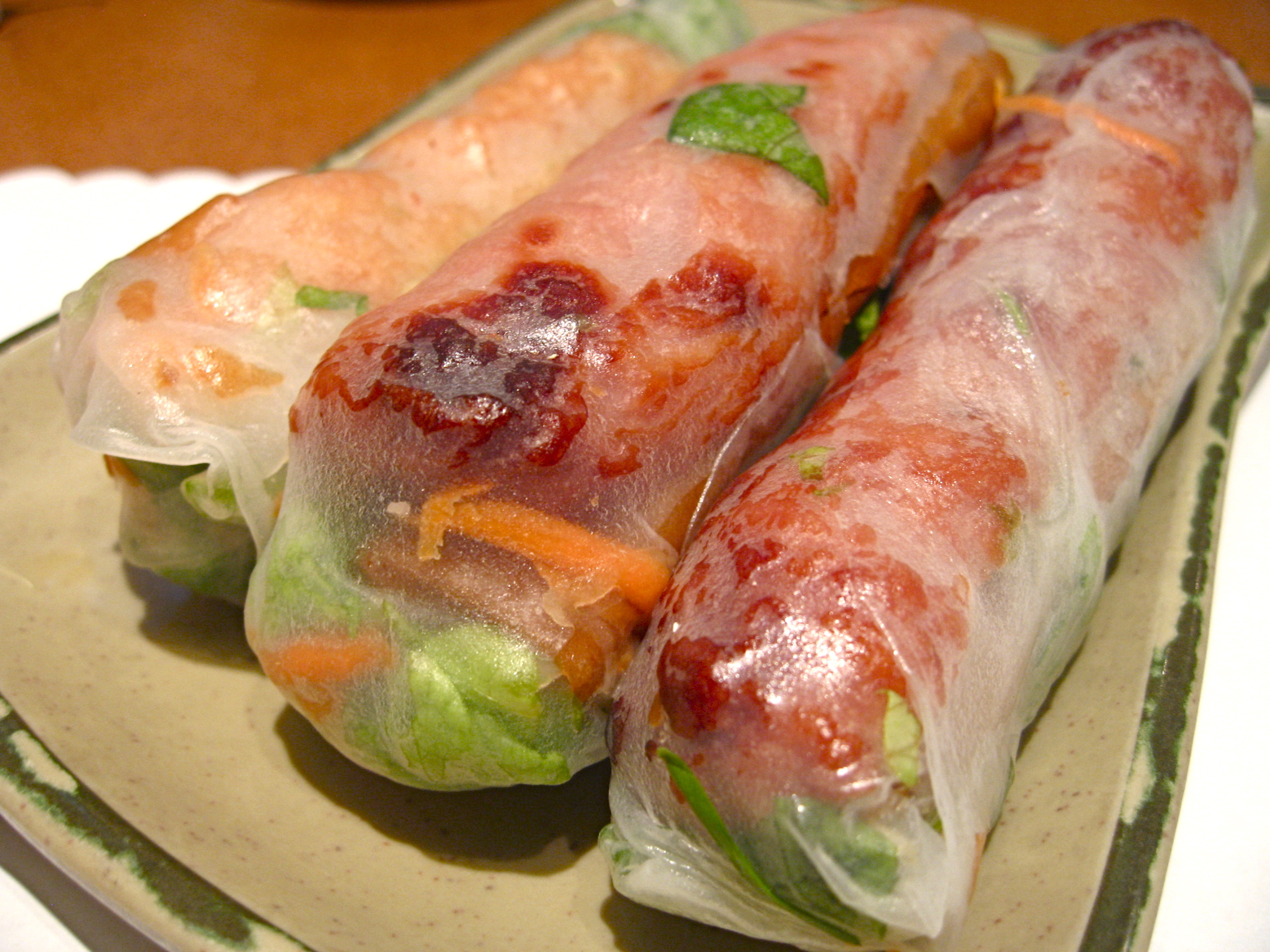
Nem nướng at Brodard

Brodard serves Vietnamese cuisine, which includes bo luc lac, mì Quảng, bánh khot, gỏi cuốn, and the restaurant's famous nem nướng, which has led to the restaurant also selling other specialty rolls. Most dishes come from the central part of the country, although there northern foods as well, such as bun cha and Chả cá Lã Vọng. In 2017, it was reported that Brodard locations made over 10,000 nem nướng daily. Its dipping sauce is also renowned. French pastries and desserts are also sold.

Brodard also operates a fine dining location in Garden Grove called Brodard Chateau. It is located in a building modeled after a Victorian house and features extra menu items including wild king salmon, filet mignon, and tiger prawn.

== History ==
Brodard was opened by husband-and-wife couple Thuong and Diane Dang in October 1996. The Dang family had previous restaurant experience, with Diane's parents opening a bakery, Hoa Bien, in Nha Trang in the 1950s. After emigrating to the U.S. in 1989, the family took over Ngoc Huong in the Asian Garden Mall. Brodard was founded after Thuong got the opportunity to take over a 2,000 sq ft (190 m^{2}) space in a mall complex. He was able to secure a restaurant following local investments, but suffered a stroke that left him bedridden before the grand opening, causing Diane to have to take charge. The mall complex was sold in 2000 and Brodard moved to a 7,500 sq ft (700 m^{2}) space inside the Mall of Fortune.

The restaurant's famous nem nướng were first sold in 1997, after a customer asked Diane's daughter, Chau Dang-Haller, to buy what she was eating for lunch. Dang-Haller later opened her own restaurant, Bamboo Bistro, in Corona del Mar in 2002. After word got around, the restaurant's popularity boosted. Chau Brodard Chateau, the restaurant's fine dining location, opened in July 2006. Thuong died in 2008. In late 2017, Brodard moved its flagship location to a larger, 8,000 sq ft (740 m^{2}) space in Fountain Valley. Brodard Express, a quick-service expansion at the John Wayne Airport, opened in 2023. The restaurant opened its fifth location at the 2ND & PCH shopping center in Long Beach in 2026.

== Reception ==
Food critic Jonathan Gold gave a positive review of Brodard Chateau when writing for the Los Angeles Times in 2014.

== See also ==
- List of Vietnamese restaurants
