= Jao =

Jao or JAO may refer to:

== People ==
- Jão (born 1994), Brazilian singer
- Rao (Chinese surname), romanized as Jao in Wade–Giles
- Frank Jao, Vietnamese American businessman
- Radmar Agana Jao, American priest and former actor
- Jao Mapa (born 1976), Philippine actor and painter

== Other uses ==
- Jewish Autonomous Oblast, far eastern Russia
- Yanyuwa language, spoken in northern Australia (ISO 639-3:jao)

== See also ==
- Chao (disambiguation), other East Asian uses sometimes transliterated "jao"
