= Pho 79 =

Restaurant in Orange County, California

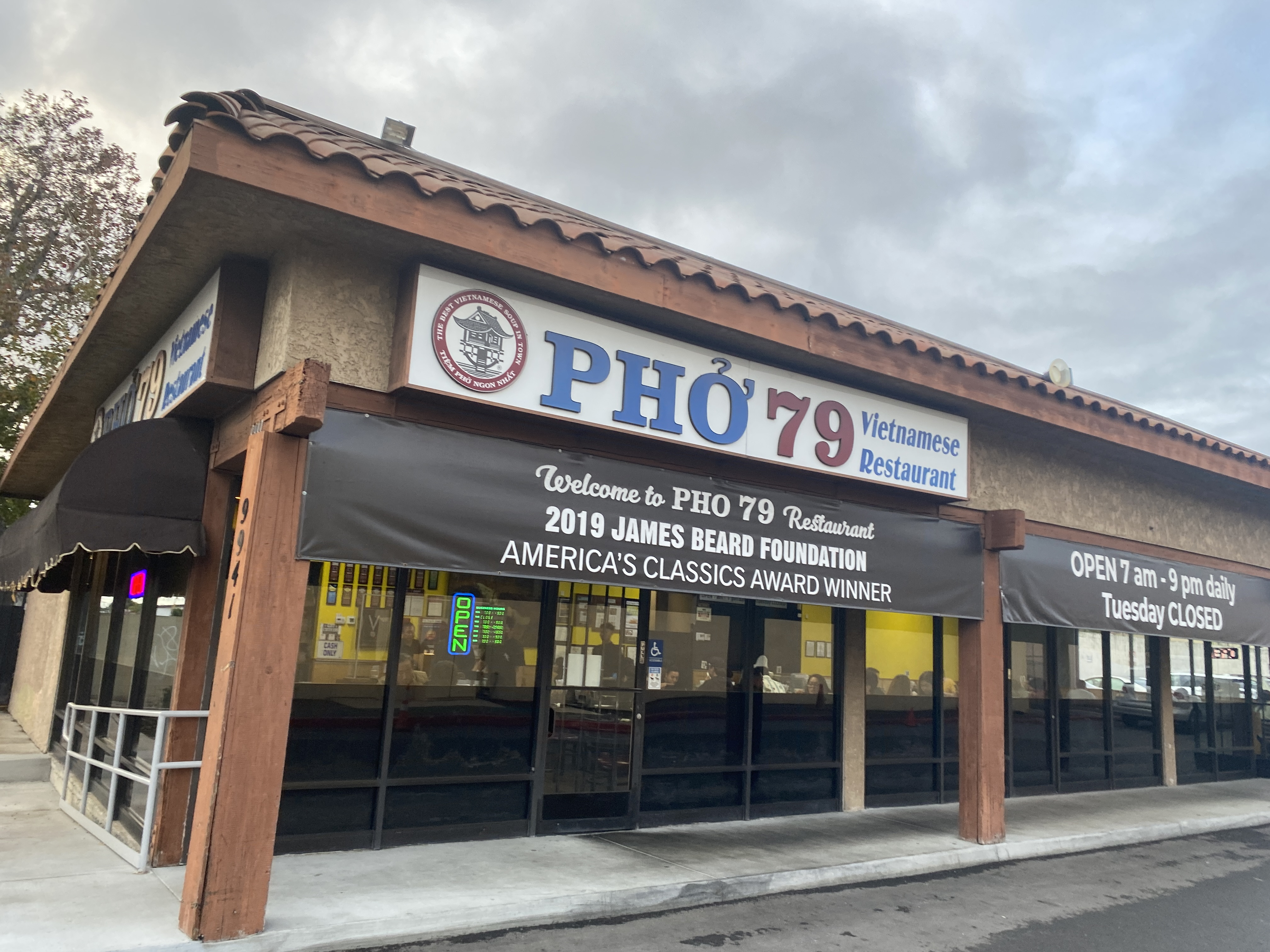
- Pho 79's previous Garden Grove storefront in 2026
- Interactive map of Pho 79

Restaurant information
- Established: 1982
- Head chef: Lieu Tran
- Food type: Vietnamese
- Rating: 4.5 stars
- Location: 8894 Bolsa Avenue, Westminster, Orange County, California, 92683, United States
- Coordinates: 33°44′37″N 117°58′29″W
- Other locations: 5
- Website: pho79.com

Pho 79 is a Vietnamese restaurant in Westminster, California. It opened in 1982 at Garden Grove, California before relocating in 2026. In 2019 it was named one of America's Classics by the James Beard Foundation. It has a Bib Gourmand designation from Michelin.

== History ==
The restaurant was opened by Thọ Trần and Liễu Trần in 1982 in the Garden Grove neighborhood which would become part of Little Saigon, where they had settled after escaping political persecution in Vietnam as boat people and employed multiple extended family members and new immigrants. The driving force behind the opening of the restaurant was Nguyen Thi Dao, the family matriarch. The restaurant was named for the year many of the family arrived in the United States, 1979. The restaurant was one of the first in the area to serve pho and according to the Beard announcement, "helped pave the way for Southern California's Little Saigon to become the dynamic hub of Vietnamese cuisine" in the area. The New York Times said the restaurant was a pillar of the Little Saigon neighborhood.

According to Gustavo Arellano writing for Thrillist, it was one of the first Vietnamese restaurants in the United States.

The restaurant announced its relocation to the neighboring city of Westminster in May 2026.

== Menu ==
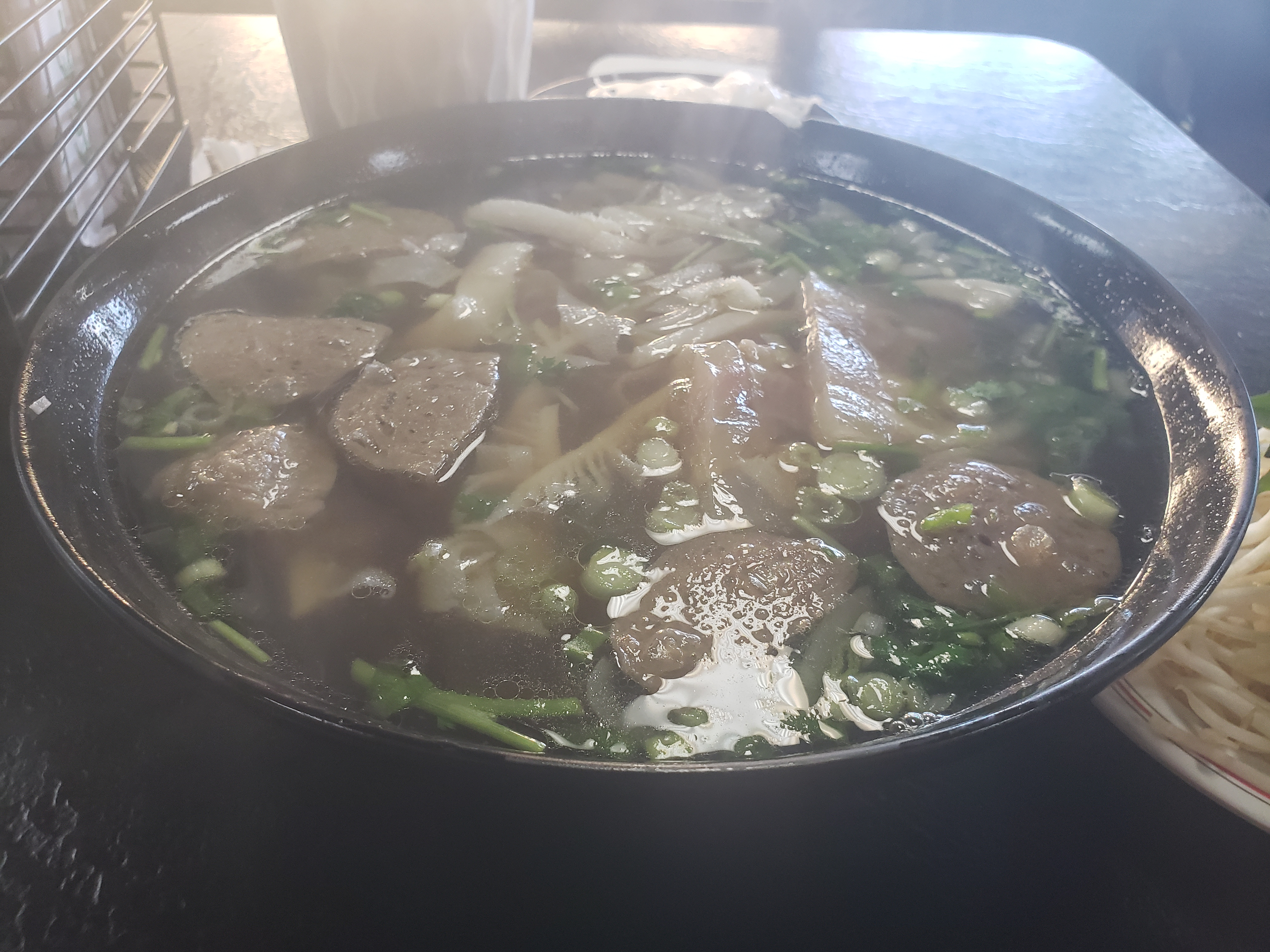
Menu item number 33, 79 super bowl, at Pho 79

The restaurant focuses on the Vietnamese noodle soup dish, pho. Noodles in their beef-broth soup base are topped with brisket, meatballs, oxtails, round steak or tripe. The Beard Foundation called their oxtail "justifably legendary"; the Orange County Register said they were best known for it. The Los Angeles Times called it "famously rich in oxtail essence". The Infatuation said their pho was "deeper in flavor than any other pho you'll find in Southern California".

== Recognition ==
In 2019 the restaurant was named one of America's Classics by the James Beard Foundation. In 2021 the restaurant received a Bib Gourmand designation from Michelin.

When the Beard Foundation called to tell them they had won, the owners were not sure what the award was, and had never heard of the foundation's namesake.
