= Lee's Sandwiches =

Vietnamese-American restaurant chain

Lee’s Sandwiches International, Inc.
- Trade name: Lee’s Sandwiches
- Company type: Private
- Industry: Restaurants
- Genre: Fast Casual
- Predecessor: Lee Bros. Foodservice, Inc.
- Founded: June 1983; 42 years ago San Jose, California, United States
- Founders: Chieu Lê
- Headquarters: San Jose, California, United States
- Number of locations: 61 (2021)
- Area served: United States; Taiwan
- Key people: Chieu Le (Chief Executive Officer); Jimmy Le (Vice President); Tom Quách (Chief Operating Officer)
- Products: Bánh mì, Vietnamese iced coffee, chè, desserts
- Revenue: ▲US$32 million (2021)
- Number of employees: 2,000 (2021)
- Website: leesandwiches.com

Lee's Sandwiches International, Inc., is an American fast food restaurant chain serving Vietnamese cuisine headquartered in San Jose, California, with locations in several states and in Taiwan. Lee's Sandwiches specializes in bánh mì, "European-style" baguette sandwiches, Vietnamese iced coffee, and Vietnamese dessert chè. It is credited with popularizing Vietnamese sandwiches and iced coffee among mainstream American consumers and inspiring several other Vietnamese-owned bakery chains.

== History ==
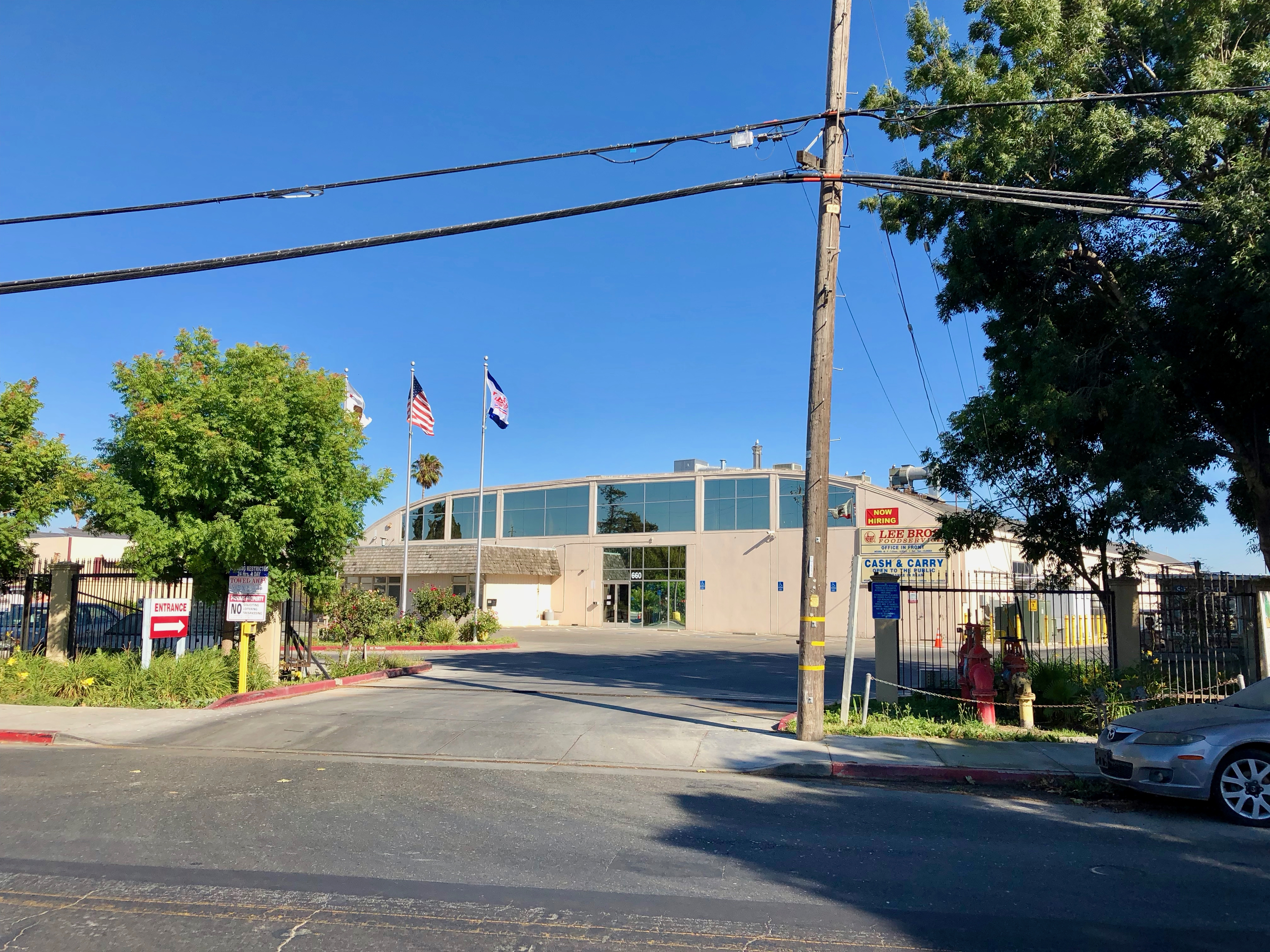
Lee Bros. Foodservice and Lee's Sandwiches headquarters in San Jose.

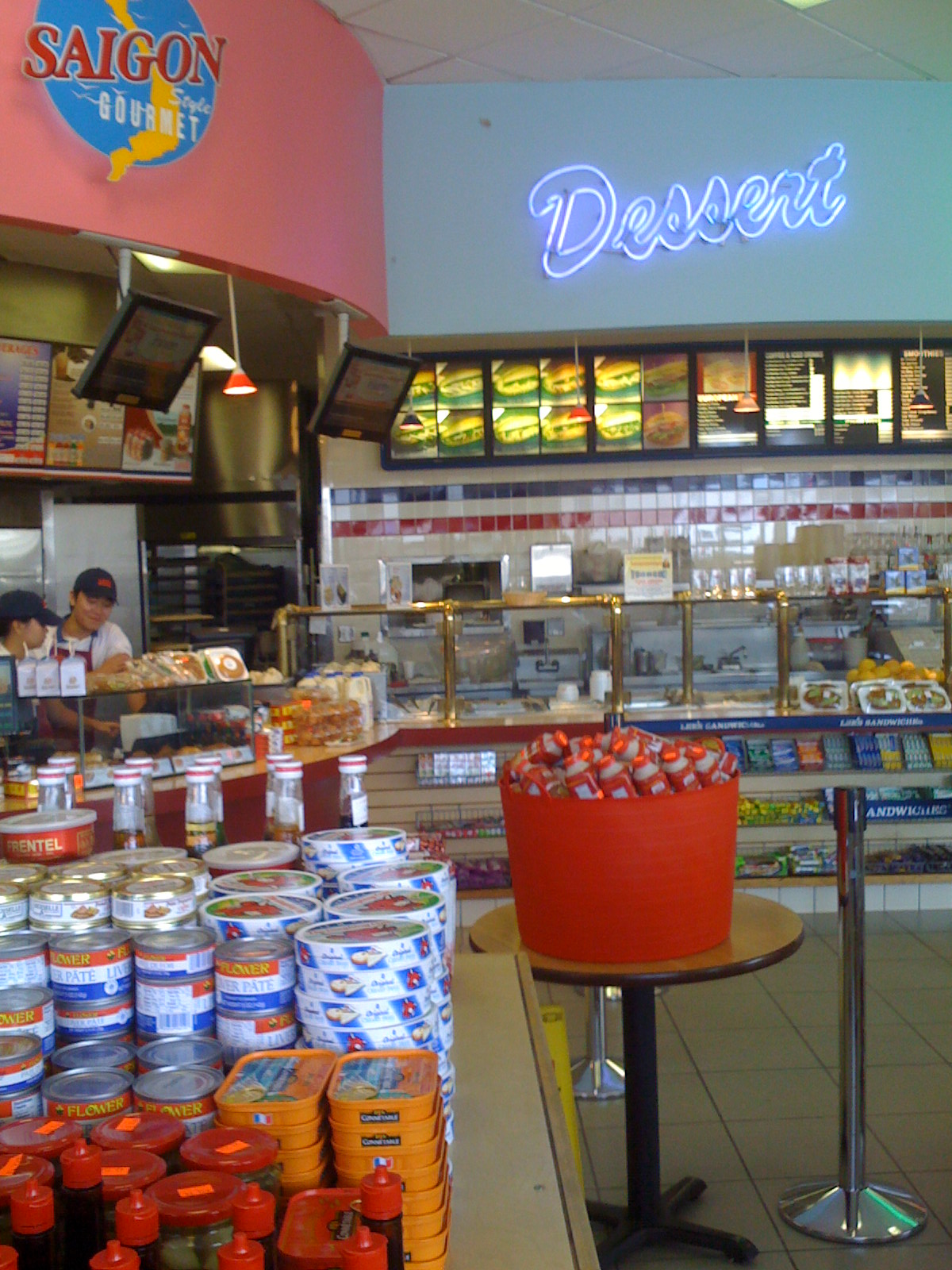
A Lee's Sandwiches location in Westminster, California.

Lee's Sandwiches was founded by the Lê family, who owned a successful sugar refinery in An Giang Province in Vietnam before the Vietnam War and immigrated to the United States as boat people in July 1979. After having lived briefly in New Mexico and Monterey, California, they settled in San Jose, California, in 1980.

Chieu Le (Lê Văn Chiêu) initially worked as a cook in a food truck before purchasing one in 1981, from which he and his wife Yen (Quách Ngọc Yến) sold hamburgers, burritos, chow mein, and bánh mì to office workers on lunch breaks. The following year, Chieu's brother Henry (Lê Văn Hướng) purchased his own food truck, and the two began a mobile catering distribution business. Founded in San Jose's Little Saigon, they named it Lee Bros. Foodservice, Inc., anglicizing their surname to "Lee". It grew to serve more than 500 food trucks by 1985, many of them owned by Vietnamese immigrants.

In 1983, Chieu and Henry's parents, Lê Văn Bá and Nguyễn Thị Hạnh, began borrowing Chieu's truck on weekends to sell bánh mì at the corner of 6th and Santa Clara streets, near the San Jose State University campus. The truck's popularity prompted complaints from nearby restaurants. In June 1983, they opened a traditional Vietnamese sandwich shop named Lee's Sandwiches at the same street corner. In 1988, Lee's Sandwiches moved to a larger space near King and Tully roads in the Vietnamese section of East San Jose.

On August 8, 2001, Chieu and his son Minh (Lê Chiêu Minh) opened the family's first American-style bakery-café in the Little Saigon of Westminster, California. It featured an expanded menu including deli sandwiches, coffee, and desserts, with the goal of attracting Vietnamese and non-Vietnamese customers alike. There was some disagreement among family members about the new direction. However, the new store was a success. Within a year, the chain opened seven more locations and expanded to many other cities in California. In 2005, Lee's Sandwiches became the first Vietnamese deli-cafe to franchise.

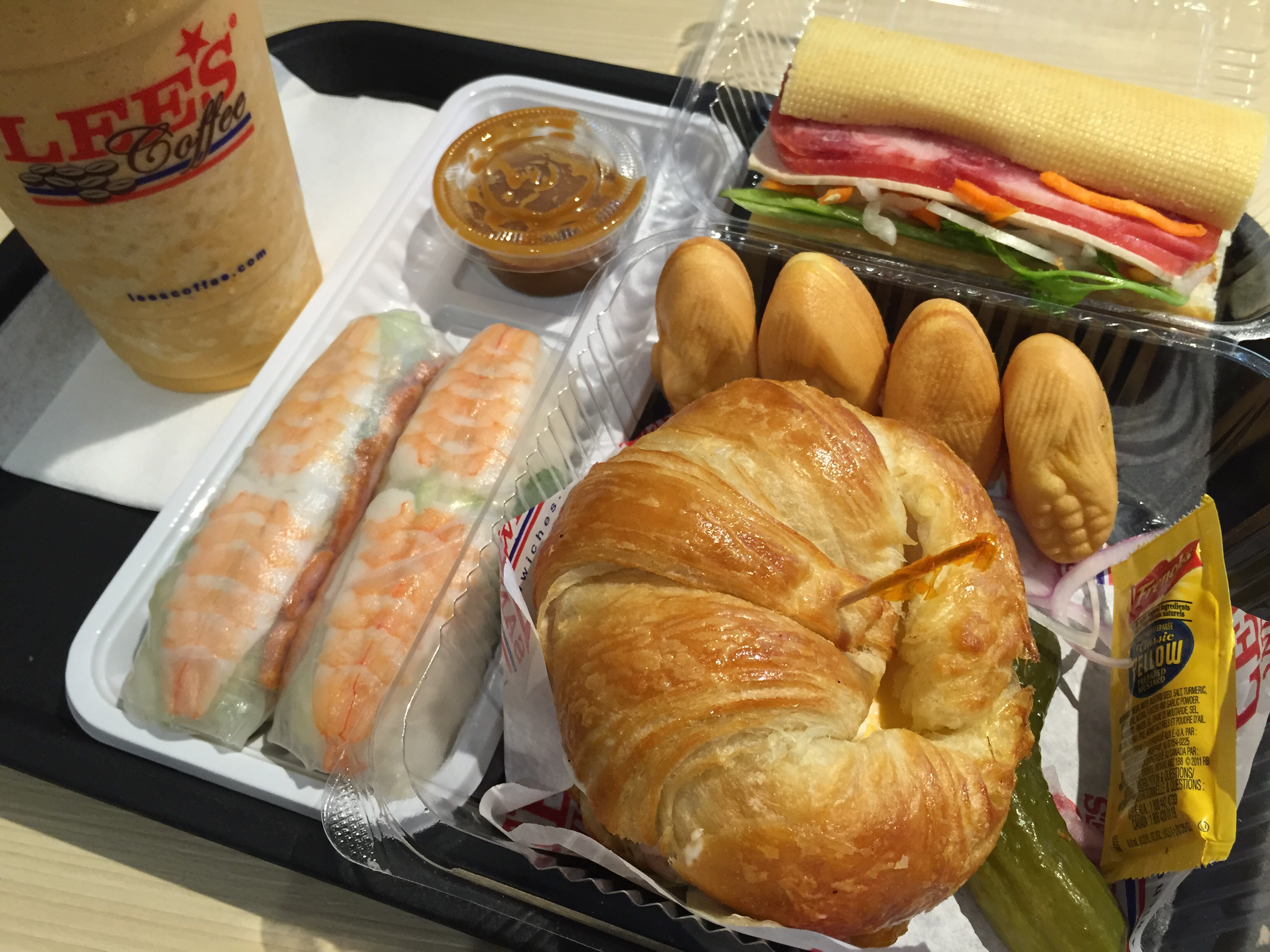
Typical Lee's Sandwiches fare, pictured here at the Taipei location, includes croissant sandwiches, special combination bánh mì, gỏi cuốn, and iced coffee.

By 2006, Lee's had become one of the fastest-growing fast food chains in the western United States. In March 2006, it opened its largest location, at 10,000 square feet (930 m^{2}), in Houston. A long line formed in anticipation of the grand opening of Lee's' first Houston location.

On August 8, 2008, Lee's opened a café in District 1, Ho Chi Minh City, as part of a joint venture with a South Korean company. In August 2015, it opened a location near the Taipei station in Taipei, Taiwan. As of April 2017, market research firm Sundale Research listed Lee's Sandwiches among the 12 largest bakery-café chains in the United States. On August 8, 2017, the Lê family opened a café named Lee's Coffee Roastery adjacent to a Lee's Sandwiches location in Westminster, California.

Many restaurants stopped dine-in service in March 2020 to combat the COVID-19 pandemic, with take-away and pickup service available.

== Restaurants ==
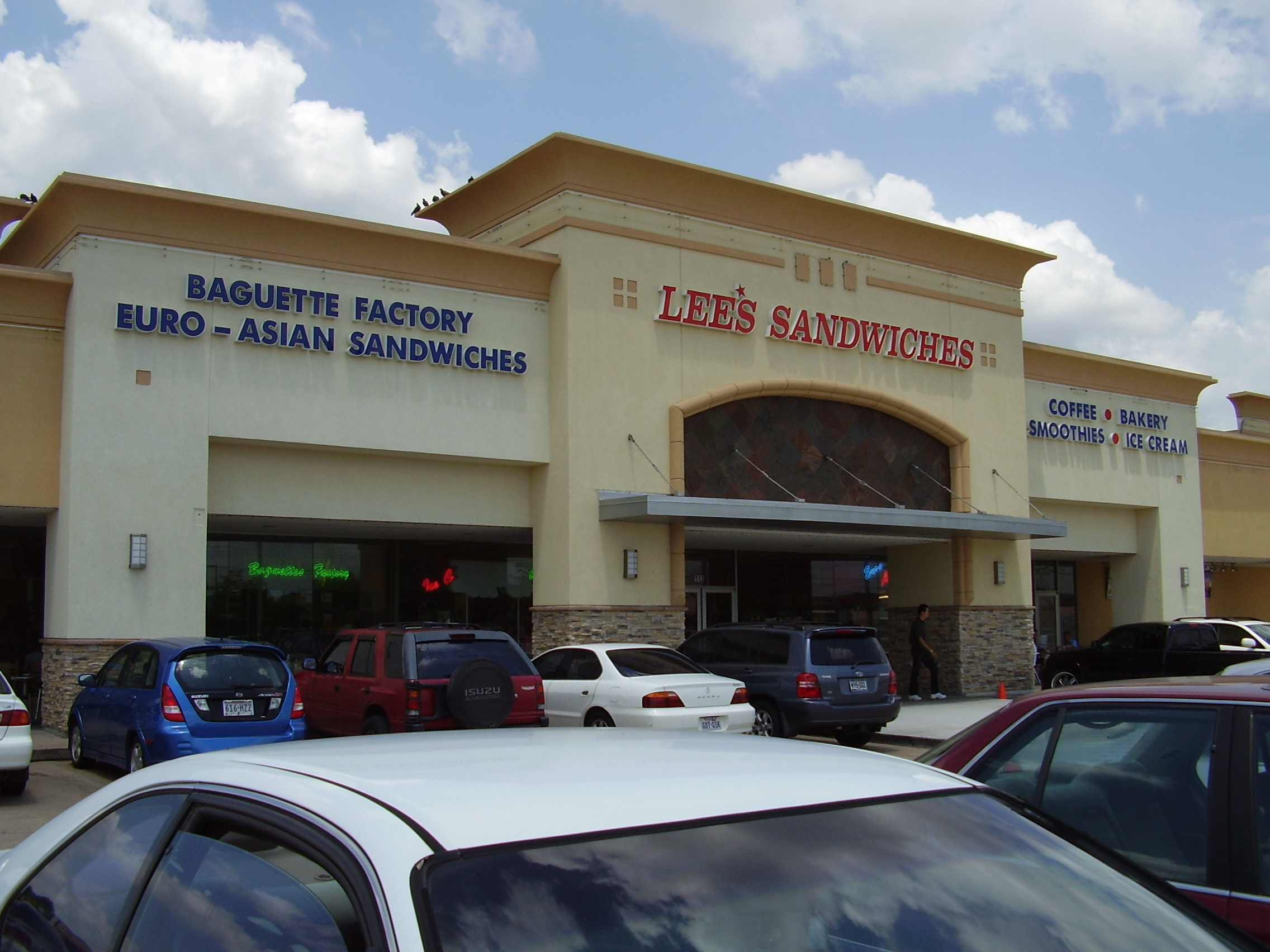
Lee's Sandwiches Bellaire, located in the International District, Houston, Texas, is the chain's largest location at 10,000 square feet (930 m^{2}). The store bakes up to 300 baguettes per hour.

As of 2018, Lee's Sandwiches has 59 locations in the United States. They are located in cities with large Vietnamese American populations in Arizona, California, Colorado, Nevada, Oklahoma, Oregon, Texas, and Virginia. One shop is located in front of the original location, next to San Jose City Hall. Lee's Sandwiches has locations in food courts at the Asian Garden Mall in Westminster, California, and the Cali Saigon Mall in Garland, Texas. With locations in Westminster Mall in Westminster and Eastport Plaza in Portland, Oregon, Lee's Sandwiches is one of the first Vietnamese businesses to enter mainstream malls and shopping centers.

== See also ==
- List of bakery cafés
- List of restaurant chains in the United States
- List of Vietnamese restaurants
- Phở Hòa, another Vietnamese restaurant chain that began in San Jose
