= Asian Garden Mall =

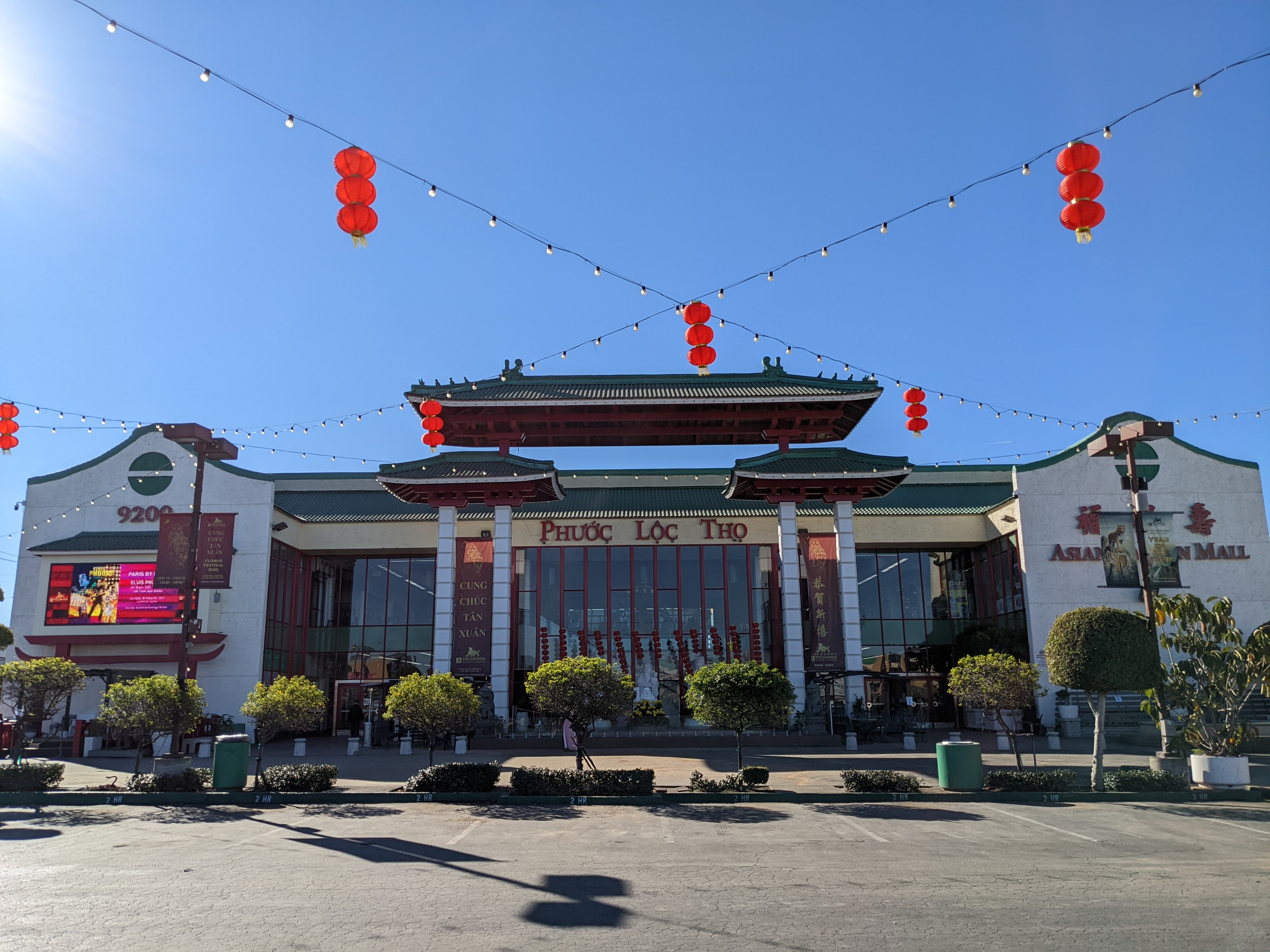
- Asian Garden Mall in 2022
- Location: Westminster, California
- Coordinates: 33°44′37″N 117°58′07″W
- Address: 9200 Bolsa Ave, Westminster, CA 92683
- Opened: 1987
- Developer: Bridgecreek Development
- Owner: Bridgecreek Development
- Num. of stores: 300
- Floor area: 160,000 sq ft (15,000 m^{2})
- Floors: 2
- Website: www.asiangardenmall.com

Asian Garden Mall, known in Vietnamese as Phước Lộc Thọ, is a shopping center in Westminster, California. Opened in 1987, Asian Garden Mall is the first and largest Vietnamese-American shopping mall and is seen as a symbol of the community. The mall is located at 9200 Bolsa Avenue, serving as the focal point of Little Saigon in Orange County and is the site of many cultural and political events in the Vietnamese-American community.

== Names ==
In Vietnamese the mall is called Phước Lộc Thọ, which has the same meaning as the Chinese name 福祿壽 (Fú Lù Shòu), from the names of three deities in traditional Chinese and Vietnamese beliefs representing fortune (phước), prosperity (lộc), and longevity (thọ). To attract non-Vietnamese customers, the developers gave it the English name Asian Garden Mall. In Vietnamese-language media and vernacular of local Vietnamese-speaking people, the mall is invariably called Phước Lộc Thọ.

== History ==
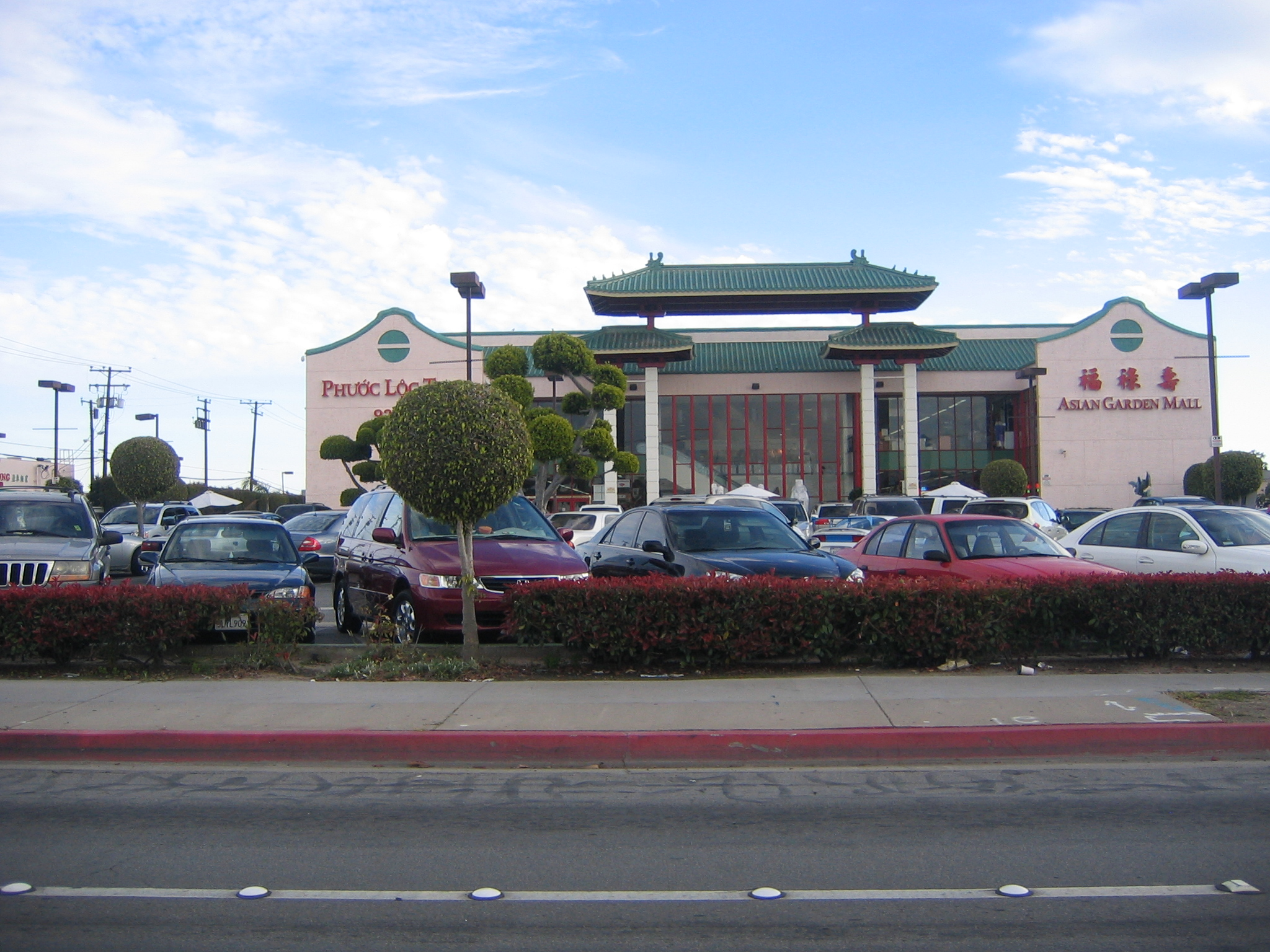
Asian Garden Mall in 2005

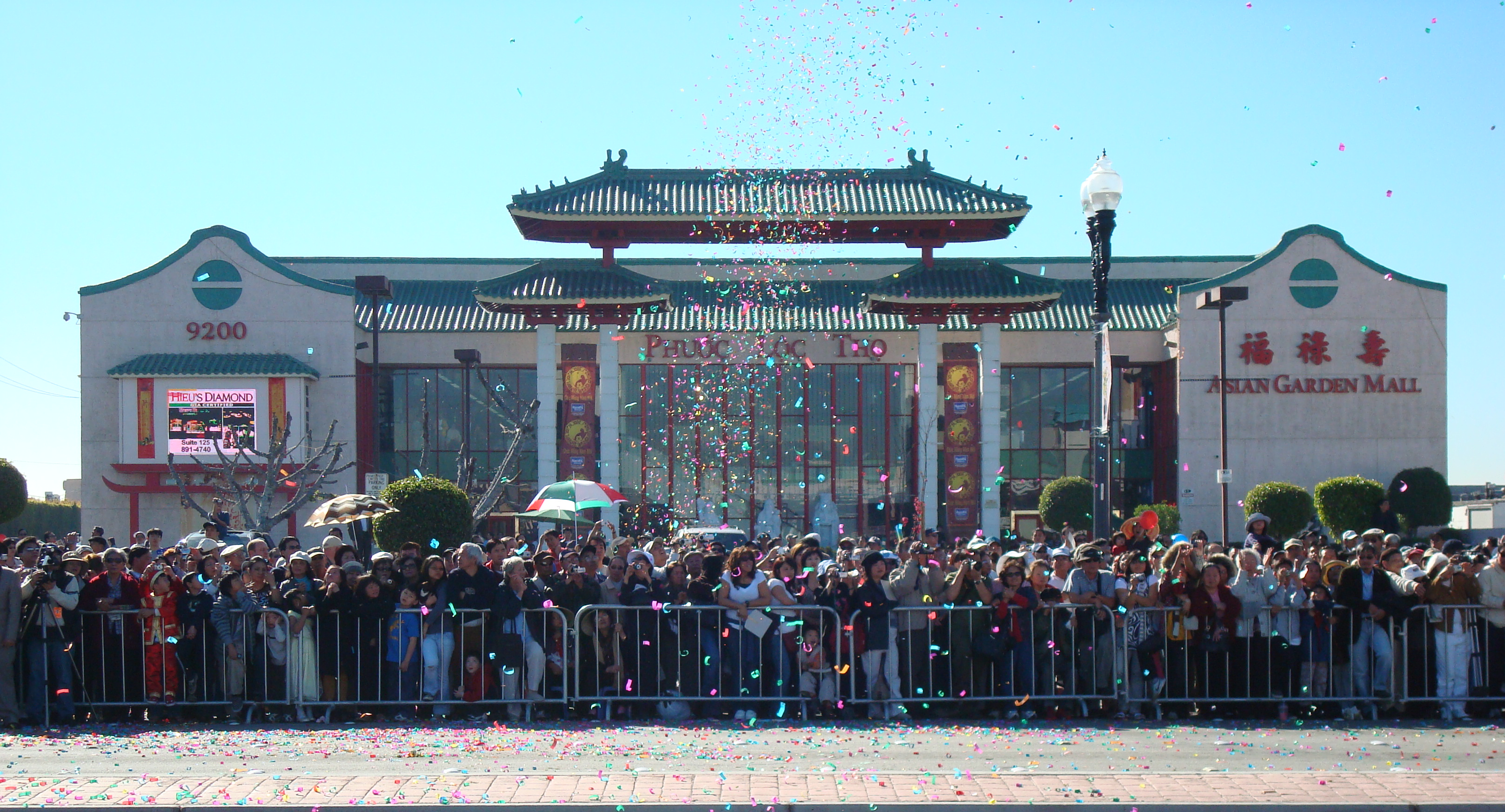
Tết celebrations at Asian Garden Mall in 2008

The history of Asian Garden Mall is intimately connected to the history of Little Saigon, underscoring its central role in the area. Following the Fall of Saigon on April 30, 1975, many Vietnamese people moved to Orange County and started many businesses. In 1978, Frank Jao, a Vietnamese with Chinese roots, started the real estate firm Bridgecreek Development and bought empty land alongside Bolsa Avenue for development. By 1987, there were more than 550 businesses operating in the area, and each weekend brought in 20,000 to 50,000 shoppers.

Asian Garden Mall was developed since 1986 and opened for business the following year, as the second phase of Jao's development plan for the land that Bridgecreek owned alongside Bolsa Avenue. The first phase was a shopping center across the street from Asian Garden Mall named Asian Village, developed in 1985. Development involved capital from many Asian investors, including a Chinese Indonesian and Roger Chen, who started the 99 Ranch Market chain with the first location inside Asian Village. The total cost of the mall was $15 million. To attract non-Vietnamese customers and investors, Jao gave the projects names that de-emphasize their Vietnamese-ness (such as "Asian Garden Mall") and lobbied to name the area "Asiantown" instead of "Little Saigon" that many Vietnamese activists were calling for. However, his effort to name the area "Asiantown" was unsuccessful; meanwhile, Asian Garden Mall immediately became a mainstay of the community after opening—in 1988 the Governor of California George Deukmejian came to the mall to inaugurate the business area with the name "Little Saigon".

In the mid-1990s, the mall faced the prospect of irrelevancy as younger Vietnamese Americans joined mainstream society and moved further away from Little Saigon. Community leaders wanted to attract younger people. In order to attract mainstream visitors, Jao wanted to reduce the Vietnamese nature of Little Saigon. In 1996, he proposed building a pedestrian bridge 500 ft (150 m) long and 30 ft (9.1 m) wide across Bolsa Avenue, to be named Harmony Bridge, connecting Asian Garden Mall and Asian Village. However, this proposal encountered stiff opposition from the Vietnamese community; opponents objected to the Chinese-influenced motifs in the bridge's exterior decorations, complaining that the design was "too Chinese" and did not accurately represent Vietnamese culture. In the end, his company was forced to scrap the plan.

During the COVID-19 pandemic, Asian Garden Mall was forced to close, along with other malls in California. To cope, the mall turned its parking lot into an open-air market with many shops. The mall reopened in 2021 at limited capacity, and was fully open by 2022.

== Description ==
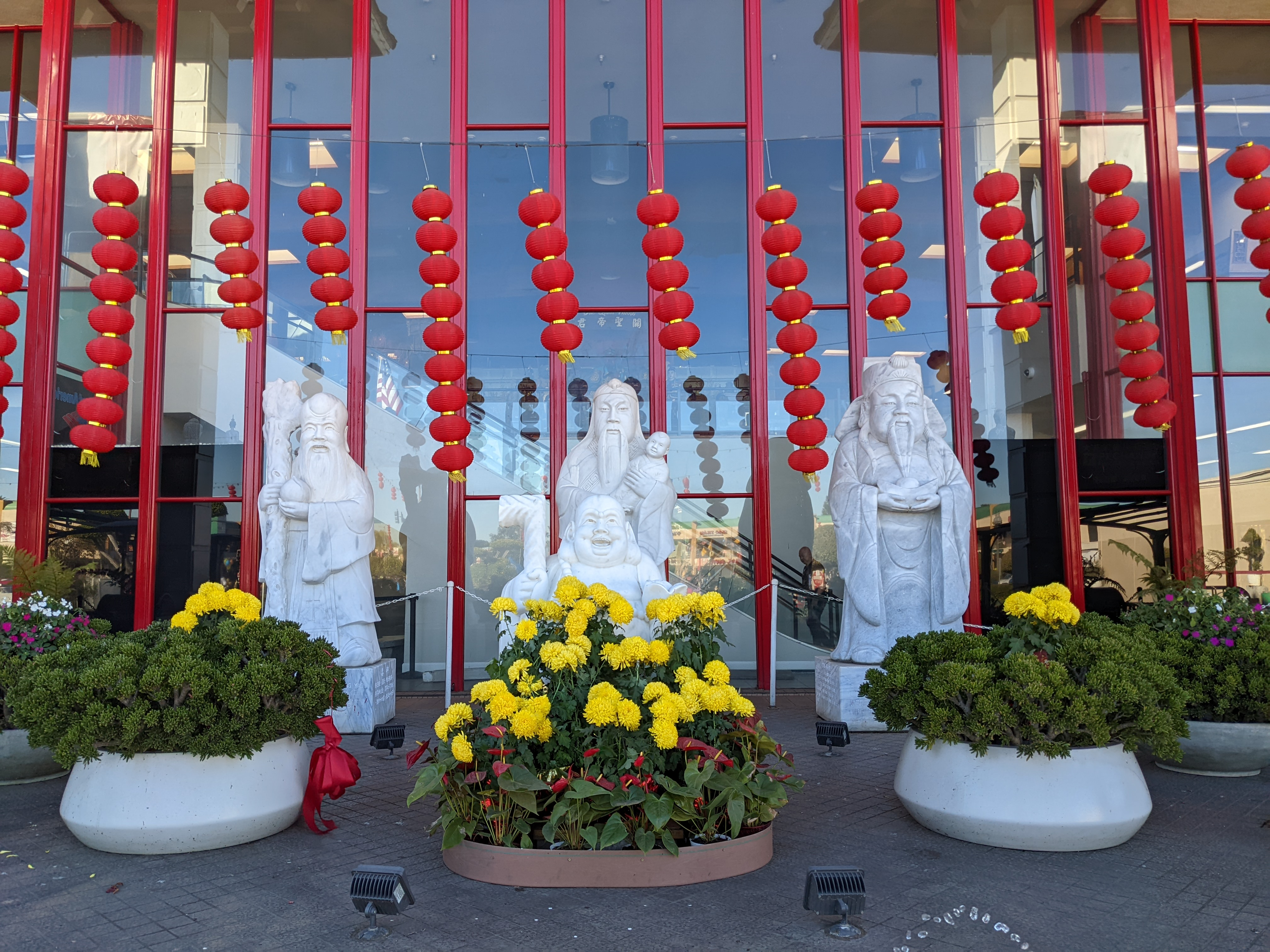
The courtyard in front of Asian Garden Mall

Asian Garden Mall is the largest shopping mall in Little Saigon and the largest shopping center for Vietnamese people in the United States. Although its English name only mentions Asian people and does not specifically highlight its Vietnamese roots, goods and services in the mall are primarily provided by Vietnamese shop owners catering to Vietnamese customers, especially cultural and culinary products.

The mall consists of a 2-story building, with a parking lot in the front and back. In front of the building there are statues of the three eponymous deities Phước, Lộc, and Thọ, along with a statue of Di-lặc. The building has distinctive architecture, communicating its Vietnamese and Chinese-Vietnamese heritage. It has a roof made with green tiles; in front of the building is an ornate gateway with an ornate curved roof with ridge ornaments leading to the mall. Landscaping included miniature plants and trees. Inside, the mall is decorated with Vietnamese and Asian symbols such as red paper lanterns, fans, as well as statues and figurines.

Inside the mall there are about 300 shops. Cultural products for sale in the mall are primarily those made by production companies in Orange County as well as those produced in Vietnam. On the lower level there is a food court serving a variety of Vietnamese food, from bánh mì, phở, rice dishes, to sugarcane juice, Vietnamese iced coffee, or various fruit smoothies. On the upper level there are shops selling jewelry, cosmetics, and luxury goods. Also on the upper level is a shrine dedicated to the Chinese general Quan Vũ, patron saint of business and commerce.

Visitors to the mall come from many places, representing various economic backgrounds, but are primarily Vietnamese.

== Annual events ==
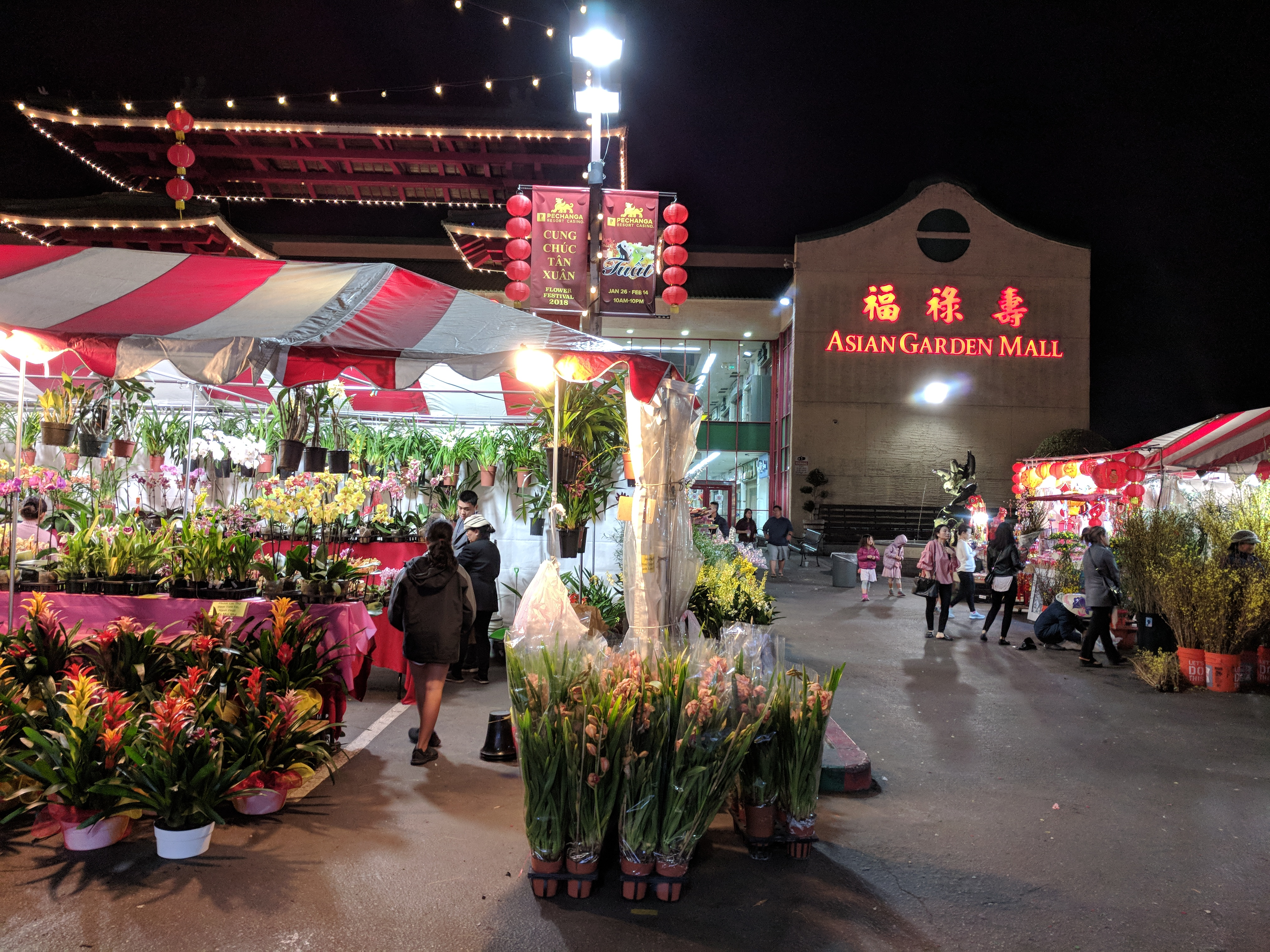
Tết flower market at Asian Garden Mall

For Tết, the portion of Bolsa Avenue passing through the mall is the starting place for the annual Tết Parade organized by the city of Westminster. Firecrackers are set off in front of the mall to signal the start of the parade. The parade has been organized since 1996, occurring on the Saturday closest to the holiday, attracting about 20,000 annual attendees and is broadcast live on local Vietnamese-language TV and radio stations.

On summer weekends, the front parking lot is turned into a night market, serving snacks and attracting younger visitors. Food served at the night market are typically Vietnamese, reminiscent of the night markets in Vietnam. The night market attracts about 3000 visitors each night.

During the Mid-Autumn Festival, variety shows are performed on the stage in front of Asian Garden Mall.

For several weeks before Tết, the parking lot in front of the mall is turned into a holiday market, with flowers and various Tết paraphernalia available for sale. Several days prior to the holiday, Little Saigon TV coordinates with the mall to organize contests inside the mall, attracting many participants. The contests include those for making bánh chưng, fruit decorating, and wearing the traditional áo dài.

== Significance ==
Asian Garden Mall is not simply a shopping center, it also serves as a symbol for the Vietnamese community in Orange County as well as in the United States. It has become a tourist destination—according to surveys from the development company, about half of mall visitors come from outside Orange County. Many community leaders describe it as the "center" or "heart" of the Vietnamese-American community, and view its role in generating and shaping community life as significant.

The symbolic role of Asian Garden Mall can be seen when many politicians, especially from the Republican Party, use the mall as the venue for rallies when campaigning for political office with Vietnamese-American voters, including Bob Dole, John McCain, and George W. Bush.

Aside from its commercial use, the mall is also used as a communal space. Many elderly people use it to meet up with friends, play Chinese chess, or drink coffee. As the most famous and most recognizable landmark in Little Saigon, Asian Garden Mall also serves as an orienting device—a central meeting place with friends before going elsewhere. Although the mall is described as the "heart" of Little Saigon, many locals try to avoid going there directly because of the crowds and difficulty finding a parking spot. Karín Aguilar-San Juan of Macalester College argues in her book about Little Saigons that the mall has become a mental destination, with possibly bigger meaning than just a shopping venue.

== Gallery ==
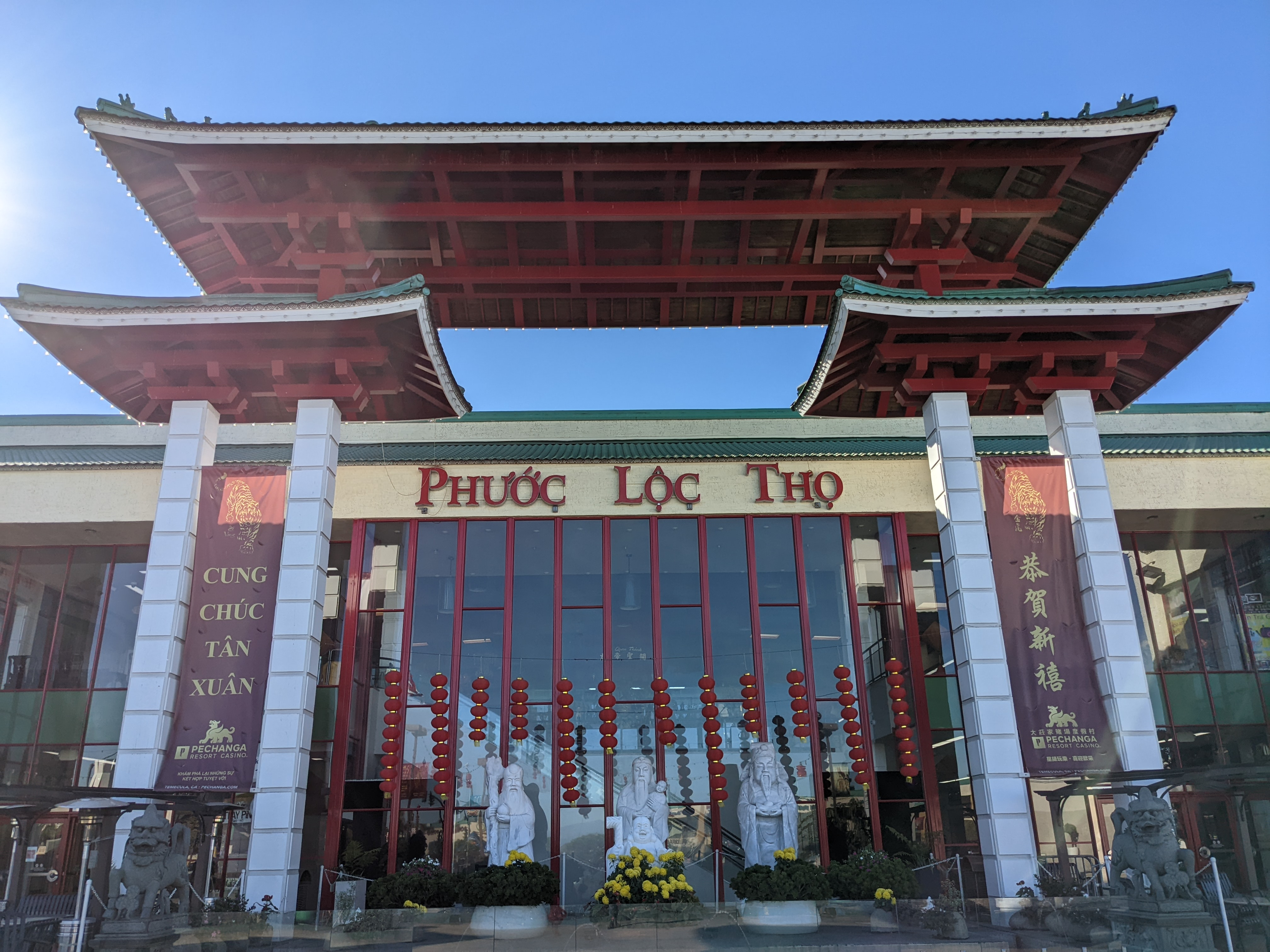
Facade in front of Asian Garden Mall

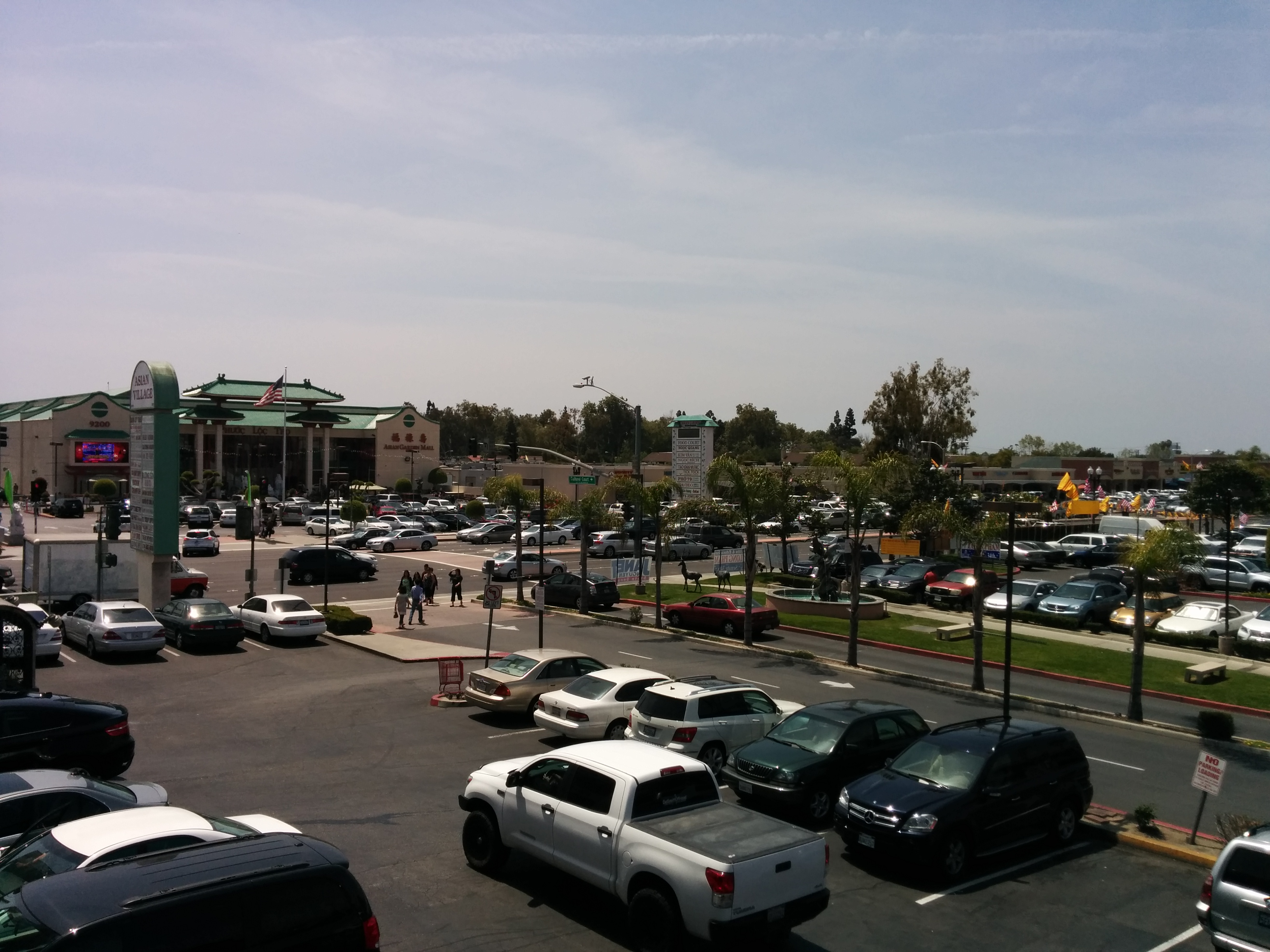
Asian Garden Mall viewed from Asian Village Mall

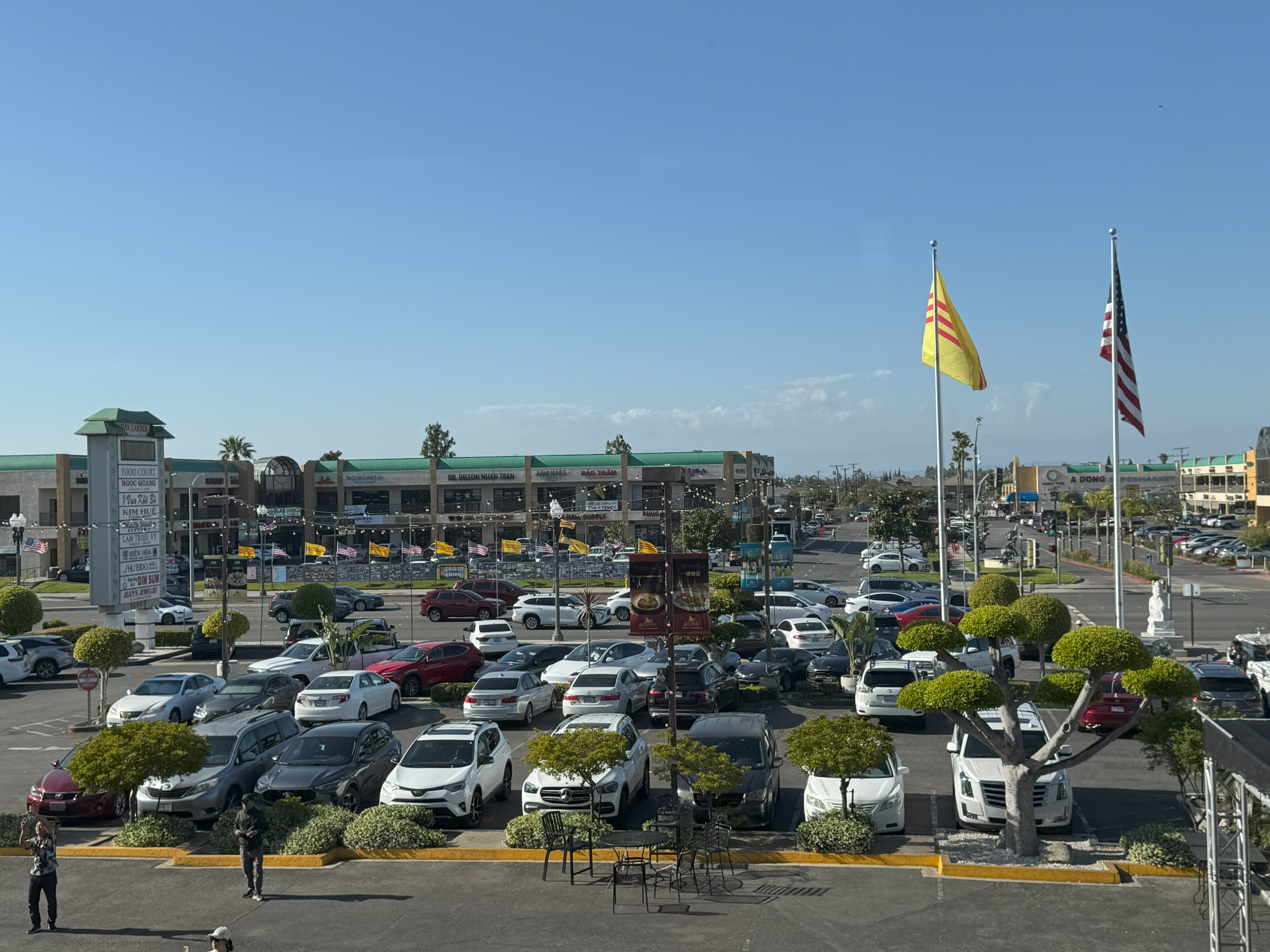
Asian Village Mall viewed from Asian Garden Mall

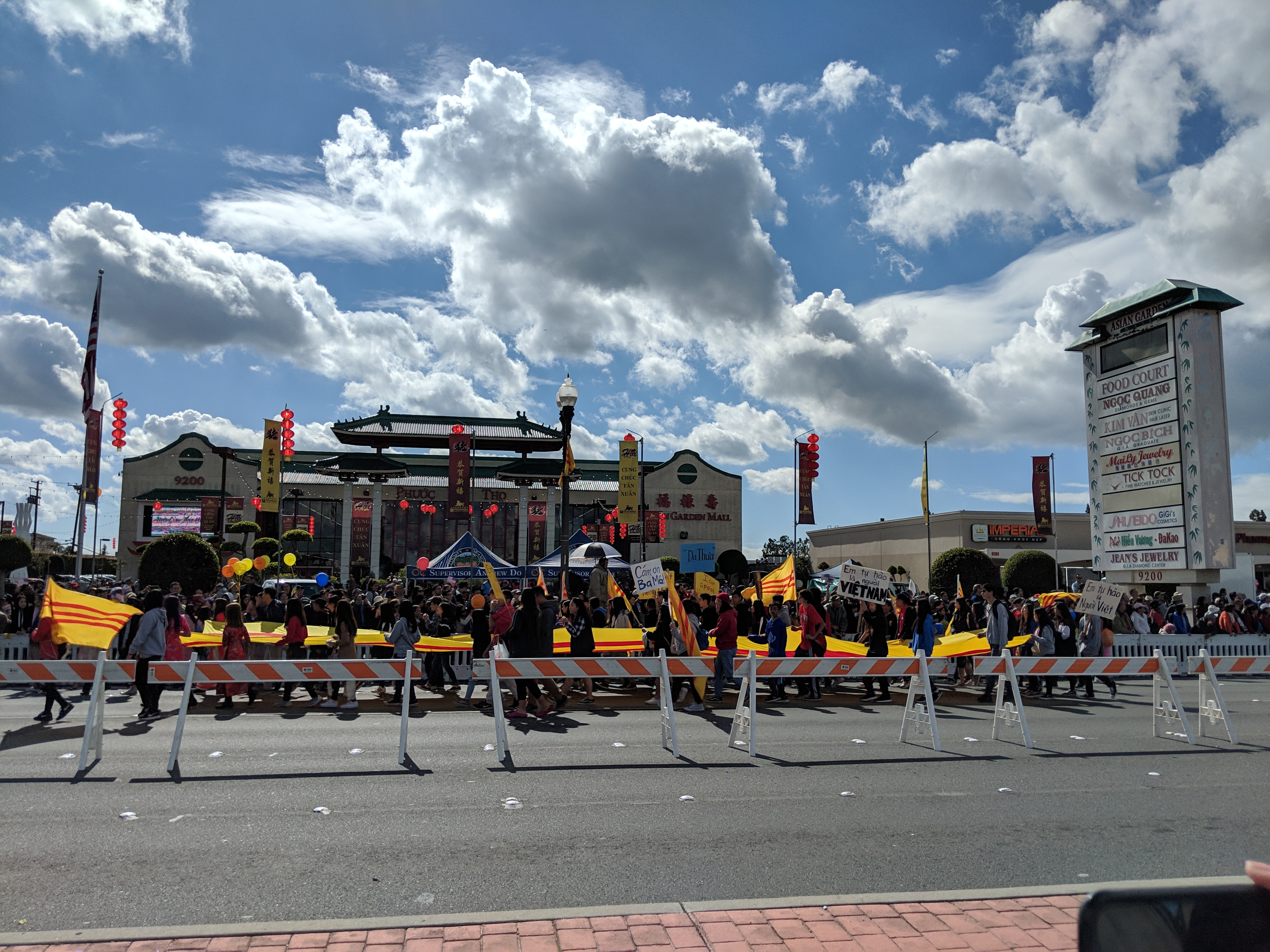
Vietnamese American youths parading in front of Asian Garden Mall

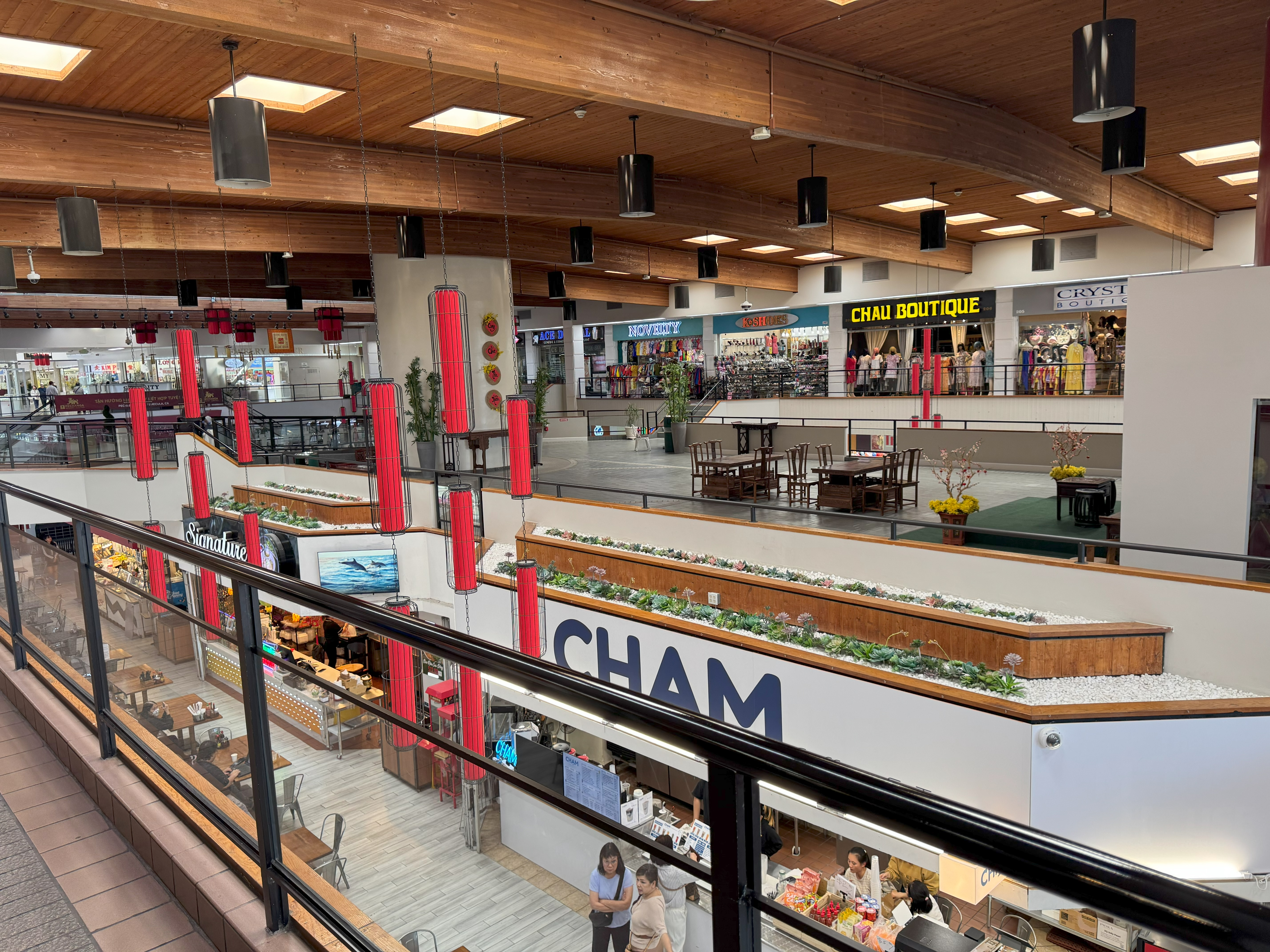
Interior of the mall

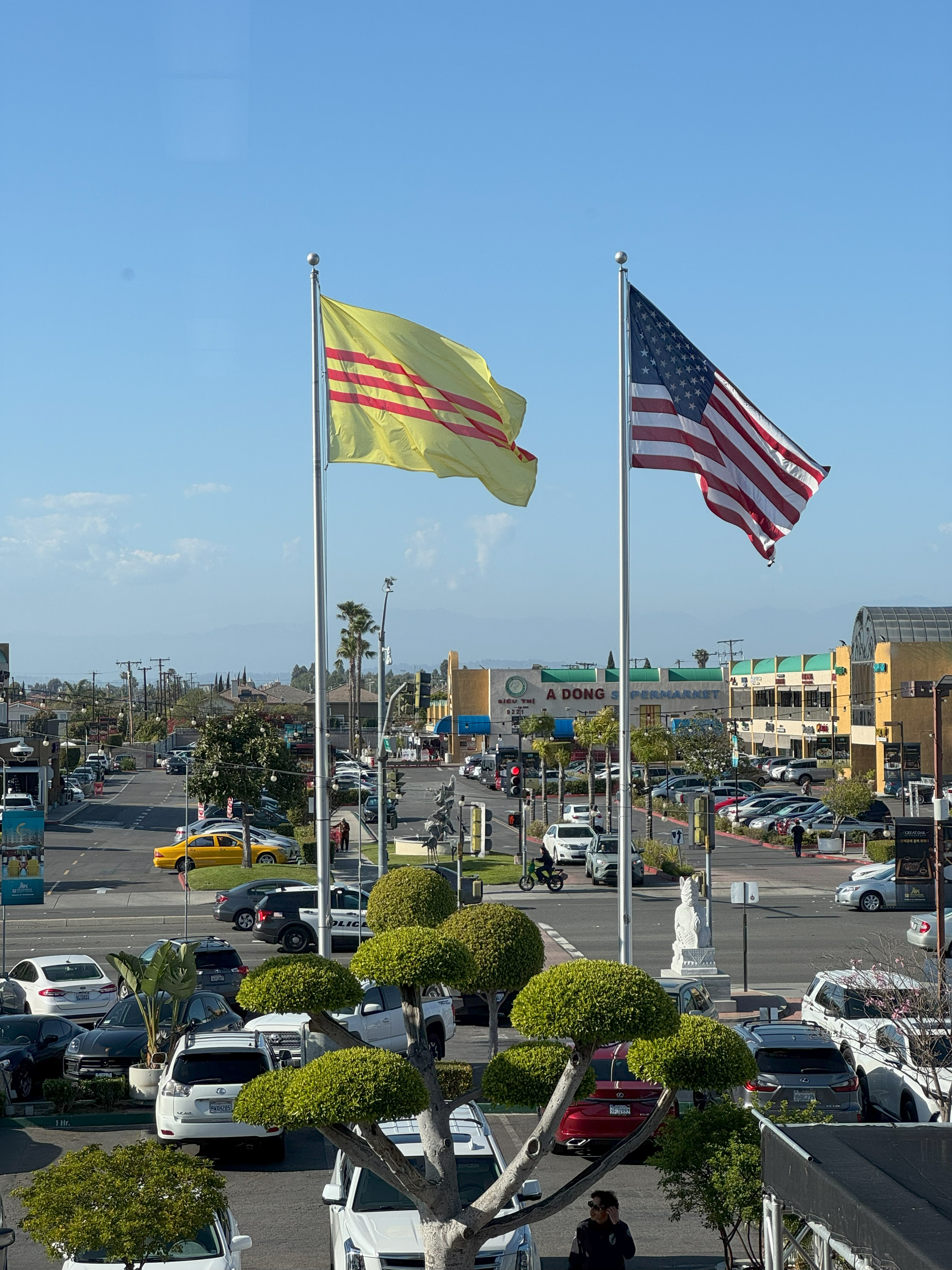
Flags of South Vietnam and the United States outside the mall

== Citations ==
=== Bibliography ===
==== Books ====
- Aguilar-San Juan, Karin (2009). Little Saigons: Staying Vietnamese in America. Minnesota University Press. pp. 7–10. ISBN 9780816654857.
- Lieu, Nhi T. (2011). The American Dream in Vietnamese. Minnesota University Press. pp. 41–48. ISBN 9780816665693.

==== Research ====
- Ha, Nam Q. (2002). Business and politics in Little Saigon, California (Bachelor). Rice University. pp. 15–34.
- Mazumda, Sanjoy; Mazumdar, Shampa; Docuyanan, Faye; McLaughlin, Colette Marie (December 2000). "Creating a Sense of Place: The Vietnamese-Americans and Little Saigon" (PDF). Journal of Environmental Psychology. 20 (4): 319–333. doi:10.1006/jevp.2000.0170.

==== News stories ====
English language

- Berg, Tom; Haire, Chris; Kopetman, Roxana (May 1, 2015). "How they became us: Orange County changed forever in the 40 years since the fall of Saigon". Orange County Register. Archived from the original on January 9, 2021.
- Dizon, Lily (June 25, 1996). "Bridge Brings Discord Instead of Harmony Into Little Saigon". Los Angeles Times.
- Ganga, Maria L.; Braun, Stephen (March 25, 1996). "Dole Vows Not to Cede California to Clinton". Los Angeles Times.
- Haire, Chris (February 15, 2016). "Little Saigon Tet Parade takes center stage". Orange County Register. Archived from the original on May 20, 2020.
- Haire, Chris (June 20, 2016). "For Little Saigon, the annual Night Market is a return to the homeland". Orange County Register. Archived from the original on June 21, 2016.
- Lee, Don (August 5, 1997). "One Man's Vision for Little Saigon". Los Angeles Times.
- Nguyen, Nathan (August 7, 2020). "As Asian Garden Mall closes indefinitely, Little Saigon adapts to outdoor shopping". Orange County Register. Archived from the original on October 1, 2020.
- Pasco, Jean O. (March 2, 2000). "A Hero's Welcome for McCain in Little Saigon". Los Angeles Times.
- Pope, John (July 3, 1996). "Developer Scraps Plan for Bridge in Little Saigon". Los Angeles Times.
- Roosevelt, Margot (April 30, 2015). "Frank Jao's story: From refugee to business mogul". Orange County Register. Archived from the original on April 22, 2017.

Vietnamese language

- Đằng Giao (July 27, 2020). "Đương đầu COVID-19, thương xá Phước Lộc Thọ cho mở 'chợ trời'". Người Việt (in Vietnamese).
- Đằng Giao (August 5, 2020). "Little Saigon, một quê hương thu nhỏ của người Việt tị nạn". Người Việt (in Vietnamese).
- Đằng Giao (January 22, 2021). "Chợ hoa Phước Lộc Thọ nhóm họp, sắc Xuân kéo về Little Saigon". Người Việt (in Vietnamese).
- Linh Nguyễn (February 2, 2019). "Năm mới xin xăm Đền Quan Thánh trong Phước Lộc Thọ". Người Việt (in Vietnamese).
- Ngọc Lan; Khôi Nguyên (January 29, 2012). "Hình ảnh Diễn hành Tết trên phố Bolsa". Người Việt (in Vietnamese).
- Phụng Linh (February 1, 2019). "Tết đến người Little Sài Gòn đi tìm chút hương Xuân" (in Vietnamese). BBC World Service.
- Tâm An (June 15, 2019). "Chợ đêm Phước Lộc Thọ, điểm hẹn ăn vặt ở Little Saigon". Người Việt (in Vietnamese).
- Titi Mary Trần (June 18, 2021). "California mở cửa toàn phần; cộng đồng Việt trở lại bình thường 'trong cẩn thận'". Voice of America (in Vietnamese).
- Văn Lan (October 24, 2017). "Little Saigon TV và TX Phước Lộc Thọ tổ chức Tết Trung Thu cho cộng đồng". Người Việt (in Vietnamese).
- Văn Lan (January 21, 2020). "Phước Lộc Thọ đón Xuân bằng cuộc thi áo dài, gói bánh chưng, bày mâm ngũ quả". Người Việt (in Vietnamese).
