= Danh Quach =

Quách Nhứt Danh, often referred to as Danh Quach or Danh Nhut Quach, is a Vietnamese American businessman and one of the "pioneers" of Orange County's Little Saigon.

== Early life ==
He was a pharmacist in Saigon, Vietnam, but fled in 1975 with his wife, nine-year-old son, seven-year-old daughter, and sister, after the Fall of Saigon brought the Vietnam War to an end. He first settled in Arkansas' Fort Chaffee region before moving to Lincoln, Nebraska, to attend pharmacy school again at the University of Nebraska Medical Center, from which he graduated in May 1977. Following his graduation, he lived briefly in Missouri and Connecticut, but eventually gravitated to Westminster, California, due to the warmer weather and friends who had preceded him there.

== Business in Southern California ==
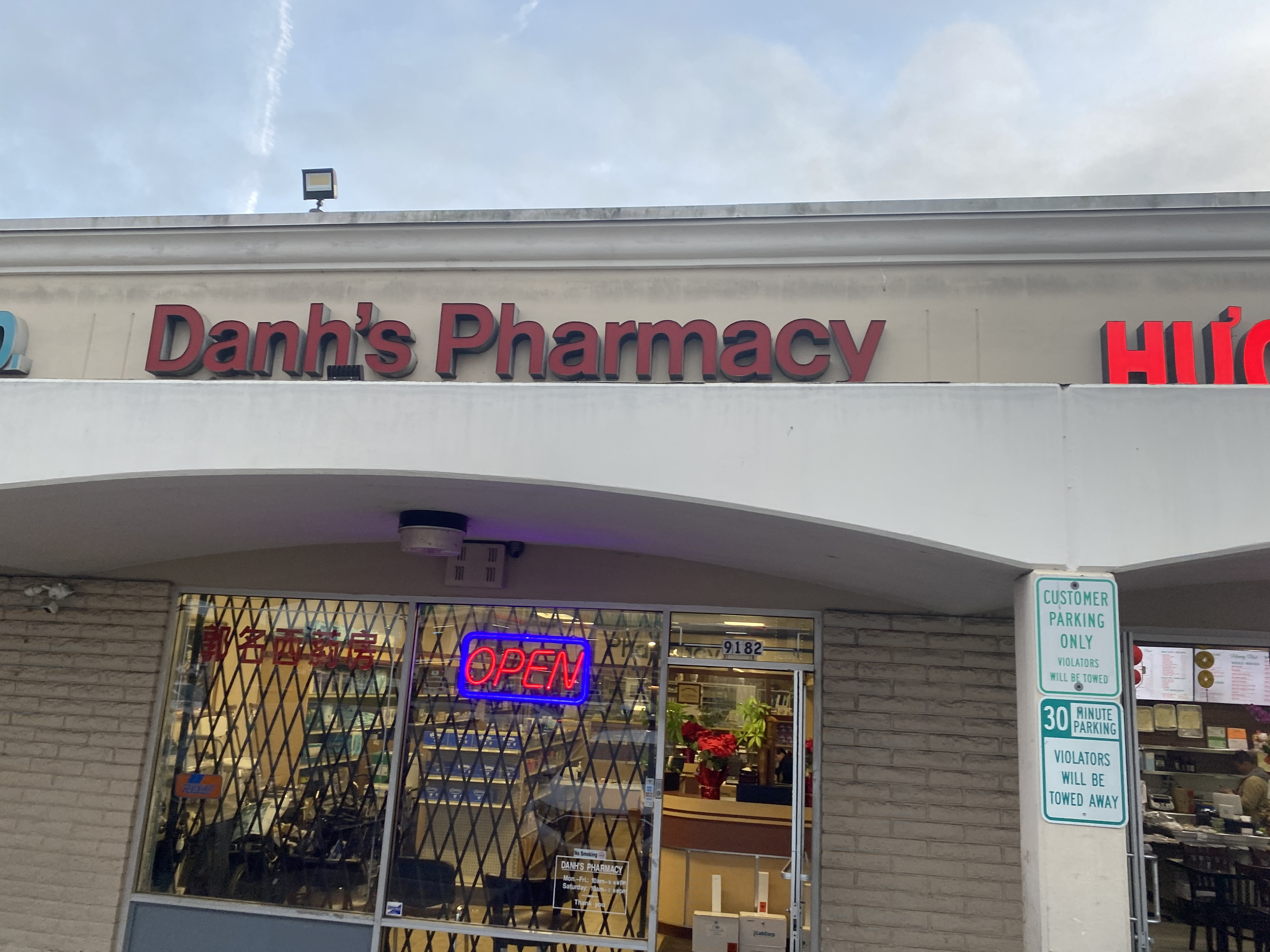
Danh’s Pharmacy in 2026

He opened his pharmacy on Bolsa Avenue in Orange County, California, in 1978, selling not only medicine, but electrical appliances, bicycle seats, and a variety of other goods; less than 10 years after his arrival, he had achieved financial success. He soon branched out into other businesses, including freight forwarding; by 1988, he was sending 10,000 pounds of goods to Vietnam each month, a business fueled by the U.S. embargo against Vietnam, which led Vietnamese Americans to send much-needed supplies to their relatives who remained in Vietnam. By 1989, he had taken money earned from his small business success to become a real estate investor; his pharmacy would become the heart of Little Saigon. Eventually, he shrank his original store to about a third of its former size in order to make room for his son to move his medical practice in next door.

== Flag controversy ==
Beginning in January 1999, he became involved in a political controversy when he served a 30-day eviction notice to a tenant in a shopping center he owned for inciting a nuisance there. The tenant was displaying a photo of Ho Chi Minh and a flag of Vietnam in the window of his video store; angered by the store owner's pro-Communist display, local residents protested outside of the store for four days before a judge ruled that the store owner had to take down the picture and flag. However, a Superior Court judge reversed the decision the following month. The tenant required an escort of one hundred police officers to take him to his store the following day and protect him from protesters while he rehung the flag. The tenant, disappointed that his landlord, the police, and the city of Westminster had "failed to protect [his] free speech rights", filed another lawsuit against them a year later.
