= Little Saigon =

Ethnic enclaves of expatriate Vietnamese in some cities

- Little Saigon; Vietnam Town
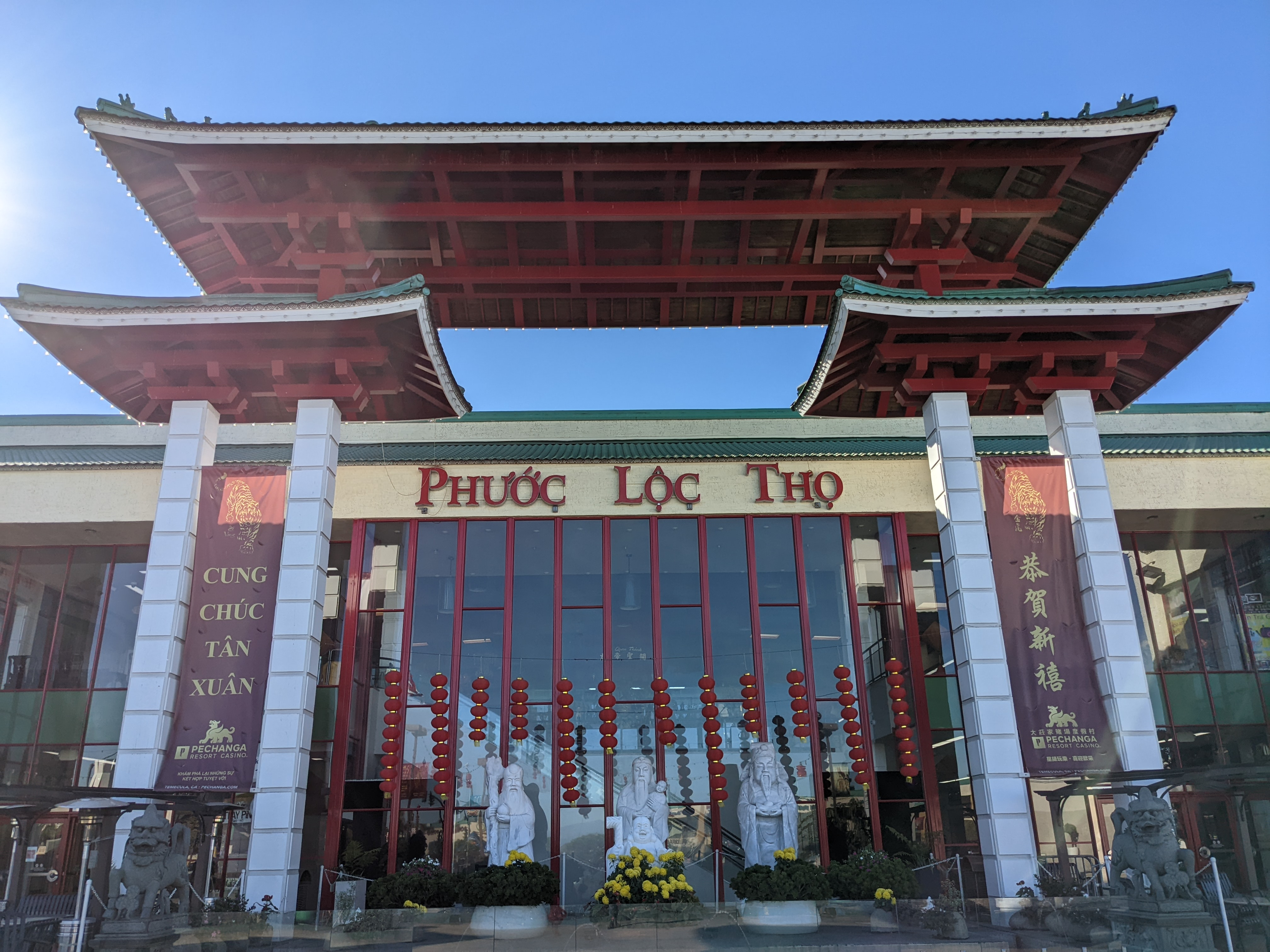
- Asian Garden Mall façade in Westminster
- Vietnamese alphabet: Tiểu Sài Gòn; Sài Gòn nhỏ Phố người Việt; Khu phố Việt Nam

Little Saigon (Vietnamese: Sài Gòn nhỏ or Tiểu Sài Gòn) is a name given to ethnic enclaves of overseas Vietnamese, mainly in the United States. Saigon is the name of the capital of the former South Vietnam, where a large number of first-generation Vietnamese immigrants emigrating to the United States originate.

Around 125,000 Vietnamese escaped Vietnam and immigrated to the United States right after the Fall of Saigon to avoid communist occupation in 1975, other hundreds of thousands followed; today, Vietnamese Americans total nearly 2.4 million. The most well-established and largest Vietnamese-American enclaves, not all of which are called Little Saigon, are in Orange County, California; San Jose, California; and Houston, Texas. Relatively smaller communities also exist, including the comparatively nascent Vietnamese commercial districts in San Francisco, San Diego, Atlanta, Sacramento, Philadelphia, Denver, Oklahoma City, New Orleans, the Dallas–Fort Worth metroplex (Haltom City, Arlington, and Garland), Falls Church, Virginia, Orlando, and Seattle.

== United States ==
=== California ===
==== Orange County ====
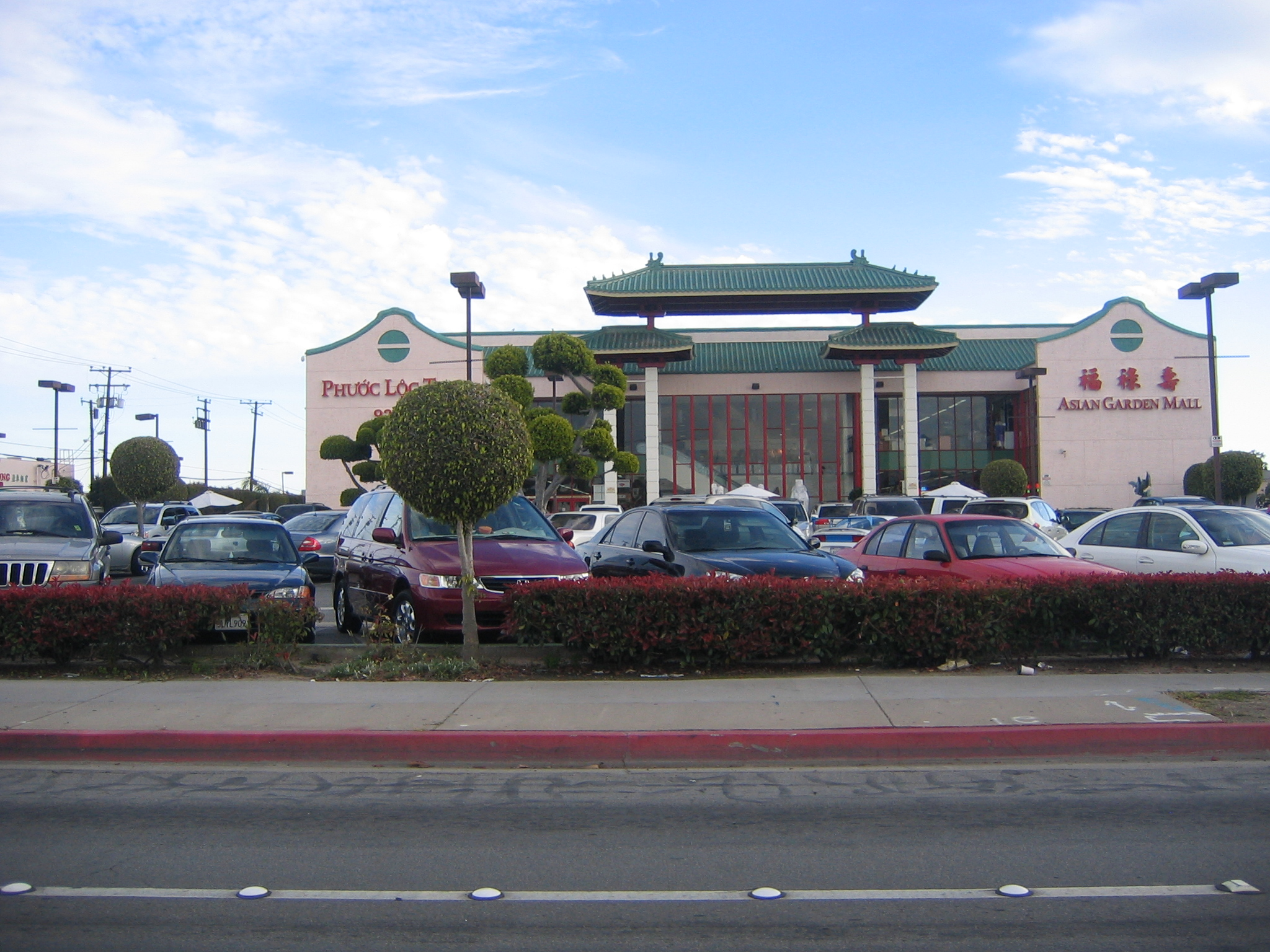
Phước Lộc Thọ, known in English as Asian Garden Mall, the first Vietnamese-American business center in Little Saigon, Orange County

The oldest, largest, and most prominent Little Saigon is centered in Orange County, California, where over 189,000 Vietnamese Americans reside. With other Southern California counties, this region constitutes the largest Vietnamese American (VA) population outside of Vietnam. The community originally started emerging in Westminster, and quickly spread to the adjacent city of Garden Grove. Today, these two cities rank as the highest concentration of Vietnamese-Americans of any cities in the United States at 37.1% and 31.1%, respectively (according to the 2011 American Community Survey).

About 45 miles (72 km) south of Los Angeles, Westminster was once a predominantly white middle-class suburban city of Orange County with ample farmland, but the city later experienced a decline by the 1970s. Since 1978, the nucleus of Little Saigon has long been Bolsa Avenue, where early pioneers Danh Quach and Frank Jao established businesses. During that year, the well-known Nguoi Viet Daily News also began publishing from a home in Garden Grove. Other new Vietnamese-American arrivals soon revitalized the area by opening their own businesses in old, formerly white-owned storefronts, and investors constructed large shopping centers containing a mix of businesses. The Vietnamese community and businesses later spread into adjacent Garden Grove, Midway City, Fountain Valley, Stanton, Anaheim, and Santa Ana.

In Orange County, Little Saigon is now a wide, spread-out community dotted with myriad suburban-style strip malls containing a mixture of Vietnamese and Chinese-Vietnamese businesses. It is located southwest of Disneyland between the State Route 22 and Interstate 405. However, the main focus of Little Saigon is Bolsa Avenue (where Asian Garden Mall and Little Saigon Plaza are considered the heart), which runs through Westminster; the street was officially designated Little Saigon by the city council of Westminster in the late 1980s. The borders of Little Saigon can be considered to be Trask Avenue and W McFadden Avenue on the north and south and Euclid Street and Magnolia Street on the east and west, respectively. About three-quarters of the population in this area are Vietnamese.

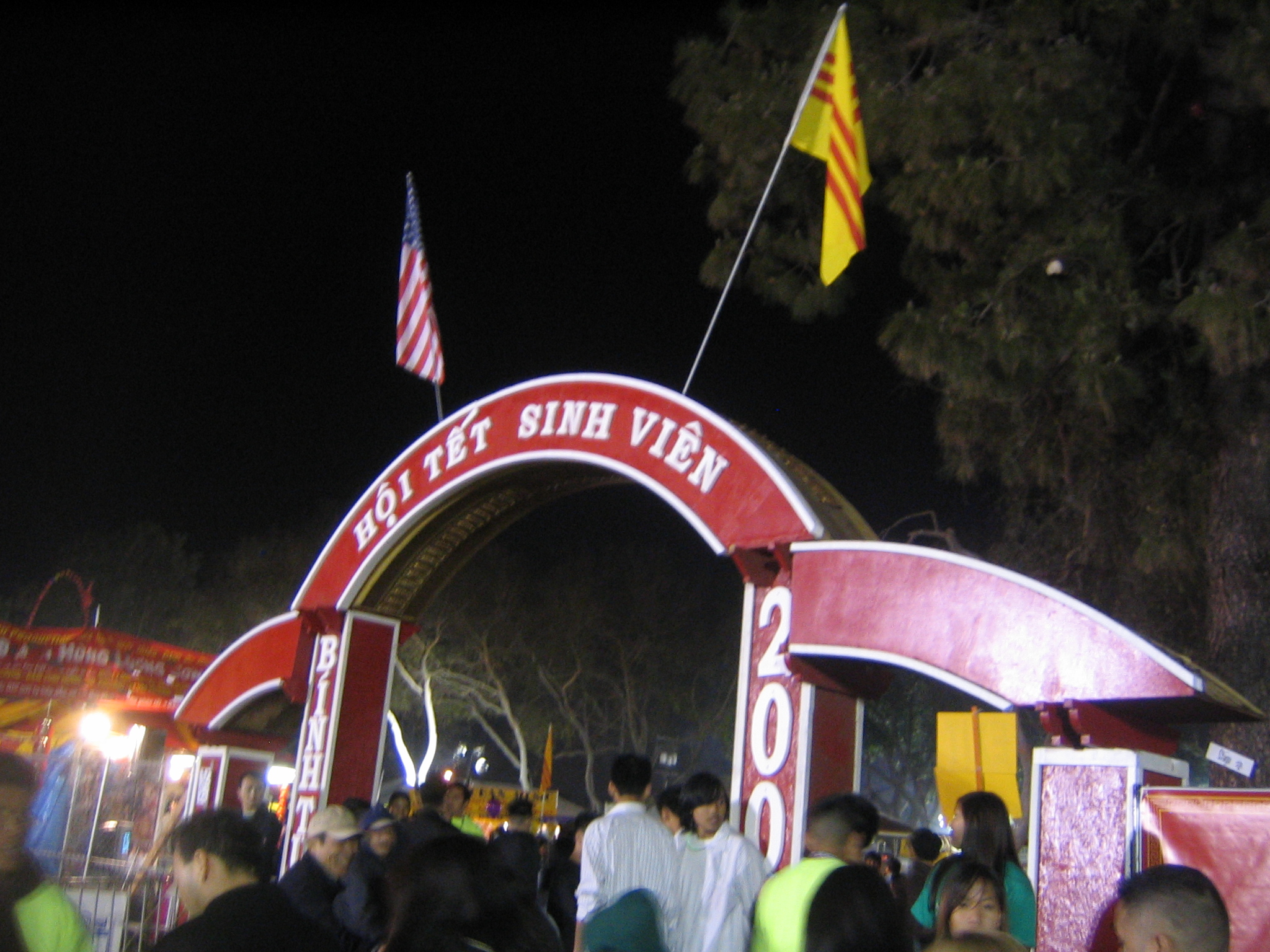
Tết Festival in Little Saigon, Orange County, California

Westminster is generally considered the main cultural center of the Vietnamese American community with several Vietnamese-language television stations, radio stations, and newspapers originating from Little Saigon and adjacent areas. At least one radio station broadcast 24 hours a day in Vietnamese and 4 television substations broadcasting in Vietnamese 24 hours a day as of 2009, and several newspapers serve the Vietnamese-American community. Little Saigon has also emerged as the prominent center of the Vietnamese pop music industry with several recording studios, and with a recording industry many times larger than in Vietnam itself. Vietnamese music recorded in Westminster are distributed and sold in Vietnamese communities throughout the United States and in Australia, France, and Germany as well as illegally in Vietnam.

Garden Grove Park is the location of an annual Vietnamese Lunar New Year festival held in late January - early February known as Tết. Small amusement park rides, dances, and contests are held in Garden Grove Park which is across the street from Bolsa Grande High School grounds and is hosted by the Union of Vietnamese Student Association (UVSA). Since 2013, the annual festival has been relocated to the OC Fair Grounds in Costa Mesa.

The Vietnamese American population has now begun to diffuse from Little Saigon to traditionally working-class Hispanic cities, such as Santa Ana, and southward to professional middle-class predominantly white cities such as Costa Mesa, Huntington Beach, Irvine, and Orange. Over the years, the vibrant community of Little Saigon has experienced frequent openings and closures of small mom-and-pop Vietnamese businesses, resulting in sights of some abandoned strip plazas. The changing landscape of the Vietnamese American population would bring a more multicultural flavor to Orange County, but as with Chinatowns, could potentially eliminate its identity as a "Little Saigon" as the population of foreign-born Vietnamese old-timers declines and more younger generations of Vietnamese American families attune to mainstream American culture (especially with a preference for fashionable malls over the Vietnamese ethnic malls in Little Saigon) and move on to affluent communities further away from the Little Saigon area.

==== San Diego ====
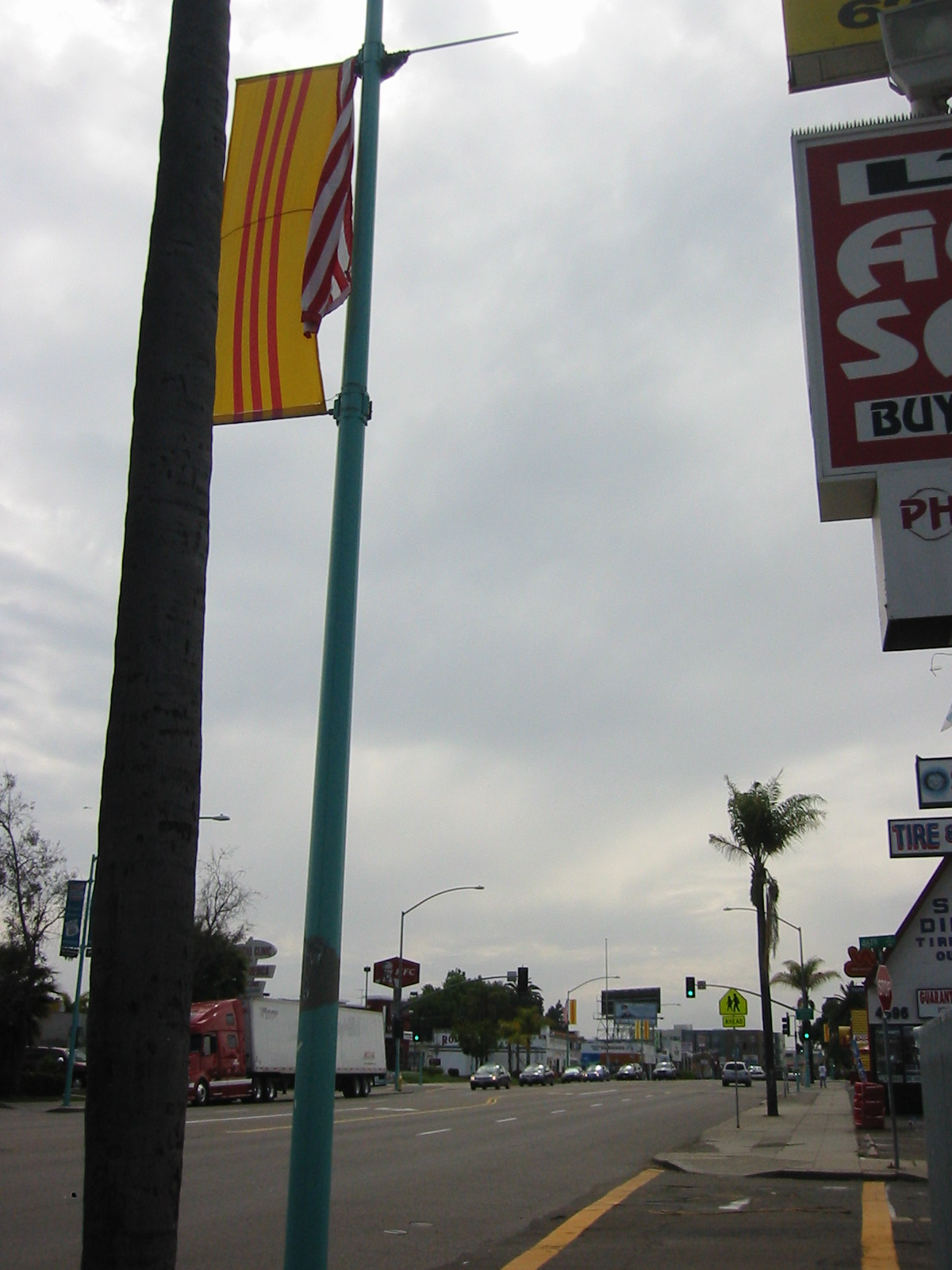
Vietnamese Heritage flag displayed along El Cajon Boulevard in San Diego (April 2010), commemorating the fall of Saigon and the arrival of Vietnamese refugees to the US.

When the "first wave" of Vietnamese immigrants started to arrive in 1981, many settled in the communities adjacent to San Diego State University, such as City Heights and Talmadge, better known as East San Diego. As families and individuals became more affluent however, many relocated to other communities in the city: Linda Vista, Clairemont, Serra Mesa, etc. (Central San Diego) and what was then brand-new tract communities such as Mira Mesa, Rancho Penasquitos, Rancho Bernardo, etc.

With a population of about 50,000, the San Diego metropolitan area ranks as one of the largest Vietnamese communities in the United States. Because of the Vietnamese population's unique migration patterns in the city, it does not have a huge concentration of Vietnamese businesses in a particular area like other metropolitan areas (e.g., Westminster, San Jose, Houston, etc.) Still, there are three notable Vietnamese business districts in the San Diego region: Mira Mesa Boulevard (North San Diego), El Cajon Boulevard (East San Diego), and Convoy Street/Linda Vista Road (Central San Diego).

On June 4, 2013, City Council approved Little Saigon Cultural and Commercial District in City Heights, San Diego, which is a six-block section of El Cajon Boulevard from Euclid to Highland avenues. On February 1, 2019, Little Saigon signs were revealed to be installed on Interstate 15.

==== San Gabriel Valley ====
Due to the large influx and presence of relatively poor ethnic Chinese refugees from Vietnam in the 1980s (which also coincided with the arrival of immigrant elites from Taiwan and Hong Kong), the San Gabriel Valley region of Los Angeles has another important concentration of Vietnamese in Southern California. While not generally referred to as "Little Saigon", the stretch of Garvey Avenue in the working-class barrios of Rosemead, South El Monte, and El Monte have a relatively heavy but scattered collection of businesses owned mainly by majority ethnic Chinese Vietnamese with a growing number of ethnic Vietnamese residents and business owners as well. Many of these businesses are housed in tiny strip malls while others occupy freestanding, aging buildings. These Vietnamese businesses are very gradually replacing businesses owned by Hispanics.

Rosemead is the Vietnamese center of the San Gabriel Valley. One particular shopping center in Rosemead, called Diamond Square, is anchored by the Taiwanese American chain 99 Ranch Market (now closed) and contains various Chinese Vietnamese small businesses and a food court catering to local Asians. The Diamond Square is now closed, replaced by The Square anchored by Korean American stores. The 99 Ranch Market is replaced by the Square Supermarket.

It remains a major hub for working-class Vietnamese and Mainland Chinese expatriates residing in the area. Many Vietnamese of ethnic Chinese origin also tend to own various businesses - especially supermarkets, restaurants, beauty parlors, and auto repair shops - in the main general mixed-Chinese commercial thoroughfares of Garvey Avenue in Monterey Park, California and Valley Boulevard in Alhambra, California, San Gabriel, California, and Rosemead. There are already several phở and bánh mì eateries represented along Valley Boulevard.

The Sriracha hot sauce manufacturer Huy Fong Foods (known for its rooster logo and found in countless Vietnamese restaurants) is owned by a Chinese Vietnamese refugee named David Tran and was originally located in Chinatown, Los Angeles but it relocated to its larger facility in Rosemead.

In 2005, John Tran became the first Vietnamese American to be elected to a seat on the city council of Rosemead. Since 2006, he has been the mayor of the city, a position that is held by rotation among the council members.

==== San Jose ====
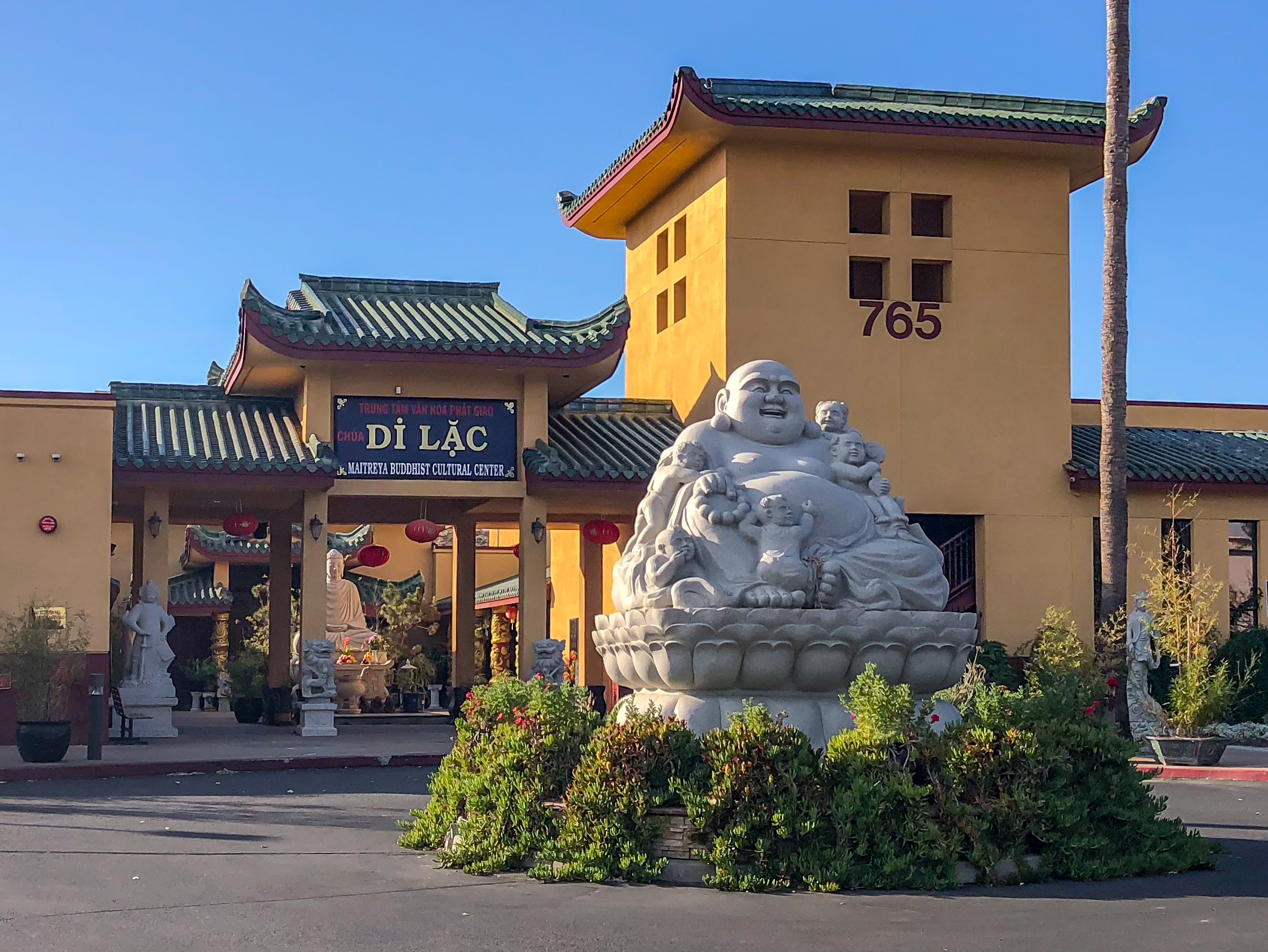
Chùa Di Lặc Buddhist Temple in Little Saigon, San Jose.

Comprising over 180,000 residents, about 10.6% of the population, (as of the 2010 U.S. Census) San Jose's Vietnamese community is comparable to the one in Orange County. San Jose has more Vietnamese residents than any single city outside of Vietnam. Vietnamese-language radio programs from Orange County are rebroadcast in the region, though San Jose does contain locally produced Vietnamese-language radio and TV stations such as Que Huong Media, Vien Thao, and Vietoday TV. Although Viet Mercury, the Vietnamese-language edition of the San Jose Mercury News, is now discontinued, many other publications offer Vietnamese literature enjoyed by the community, such as Thang Mo and Trieu Thanh magazines as well as newspapers from Calitoday, Viet Bao, Thoi Bao Daily News (now defunct), and Viet Nam Nhat Bao (Vietnam Daily News). Several strip malls on Tully Road (stretching from Senter Road to Quimby Road) and Senter Road (from Capitol Expressway to Burke Street by Costco), cater to Vietnamese tastes, such as Lion Plaza on the intersection of Tully and King (anchored by Lion Supermarket) and Carribbees Center on Senter and Lewis (anchored by Cho Senter Market, now Lee's Supermarket).

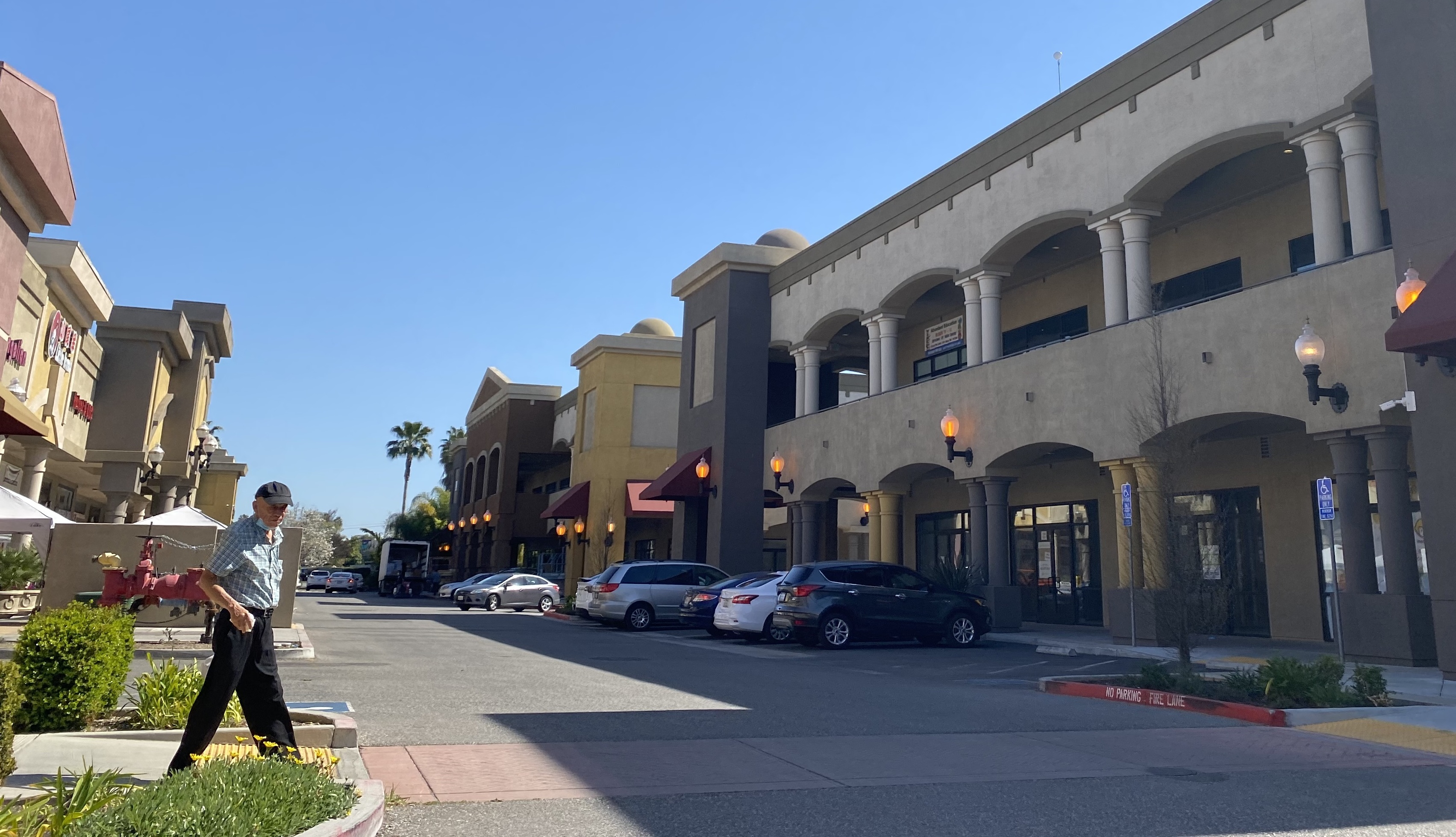
Little Saigon, San Jose.

The epicenter of the Vietnamese-American community of San Jose, however, is on Story Road (stretching from Senter Road to McLaughlin Avenue), home to the popular Grand Century Mall and Vietnam Town (both shopping malls are owned by Chinese-Vietnamese real estate developer Lap Tang) and is officially designated by the San Jose City Council as "Little Saigon". Like its counterpart in Orange County, a freeway offramp sign was placed in 2013 on Highway 101 and Freeway 280, designating the Story Road (from Highway 101) and McLaughlin Avenue (from Freeway 280) exits to Little Saigon. Lee's Sandwiches, (a Vietnamese bánh mì sandwich chain eatery) as well as the phở chain, Pho Hoa Restaurant, had their first locations here in San Jose. Due to the ethnic diversity of the city, where Vietnamese-Americans here live side by side with other ethnic minorities such as Mexican-Americans, Filipino-Americans, and Indian-Americans, the Vietnamese community in San Jose is more fully integrated into the local community.

The Vietnamese community of San Jose has been politically divided over the naming of the business district, with various groups favoring "Little Saigon", "New Saigon", and "Vietnamese Business District". Non-Vietnamese businesses and residents, as well as the San Jose Hispanic Chamber of Commerce have also opposed the name "Little Saigon". In November 2007, the San Jose City Council voted 8–3 to choose the compromise name "Saigon Business District", resulting in ongoing protest, debate, and an effort to recall city council member Madison Nguyen, who proposed the name "Saigon Business District". On March 4, 2008, after a public meeting in which more than 1000 "Little Saigon" supporters participated, the city council voted 11–1 to rescind the name "Saigon Business District", but stopped short of renaming it. The recall of Nguyen failed in March 2009.

San Jose also granted the building of the Viet Museum in Kelley Park next to the City Historic Museum. The Viet Museum had its grand opening August 25, 2007.

==== Sacramento ====
With a large and growing Vietnamese American population, in February 2010, a stretch of Stockton Boulevard in Sacramento from Florin Road to Fruitridge Road has been officially named "Little Saigon". Although settlement of Vietnamese refugees began during the 1980s, large numbers of Vietnamese have moved from the San Jose area to the Sacramento area since the late 1990s and 2000s (decade) (especially after the dot-com bust in Silicon Valley). People were drawn to the area by lower housing prices, lower cost of living, and Vietnamese and Chinese enclaves. The large Asian supermarket Shun Fat Supermarket (a small Southern California-based chain owned by a Chinese Vietnamese American) opened in 2000 to cater to the local community and anchors Pacific Plaza. One of the First Vietnamese-Chinese owned supermarkets was Vinh Phat Supermarket. SF Supermarket is a prominent fixture at the intersections of 65th and Stockton Boulevard. This center also houses Huong Lan, which is famous for Vietnamese banh mi sandwiches. In 2010, a new 99 Ranch Market opened on Florin Road. The strip of Stockton Boulevard has a great number of Vietnamese and Chinese restaurants and many places for ethnic foods, such as phở and boba. There are nearby Vietnamese Chinese shopping centers planned for development, including Little Saigon Plaza (to be anchored by a supermarket) that is to be developed by prominent San Jose-based Vietnamese American developers. Other current shopping centers sport names such as Little Vietnam and Pacific Rim Plaza. As a testament to the area's burgeoning Vietnamese community, the Southgate branch (66th Avenue, near Stockton Boulevard) of Sacramento Public library carries a large collection of Vietnamese materials.

==== San Francisco ====
In early 2004, San Francisco officially designated Larkin Street between Eddy and O'Farrell streets as "Little Saigon" (Sài Gòn Nhỏ). Located in the Tenderloin district where 2,000 of the city's 13,000 Vietnamese-American residents live, the two-block stretch is more than 80% Vietnamese-owned. Unlike San Jose, with its larger ethnic Vietnamese population, the ethnic Chinese from Vietnam are well represented in San Francisco due to self-segregation. Banners and directional signs have already been posted. A formal symbolic entrance was erected in July 2008, akin to those for San Francisco's Japantown and Chinatown (albeit smaller).

==== Oakland ====
The region stretching from 1st Avenue to 23rd Avenue in Oakland, California's San Antonio district Eastlake neighborhood is known as Little Saigon of Oakland. The local Vietnamese Chamber of Commerce estimates that there are approximately 8,000 people of Vietnamese origin or descent living in Oakland, largely concentrated in Eastlake. Vietnamese businesses are concentrated along International Boulevard and East 12th Street in the district, and include Oakland's Sun Hop Fat market, a fruit and grocery store that was one of the first. Currently there are dozens of Vietnamese-owned businesses in the area that serve the Vietnamese immigrant community, including restaurants, print shops, jewelry stores, and a karaoke machine store. Shop signs are typically bilingually English and Vietnamese. Yellow Vietnamese Freedom flags and the signs of Welcome to Little Saigon Oakland are visible everywhere, as are yellow and red Vietnamese silk flowers in the shape of cherry blossoms called Mai.

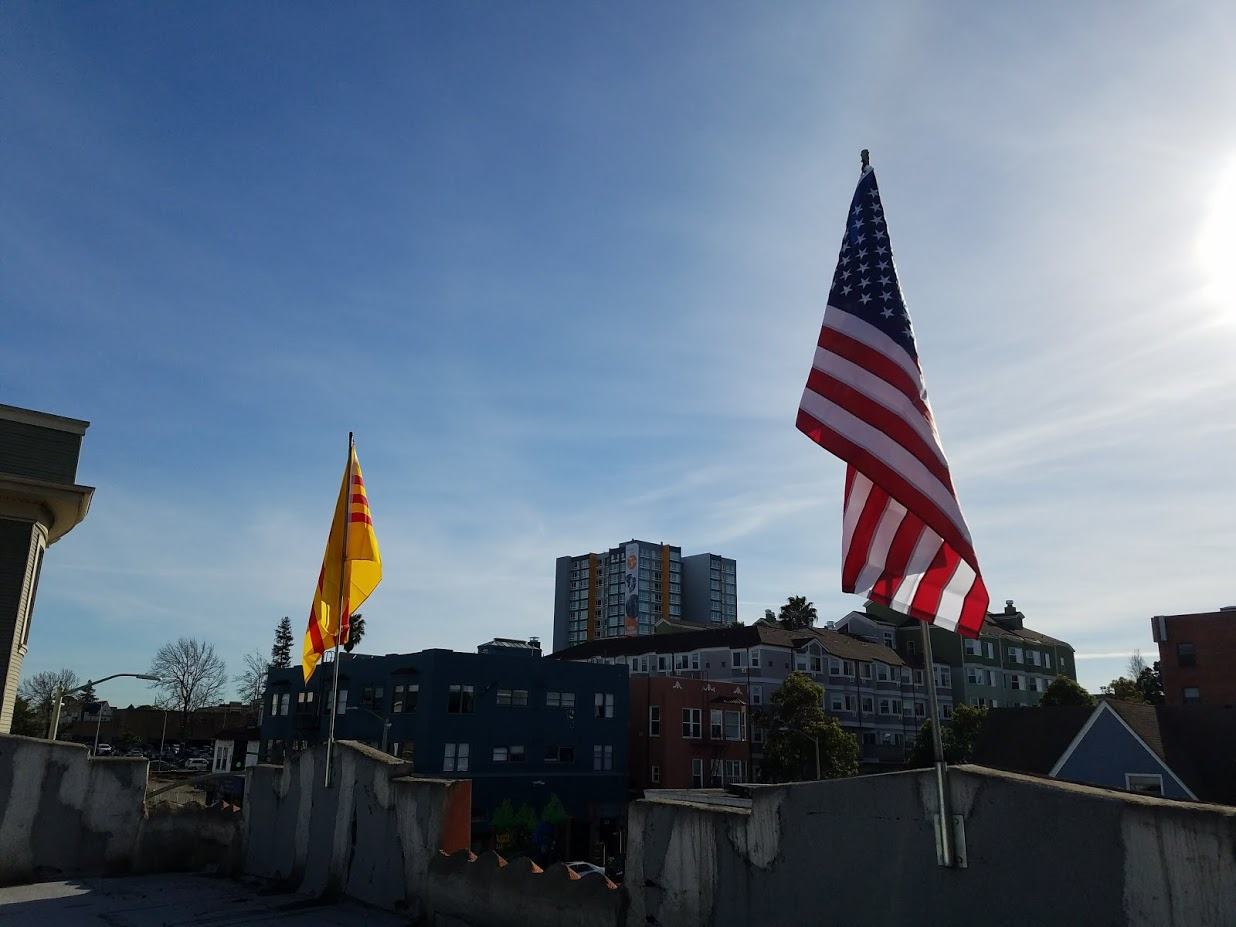
South Vietnamese yellow flags are visible everywhere in Oakland's Little Saigon.

In 2019, local business owners lobbied for the formal city recognition of the area as “Little Saigon” and began working on a proposal for the creation of a Business Improvement District (BID)—a region in which local businesses and sometimes additional property owners pay a tax surcharge or mandatory fee to fund neighborhood events, clean-up efforts, local beautification efforts, and marketing campaigns to promote the district as such rather than individual businesses within it. The 2019-2021 city council budget allocated $125,000 for BID feasibility studies in both Eastlake and Oakland's Chinatown.

The Oakland Vietnamese Chamber of Commerce organizes the annual Vietnamese Mid-Autumn Festival, in Clinton Square Park at the intersection of East 12th Street and 7th Avenue. The Oakland Vietnamese Mid-Autumn Festival occurs alongside many Mid-Autumn Festivals ("Asian New Year") celebrations for different East Asian communities across the San Francisco Bay Area.

In the summer of 2021, the Oakland Vietnamese Chamber of Commerce, along with Good Good Eatz (a program funded by the East Bay Asian Local Development Corporation to promote ethnic food districts) and Pokémon Go developer Niantic organized a "Summer Fest" centered on Pokémon Go events and local food, along with retro video games made available by the Museum of Art and Digital Entertainment and COVID-19 testing and vaccinations.

=== Colorado ===
A growing Vietnamese commercial district has emerged on Federal Boulevard between the Far East Center shopping complex between West Alameda and West Mississippi Avenues in Denver, Colorado, with Vietnamese cuisine eateries and various businesses. With the leadership of business owners, the Vietnamese American Community of Colorado, Denver Asian Pacific Commission and Denver City Councilman Paul Lopez, the Little Saigon Business District was formed honoring its rich Vietnamese culture in 2014. There is also a growing Vietnamese population in Aurora, Colorado, specifically in an area bordered to the north by Alameda Avenue, to the south by E. Hampden Avenue, to the east by Chambers Road, and to the west by Havana Street. There are currently about 21,000 Vietnamese people living in the Denver-Aurora-Boulder Metro Area.

=== Florida ===
A thriving Vietnamese quarter called "Little Saigon" exists in the Colonialtown district of Orlando, Florida. The neighborhood has become a landmark in the city of Orlando and consists of a growing number of restaurants, groceries, and Vietnamese professional offices that serve the local Vietnamese community with everything from taxes to medical and dental care. Stores supply Asian pop culture to the community in the form of karaoke bars, bubble tea shops, Vietnamese video and music shops, and stores featuring candies and collectibles from across Asia. The heart of the district is the intersection of East Colonial Drive / Highway 50 and Mills Avenue, also known as the "Vi-Mi" district.

The Orlando Vietnamese community has its roots in war refugees seeking a new life in America after the fall of Saigon. Notable pro-democracy activists, such as Thuong Nguyen Foshee, who was just recently released from prison in Vietnam, call Orlando their home.

The Vietnamese Community in Orlando, along with institutions like Chua Bao An, St. Philip Phan Van Minh Church, Vietnamese Baptist Church, and groups such as The Vietnamese Association of Central Florida, strive to maintain their heritage as well as share their culture with the rest of Orlando. Annual events, such as the numerous Tet New Year Celebrations at the Central Florida Fairgrounds and across the city, help spread Vietnamese culture and promote diversity throughout Orlando.

=== Georgia ===
There are many Vietnamese businesses located in the mixed-Asian – that is, co-existing with ethnic Korean and Chinese businesses – commercial and cultural strip of Buford Highway in Doraville and Chamblee, which are working-class suburbs in DeKalb County north of Atlanta. Although a fair number of post-war Vietnamese refugees settled in Atlanta earlier, many Vietnamese Americans from California and other parts of the United States have been relocating into the Atlanta area to establish a fairly large presence since the 1990s. Metropolitan Atlanta is home to one of the fastest-growing Vietnamese populations in the world.

=== Gulf Coast ===
It is estimated that there are 40,000 Vietnamese-Americans in the Gulf Coast, and 1 in every 4 fishermen from the area is Vietnamese-American.

==== Alabama ====
Vietnamese-Americans make up one-third of the population in the fishing hamlet of Bayou La Batre. A majority of the community work in the seafood industry, while a smaller percentage work in the shipbuilding industry. The eastern side of the city is nicknamed "Little Vietnam" due to the high number of Vietnamese-American residents. Vietnamese businesses have been sustained by the social integration of the Vietnamese and mainstream cultures. The city also sees, within the Vietnamese American community, a large sub-community of Amerasians. Many were brought to the US through the Amerasian Homecoming Act and relocated to the area due to similarities in environment and industry to what they were accustomed to.

==== Louisiana ====
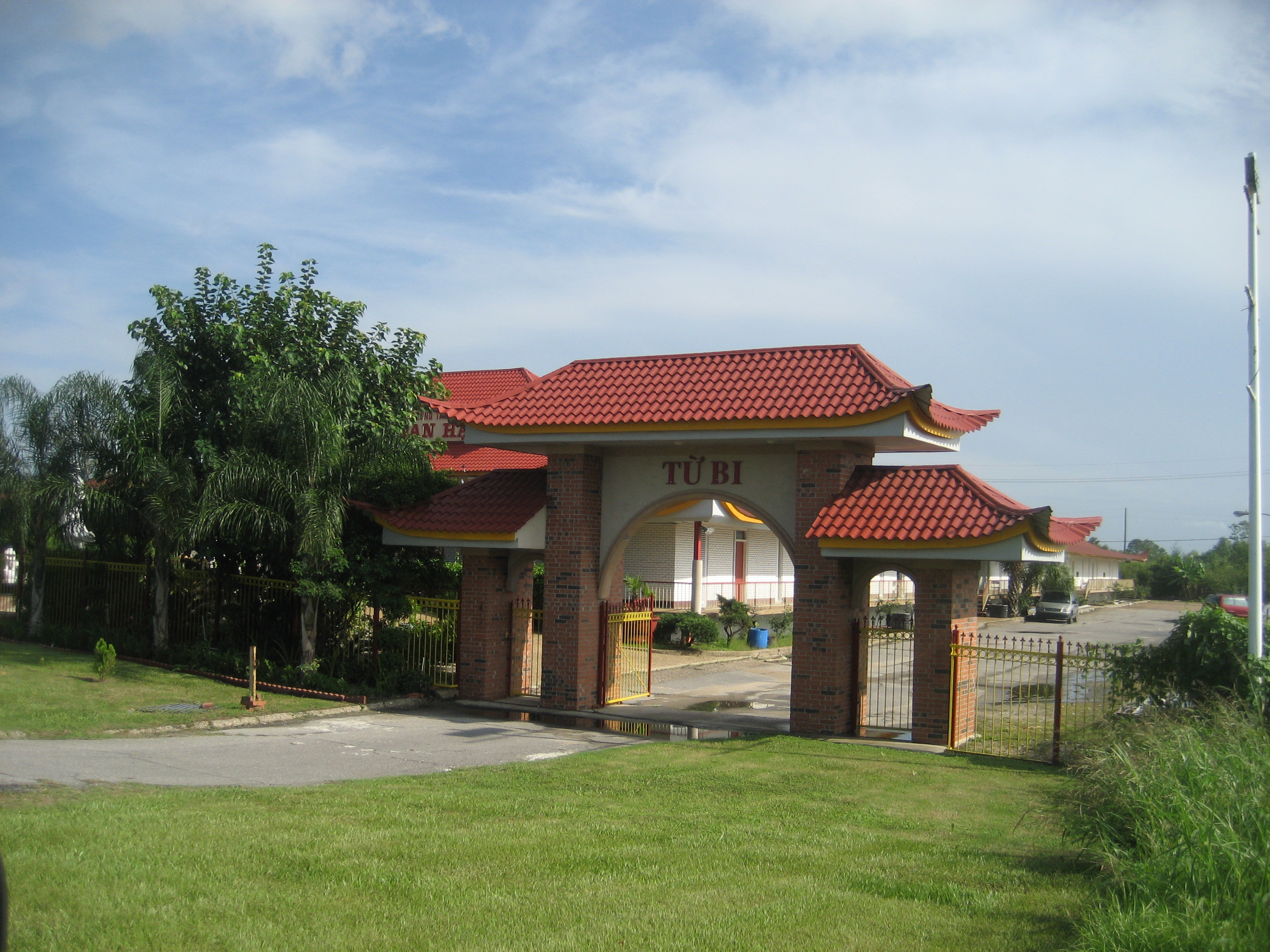
Gate of "Little Vietnam" section of New Orleans

Louisiana is home to many Vietnamese, many of whom especially engaged in traditional fishing. Both Louisiana and Vietnam had been French colonies. New Orleans has several areas with a concentration of Vietnamese-American businesses. The largest among these communities is located around Village de L'Est, which includes significant community and commercial institutions such as Mary Queen of Vietnam Church and Dong Phuong Oriental Bakery.

There is a Vietnamese business section in Baton Rouge, located near the 12000 block of Florida Boulevard (part of U.S. Route 190), which consists of restaurants, grocery stores, and other various businesses, even found throughout some other sections of the city.

In 2008, Anh "Joseph" Cao made history after being elected to Congress as a Republican from Louisiana's heavily Democratic 2nd congressional district, which includes most of New Orleans. Cao served one term, and was the first person of Vietnamese ancestry ever elected to the U.S. Congress.

==== Mississippi ====
A small "Little Saigon" can be found on Oak Street in Biloxi. Many Vietnamese Americans relocated to southern Mississippi due to the similar environment and industry they were accustomed to back in Vietnam. The Vietnamese American labor force in this area is usually spread between the fishing, gambling, and shipbuilding industries.

=== Illinois ===
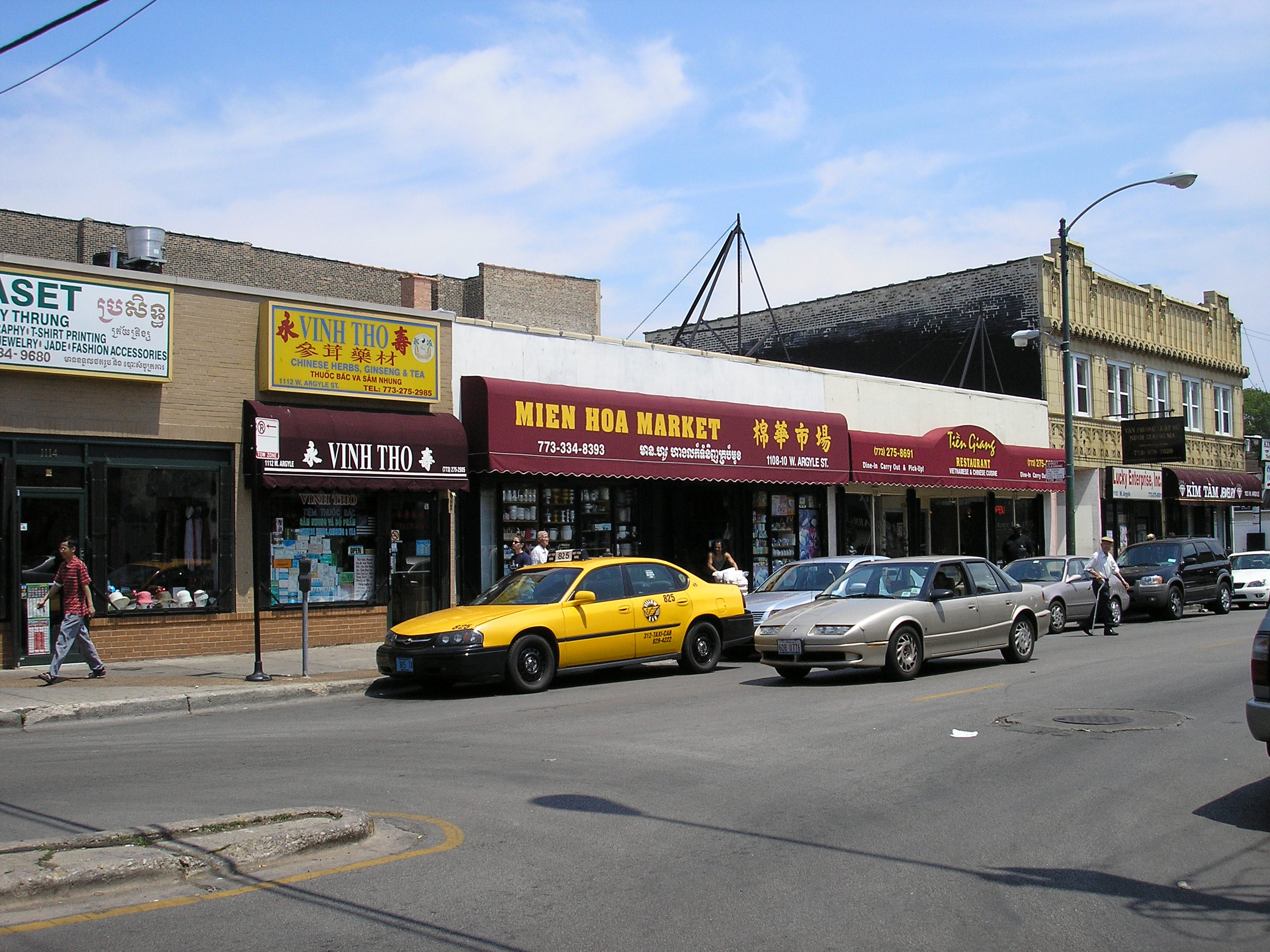
The "New Chinatown" in Chicago

Argyle Street in the city of Chicago contains a Little Saigon district, and it has become the hub of vibrant Vietnamese culture in the city. It is referred to by Chicagoans as the "New Chinatown", little Saigon, or most commonly Argyle. Argyle is easily accessible from the CTA Red Line's Argyle station.

=== Kentucky ===
Louisville has an unofficial Vietnamese district, dubbed "Little Saigon" by TARC drivers back in the 1990s, centered on areas near South 3rd Street and Southside Drive, primarily in the Southside neighborhood. Although Vietnamese-American businesses, institutions and population etc. have spread to other parts of the county, they are still primarily concentrated near Iroquois Park, to its east, in the 40214 zip code.

=== Massachusetts ===
Dorchester, Massachusetts, a neighborhood of Boston, is home to a major Vietnamese business center in the Northeast. It serves some 75,000 Vietnam-born Americans in the Boston-Worcester area as well as those in surroundings states such as Connecticut and Rhode Island. Communities there are served by a number of Viet-organized social service agencies (such as The Southeast Asian Coalition in Worcester Viet-AID, the Vietnamese American Initiative for Development) and some religious and publicly funded organizations. Native Vietnamese who speak fluent Vietnamese, whether or not they live in Boston, are recruited for work here.

The "X" in Springfield is a magnet for Vietnamese businesses and the locus of Vietnamese settlement in western Massachusetts, including restaurants, businesses and a Vietnamese community center.

=== Missouri ===
Kansas City is home to more than 10,000 Vietnamese immigrants. A sizable Vietnamese population along East Truman Road, Independence Avenue & River Market area (Garrison Square) sprung up various businesses including phở restaurants, nail salons, hair salons, video gift stores, cell phone stores, pool halls and jewelry stores. One of the new "Little Saigons" can now be found on North Oak Trafficway in Kansas City Gladstone neighborhood.

St. Louis also has a large Vietnamese immigrant population. The majority of restaurants and stores are in "South City" on or near Grand Avenue.

=== Michigan ===
Taken in front of Dan Thien Duong in Madison Heights during Vietnamese (Tet) New Year in February 2000

While not titled a "Little Saigon", the suburban community of Madison Heights in the Detroit area has become a center of Vietnamese commerce. Located on John R Road and on Dequindre Road, several Vietnamese markets, Phở noodle soup restaurants, movie/music stores, several nail supply stores, herbal stores, and beauty salons have cropped up along two streets.

Besides Madison Heights, the Grand Rapids and Holland areas have a small Vietnamese enclave.

Inkster has a neighborhood known as "Little Saigon," though this is in reference to the Vietnam war and not Vietnamese people or culture. "Little Saigon" is a collection of housing projects along Inkster Road and Annapolis where bullet holes and boarded windows are common.

=== Nebraska ===
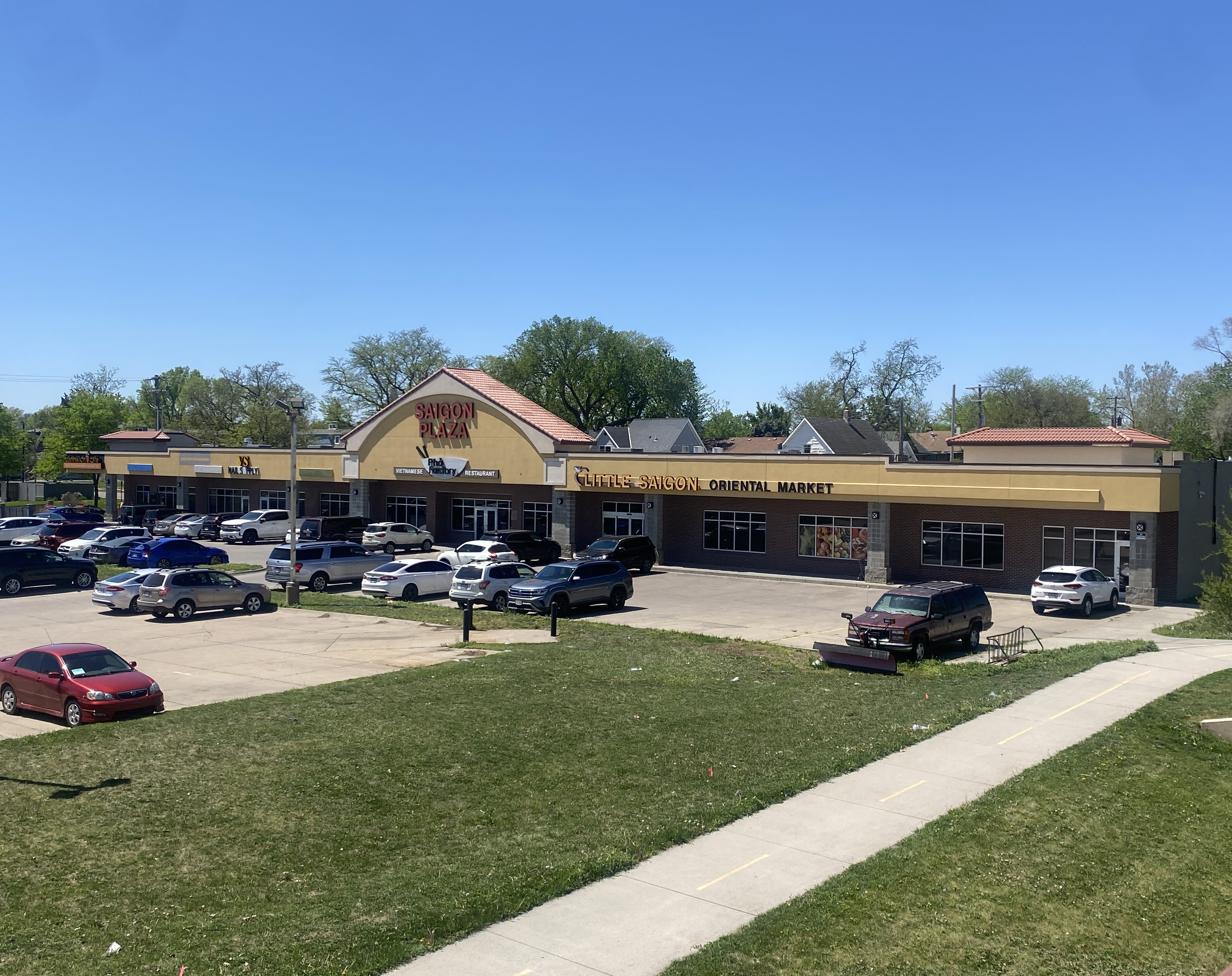
Saigon Plaza in Lincoln, Nebraska

10,832 Vietnamese people live in Nebraska as of 2024, mostly concentrated in Lincoln and Omaha. Lincoln was designated a "refugee-friendly" city by the U.S. Department of State in the 1970s, and has been a federally designated refugee resettlement site since the '80s. There are many businesses along Lincoln's 27th St. Lincoln has a Buddhist Center and Omaha has a Buddhist Temple. Vietnamese is the third-most spoken language in the state, after Spanish and English.

=== New Mexico ===
Albuquerque, New Mexico has a small "Little Saigon" community with various Vietnamese restaurants and businesses on and around Central Avenue in the city's International District.

=== New York ===
New York City's unofficial "Little Saigon" Vietnamese community exists near the intersection of the Bowery and Grand Street. Although small compared with nearby Chinatown, the area is differentiated by the large presence of Vietnamese stores as compared with Chinese stores.

=== North Carolina ===
In Charlotte, Central Avenue (near Briar Creek Road) is the original "Chinatown" consisting of "Saigon Square" and a pair of other Chinese/Vietnamese shopping plazas that include "Dim Sum Restaurant" (which serves New York-style dim sum), the "Eang Hong Supermarket", "Van Loi" (which serves cha shao), and a dozen or so other stores.

Saigon Square has various Vietnamese (albeit not Chinese) stores including Phở Hòa (Vietnamese noodles). Asian Corner Mall, located near North Tryon Street and Sugar Creek Road, opened in 1999 in the former Tryon Mall. It contained several Asian restaurants, markets, and other businesses, including Dragon Court Restaurant, Hong Kong BBQ, International Supermarket, New Century Market, and other Chinese and Vietnamese stores. The mall closed in January 2023 after issues were found with its fire safety systems. The property was later planned for redevelopment as Sugar Yards.

There are also areas in Greensboro where Vietnamese-run businesses (including stores and restaurants) are prevalent.

=== Oklahoma ===
Oklahoma City has a significant Vietnamese American business district and ethnic neighborhood located in the center part of the city. While it is officially known as Asian District by the city, due to the abundant Asian diversity of the neighborhood (similar in many respects to International District in Seattle), much of the original Little Saigon portion centers along Military Drive and NW 23rd Street between North Classen Boulevard and North Shartel Avenue.

Tens of thousands of Vietnamese refugees were relocated to Oklahoma City during the 1980s. Over time, they have established businesses in a gentrified area to the west of the Uptown NW 23rd and Classen Boulevard business districts and the area begun to be known as a Little Saigon.

The original Little Saigon area features numerous phở cafés, Vietnamese bakeries and restaurants, and Asian supermarkets. There are also numerous hopping nightclubs, karaoke, and video bars joining the growing list of Chinese, Thai, Filipino, and Korean residents and establishments that make up the remainder of surrounding Asian District.

The district is very popular with local residents and students from nearby Oklahoma City University, providing a colorful and authentic taste of the Far East in the heartland of America. Oklahoma City's original Little Saigon neighborhood was featured in the New York Times as well as National Geographic's March 2003 issue's ZipUSA series titled "73106: Lemongrass on the Prairie".

=== Oregon ===
10,641 Vietnamese Americans live in the Portland area. Many Vietnamese restaurants, markets, and other businesses in Portland can be found on NE Sandy Boulevard, SE Powell Boulevard, and NE and SE 82nd Avenue. There are also some Vietnamese business around the Portland area such as Beaverton, Hillsboro, Aloha, and Tigard.

=== Pennsylvania ===
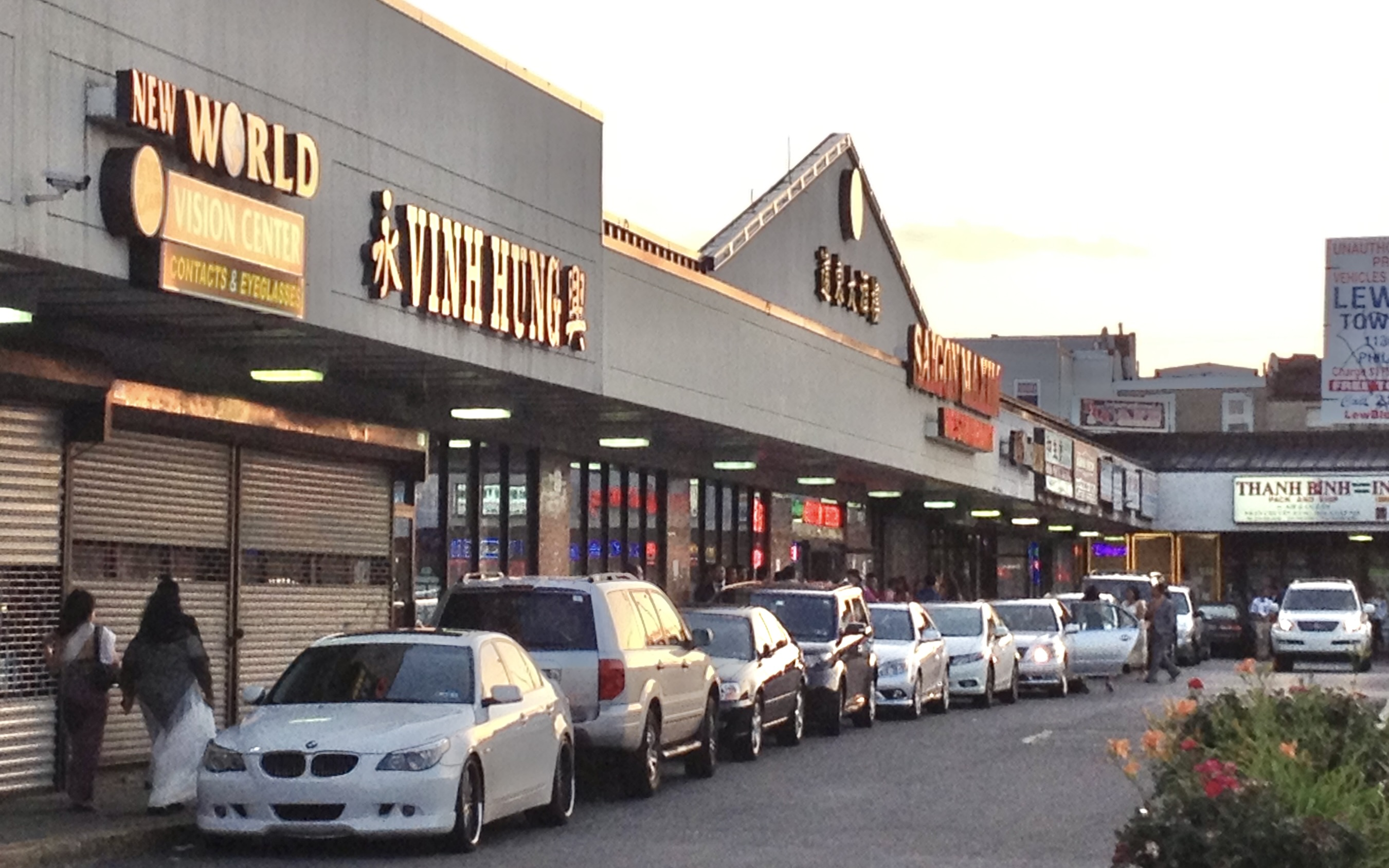
Little Saigon, Philadelphia

South Philadelphia near the Italian Market has a large Vietnamese American population. Many Vietnamese businesses tucked in strip malls have emerged on Washington Avenue to service the local immigrant population. The Vietnamese sandwich bánh mì is gaining much attention in Philadelphia and is now competing with the Philly Cheesesteak.

As of 2005, Vietnamese are projected to become the largest ethnicity in South Philadelphia. Philadelphia is in the top ten U.S. cities for Vietnamese populations and Vietnamese immigration destinations. Philadelphia even has a higher percentage and numerical population of Vietnamese than New York City, one of the few Asian backgrounds that are actually less represented in New York.

=== Tennessee ===
Memphis has a significant Vietnamese community, affectionately known as "Little Hanoi" located along Cleveland Avenue in Midtown. The community includes many Vietnamese restaurants and shops, as well as a Vietnamese Buddhist temple and areas of predominantly Vietnamese housing. Little Hanoi is one of the last and largest non-Hispanic immigrant enclaves in the Memphis metropolitan area.

=== Texas ===
==== Austin ====
Austin has a Chinatown Center composed mainly of Vietnamese business on North Lamar.

==== Houston ====
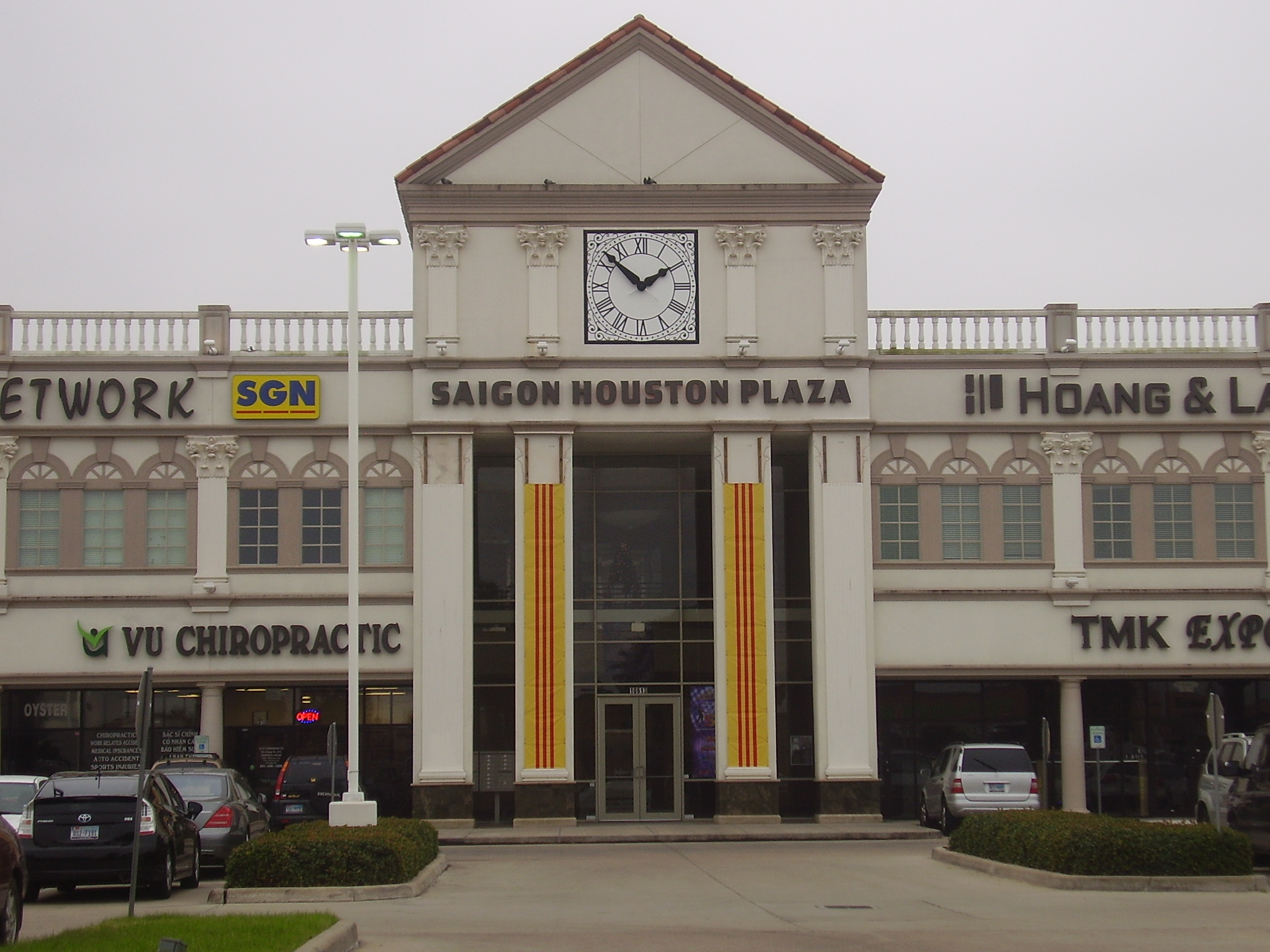
Saigon Plaza in Little Saigon, Houston

The Houston area is home to over 150,000 Vietnamese people. A section of Midtown Houston known as "Little Saigon" was the original commercial district home for the Vietnamese community in Houston. The boundaries are IH 69/US 59, Preston Street, St. Joseph Parkway and Emancipation Avenue. Vietnamese street signs denote the area since 1998. In 2004, this area was officially named "Little Saigon" by the city of Houston. The redevelopment of Midtown Houston from run-down to upscale increased property values and property taxes, forcing many Vietnamese-American businesses out of the neighborhood into other areas.

The largest Vietnamese commercial district is now found in Houston (Alief), a strip along Bellaire Boulevard west of Chinatown, Houston, with most Vietnamese-owned businesses and restaurants centered at the Hong Kong City Mall on Bellaire and Boone (anchored by Hong Kong Food Market and Ocean Palace Restaurant).

Since the Vietnamese District is adjacent to Houston's Chinatown, it is often confused to be part of the same neighborhood. The Vietnamese and the Chinese district are each their own individual neighborhood, however. Even though the area is primarily Vietnamese and Chinese, there is also a large number of Filipino Americans, Arab Muslims, Indonesian Americans, and Pakistani Americans in the area, as well as a sizable number of African Americans, whom were once the majority in the Little Saigon area prior to the Vietnam War.

==== Dallas–Fort Worth (DFW) ====
In addition to the ones listed here, several unofficial Little Saigons are located in the Dallas–Fort Worth metroplex. Dallas is also considered another one of the largest Vietnamese communities in the United States, along with its sister city, Fort Worth.

- One Little Saigon is located in Garland, along Walnut Street between Audelia Road and Jupiter Road. This one is the largest, consisting of four large supermarkets (Hiep Thai, New Truong Nguyen, Hong Kong, and Thuan Phat at Cali Saigon Mall in Garland). Each supermarket listed below is located in a different shopping complex and has a number of restaurants.
  - Hiep Thai: northeast corner of Jupiter and Walnut.
  - New Truong Nguyen: northwest corner of Jupiter and Walnut.
  - Hong Kong: southwest corner of Audelia and Walnut.
  - Thuan Phat Supermarket/Cali Saigon Mall: northeast corner of Jupiter Road and Beltline Road (in Garland borders with city of Richardson)
- The restaurants in the area are Bistro B, La Me, Doan, Pho 95, Pho Bang, SaiGon Kitchen, Nam Hua, Saigon Block, Pho Tay Do, Pho Que Huong, Pho Bac, Pho Pasteur, Huong Ly (in Richardson), and many more.
- Another one is located in Arlington, on Pioneer Parkway. This Little Saigon includes a couple supermarkets (New Market, Hong Kong, Hiep Thai, Central Market, May Hao Market), restaurants, Vietnamese Martyrs Catholic Church, which is the largest Vietnamese Catholic Church in the United States of America, and Vietnamese karaoke/café bars.
- The third one is in Irving on Beltline Road, with Little Saigon Mall. A small concentration of Vietnamese restaurants are being built on MacArthur and Beltline through Las Colinas and Valley Ranch. These restaurants are unique, infusing Korean, Japanese, Thai, Indian, and Chinese influences.
- There are also a number Vietnamese strip malls along Beltline in Carrollton. Though the area is predominantly Vietnamese, Chinese and Korean shops and churches can be found there, as well.
- Haltom City (on E Belknap Street) with many grocery stores, restaurants, and other stores.

Vietnamese businesses are also found in Richardson and Haltom City.

=== Virginia ===
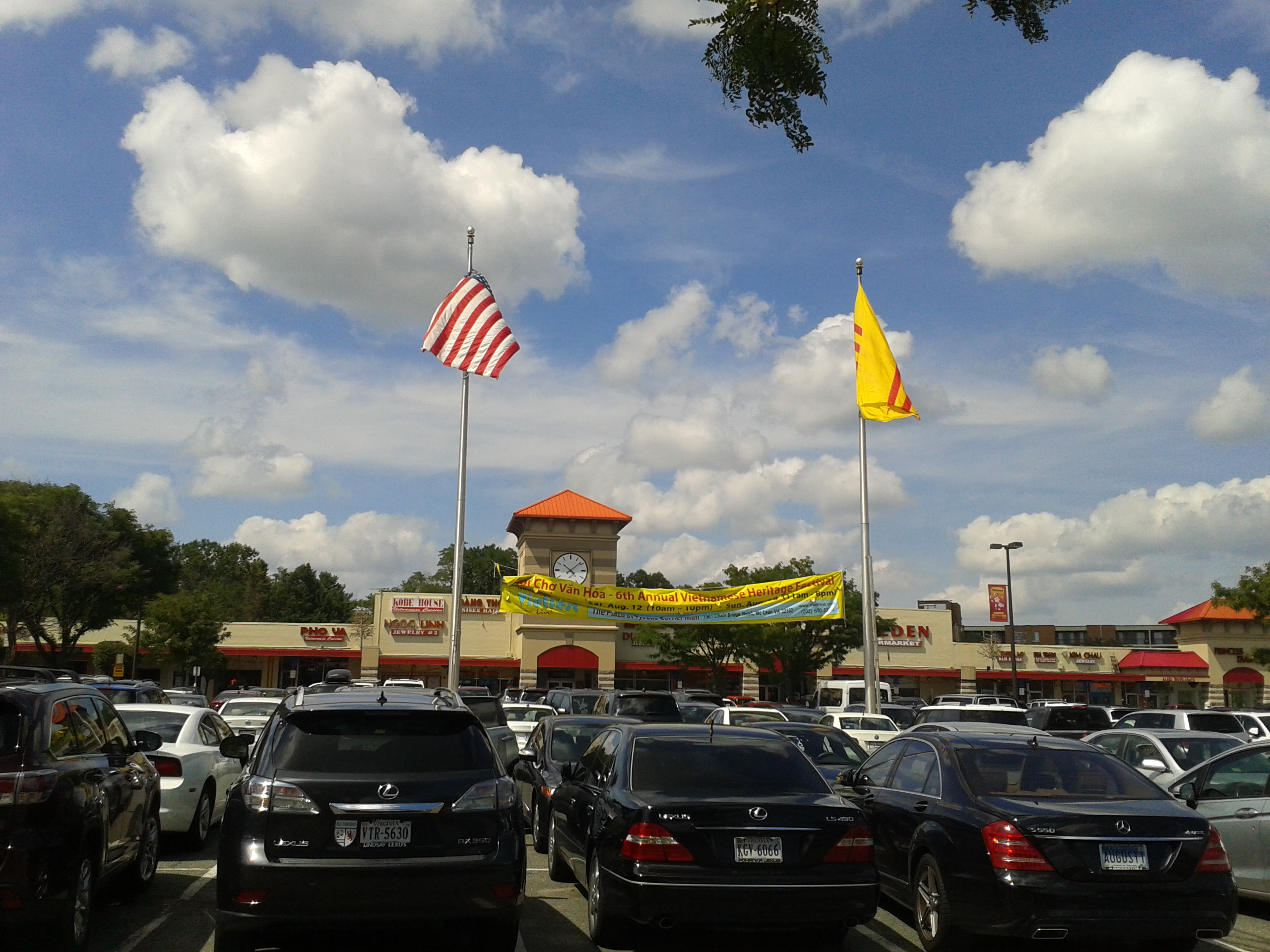
Eden Center

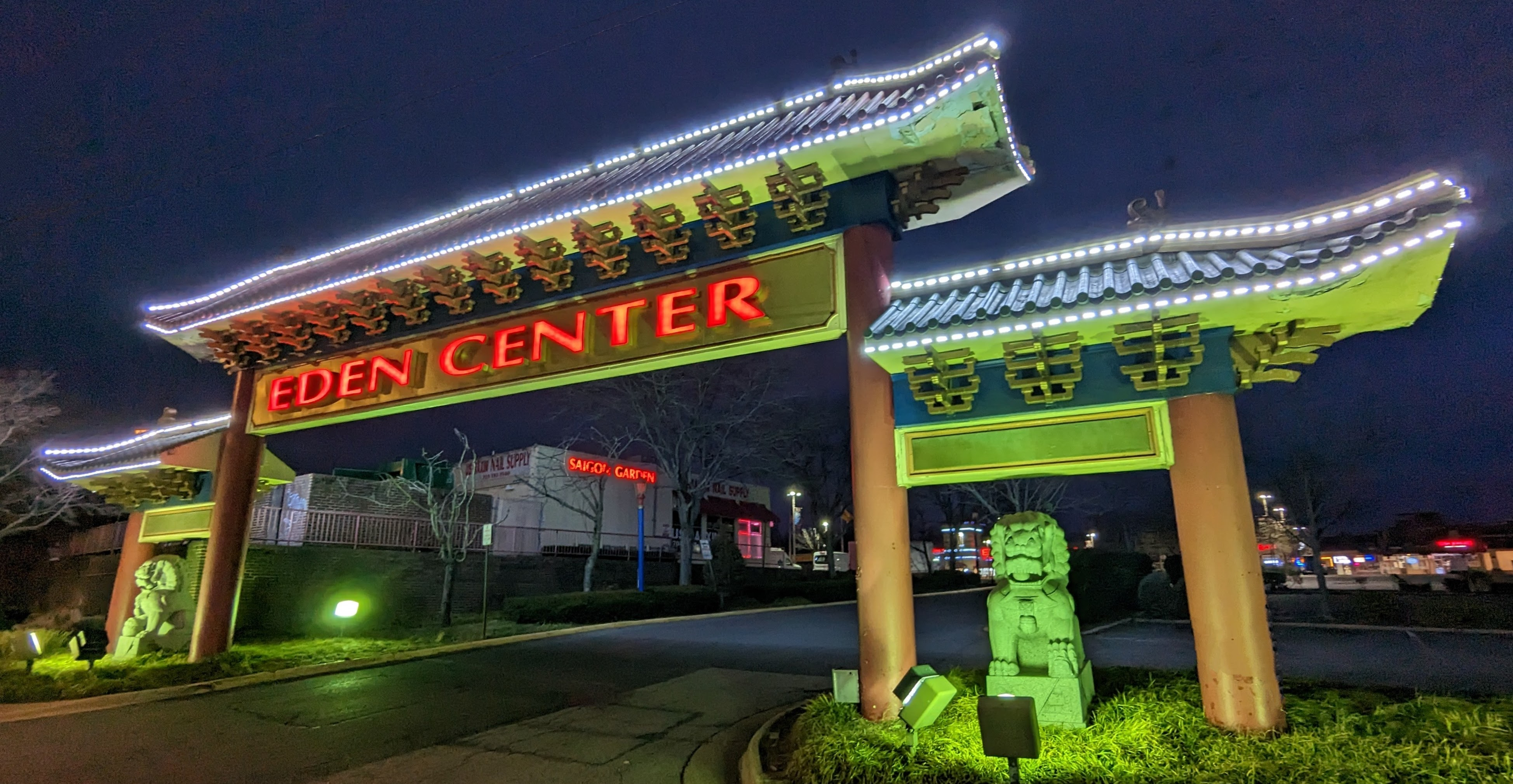
Eden Center at night

Little Saigon, Arlington, in Clarendon, served as the Little Saigon of the Washington, D.C. region, reaching its heyday following the Fall of Saigon during the late 1970s and early 1980s. Many Vietnamese refugees immigrated to the area due to the proximity to the nation's capital, and existing social, family, and business connections. This neighborhood was home to Vietnamese grocery stores, restaurants, department stores, cafes, and entertainment to serve the large Vietnamese population. Business was attractive to Vietnamese immigrants in this neighborhood due to the depressed rents during the time of construction of the WMATA Clarendon metro station. This neighborhood was a destination for Vietnamese immigrants both in the Washington D.C. area, as well as throughout the mid-Atlantic region.

The Washington, D.C., suburb of Seven Corners in Fairfax County, Virginia, is now home to the largest Vietnamese American population and cultural center on the eastern seaboard. While there is no full-fledged "Little Saigon" to speak of, the most prominent hub for local-area Vietnamese is the shopping mall called the Eden Center, complete with a garden and an arch signifying its entrance.

In Greater Richmond, the concentration of Vietnamese restaurants and shops near the intersection of Horsepen Road and West Broad Street is sometimes referred to as Little Saigon. This area of Western Henrico has developed as a center for the Vietnamese population since the late 1980s.

=== Washington ===
==== Seattle ====
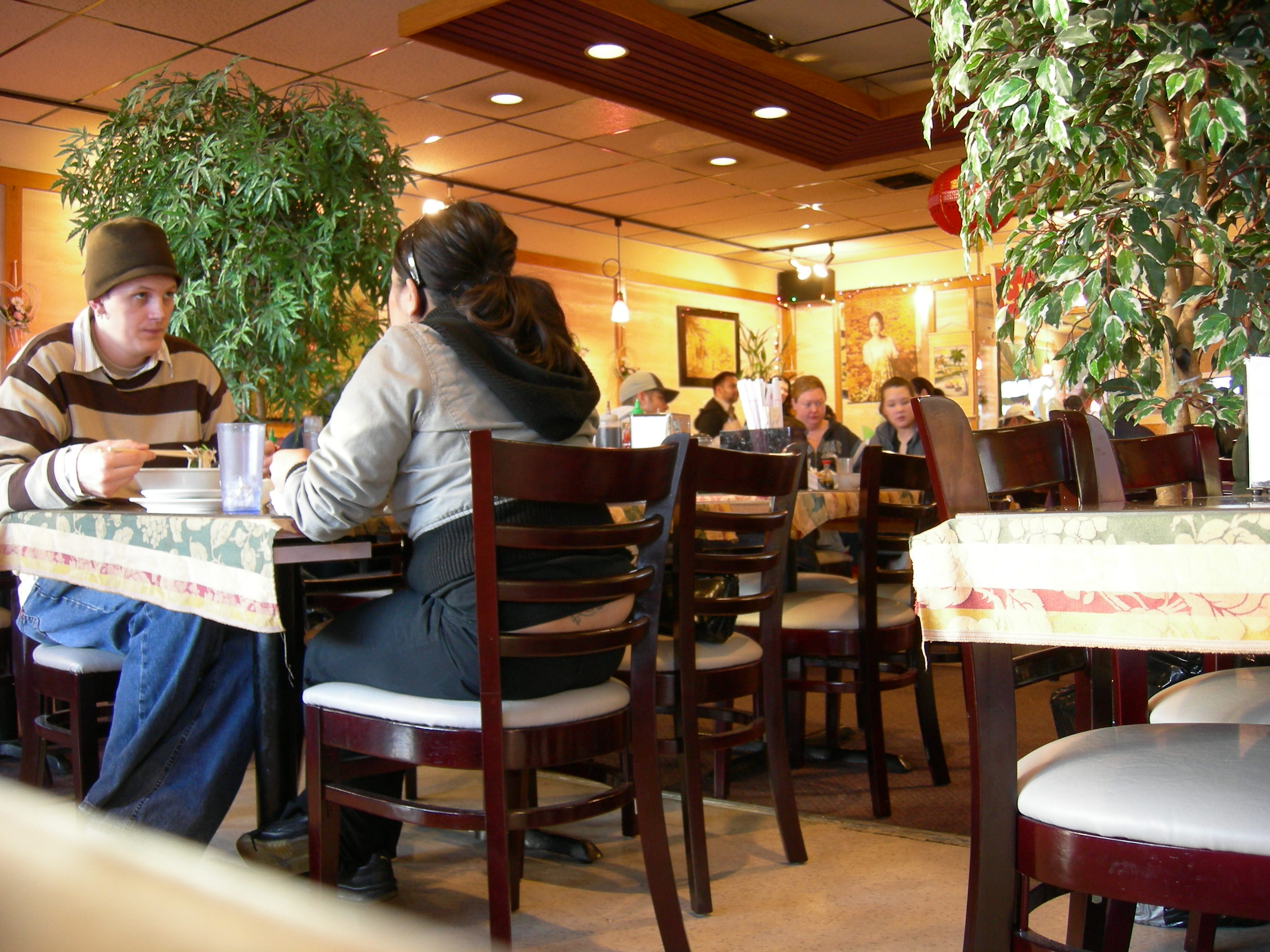
Thanh Vi Vietnamese Restaurant, Little Saigon, Seattle

Seattle has a significant, prosperous Vietnamese American business district centered at 12th Avenue and Jackson Street, immediately east of the city's considerably older Chinatown district. This Vietnamese area has not been officially designated a "Little Saigon", although a few street signs with this name have been erected. Rather, the area – along with the Chinatown district – has retained the longstanding name International District (now officially Chinatown/International District, but often just "The I.D."), dating back to the late 1940s. The predominantly Chinese and predominantly Vietnamese areas are separated from one another by an Interstate 5 viaduct, but there is easy pedestrian and car access between the two.

==== Tacoma ====
Tacoma, as well, has an area commonly known as the "Lincoln International District", which is almost entirely filled with Vietnamese restaurants, grocers, and shops. Though officially not known as "Little Saigon", the area is normally referred to as such by the local resident population.

== Outside the United States ==
Vietnamese diaspora districts outside the United States include, for example, Little Saigon in Vancouver, British Columbia, Canada, Little Saigon in Melbourne, Victoria, Australia, and Little Vietnam between Illawarra and Warren Roads in Marrickville, Sydney, New South Wales, Australia.

== See also ==
- Chinatown – Ethnic enclave of Chinese expatriates
- Japantown – Common name for Japanese enclaves in cities and towns outside of Japan
- Koreatown – Korean-dominated ethnic enclave
- List of U.S. cities with large Vietnamese American populations
- Oh, Saigon
- Vietnamese Americans
- Vietnamese Australians
- Vietnamese Canadians
