= Shun Fat Supermarket =

American Asian supermarket chain

- Native name: 順發超級市場
- Type: Private
- Industry: Retail
- Predecessor: Fred Meyer
- Founded: 1990s; 35 years ago
- Founder: Hieu Tai Tran
- Headquarters: Sacramento, California, United States
- Number of locations: 21
- Areas served: California, Nevada, Oregon, and Texas
- Key people: The Tran's family
- Products: Bakery, dairy, deli, frozen foods, grocery, meat, produce, seafood, snacks, liquor
- Owner: Hieu Tai Tran
- Website: shunfatsupermarket.com

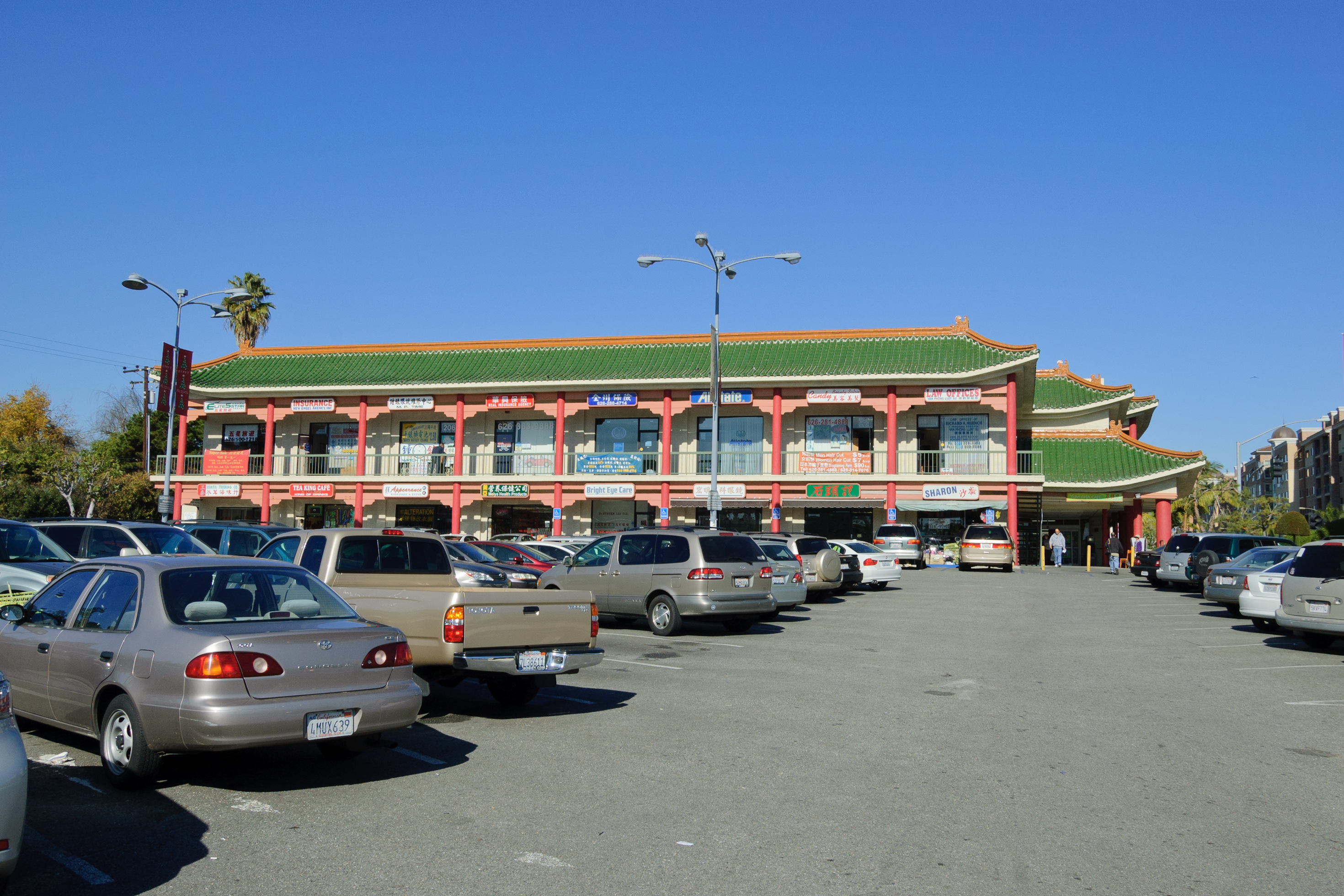
Former Shun Fat Supermarket in Monterey Park

Shun Fat Supermarket (traditional Chinese: 順發超級市場; simplified Chinese: 顺发超级市场; pinyin: Shùnfā Chāojíshìchǎng; Cantonese Yale: seuhn faat chīu kāp síh chèuhng; Vietnamese: Siêu Thị Thuận Phát; also known as SF Supermarket) is a Chinese Vietnamese American supermarket chain in the San Gabriel Valley region in California, Little Saigon, Orange County, California, Sacramento, California, San Pablo, California, Las Vegas, Nevada, Portland, Oregon and Garland, Texas.

Shun Fat Supermarket was started in the mid-1990s by a Chinese Vietnamese entrepreneur named Hieu Tai Tran (陳才孝). Its first store was opened in the Chinese American suburban community of Monterey Park, California. Despite some amusement in the English-speaking press, the name "Shun Fat" actually means "prosperity" in Chinese.

The Asian supermarket chain sells imported grocery items from Asia – particularly mainland China, Hong Kong, Taiwan, Japan, Thailand, and Vietnam – and also a few mainstream American brands as well. Its locations tend to be in newer suburban Chinatowns as well as in developing ethnic Vietnamese American commercial districts.

The market chain competes mainly with the 99 Ranch Market and Hong Kong Supermarket. Like these two supermarket chains, Shun Fat Supermarket usually serves as a major anchor store in some Asian shopping centers and strip malls, which in some cases have been renovated extensively by Hieu Tran. The "Superstores" in Dallas, El Monte, Garden Grove, Las Vegas, San Gabriel and Westminster are uniquely Chinese hypermarkets, as they sell clothing, small electronics and other products in addition to groceries, although these stalls are operated by independent vendors with separate payment.

In 2005, Shun Fat Supermarket opened a 105,000-square-foot (9,800 m^{2}) megastore in the Little Saigon of Westminster, California, joining the already highly competitive Vietnamese supermarket commerce in the community.

In June 2013, the market opened Dallas Superstore, marking its first expansion in Texas.

In 2017, Shun Fat sold the Monterey Park and Rowland Heights locations to Great Wall Supermarket.

In June 2019, the popular Asian supermarket opened its first Oregon branch in Southeast Portland's Jade District on 82nd Avenue and Foster Road, formerly a Fred Meyer store. This marked Shun Fat's fifteenth location and first in the Northwest.

== Locations ==
- California
  - South El Monte – 2650 Rosemead Blvd
  - Garden Grove – 13861 Brookhurst St
  - San Gabriel – 1635 S San Gabriel Blvd
  - San Diego – 6935 Linda Vista Rd
  - Westminster – 15440 Beach Blvd #123
  - Fresno – 4970 E Kings Canyon Rd
  - Sacramento – 4562 Mack Rd
  - Sacramento – 6930 65th St #123
  - Sacramento – 5820 South Land Park Dr
  - Stockton – 8004 West Ln
  - San Pablo – 2368 El Portal Dr
  - Rancho Cordova – 2738 Sunrise Blvd
  - Modesto — 2601 Oakdale Rd
- Nevada
  - Las Vegas – 4801 Spring Mountain Rd
  - Las Vegas – 5115 Spring Mountain Rd
- Oregon
  - Portland – 5323 SE 82nd Ave
- Texas
  - Garland – 3212 N Jupiter Rd
