= Hong Kong Supermarket =

American Asian supermarket chain

Hong Kong Supermarket 香港超級市場
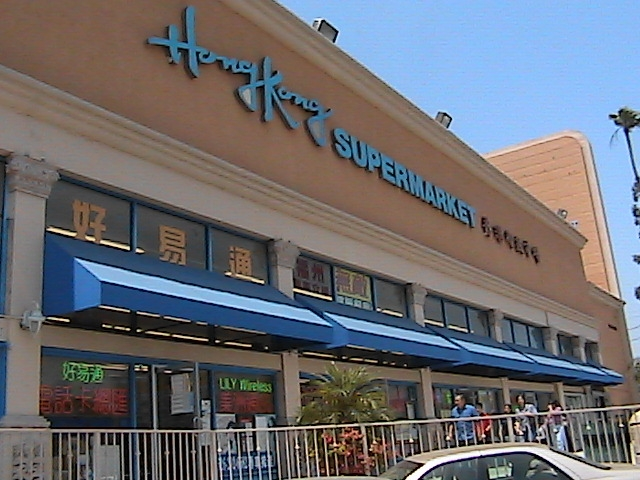
- Type: Private
- Industry: Retail
- Founded: 1981 (Los Angeles, California)
- Founder: Jeffrey Wu
- Headquarters: Los Angeles, California
- Number of locations: 6
- Products: Bakery, dairy, deli, frozen foods, grocery, meat, produce, seafood, snacks, liquor

Hong Kong Supermarket
- Traditional Chinese: 香港超級市場
- Simplified Chinese: 香港超级市场
- Literal meaning: Hong Kong Supermarket
Transcriptions
Standard Mandarin
- Hanyu Pinyin: Xīanggǎng Chāojí Shìcháng

Hong Kong Supermarket is an Asian American supermarket chain started in the San Gabriel Valley region of Southern California. It operates mainly in the newer suburban overseas Chinese communities, particularly in the Los Angeles, Philadelphia, and New York City areas. Hong Kong Supermarket specializes mainly in imported Asian groceries. Many items are from Mainland China, Hong Kong, Macau, Japan, South Korea, Thailand, Taiwan, Vietnam, Indonesia, and the Philippines.

The supermarket caters to a specific customer base. The first store in Monterey Park, California, was a popular destination for Mainland Chinese emigres, and the Hong Kong Supermarkets in New York City focus on mainland Chinese immigrant customers (large community of mainlanders in Brooklyn).

Hong Kong Supermarket was established in 1981 by Jeffrey Wu (胡兆明) with its former flagship store located in Monterey Park, California, where it is still among the popular Asian supermarkets, and is headquartered in New York City. It is currently owned by Jeffrey Wu and his wife, former Hong Kong actress Veronica Yip. In Southern California, its main competitors were 99 Ranch Market and Shun Fat Supermarket. In the New York City area, it competes with Kam Man Food, Good Fortune Supermarket, New York Mart, and Great Wall Supermarket. In Boston, it competes with Kam Man, H Mart, and C-Mart.

In 2009, Hong Kong purchased Super 88, an Asian supermarket chain which had already closed three of its six stores in 2008, citing poor sales. Super 88 had also faced increasing competition and a $200,000 settlement after violating state wage and hour laws.

The chain sold much of its stores to the Good Fortune Supermarket chain.

== Locations ==
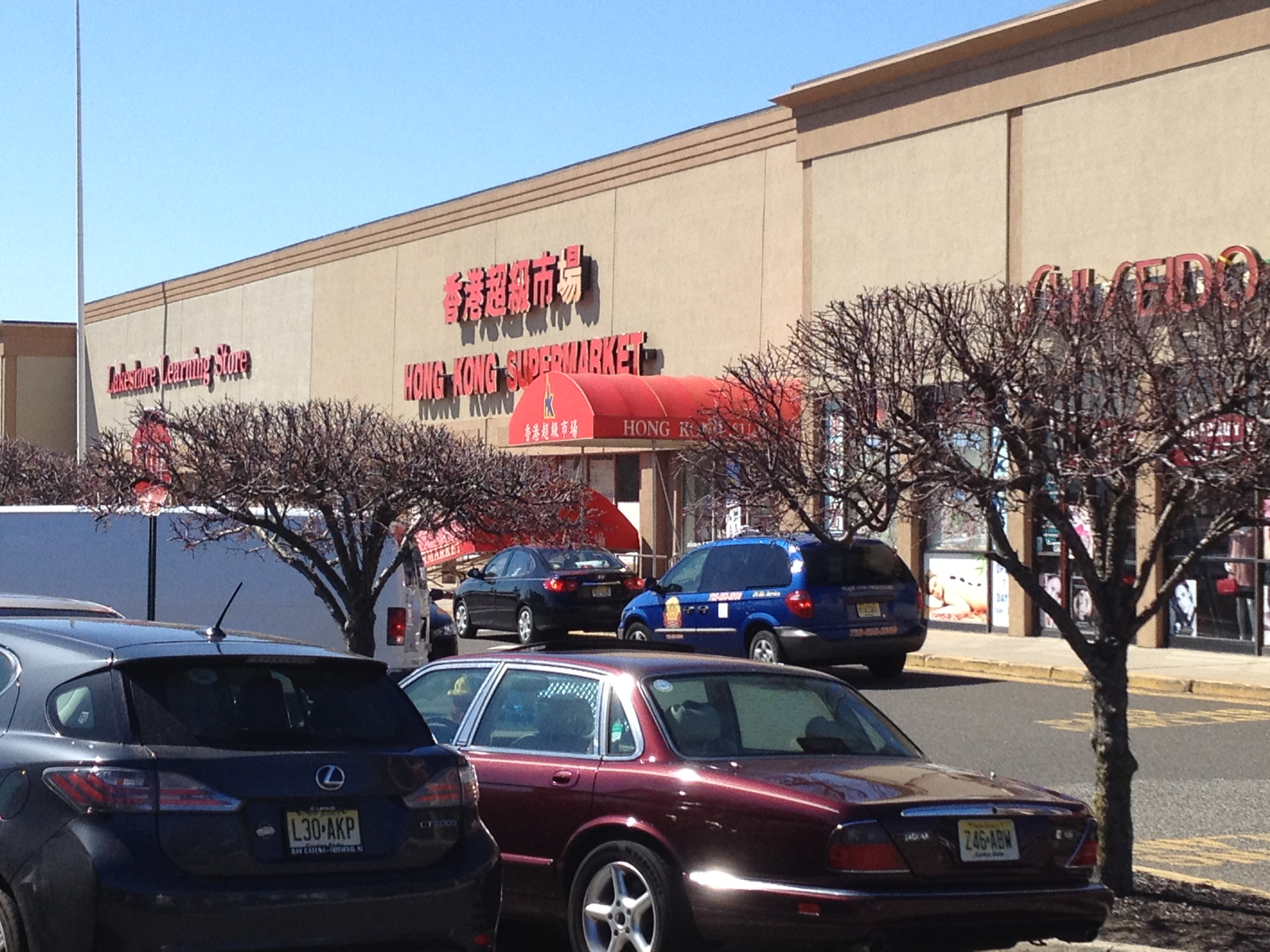
Hong Kong Supermarket in East Brunswick, NJ (near the New York suburbs of Edison, and South River, NJ), Now an Asian Food Market of South River, NJ

- Georgia
  - Norcross - 5495 Jimmy Carter Blvd
- Massachusetts
  - Boston - 1095 Commonwealth Avenue
  - Malden - 188 Commercial St
- New York
  - Chinatown, Manhattan - 157 Hester Street

=== Defunct locations ===
- California
  - Monterey Park - 127 N Garfield Ave (became a Good Fortune Supermarket)
  - Rowland Heights (now HK2 Food District)
  - San Gabriel (now a Good Fortune Supermarket)
  - West Covina (now HK2 Food District)
  - West Covina (now Shun Fat Supermarket)
  - Monrovia (now a Good Fortune Supermarket)
- Massachusetts
  - Allston, Massachusetts
  - Dorchester, Massachusetts
- New Jersey
  - South Plainfield (closed in 2002)
  - East Brunswick (Now an Asian Food Market of South River)
- New York
  - Chinatown, Manhattan (East Broadway Location)(destroyed by fire on May 14, 2009) (now a Chinatown Supermarket Of Manhattan and a Fairfield Inn Hotel above)
  - Sunset Park (now an iFresh Market)
  - Elmhurst (now a US Supermarket)
  - Flushing (now a 99 Ranch Market)
- Pennsylvania
  - Philadelphia (now an American-Asian Supermarket)
- Louisiana
  - Gretna (now a Hong Kong Food Market)
