= Lion Plaza =

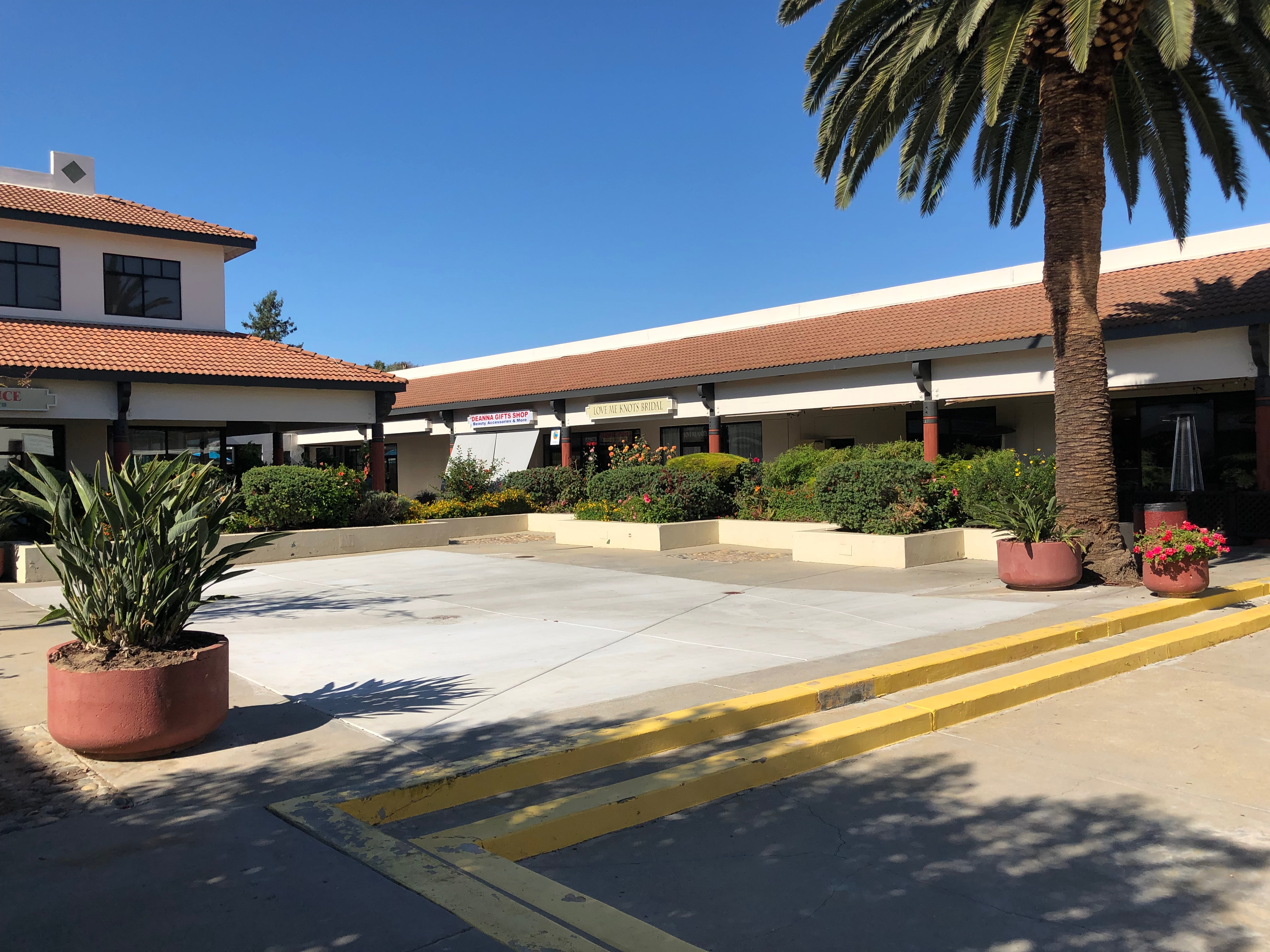
- The courtyard of Lion Plaza
- Location: East San Jose, San Jose, California
- Coordinates: 37°19′19″N 121°49′24″W
- Address: 1710–1834 Tully Road, San Jose, California 95122
- Opened: April 1988
- Developer: Jerry Chen
- Architect: Yui Hay Lee
- Num. of stores: 60
- Num. of anchor tenants: 1
- Floor area: 105,000 square feet (9,800 m^{2})
- Floors: 2

Lion Plaza (Chinese: 獅子城) is an outdoor shopping center in San Jose, California, United States. Located at the corner of King and Tully roads in East San Jose, the center was one of the first to serve the city's ethnic Vietnamese-American and Chinese-American communities. It is named for its anchor tenant, Lion Market. Compared to nearby Grand Century Mall, Lion Plaza serves a more heavily Hoa (ethnic Chinese) neighborhood. It has been likened to a suburban "Chinatown" for San Jose.

== Architecture ==
The center consists of several strip mall–like buildings arranged around a courtyard with ample seating all around. Behind the courtyard is an enclosed food court named after Sun Yat-sen. Reflecting the South Bay's diverse population, architect Yui Hay Lee of Oakland gave the complex a mix of Asian and Hispanic influences, combining the open archways of Mission Revival architecture with Chinese guardian lions and a Chinese dynastic pink and turquoise color scheme.

== History ==
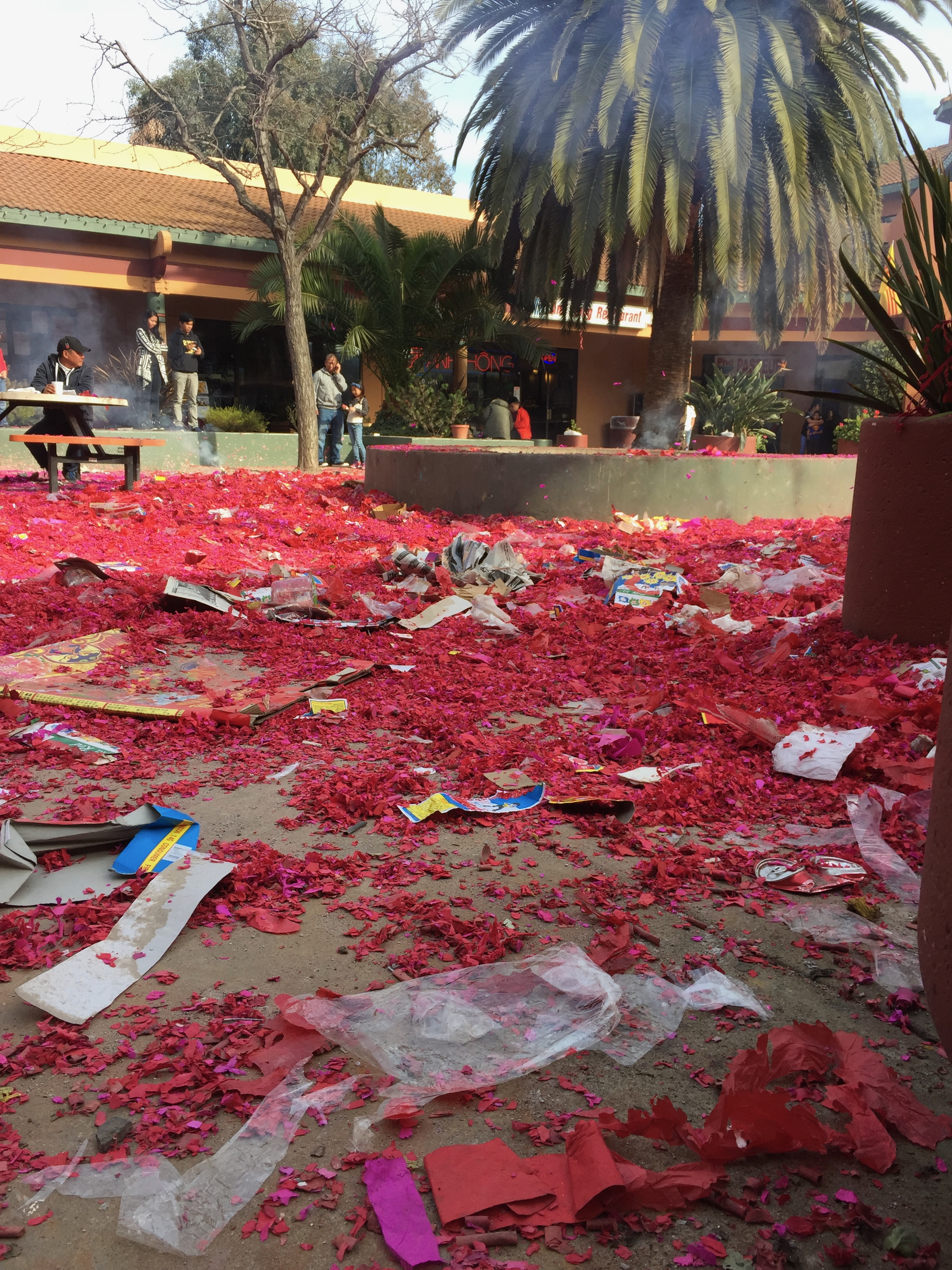
Local residents celebrate Tết by lighting firecrackers on the plaza.

The center was developed by Jerry Chen, a San Jose real estate agent, at a time when the South Bay's Southeast Asian population was growing rapidly. In 1982, he converted a former 27,000-square-foot (2,500 m^{2}) Safeway supermarket into Lion Market. At the time, it was the largest Asian supermarket in Northern California and the first full-service Asian supermarket in the area. Chen had wanted to attract a major Asian supermarket chain to his property, but 99 Ranch Market was not yet interested in expanding to Northern California.

Construction on the surrounding Lion Plaza shopping center began the same year, just as Grand Century Mall opened nearby in what would later become Little Saigon. The first stores at the newly built Lion Plaza began opening in 1984 or 1985. Among them was the first location of Phở Hòa, which would later become an international restaurant chain. At the time of its grand opening in April 1988, the center was home to 60 shops, medical offices, a bank, a World Journal news bureau, and a Taiwanese nightclub.

More Asian shopping centers followed, accelerating the move away from downtown ethnic enclaves. In the late 1980s or early 1990s, a smaller strip mall, King Plaza, opened across King Road, over the objections of the Lion Plaza Business Association. Despite the increased competition, in 1999, Chen estimated that Lion Plaza saw about 5,000 shoppers per day on weekends and half that number on weekdays. As Asian Americans began purchasing many of the homes in this formerly Latino neighborhood, Chen built an adjacent 272-unit gated apartment complex, Lion Villas, which became popular with older Asians. Over time, Lion Plaza's many Chinese American shops turned over to Vietnamese shopkeepers, as the Vietnamese population in the area continued to grow.

== Tenants ==
Lion Plaza is anchored by Lion Market. There are dozens of smaller shops, restaurants, and offices. TNT Radio, a Vietnamese-language broadcaster, maintains its studios in the complex.
