= Southside, Louisville =

Neighborhood of Louisville, Kentucky, United States

Coordinates: 38°09′52″N 85°45′53″W

Southside is a neighborhood in Louisville, Kentucky, United States. Its boundaries are Third Street to the west, Woodlawn Avenue, Allmond Avenue and Hiawatha Avenue to the north, the CSX railroad tracks to the east, and the southern boundary of the Greater Louisville Technology Park (formerly Naval Ordnance), Southside Drive and Kenwood Drive to the south.

The neighborhood has been settled by a wide array of immigrant groups, mostly refugees. Those from Vietnam dominated throughout most of the 1990s, but have since been succeeded by those from Cuba.

37.6% were born in other countries to parents also born in other countries (first among all neighborhoods in the pre-merger city,) making up 1,976 of the total population of 5,260. The top lands of national origin according to the online Statistical Atlas amongst the foreign-born:

Cuba - 19.1% 377

Burma - 12.7% 251

Vietnam - 8.6% 169

Mexico - 7.0% 139

Iraq - 5.3% 104

Nepal - 4.5% 90

Bosnia and Herzegovina - 3.5% 70

Haiti - 3.2% 63

Iran - 2.0% 40

Ethiopia - 2.0% 39
