= Phở Hòa =

Phở restaurant chain

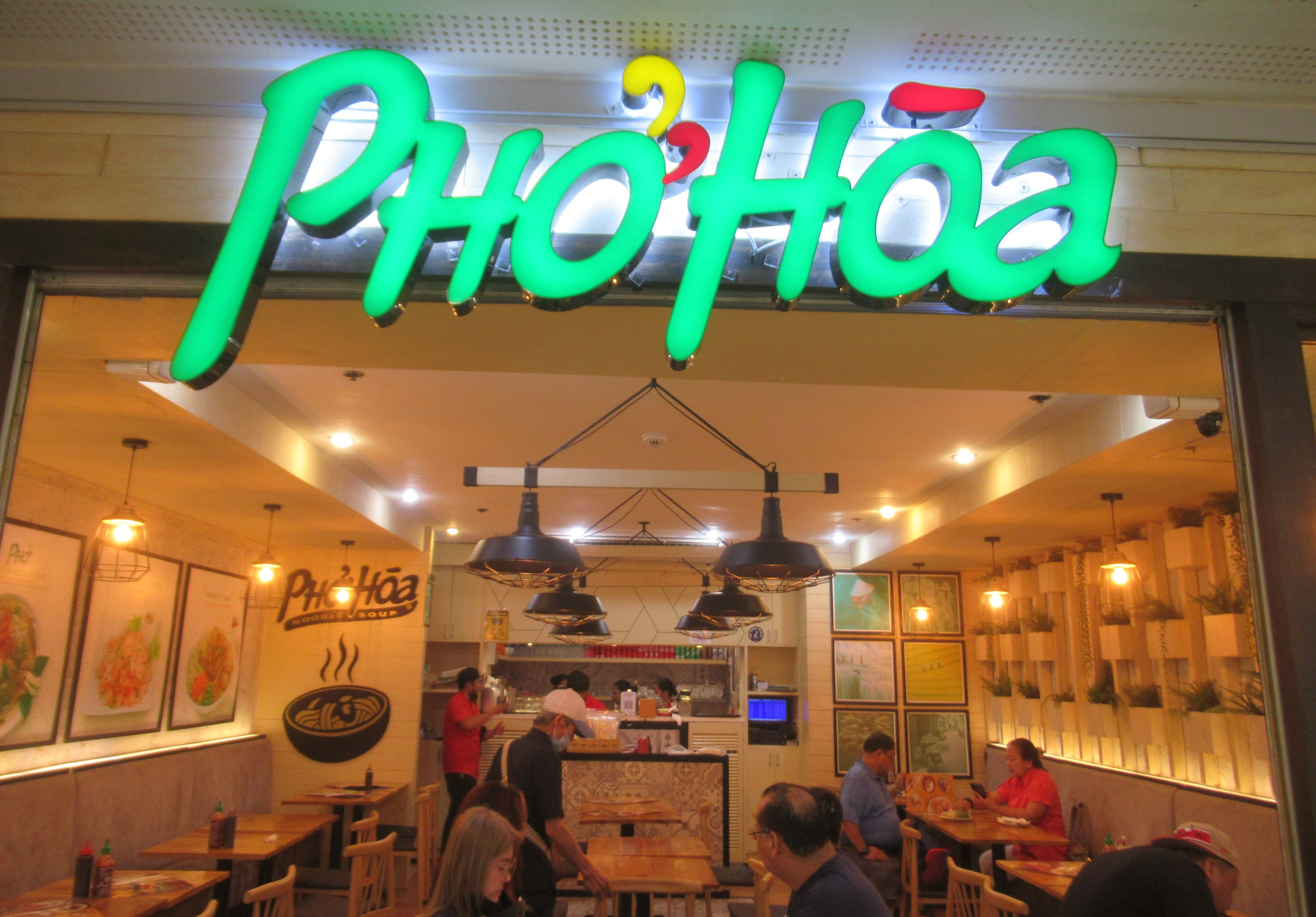
- A Phở Hòa outlet at SM North EDSA, Quezon City, Philippines
- Type: Private
- Industry: Fast food
- Founded: 1983; 43 years ago
- Founder: Binh Nguyen
- Headquarters: Sacramento, California
- Number of locations: 72 (2018)
- Area served: North America; Asia
- Key people: Quốc Phan (President)
- Products: Phở
- Revenue: $50 million (2008)
- Website: www.phohoa.com

Phở Hòa is a phở restaurant chain based in Sacramento, California, United States. It was founded in San Jose, California, in 1983. As of 2017, it has more than 70 locations across the United States, Canada, Indonesia, Malaysia, the Philippines, South Korea, and Taiwan.

== History ==
In 1984, Binh Nguyen and Phan Jiang opened their first Phở Hòa location in Lion Plaza, the first Asian shopping center in San Jose, California, based on a Phở Hòa restaurant that opened in Santa Ana the previous year. In 1986, they began manufacturing a proprietary spice blend for their phở. In the late 1980s, they opened their first restaurant in Canada. In the 1990s, they founded Aureflam Corporation to franchise phở restaurants under the Phở Hòa and Phở Công Lý names. Phở Hòa opened its first location in Asia in 1995.

Phở Hòa claims to be the first Vietnamese restaurant chain to franchise. According to company statistics, Asians accounted for almost 90% of their customers until around 1993, but by 1998 about 50% of customers at recently opened locations were non-Asian.

== See also ==
- List of restaurant chains in the United States
- List of noodle restaurants
- List of casual dining restaurant chains
- List of Vietnamese restaurants
- Lee's Sandwiches, another Vietnamese restaurant chain that began in San Jose in 1983
