= Lincoln International District, Tacoma, Washington =

Neighborhood in the United States

Coordinates: 47°13′30.7″N 122°26′26.7″W

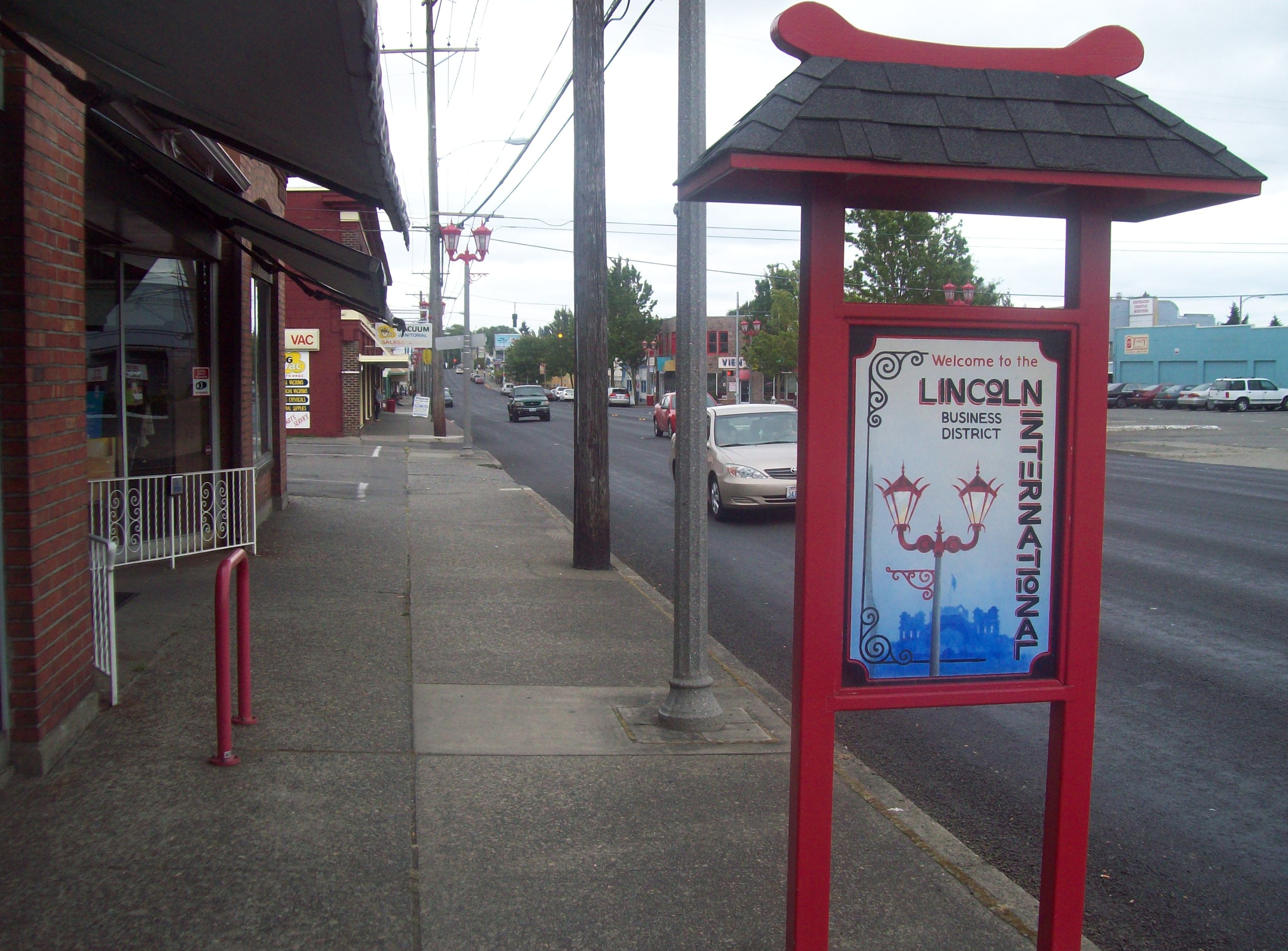
38th Street

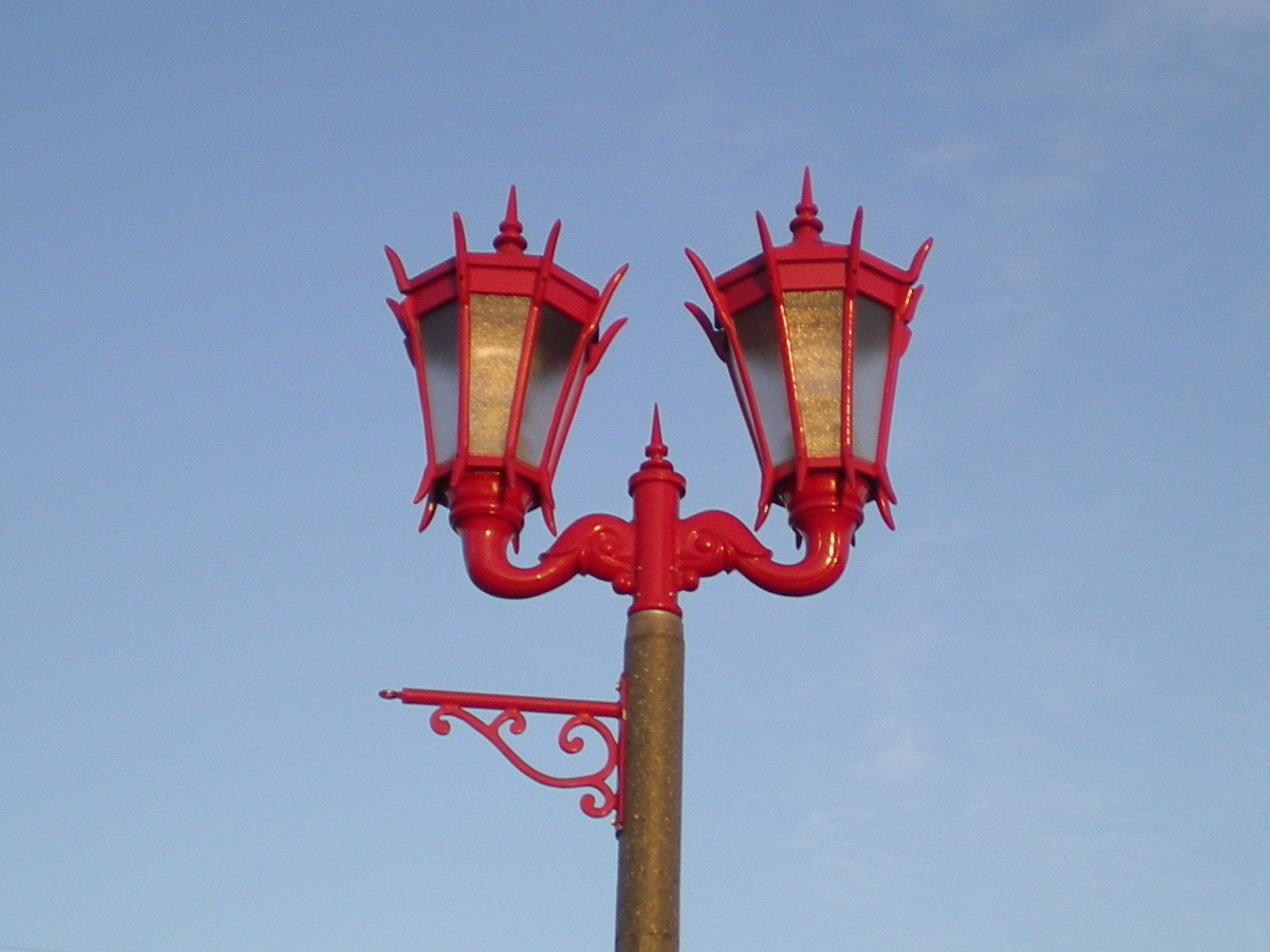
Lampposts on 38th Street.

The Lincoln International Business District is a neighborhood in Tacoma, Washington, near historic Lincoln High School. Centered on S. 38th St and Yakima, the Lincoln International District is home to the majority of Tacoma's Vietnamese businesses and community centers. According to the City of Tacoma, the district has 755 businesses employing more than 8,200 workers (2008 figures). This district is home to Vietnamese celebrations throughout the year, most notably Tết, the Vietnamese New Year.
