= Great Wall Supermarket =

Asian American supermarket chain

GW Supermarket 大中华超级市场

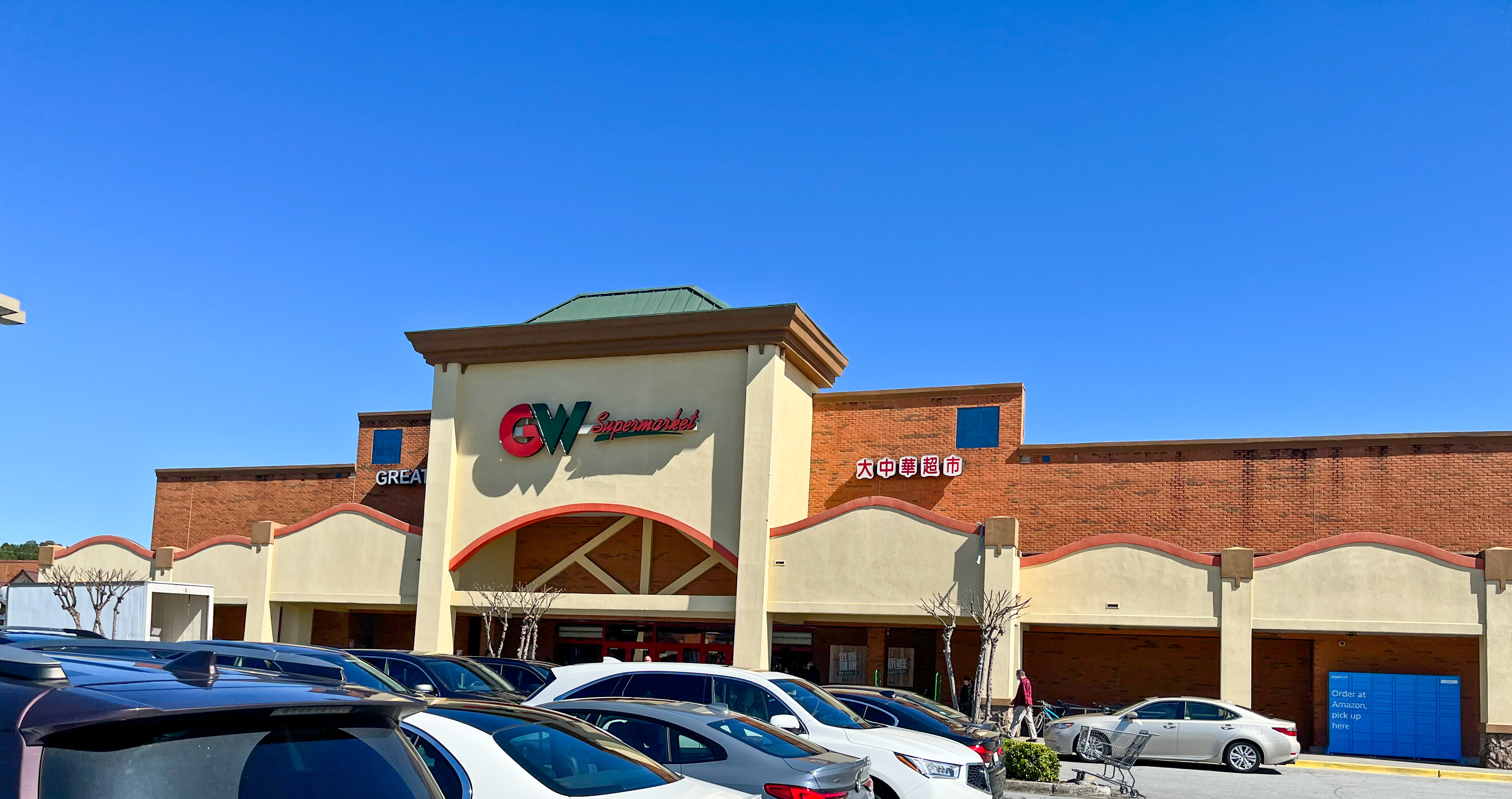
- Type: Private
- Industry: Retail
- Founded: 2004 (New York, New York)
- Founder: Lihui Zhang; Founder and CEO
- Headquarters: New York, New York
- Number of locations: 22 (2023)
- Products: Bakery, dairy, deli, frozen foods, grocery, meat, produce, seafood, snacks, liquor
- Website: www.gw-supermarket.com

Great Wall Supermarket
- Traditional Chinese: 大中華超級市場
- Simplified Chinese: 大中华超级市场
- Literal meaning: Great Chinese Supermarket
Transcriptions
Standard Mandarin
- Hanyu Pinyin: Dà Zhōnghuá Chāojí Shìchǎng

GW Supermarket is a specialized Asian American supermarket chain in the U.S., established in New York City in 2004. The chain caters to Asian immigrants, offering Asian products in a Western supermarket-style retail operation. The President, CEO and founder is Lihui Zhang. There are 22 locations in 7 states as of 2023, including 3 as C Mart 中国超市 in Massachusetts.

== Controversy ==
In 2011, Virginia Department of Game and Inland Fisheries staff conducted a sting of the Great Wall Supermarket in Falls Church, VA and found the store in violation of several local wildlife laws, due to the sale of live animals, including frogs, turtles, eels, largemouth bass, and crayfish. The sting resulted from a complaint from a conservationist. Two managers of the store were charged with felonies in 2012, later reduced to misdemeanors. Great Wall lawyers argued that the wildlife charges did not apply because all of the creatures on sale were commercially farmed: turtles from Oklahoma, eels from Pennsylvania, bullfrogs from the Dominican Republic, and so forth. The defense claimed that "law governing sales of live fish and other animals has not been updated to reflect advances in aquaculture, and that it is tilted against immigrants with unfamiliar cuisines and customs."

Starting in 2012, residents behind the Rockville store began submitting noise complaints to the Montgomery County Department of Environmental Protection. As of June 1, 2015, Great Wall Supermarket has two active ongoing cases and has paid multiple fines as punishment for disturbing the peace and quiet of the adjoining neighborhood.

== In popular culture ==
- A Great Wall store appears as a location in the TV series, Constantine ("A Feast of Friends," Season 1, Episode 4).
