= Nguoi Viet Daily News =

Vietnamese-language newspaper published in California

Người Việt

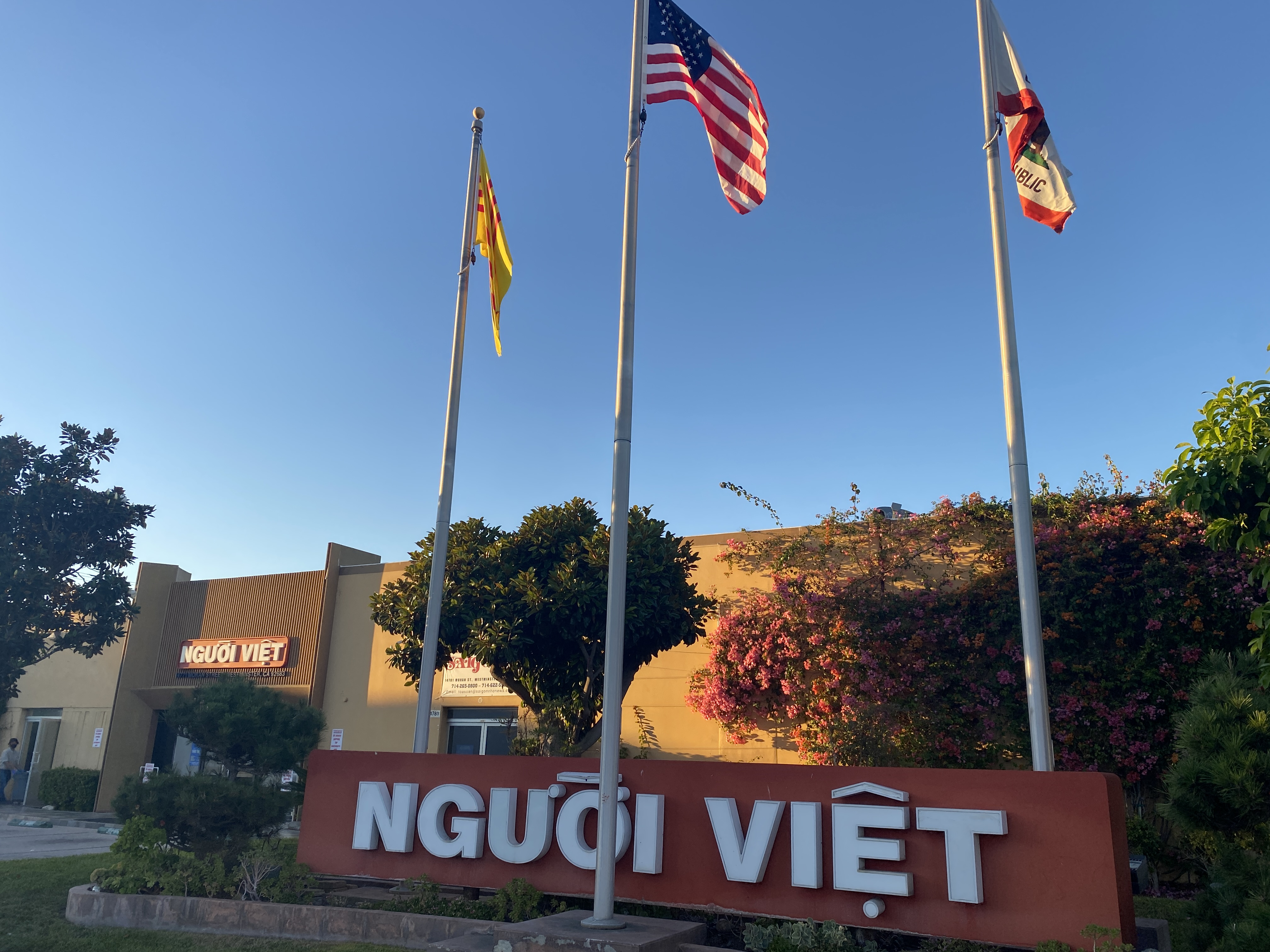
- Người Việt Daily News Headquarters
- Native name: Nhật báo Người Việt
- Type: Daily newspaper
- Owner(s): Nguoi Viet Daily News, Inc. (NV News)
- Founder: Yen Ngoc Do
- Publisher: Nguoi Viet Daily News, Inc. (NV News)
- President: Vicky Hoàng Vĩnh
- Editor-in-chief: Đỗ Dzũng
- Staff writers: 50 (2018)
- Founded: December 15, 1978; 47 years ago
- Language: Vietnamese; English
- Headquarters: 14771 Moran St; Westminster, California 92683, U.S.
- Country: United States
- Circulation: approx. 10,000 (as of 2019)
- Sister newspapers: The Little Saigon News (2016–present)
- Website: www.nguoi-viet.com

Nguoi Viet Daily News (Vietnamese: Nhật báo Người Việt, lit. 'Vietnamese People's Daily') is a Vietnamese newspaper based in Westminster, California aimed towards residents of Little Saigon. It is the first and largest Vietnamese-language newspaper in the United States. As of 2019, Nguoi Viet Daily News had approximately 10,000 total print subscribers.

== History ==
=== Founding ===
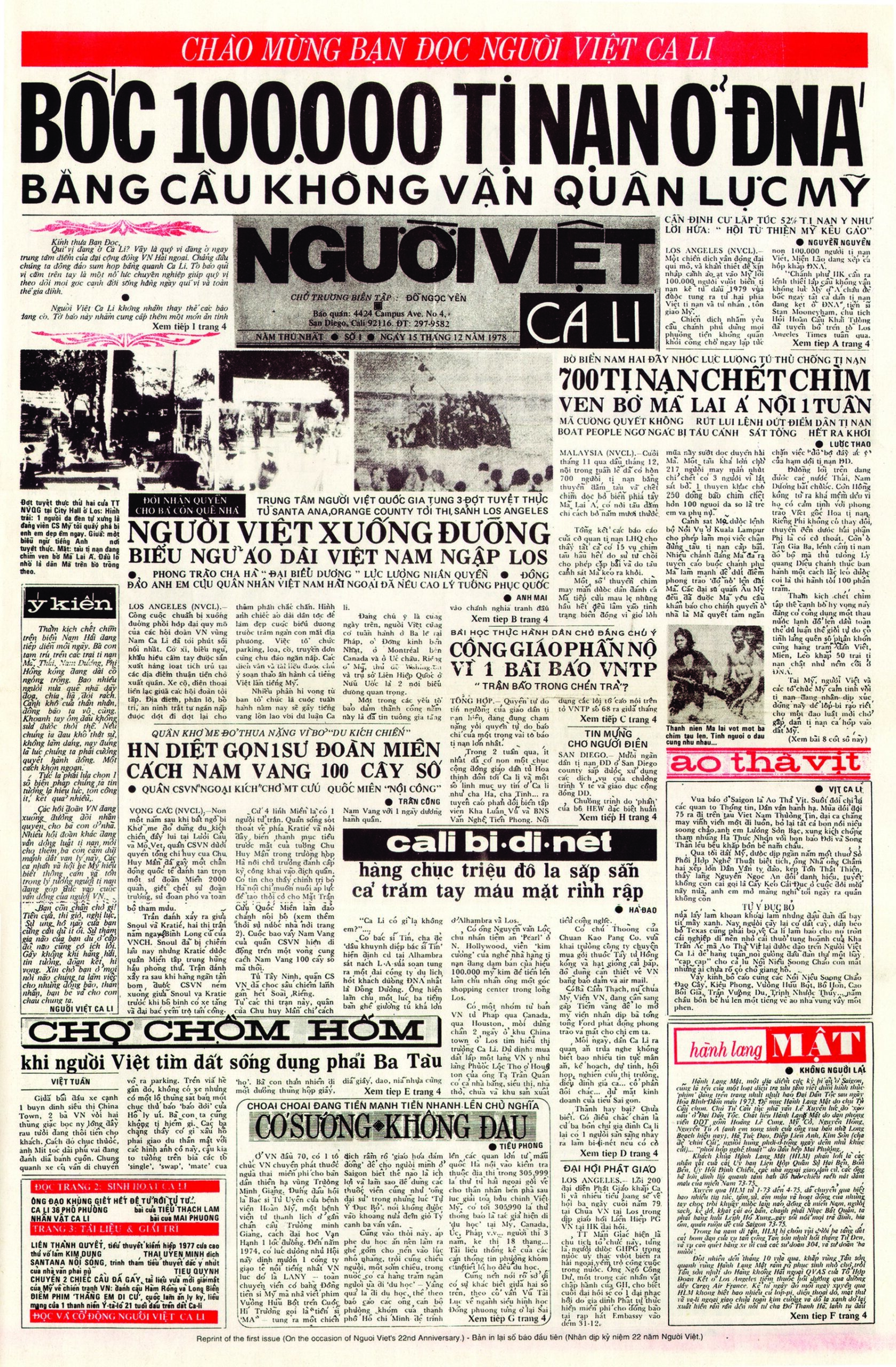
First issue of Nguoi Viet Daily News, December 15, 1978

On December 15, 1978, journalist Yen Ngoc Do launched Nguoi Viet Daily News, the first Vietnamese-language newspaper in the United States. He had immigrated to the United States three years prior and believed there was demand for a Vietnamese newspaper in the U.S. due to the influx of Vietnamese immigrants from the fall of Saigon. Alongside his wife and children, Do started the paper in his garage with $4000 in savings. In its first issue, to inspire nostalgia, the newspaper's first issue was designed similar to Vietnamese newspapers with a red banner overlaid on the top of front page. Initially, Do served as founding editor, publisher and circulation manager and distributed 2,000 copies of the paper door-to-door.

The publication originally was a weekly newspaper in the early 1980s, before transitioning to publishing semiweekly, three days a week, and eventually five days a week.

Initially, the paper was focused on resettling the newly arrived Vietnamese immigrants, such as reporting the price of a kilogram of rice to inform calculations of remittances or instructions on applying for a savings account, mortgage, or apartment. Due to the sensitivity of reporting on the communist Vietnamese government due to anti-communism, Do received death threats for perceived communist sympathies and had protestors storm his office; a newspaper-owned truck was firebombed in the 1980s.

Originally, since there was no Vietnamese-capable software, Nguoi Viet staffers had to print stories without diacritical marks and manually fill in marks by hand. In 1986, the paper adopted the Diplomat input method editor developed by Newport Beach–based VNLabs, allowing it to publish correctly typeset Vietnamese text.

=== Later developments ===
In 2008, the newspaper aroused controversy by publishing an image of an art piece from a UC Davis graduate student during Tết. The photograph of a foot-spa tub resembling the flag of South Vietnam was intended to be a personal tribute to the role of Vietnamese refugees in the nail salon industry but had been interpreted by anti-communist activists as a mounument to the current government of Vietnam. Organizers protested the newspaper for eight days, leading to the publication to apologize for its publication of the photo and to fire its editor-in-chief and managing editor. Nguoi Viet would file a lawsuit against trespassing protestors, which a jury ruled in their favor. The publication also rehired one of the fired editors, Hao-Nhien Vu.

In July 2012, rival Westminster newspaper The Little Saigon News had attacked Nguoi Viet Daily News by claiming it was a communist front. Nguoi Viet Daily News sued the paper, accusing it of defamation by red-baiting. Orange County Superior Court jurors sided with the plaintiff Nguoi Viet and awarded it a $4.5-million verdict. To settle the libel case, a judge ruled that Nguoi Viet Daily News may take over its competitor.

== Today ==
In 2018, the newspaper employed five reporters with fifty total staff. It continues to cover local news in Little Saigon and discuss underreported issues relevant to Vietnamese communities.

The newspaper's print circulation was 10,000 in 2018, a decrease from its average of 18,000 the decade prior. Due to industry changes, it is transitioning towards publication online. Its website has been attracting Vietnamese readers outside of the United States such as in Australia, France, and Vietnam. The paper had been struggling to capture the interest of second-generation Vietnamese-Americans whom are fluent in English.

Los Angeles Times reporter Anh Do, daughter of founder Yen Do, serves on the newspaper's board of directors.
