= Yen Ngoc Do =

American newspaper publisher (1941–2006)

Đỗ Ngọc Yến
- Born: 1941; Saigon, French Indochina
- Died: August 17, 2006 (aged 65); Fountain Valley, California, United States
- Education: University of Saigon
- Occupations: Journalist; publisher
- Organization: Người Việt Daily News
- Known for: Founder of Người Việt Daily News
- Spouse: Lã Phương Loan (m. 1963)
- Children: 4

Đỗ Ngọc Yến (1941 — August 17, 2006) was a Vietnamese American journalist and newspaper publisher. He was the founder of Người Việt Daily News, the oldest and largest Vietnamese-language daily publication in the United States.

Born in Southern Vietnam, Yến emigrated to the United States by the fall of Saigon, ultimately settling in Southern California. He has been praised for his leadership of the Người Việt newspaper and as an effective community leader for Little Saigon, Orange County. Journalism professor Jeffrey Brody has called Yến both a "pioneering journalist" and "the intellectual voice of Little Saigon".

== Biography ==
=== Early life ===
Yến was born in Saigon in 1941, the middle child of five siblings. His family was originally from Nam Định before moving to South Vietnam and sold French floral funerary wreaths. His father was a tailor who supported the Viet Minh and his mother was Catholic.

After placing 20^{th} in a exam taken by 3,000 applicants, he attended Trương Vĩnh Ký high school. He edited the school newspaper and distributed leaflets supporting the independence movement. He was arrested and suspended from school for leading student protests against the South Vietnamese government for scholarships and improved classrooms. After a self-study program, he obtained his diploma at the age of 22. He later attended the Saigon University of Literature but did not graduate. While at college, he studied philosophy and was a member of the executive committee of the Saigon Student Union, assisting in protests of Nguyễn Khánh's government.

Yến later worked as a reporter and editor for Vietnamese publications. During the Vietnam War, after conflict escalated during the late 1960s, Yến served as a combat correspondent for publications, such as Dai Dan Toc, an anti-establishment newspaper. He also worked as an interpreter for American and French journalists since in addition to his native Vietnamese, he spoke English, French, German and Chinese.

=== Emigration to the United States ===
Due to his reporting, Yến corresponded with an American professor who would eventually arrange for his family's evacuation. On April 26, 1975, Yến and his family left on a C-130 plane to the US hours before the fall of Saigon, arriving at Camp Pendleton.

Yến initially resettled in Santa Rosa in Northern California, finding work as a dishwasher at a fast-food restaurant. He later moved to Texas, working odd jobs, before ultimately settling in Southern California. In 1977, he had the opportunity to become managing director of the San Diego monthly magazine Hon Viet but felt unsatisfied due to being unable to cover the life of refugees.

=== Người Việt ===
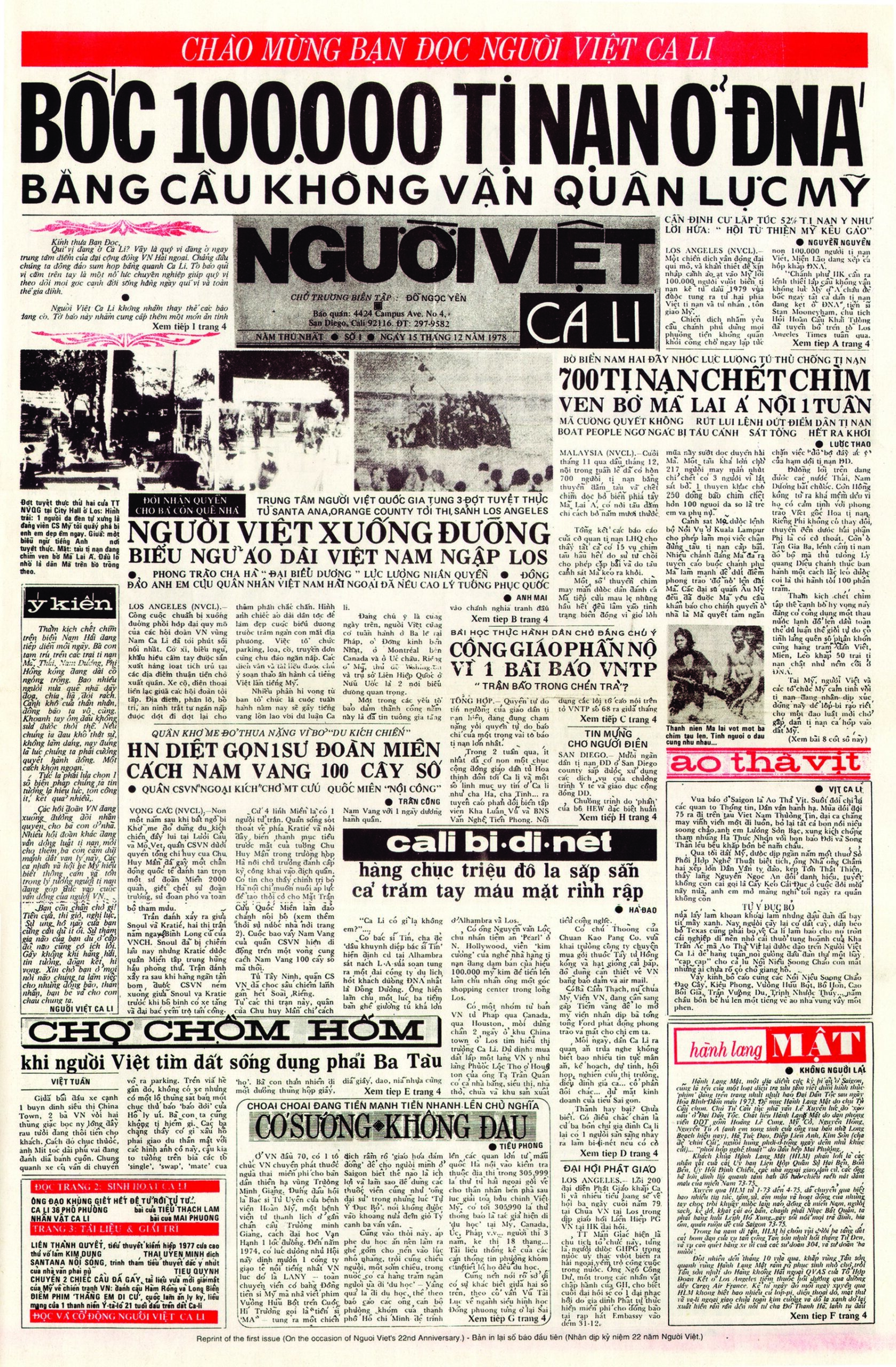
First issue of Người Việt Daily News, December 15, 1978

In 1978, Yến realized that a substantial number of Vietnamese boat people would soon arrive. He claimed that he was inspired to start a publication after learning that the communist government in Vietnam had confiscated all newspapers and books published before 1975.

Hence, with $4000 of savings that he made as a house painter and social worker, Yến published 2,000 copies of Người Việt's first issue. He served as both founding editor and publisher, distributing copies of the newspaper door-to-door. Issues initially sold for $6 for a subscription of three months. After publishing the first few issues in San Diego, Yến immediately moved to Orange County.

Yến strongly advocated for a free press, going so far as to fund other media competitors. In addition to providing information on topics aimed for American immigrants such as driver's licenses, taxes, and voting, he published translated post-war Vietnam stories and news from Vietnamese exiles. Yến also wrote about the price of a kilogram of rice, so that refugees could accurately consider the amount of money to send for remittances.

He regularly organized community events in Little Saigon, Orange County. In the early 1980s, after local children tested posted for tuberculosis, Yến organized a panel of Vietnamese and American doctors to assuage fears prevalent in the community.

In 1989, a group of 150 protested outside Yến's office after he showed photographs of Ho Chi Minh's tomb. Later, in 1994, after Yến defended a Vietnamese American's trip to Vietnam, 300 critics solicited an apology after storming his newspaper's office. Threatened with a boycott, Yến ultimately resigned as editor-in-chief.

=== Death and legacy ===
On August 17, 2006, Yến died in Fountain Valley, California due to complications from diabetes and kidney failure at the age of 65.

Tony Lam, a former Westminster City councilman, regarded Yến as "instrumental in working on getting the community on the right track". The Orange County Register calls Yến "one of Little Saigon’s most respected community leaders" The New York Times similarly has praised him as a "guiding force in the assimilation of refugees after the Vietnam War".

Người Việt has become the largest Vietnamese-language publication in the US. Ben Brazil of the Los Angeles Times writes that Người Việt continues to report based on Yến's ethos on the coverage of Vietnamese communities. As of 2019, his portrait is hung up in a hallway in the Người Việt office.

== Personal life ==
In 1963, Yến married Lã Phương Loan, a schoolteacher, in Saigon. He had four children.
