= List of flags of the Republic of Vietnam Military Forces =

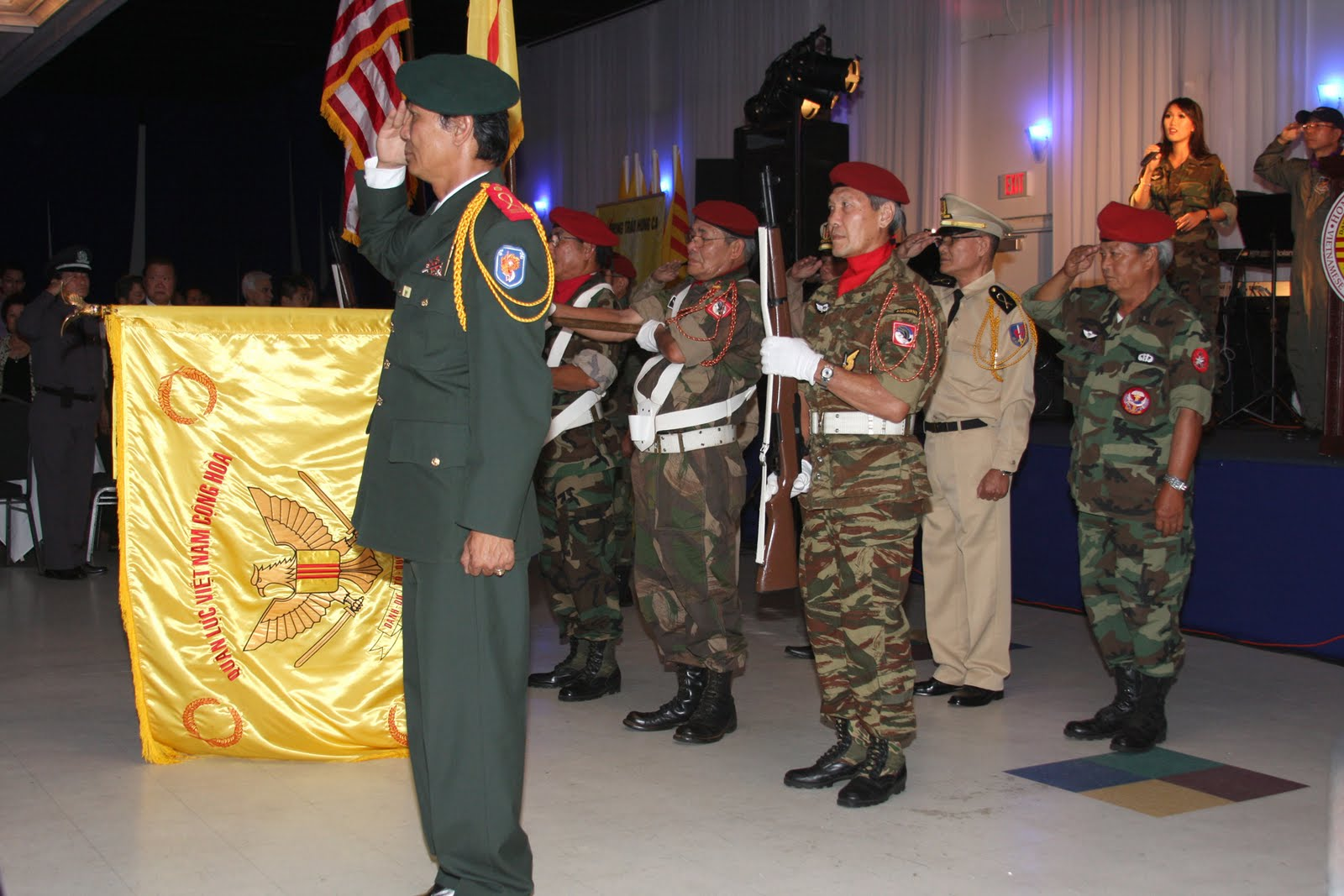
Former South Vietnamese military veterans saluting the South Vietnamese flag on Armed Forces Day in Orlando, Florida.

The following are the flags of the Republic of Vietnam Military Forces (Vietnamese: Quân lực Việt Nam Cộng hòa). Most of the flags used by the South Vietnam military between 1955 and 1975.

Flag	Date	Use	Description
	1967–1975	Presidential flag.	
	1967–1975	Flag of the Minister of National Defense.	
	1967–1975	Flag of the Commander of the ARVN Joint General Staff.	
	1955–1965	Armed Forces flag.	
	1965–1975	War flag.	The emblem Eagle centered on national flag (3:4).
	1965–1975	Armed Forces flag.	Yellow field with the emblem Eagle (RVNMF).
	1965–1975	Army flag.	Red field with the emblem Eagle (ARVN).
	1965–1975	Air Force flag.	
	1965–1975	Naval flag.	
	1955–1975	Naval ensign.	
	1955–1975	Flag of Saint Tran.	

== Military schools and academies ==
Dong De Military School (1957 - 1975)

The Junior Military Academy

The Military Medical School

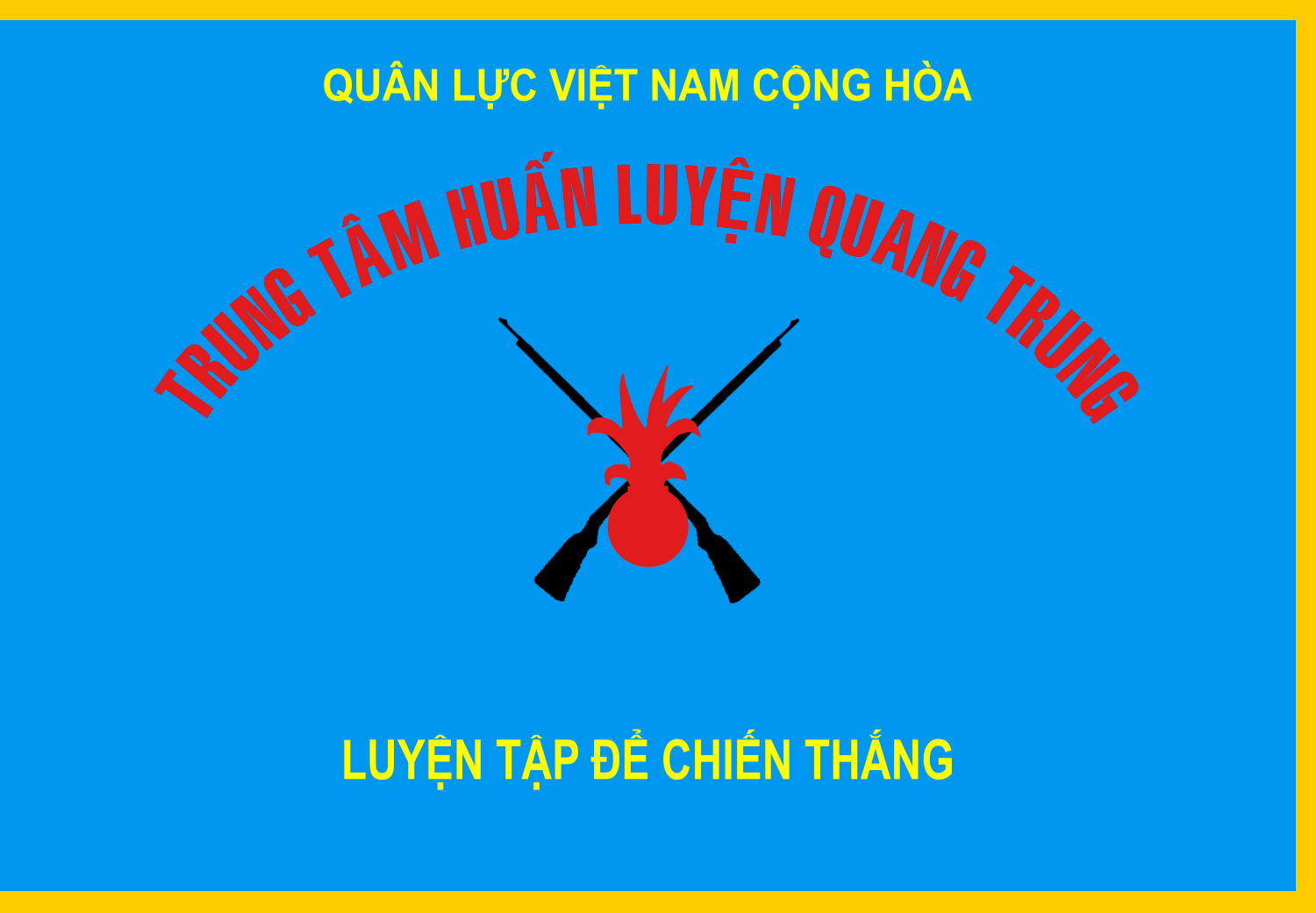
Quang Trung National Training Center

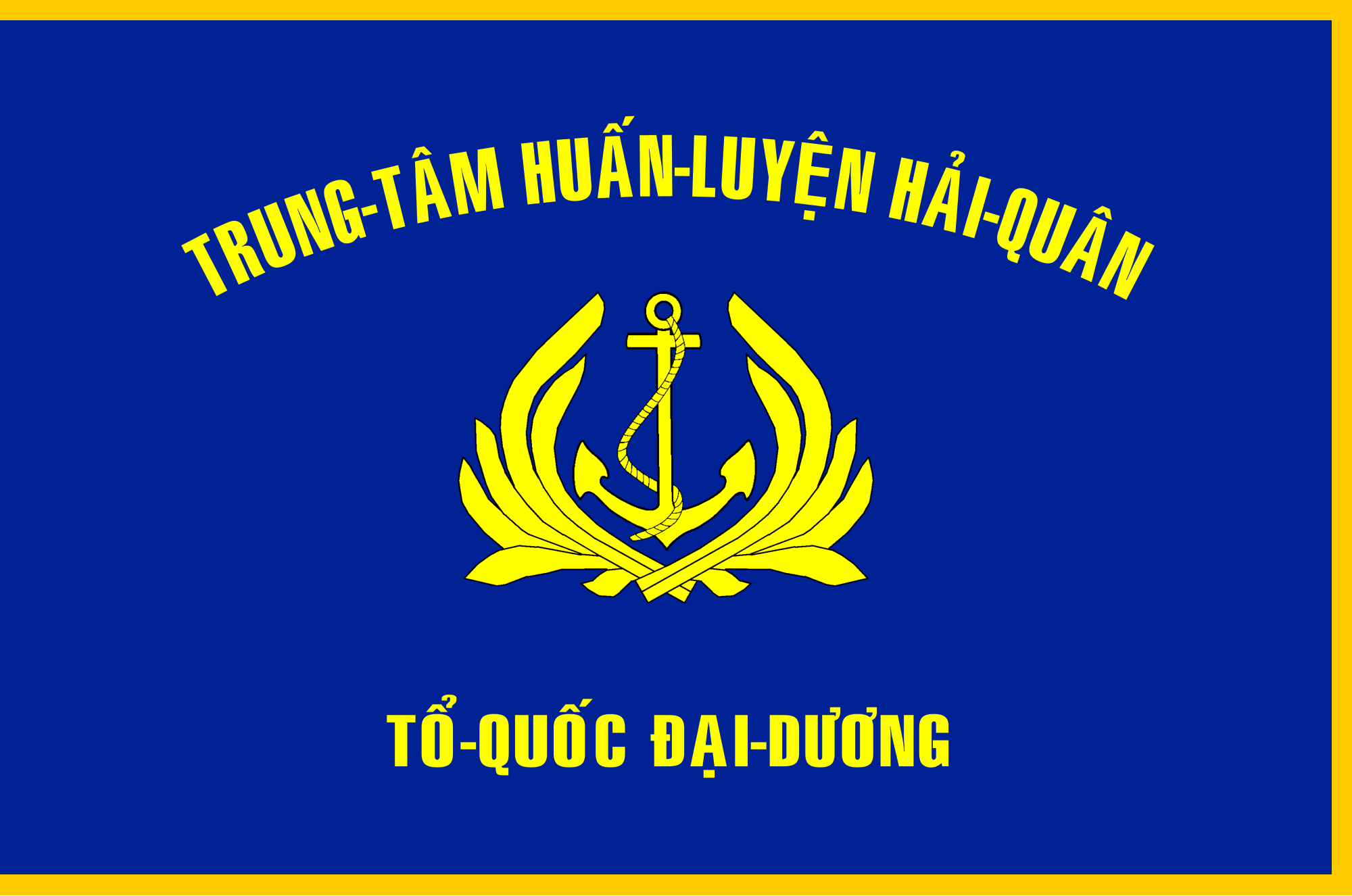
Nha Trang Naval Training Center

The Military Dog Training Center

== Armed services ==
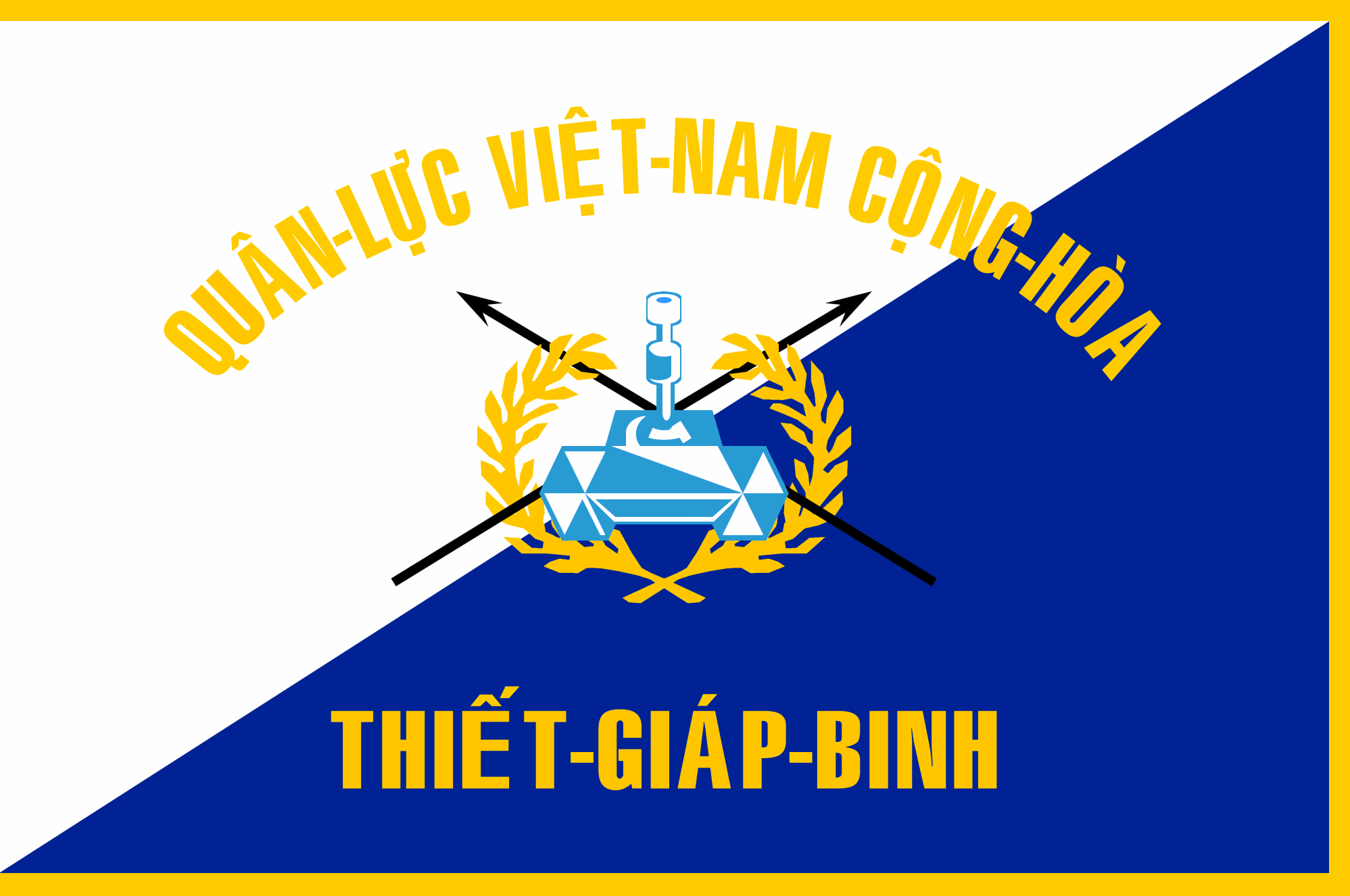
The Armored Cavalry

The Artillery

Military Engineering

The Air Force

The Capital Securities Corps

The Military Police Corps

=== Corps ===
I Corps

II Corps

III Corps

IV Corps

=== Divisions ===
The Airborne Division

The Marine Division

2nd Division

3rd Division

7th Division
9th Division

18th Division

25th Division

=== Regiments ===
The Regiments of Cadets of the Military Academy of Dalat

=== Battalions ===
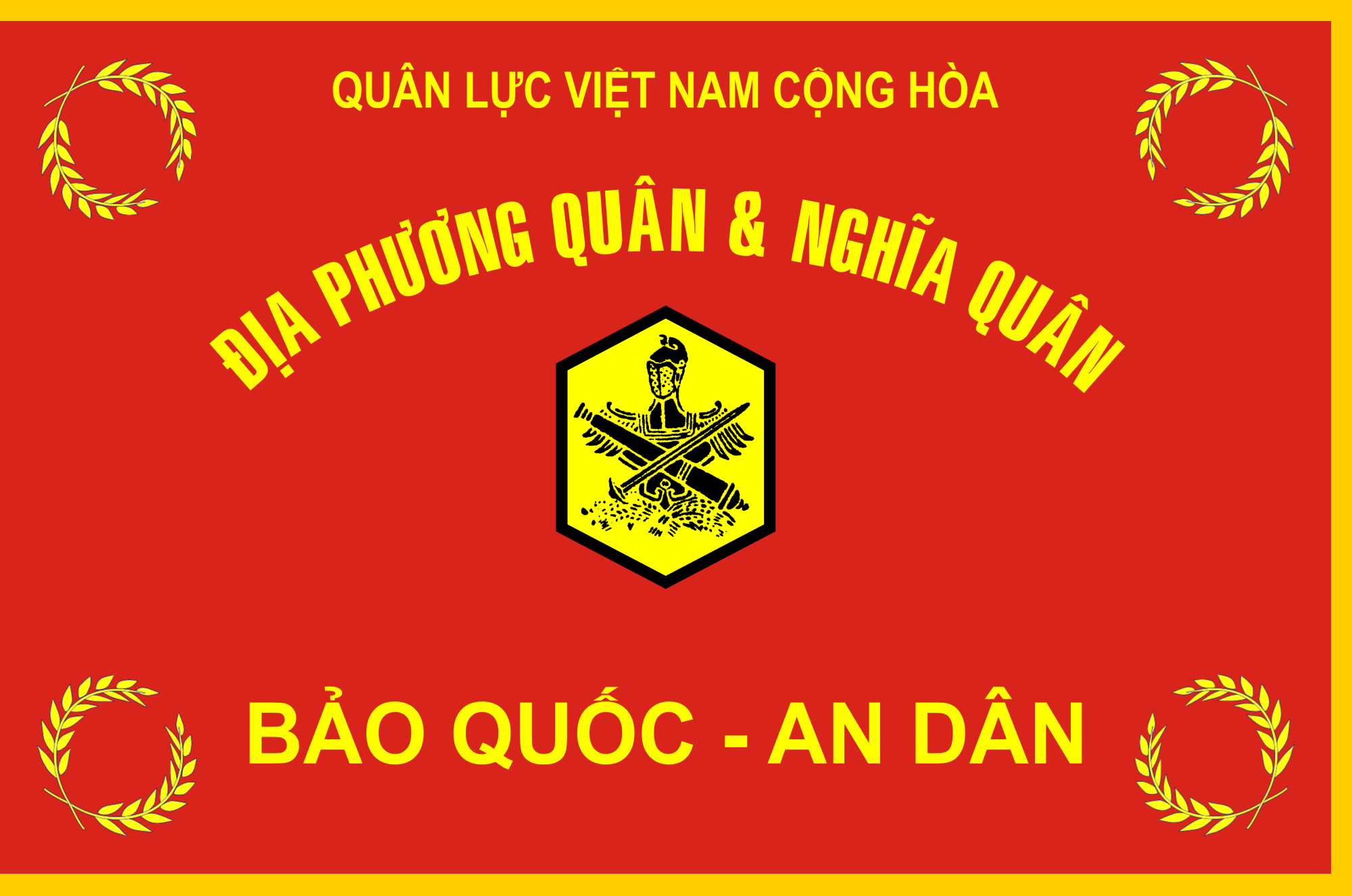
Regional Forces and Popular Forces

Vietnamese Rangers

== See also ==
- Republic of Vietnam Military Forces
- List of flags of Vietnam
- Flag of South Vietnam
