= Flag of South Vietnam =

Former national flag

State of Vietnam Republic of Vietnam
- "Heritage and Freedom Flag" (Lá cờ Tự do và Di sản) "Yellow Flag with Three Red Stripes" (Cờ vàng ba sọc đỏ)
- Use: Civil and state flag
- Proportion: 2:3
- Adopted: 2 June 1948 (Provisional Central Government of Vietnam); 1949 (State of Vietnam); 1955 (Republic of Vietnam)
- Relinquished: 30 April 1975
- Design: A yellow flag with three horizontal red stripes.
- Designed by: various claims
- Flag of the RVNMF
- Use: War flag
- Design: A yellow flag with three red stripes, and the emblem of RVNMF (red eagle) in the middle.
- Designed by: Design is a variant of the flag of South Vietnam.

The flag of South Vietnam was first introduced on 2 June 1948 as the official symbol of the French-associated Provisional Central Government of Vietnam, later served as the national flag of the State of Vietnam and the Republic of Vietnam (commonly known as South Vietnam) from 1949 up until the Fall of Saigon on 30 April 1975. The design consists of a yellow background with three red horizontal stripes through the middle, representing northern, central, and southern Vietnam.

Although the Republic of Vietnam ceased to exist in 1975, the flag is still represented by the Vietnamese diaspora as a major anti-communist symbol. The display of the South Vietnamese flag, while not explicitly banned, is criminalized in Vietnam. Since June 2002, several American governmental bodies adopted resolutions recognizing the former flag as the Vietnamese Heritage and Freedom Flag.

== History ==
=== Nguyễn dynasty ===
Protectorate flag of Annam and Tonkin, 1885 to 9 March 1945

Long tinh flag of the Nguyễn dynasty, 1920s–1945

During the reign of Emperor Gia Long (1802–1820), the yellow flag was also used as the symbol of the Empire of Vietnam. This was continued as the emperor's flag when the court of Huế became a French protectorate. Later the flag added a red bend on two sides.

After the deportation and exile of the emperors Thành Thái and Duy Tân by the French colonialists, the new pro-French emperor Khải Định introduced new imperial flag as a yellow flag with single horizontal band of red, following the Imperial Order of the Dragon of Annam. Formally known as the Long tinh flag, it was the official flag of the Nguyễn court.

In 1945 with the French ousted by Japan, Prime Minister Trần Trọng Kim of the newly restored Empire of Vietnam adopted another variant of the yellow flag. It included three red bands, but the middle band was broken to form the Quẻ Ly flag. Derived from the trigrams, Quẻ Ly is the third of the Bát Quái (the Eight Trigrams – Ba gua): Càn (乾), Đoài (兌), Ly (離), Chấn (震), Tốn (巽), Khảm (坎), Cấn (艮), Khôn (坤). It was chosen to symbolize the sun, fire, light, and civilization. And most importantly, it represents the southern lands under the "Later Heaven" order, that is Vietnam. This flag was used briefly from June to August 1945 when Emperor Bảo Đại abdicated.

=== Provisional Central Government of Vietnam and the State of Vietnam ===
Flag of the Empire of Vietnam, 1945

Flag of the Autonomous Republic of Cochinchina from 1946, a prototype of the South Vietnam flag.

On 2 June 1948, the prime minister of the Provisional Central Government of Vietnam, Brigadier General Nguyễn Văn Xuân, signed the decree with the specifications for the Vietnamese national flag as follows: "The national emblem is a flag of yellow background, the height of which is equal to two-thirds of its width. In the middle of the flag and along its entire width, there are three horizontal red bands. Each band has a height equal to one-fifteenth of the width. These three red bands are separated from one another by a space of the band's height." Another decree on June 14 reaffirmed the same flag design.

The new national flag was raised for the first time on 5 June 1948 on a boat named Dumont d'Urville outside of Hạ Long Bay during the signing of the Halong Bay Agreements (Accords de la baie d’Along) by High Commissioner Emile Bollaert and Nguyễn Văn Xuân.

A detailed design of the flag appeared on the newspaper on 3 June 1948, and again on the next day (with correction to the flag ratio). The residents of Hanoi were requested to display the flag at their home on 5 June 1948 to celebrate the Hạ Long Bay event.

The 1947 Quẻ Càn flag, proposed by Bảo Đại as the future flag of the State of Vietnam. It is visually a straightforward derivative of the Empire of Vietnam's Quẻ Ly standard.

The flag's design drew on earlier Vietnamese flags and has been attributed to several people, including Lê Văn Đệ, Tôn Thất Sa, and the group of Trần Văn Đôn and Lê Văn Kim. When the former emperor Bảo Đại was made chief of state in 1949, this design was adopted as the flag of the State of Vietnam.

The three red bands have the divination sign of Quẻ Càn, the first of the Eight Trigrams mentioned above. Quẻ Càn represents heaven. Based on the traditional worldview of the Vietnamese people, Quẻ Càn also denotes the South (as of the "Earlier Heaven" order), the Vietnamese Nation, Vietnamese people, and the people's power. Another interpretation places the three red bands as symbols of the three regions of Vietnam: North, Central, and South.

=== Republic of Vietnam and later ===
Banner of the National Liberation Front of South Vietnam and later the flag of the competing Provisional Revolutionary Government of the Republic of South Vietnam. It briefly became the nominal national flag for the entire South Vietnamese territory after the Fall of Saigon.

With the foundation of the republic in 1955, the flag was adopted by the successor state, the Republic of Vietnam (more commonly known as South Vietnam). It was the national flag for the entire duration of that state's existence (1955–1975) from the First Republic to the Second Republic. With the fall of Saigon on 30 April 1975 and the end of the Vietnam War, the Republic of Vietnam ceased to exist alongside its flag as a state symbol. It has since been adopted by many in the Vietnamese diaspora communities that left after the war to symbolically distance themselves from the Communist government, and remains as an alternative symbol for national unity or as a tool of protest against the current government.

Although Vietnam's law currently does not explicitly prohibit the display of the South Vietnamese flag, its use is de facto criminalized under the provision of "Making, storing, spreading information, materials, items for the purpose of opposing the State of Socialist Republic of Vietnam", along with other anti-government offenses, effectively restricting its usage beyond limited educational contexts. Since the flag is associated with the large anti-communist Vietnamese communities worldwide, the government of Vietnam views it as a symbol of treason and dissent against it. Some people in Vietnam use "Cali" (sometimes spelled "Kali") as a pejorative for political opponents, which derives from the U.S. state of California, where the largest group of anti-communist Vietnamese people live.

== Political significance ==
The flag of the former South Vietnam is popular with the case of Vietnamese Americans, Vietnamese Australians, and other Vietnamese around the world who fled Vietnam after the war, who call it the "Vietnamese Heritage and Freedom Flag", and they started the Yellow Flag Campaign movement to struggle for recognitions for their political identity.

In the United States, Canada, France, Germany, Netherlands, Norway, the United Kingdom, Australia, and New Zealand, few Vietnamese immigrants of that time period use the current flag of Vietnam, which many of them consider offensive. Instead, they prefer to use the flag of South Vietnam in its place to represent them.

=== Official recognition ===
- In 1965, the South Vietnamese flag's design was incorporated into the Vietnam Service Medal which was created by President Lyndon Johnson and designed by Thomas Hudson Jones and Mercedes Lee.
- In 2003, the Virginian state government rejected a bill that would have recognized the South Vietnamese flag.
- From 2002 onward, the lobbying efforts of Vietnamese Americans resulted in the state governments of Virginia, Hawaii, Georgia, Colorado, Florida, Texas, Oklahoma, Louisiana, Ohio, California, Missouri, Pennsylvania, and Michigan recognizing it as the symbol of the Vietnamese American Community. Also, at least 15 counties and 85 cities in 20 states have also adopted similar resolutions.
- In early 2008, Jason Kenney, Minister of Immigration, Refugees and Citizenship, posted an announcement on his website, declaring that the Canadian government recognized the flag of the Republic of Vietnam as the symbol of the Vietnamese-Canadian community. Further, he declared that "attempts to disparage [the flag] are a deeply troubling attack on one of Canada's ethnic communities and on the principles of multiculturalism." In May 2008, he made a speech at an Army of the Republic of Vietnam rally, lending support to the program.
- From 2015 onward in Australia, the City Councils of Maribyrnong, Greater Dandenong, Yarra, Fairfield, Port Adelaide Enfield, and Brimbank, respectively, have passed motions recognizing the "Cờ Vàng" Vietnamese Heritage Flag.
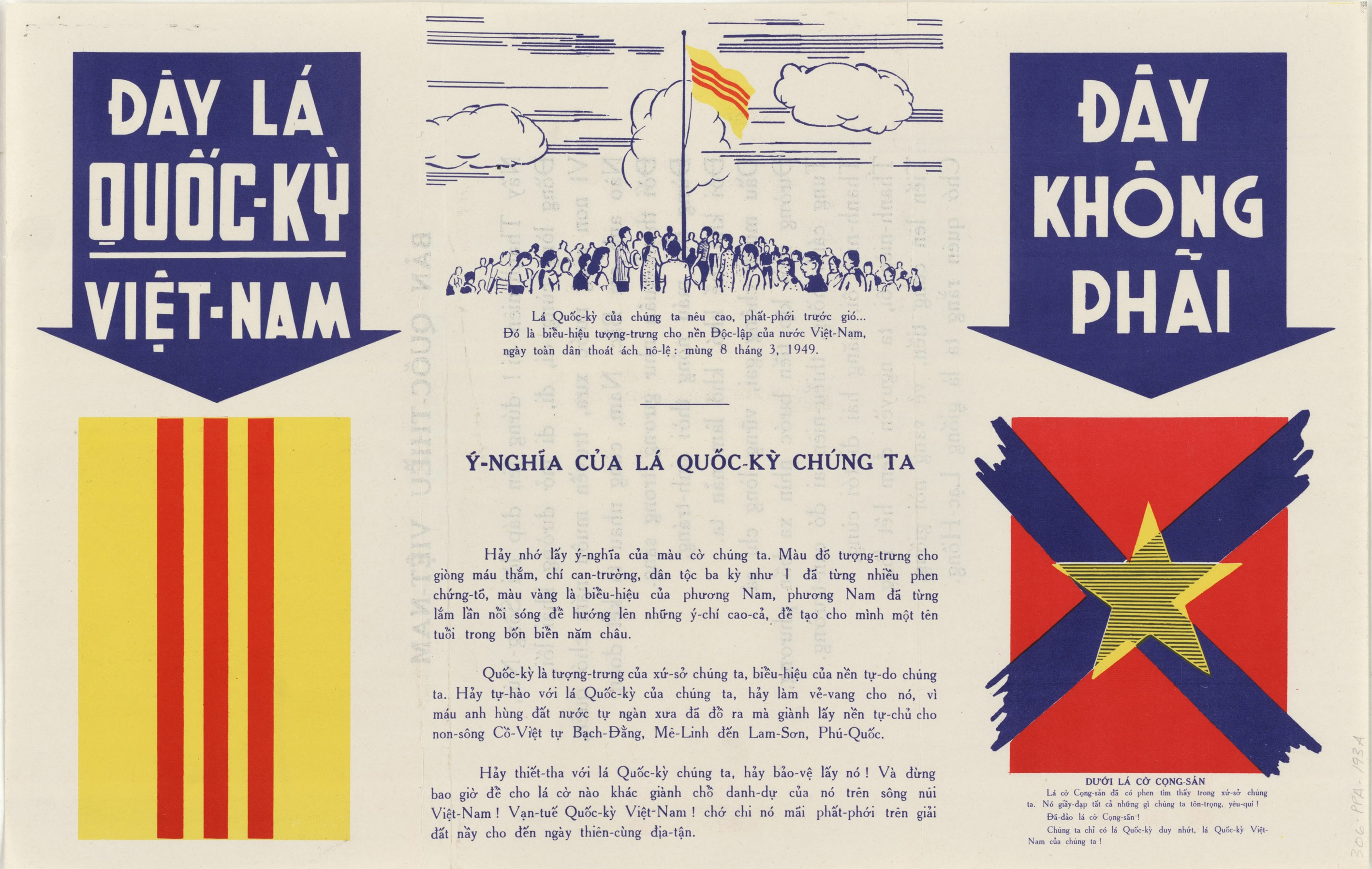
Propaganda poster "This is our true national flag".

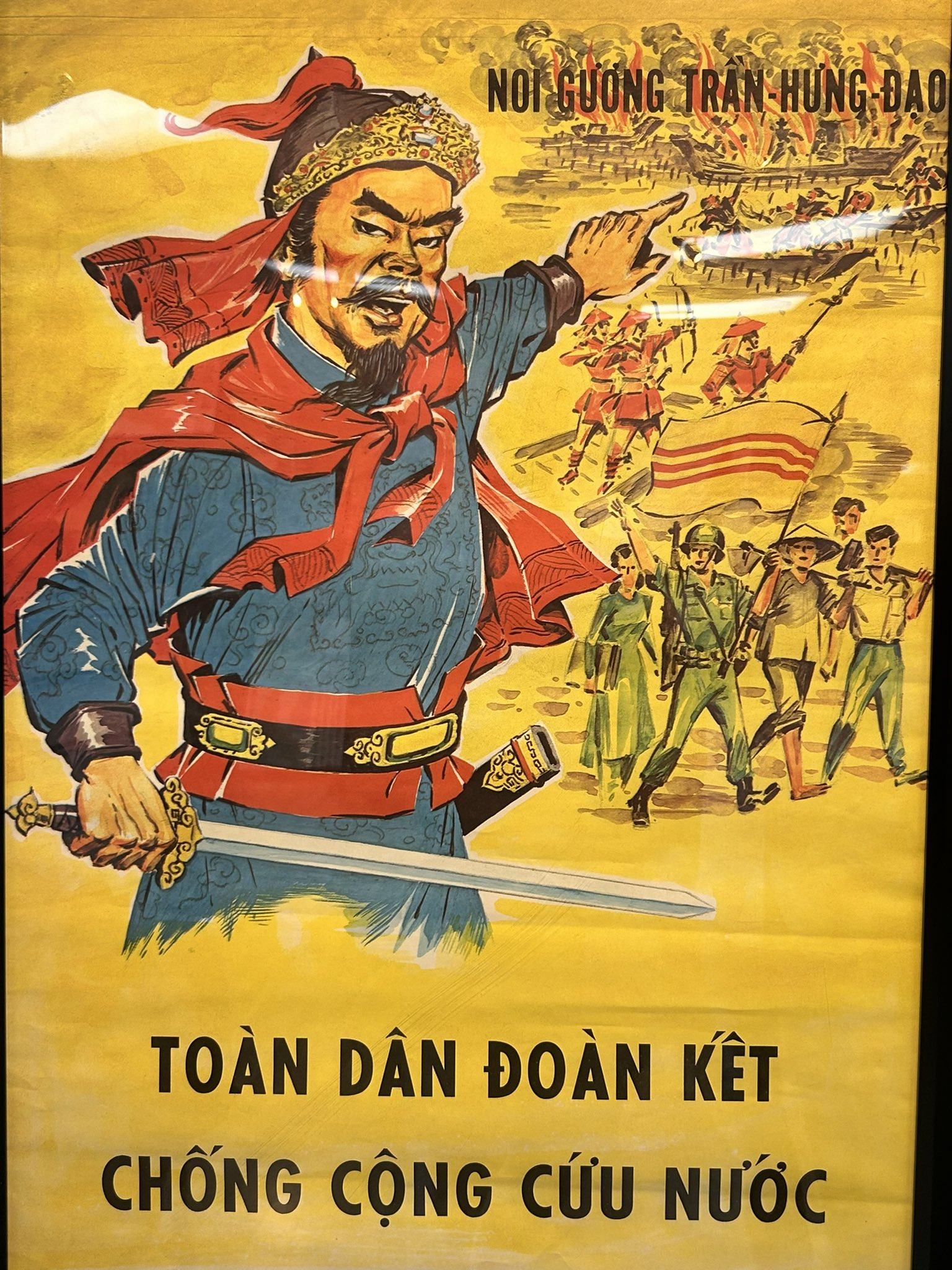
Propaganda poster "Following [the examples of] Trần Hưng Đạo, all the people unite to fight against communism to save the nation".

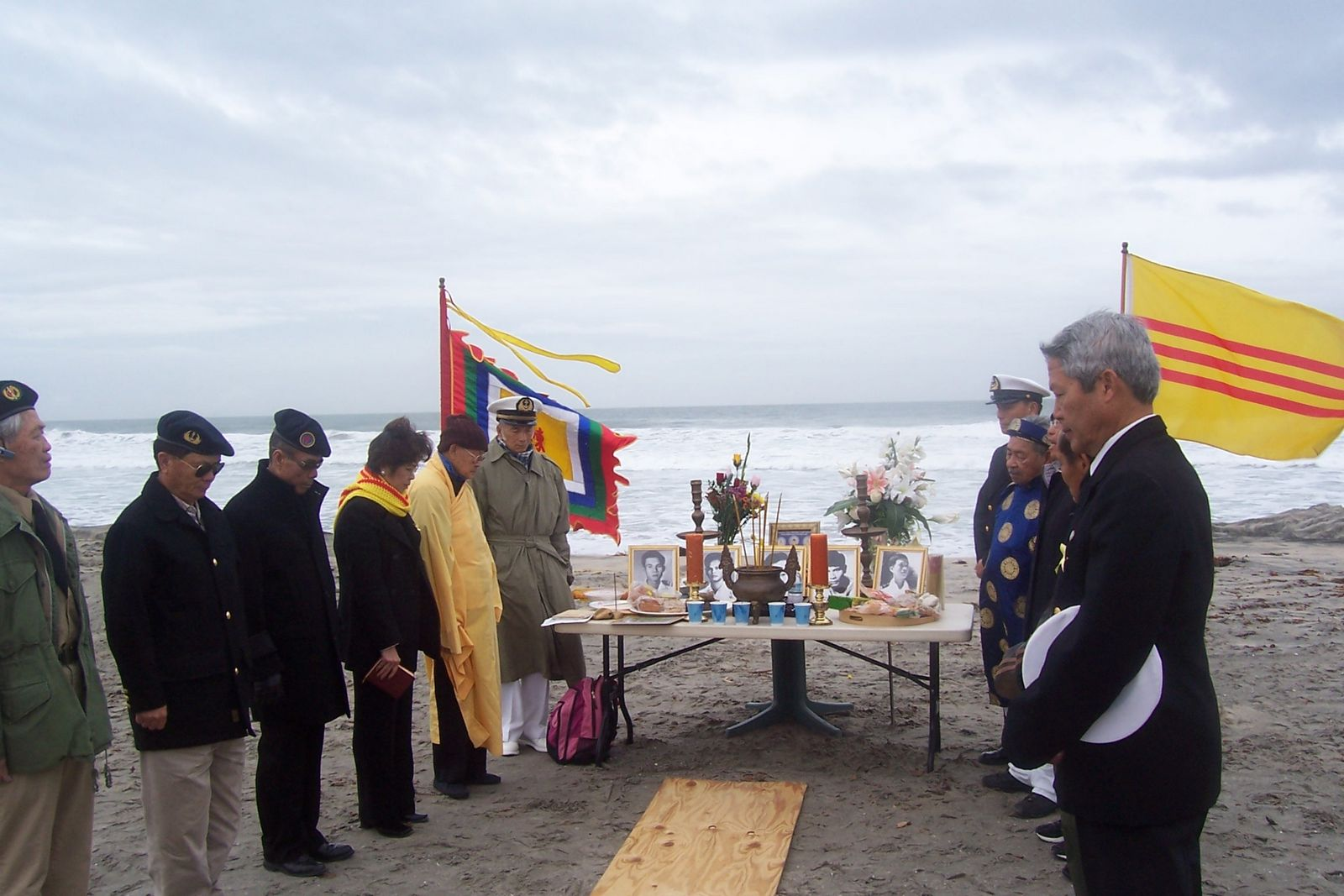
Memorial for Battle of the Paracel Islands, 2004.

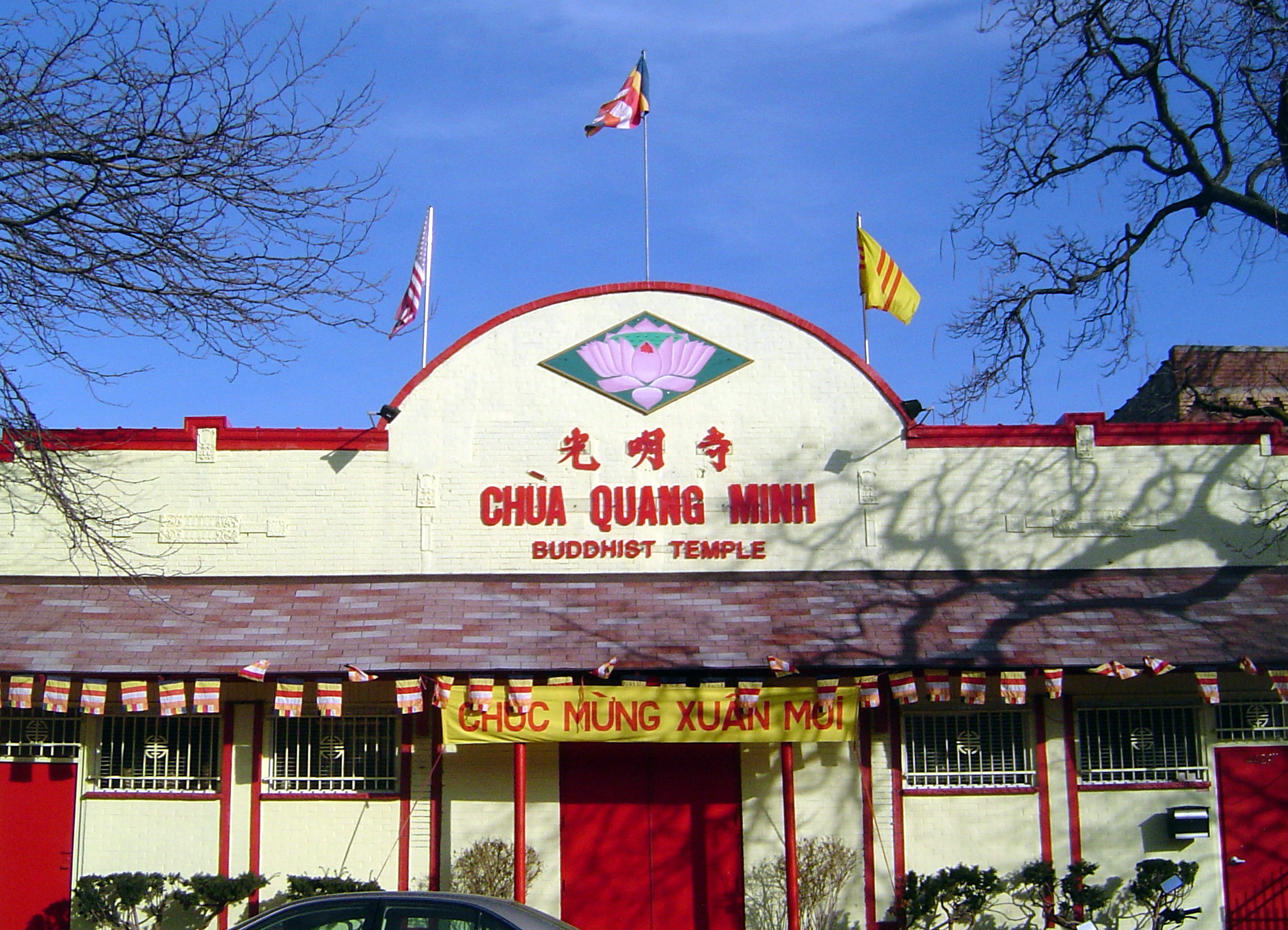
Flown over a Buddhist temple in Illinois, alongside the U.S. flag.

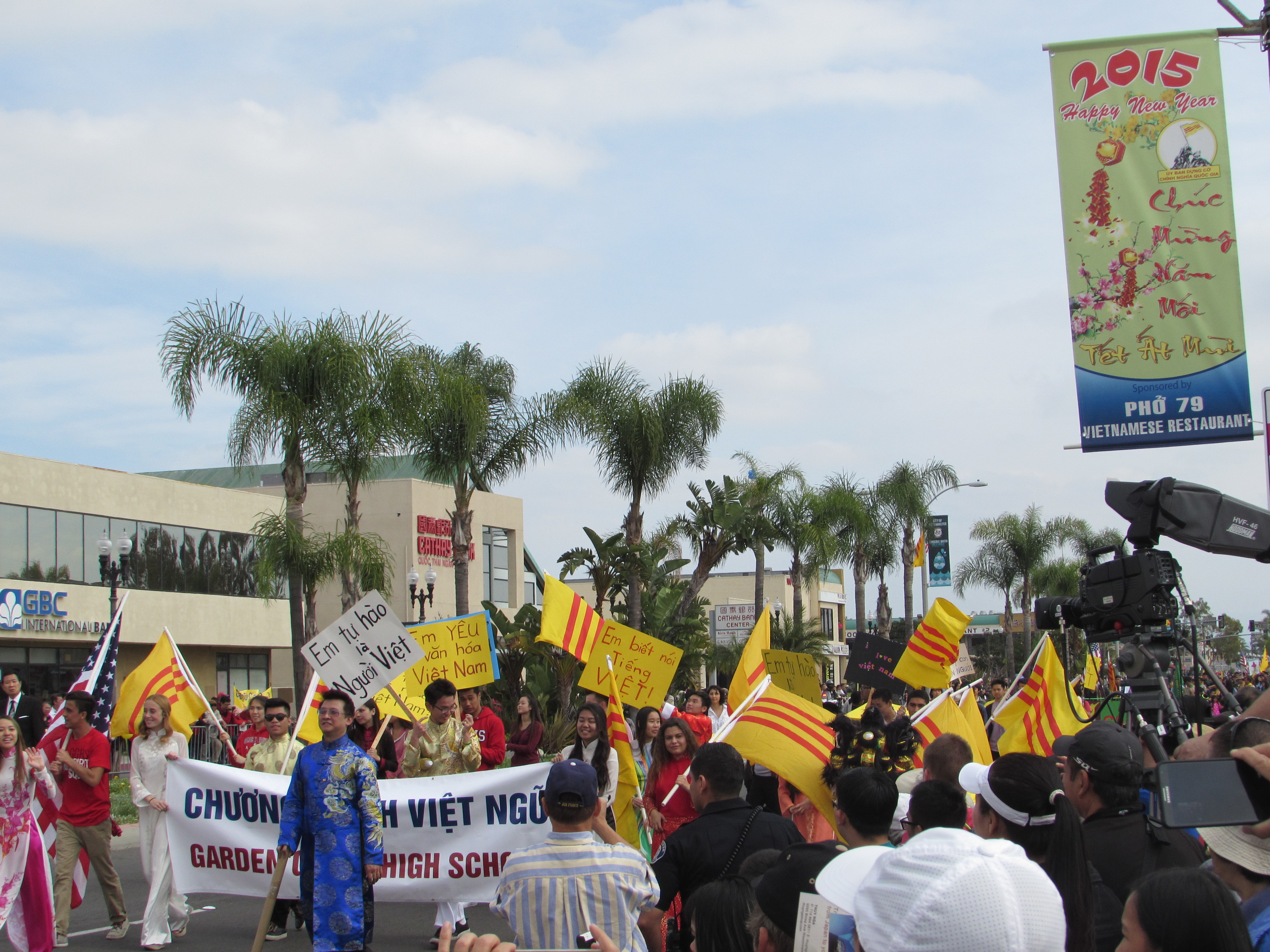
Vietnamese language school parade in Garden Grove, California

=== Controversies ===
- When a Vietnamese-American videotape store owner displayed the current flag of Vietnam and a photo of Ho Chi Minh in front of his store in Westminster, California in 1999, a month-long protest against it climaxed when 15,000 people held a candlelight vigil one night, sparking the Hi-Tek incident (Hi-Tek was the name of the store).
- A faux pas by the United States Postal Service in using the current Vietnamese flag in a brochure to represent the Vietnamese American community that it serves caused outrage among Vietnamese Americans and resulted in an apology.
- In 2004, many Vietnamese American students at the California State University, Fullerton threatened to walk out at their graduation ceremony when the university chose to use the current flag of Vietnam to represent its Vietnamese students. The Vietnamese-American students demanded that the university use the former flag of South Vietnam instead. This resulted in the university scrapping all foreign flags for the ceremony.
- In 2006, Vietnamese-American students at the University of Texas at Arlington protested against the use of the Vietnamese flag in the Hall of Flags in Nedderman Hall and the exclusion of the South Vietnamese flag at a cultural diversity show during International Week. After weeks of protests, the university decided to scrap all flags from the display.
- During World Youth Day 2008 in Sydney, tensions flared between the 800 Vietnamese pilgrims who used the flag of the Socialist Republic of Vietnam and the 2300 Vietnamese Australian pilgrims who used the Republic of Vietnam flag.
- In 2008, many protested against Nguoi Viet Daily News, a Vietnamese-language newspaper in Orange County, California, for publishing a photograph of an art installation depicting a foot spa bearing the colours of the flag.
- In October 2014, the Vietnamese Student Association chapter at the University of Arizona discovered that the university had removed the South Vietnamese flag from the campus bookstore's Flag Display (which includes flags from all over the world to celebrate the diversity found among students). Afterwards, the VSA chapter launched an online petition in protest of the decision. The university then responded and explained that the removal was due to a misunderstanding amongst the staff. It then apologized and promised to reinstall the flag afterwards.
- Some theories claim the flag was first introduced by Emperor Thành Thái via an imperial decree in 1890. Some views even claimed this flag (called The Yellow Flag for short) is the first true "national flag" of the Vietnamese people for it reflects the aspiration and hope of the people, not just the emperors, for independence and unification of the Viet nation. However, Flags of the World opposed these claims, arguing that no such flag showed up in images from Thành Thái's era, and associated claims on the Internet are not credible. Phạm Quang Tuấn, professor of Chemical Engineering from University of New South Wales, traced the claim – that the yellow flag with three red stripes had originated during Thành Thái's reign – back, at the earliest, to Nguyễn Đình Sài, a former member of the anti-communist organization Việt Tân, who had written the article Quốc Kỳ Việt Nam: Nguồn Gốc và Lẽ Chính Thống (The National Flag of Viet Nam: Its Origin and Legitimacy) in September 2004. To back up his claim, Nguyền Đình Sài cited a webpage from Worldstatesmen website by Ben Cahoon, an American researcher affiliated with University of Connecticut. However, Nguyễn Đình Sài admitted Cahoon "did not name any specific documents" for Cahoon's claim that the yellow flag with three red stripes was used between 1890 and 1920.
- During the 6 January United States Capitol attack, many South Vietnamese flags were seen in the crowd of rioters. There were mixed reactions among Vietnamese Americans in Southern California. Forty-five Vietnamese American community advocates, politicians, and business leaders signed a statement condemning the use of the South Vietnamese flag in this context, and various Vietnamese American government officials also wrote statements opposing such use.
- During a 2022 FIFA World Cup qualifying match in Melbourne between Australia and Vietnam, Vietnamese broadcasters delayed showing the match by ten minutes due to several Vietnamese Australians waving South Vietnamese flags in support of Australia. However, local security did try to prevent the flags from going into the stands. A similar issue occurred when Vietnam also delayed broadcasting a qualifying match against Japan that year, when South Vietnamese flags were found in the crowd in Saitama.
- In 2023, Vietnam took issue with an Australian coin featuring the flag in its design to honour Australians who fought in the Vietnam War.
- Australian singer Hanni, who was born to Vietnamese parents and herself a member of the South Korean girl group NewJeans, faced backlash from Vietnamese fans in February 2023 due to allegations that some of her family members support the flag. Hanni has never publicly expressed any opinions on the Vietnam War.
- In August 2024, many Vietnamese celebrities have been criticized by fans and media for performing overseas at events where the flag appeared in the background in the past.
- In 2024, at the Vietnam Military History Museum in Hanoi, an exhibition featuring the flag drew many Vietnamese students, who posted photos of it on social media with derogatory captions. Los Angeles Times cited this as an example in its reporting on communist-aligned Vietnamese nationalism.

== Specifications ==
A 2 June 1948 ordinance defined the construction of the flag in the following way: The national emblem is a flag of yellow background, the height of which is equal to two-thirds of its width. In the middle of the flag and along its entire width, there are three horizontal red bands. Each band has a height equal to one-fifteenth of the width. These three red bands are separated from one another by a space of the band's height. Hence it is blazoned as Or, three bars Gules.

Construction sheet

== Computer encoding ==
Unicode includes an emoji flag sequence for the flag of Vietnam but not the flag of South Vietnam. Sequences depicting national flags are based on ISO 3166-1 alpha-2 codes; the Socialist Republic of Vietnam took over South Vietnam's VN code in 1977. In 2017, a Change.org petition asked Apple Inc. and the Unicode Consortium to add a South Vietnamese flag emoji. By 2023, it had collected more than 17,000 signatures. In 2025, the San Jose City Council (home to one of the largest Vietnamese American communities) unanimously passed a resolution calling on the Unicode Consortium, based in nearby Mountain View, California, to include the "Vietnamese Heritage and Freedom Flag" in the Unicode character repertoire.

== See also ==
- List of flags of the Republic of Vietnam Military Forces
- List of flags of Vietnam
- White-red-white flag
