= The Little Saigon News =

Weekly newspaper

Saigon Nhỏ
- Tiếng nói của người Việt Nam không Cộng sản
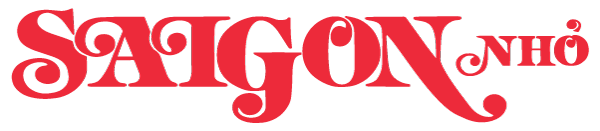
- Type: Weekly newspaper
- Founder: Hoàng Dược Thảo
- Editor-in-chief: Mạnh Kim
- Founded: 1985
- Language: Vietnamese
- Headquarters: 14781 Moran St; Westminster, California 92683, U.S.
- Circulation: 70,000 (as of 2015)
- Website: saigonnhonews.com

The Little Saigon News (Vietnamese: Sàigòn Nhỏ) is a weekly publication for the Vietnamese American community in the United States. It is based out of Orange County, California.

== History ==
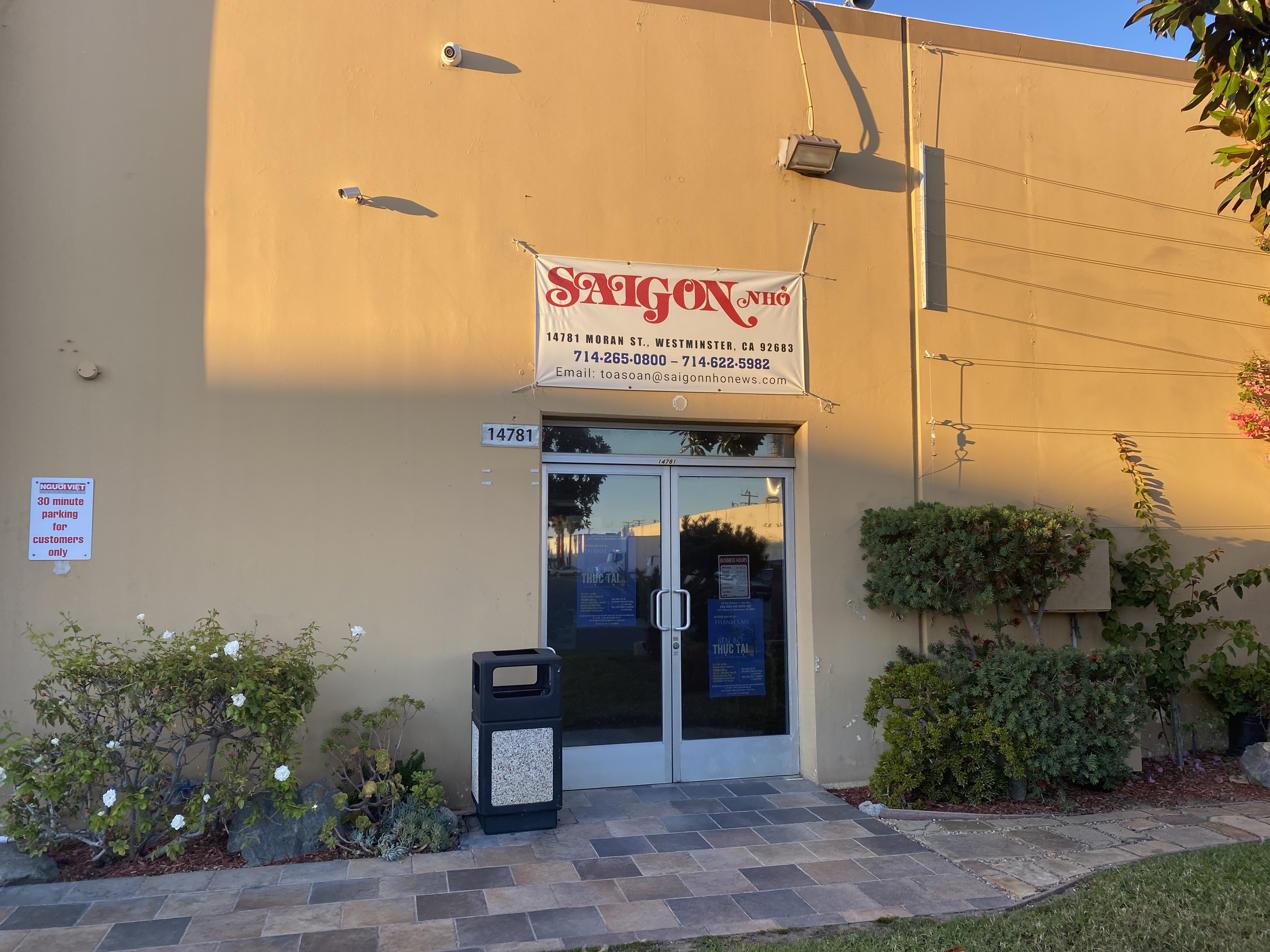
Office of The Little Saigon News in Westminster, CA

The Little Saigon News was founded in Westminster, California in 1985 as a weekly tabloid by Hoàng Dược Thảo, (Note: In this Vietnamese name, the surname is Hoàng. In accordance with Vietnamese custom, this person should be referred to by the given name, Thảo.) or Brigitte Huynh. Thảo claims that she created the newspaper due to her dream of seeing "the Communist government [of Vietnam] collapse". It was named after the Little Saigon, Orange County where it was founded.

In the late 2000s, it began publishing a daily newspaper in addition to its magazine. In 2009, the Los Angeles Times considered it one of five Vietnamese dailies.

On July 2012, The Little Saigon News published an article written by Thảo accusing rival newspaper Nguoi Viet Daily News of being a communist front. In December 2014, Orange County Superior Court jurors awarded Nguoi Viet Daily News a $4.5-million verdict in their defamation case against Little Saigon Daily News. The court later affirmed the jury's ruling in March 2015. On April 13, 2015, The Little Saigon News filed for Chapter 11 bankruptcy protection. To settle the libel case, a judge ruled that Nguoi Viet Daily News may take over its competitor.

== Today ==
In 2015, The Little Saigon News had 19 local staff and some freelancers. It earned $3 million in revenue in 2014.

Hao-Nhien Vu, a blogger on the politics of Orange County Vietnamese, considered The Little Saigon News an authority on political issues, noting that for some locations such as Philadelphia, it was the only media available in Vietnamese.

It claimed to have a circulation of 70,000 in thirty-one cities throughout the United States such as Seattle and D.C.
