= Migrant nail salon workers in the United States =

A migrant nail salon worker is a nail technician, manicurist, esthetician, or masseuse working in a migrant, often Asian–owned nail salon in America. These workers are mostly women, including immigrants from Vietnam, South Korea, China, South America and Central America. The majority of women who work in these nail salons are paid low wages, exposed to dangerous chemicals because of weak regulations, and develop complicated relationships with their clients, largely due to language differences and contradicting views on what constitutes quality customer service. Most Korean-owned nail salons are located in New York, and in reaction to a 2015 New York Times exposé documenting corruption within the state's nail salon industry, Gov. Andrew Cuomo created the New York State Nail Industry Enforcement Task Force, and signed into law stricter salon regulations and required the posting of wage bonds.

== Migrant nail salon workforce ==
There are several factors influencing why so many immigrant women work in Korean nail salons. It often has to do with the fact that they do not have to be proficient in English in order to do their jobs, they get paid in cash, the hours are somewhat flexible, and if they are undocumented they will struggle to get a job elsewhere. They are often introduced to this work through family, friends, church members, or neighbors, though some do find work through ad sections in Korean newspapers.

Another reason nail salon workers join the industry is that they do not always have to become licensed. Depending on the state it can take hundreds of hours to get a license. Sometimes a worker has to have graduated high school, or have a certain level of English proficiency. Often the beauty schools only teach in English, making it difficult for immigrants to obtain their license. Despite this being illegal, many employers hire unlicensed workers anyway.

In some cases employers make new employees pay to get the job and to be taught how to do manicures.

=== Ethnic hierarchies ===
Koreans own around seventy to eighty percent of the nail salons in New York, and four percent of foreign born salon workers come from South Korea. There is a socio-ethnic hierarchy in the state's nail salon industry. Korean workers are often paid more and can find jobs in more expensive areas. Some Korean salon owners have even been vocal about their low opinions of non-Korean workers, and some Latina and Chinese workers have talked about facing discrimination and ostracization in Korean-owned salons. In 2012 a group of Chinese workers sued the Korean nail salon chain Babi Nail Salons for paying them $3.00 or less a day, suffering abusive behavior from the owner, not being allowed to take breaks, and dealing with racist comments. They won the lawsuit and were supposed to collect over $400,000 in damages, but the owner has only paid them a small portion, citing that he does not have the money.

The president of the Korean Nail Salon Association of New York denied any widespread racial or ethnic prejudice from Korean business owners toward non-Korean workers.

=== Language, employers, and customer service ===
For Korean immigrant women entering the nail salon industry, it can be very helpful for them to have an employer who also speaks their language. Sometimes it is the only way they can get work. A worker's low English proficiency can be taken advantage of by employers, because they know that their workers are unlikely to find another job. Mistreatment, low wages, and long hours are often a result of this imbalance.

Language is also a source of tension and contention between workers and customers in Korean nail salons. It is common for manicurists to talk to each other in Korean when they are working, often to the irritation and discomfort of customers. Customers can feel that they are being slighted and excluded by workers when they do not speak English, or that it is improper to speak Korean when they are around Americans. Clients also tend to feel suspicious that they are being talked about or made fun of by workers. Customers often think of workers speaking Korean over English as a choice and a show of obstinance instead of something necessary for them to easily communicate.

Sometimes workers purposely do not learn English or let on that they can understand and speak it, despite the fact that they usually get better tips if they do. The reasons for this vary. Some workers find small talk burdensome, as they want to finish their jobs and move on to the next customer; carrying a conversation is hard when they struggle with English, and they are often already exhausted by their work. Others feel a sense of community when they speak Korean with each other. There are manicurists who will not learn English because they do not feel the need to change or cater to the desires of customers, and shifting the power dynamic between themselves and the client is a way to regain a sense of agency. Yet there are customers who come to nail salons not just to get their nails done, but to be pampered. They want an experience, and a part of that experience is feeling like workers care about their comfort, are interested in their lives, and are happy to do their nails. That is also why Korean salons started offering massages; they make the client feel special and it gives them an edge when competing with Chinese salons. Depending on the class level of the client, if they do not feel cared for it is usually reflected in the tip, whether or not they return to the shop, or in their preference for certain workers who do fulfill that emotional connection. If they are primarily going to Korean salons because they want to get their nails done for cheap, chances are they will continue to patronize the business.

== Workplace inequalities ==
=== Income and wage theft ===
It is common for nail salon workers to be misclassified by their employers as independent contractors, instead of employees. When a worker is classified as an independent contractor they are not covered by labor laws relating to overtime, breaks, minimum wage requirements, sick time, paid vacation, Social Security, harassment, or discrimination.

There are varying reports on how much money workers make in Korean nail salons, though it is typically around $30.00 to $80.00 a day; they often work for ten hours a day, and almost every day of the week. Sometimes newcomers only earn $10.00 depending on their employer. When asked about wage theft and underpayment by Sarah Nir, theTimes reporter who wrote the industry-changing exposé, Sangho Lee, the then president of the Korean American Nail Salon Association, refused to comment. He believed that to answer any questions would negatively impact Korean Nail Salons, because of how many owners did not pay minimum wage. Korean nail salon owners subsequently denied that they were stealing money from their employees.

In June 2018 nail salon workers came together to speak at a New York State government hearing to advocate for the elimination of tipped wages, or sub-minimum wage. Workers argued that having their wages determined by the fact that they may get tips causes instability of income and a dependency on the generosity of customers. The prevalence of Korean nail salons in New York came partially from the fact that these salons offered cheaper options for manicures and pedicures, which opened up the industry to customers across the economic spectrum. Yet, the cheaper the prices posted by the salon, the less tip money the workers will receive. The director of the Korean Nail Salon Association, Donald Yu commented on this issue by saying that most workers make more money with the tipped wages than they would without them. An increase in wages, he argued, would cause an increase in prices, which would make customers not want to leave tips at all. He also mentioned that owners are struggling to survive with increasing prices in rent, tools, and with the pressure of competition, salons may have to close which will result in job loss for workers.

Additionally, according to the 2018 UCLA Labor Center Study, an estimated 78% of nail salon employees are considered low-wage workers. The industry sector has immigrants or refugee women. A lot of nail salons are "mom-and-pop" structures with few employees.

Another way that immigrant women in nail salons bring in money is by participate in rotating credit associations, or kyes. RCAs are specific to the nail salon workers who are Korean. These workers create and maintain kyes for a number of reasons, but the biggest incentive to join is the sense of community, support, and trust established amongst co-ethnic women workers. Immigrating to the U.S. can be incredibly difficult, and being a part of a RCA helps these nail salon workers feel connected to home and more grounded in the U.S. There is, of course financial incentive to joining. The money members receive go into a number of things: college tuition for their children, capital for their own nail salons, rent, vacations, or savings in case of emergencies. It is also a way for undocumented immigrants to use a more informal system of saving, as creating financial accounts through official institutions is difficult.

=== Exposure to harmful chemicals ===
Nail salon workers are frequently subjected to harmful chemicals found in nail products, including dibutyl phthalate (DBP), toluene, and formaldehyde—commonly referred to as the "toxic trio." Dibutyl phthalate can have an adverse effect on reproduction and development, formaldehyde is a carcinogen, and toluene can negatively affect both the nervous and reproductive systems. Although there is inconclusive research on the effects of long term exposure to these toxicants and irritants, many workers in nail salons report having similar health complications, such as asthma, fungal infections, nose bleeds, burning eyes, skin discoloration, coughing, nausea, musculoskeletal pain, and cancer. Miscarriages are a common occurrence among these workers, as well as stillbirths and developmental delays in children carried to term. These prevalent reproductive health concerns highlight the shortcomings of the overall health infrastructure in the United States nail salon industry.

==== Health complications ====
Historically, the nail salon industry has face criticism for hazardous workplace chemical exposures and insufficient health and safety regulations. Long-term exposure to harmful chemicals, commonly known as the "toxic trio," toluene, formaldehyde, and dibutyl phthalate, has sparked concerns about increased health risks, including reproductive and cognitive harm, allergies, cancer, and adverse reactions in the respiratory, skin, and nervous systems. Advocacy groups like the California Healthy Nail Salon Collaborative (CHNSC) have pushed for stronger regulations surrounding worker health and safety, urging for better ventilation, increased routine inspections, and protective equipment.

Current gaps in regulatory oversight stem from a lack of comprehensive intervention and enforcement mechanisms, placing the responsibility for product safety directly on cosmetic manufacturers and government agencies such as the Food and Drug Administration (FDA). The Federal Food, Drug, and Cosmetic Act bypasses FDA approval regarding cosmetic products and ingredients before they are marketed. Unlike the stricter regulations placed on drugs, biopharmaceuticals, and medical devices, the FDA lacks the authority to regulate ingredient formulations and cosmetically labeled products. It is legal for cosmetic companies to use these chemicals. While the FDA does regulate cosmetic ingredients, it does not have the authority to recall products without having to face litigation, to require that companies test the safety of ingredients before they go on the market, to do their own review of products before they are released, nor can they force companies to provide them with the results or conclusions reached through in-house studies of the health effects of certain products. Deemed safe under customary conditions, not misbranded or contaminated, cosmetic products are free to enter the market without undergoing prior FDA testing protocol. This leaves the responsibility for the safety of nail products entirely up to the cosmetics industry, contributing to exacerbating health risks for workers in the nail salon industry. Due to the FDA’s limited authority in the beauty industry, advocacy groups like CHNSC have emerged to support independent contractors, pushing for health reforms and greater safety measures in a sector that is often unregulated.

This allows products with the "toxic trio," or other dangerous ingredients, to be released as long as companies and manufacturers report that the product is safe if used as directed (painting nails with the polish instead of ingesting it). Not taken into account by the FDA's mandate, which was written into law around eighty years ago, is the long term effects of being exposed to these chemicals, what it does to the body to being around a mixture of these chemicals every day for hours at a time, or the multiple ways for these chemicals to enter the system, including inhalation and skin absorption. It is also legal for these companies to not label the ingredients on the product package when selling to salons, though when the product is sold in a retail store the ingredients must be listed. This, combined with low English proficiency, leaves workers without the ability to know what is in the products they are using.

Despite releasing a guide for nail salon workers to stay safe, OSHA has not updated its policies surrounding chemical exposure for workers since the 1970s. Specifically, they have not updated their Permissible Exposure Limits, despite acknowledging that they are out of date and not comprehensive enough. PELs determine the safe and legal amount of time a worker can be around chemicals, as well as the extent of the exposure level. Like the FDA, OSHA has not made policy changes that take into account the long term effects of being exposed to multiple chemicals for long periods of time, as well the lack of proper ventilation in some shops, which serves to make the exposure to these ingredients worse. PELs also do not take into account the age and gender of workers, which may influence what constitutes safe versus unsafe.

It is not a choice for many workers to leave the nail salon business to improve their health. Being an immigrant woman who speaks little English impacts their ability to find other work. It is also difficult for them to receive medical treatment if their doctor does not speak their language, or if they are uninsured and undocumented.

While the EU has banned more than 1,300 chemicals from being used in cosmetics, the U.S. has banned less than twelve, and despite there being around 10,000 chemicals in nail products, only eleven percent of those have been tested for safety by an independent agency.

== Advocacy initiatives ==
Several advocacy groups have emerged in response to critical issues in the nail salon sector, including labor rights, health and safety concerns, and economic disparities faced by its workers. Notable, active organizations include the California Healthy Nail Salon Collaborative (CHNSC), New York Healthy Nail Salon Coalition (NYHNSC), the Safe Nail Salon Project, and the National Healthy Nail Salon Alliance. It is composed of former nail salon workers, owners, and health researchers, and many members bring first-hand experience working in U.S. nail salons.

These organizations call for stricter government regulation of chemicals and product ingredients, proper education for workers on chemical safety and proper handling, increased distribution of translated materials, and the provisioning of masks, gloves, and proper ventilation. Through partnerships with academic institutions like UCLA's Labor Center, along with government agencies like the California Office of the Environmental Health Hazard Assessment (OEHHA) and the Occupational Safety and Health Administration (OSHA), these advocacy groups provide data-driven insights, identifying outreach and intervention strategies through pilot interventions, consumer and worker feedback, and trend analyses in regulatory oversight.

Advocacy groups work to address the evasive practice of labeling nail salon workers as independent contractors rather than employees. Since the Occupational Safety and Health Act fails to account for self-contractors, most salon owners are motivated to classify nail technicians as independent contractors. Bypassing employee benefits such as minimum wage, various compensations, and overtime pay, this classification leaves nail salon workers increasingly susceptible to exploitation. Advocacy groups often promote collective bargaining as a strategy to empower workers and advance labor rights in the service industry. Unlike pay structures commonly found in other service-based industries, Vietnamese nail salons often implement an chia (split profit system, typically in a 60-40 ratio). While this arrangement may provide nail technicians with some autonomy and flexibility, it often leaves workers without access to employee benefits like minimum wage and various compensations, increasing their financial vulnerability. The primary stakeholders in the nail salon industry include salon owners, workers, and advocacy groups, who address issues related to labor rights, workplace safety, and economic inequalities. These community-based initiatives push for reforms, providing nail technicians with the fundamental resources, agency, and autonomy to advocate for themselves.

== Aftermath of the New York Times exposé ==
The majority of change in the nail salon industry has been in New York, largely because the Times article focused on corruption in New York.

The Times article was released in May 2015, and within a few days Cuomo issued emergency orders to fight against wage theft and hazardous working conditions. He created the New York State Nail Industry Enforcement Task Force to investigate New York's nail salons and enforce new rules and regulations that would protect workers. Cuomo ordered that all nail salons post wage bonds, which work as a kind of insurance for workers that guarantees that they will get paid for their work, even if the salon closes. If salons do not comply with the order they will be shut down. Cuomo also order that employers post a workers' bill of rights inside the salon, written in multiple languages, including Korean. The Bill of Rights for Nail Workers includes information on how much money workers should make depending on the location of the salon and if they do or do not receive tips. It also informs workers that their employers must provide them with gloves, respirators for when they are working with artificial nails, as well as eye protection when they are handling chemicals. The employees are also informed that they cannot be denied a meal break, denied safety gear, or made to pay for their entry into their jobs. A hotline was also created for workers to report violations and abuse.

The Korean Nail Salon Association of New York sued Cuomo over these new regulations and laws, specifically those that had to do with wage bonds, arguing that because the majority of nail salon owners were Asian, they were being unfairly targeted and that it constituted discrimination. They also felt discriminated against specifically as nail salon owners, and that other beauty industries were not being made to make the same changes. This led to owners raising their prices, and responding that this would hurt not only their business but the jobs of the workers because they may not be able to afford to keep them hired. They also argued that they were not given enough time to purchase the bonds. By December 2015 the lawsuit had been thrown out. In 2016 Cuomo instituted new rules surrounding the implementation of ventilation in salons that sought to expel air contaminates from the salon to outdoors. While the Korean Nail Salon Association of New York warned against it, a number of Korean nail salon owners decided to sue Cuomo over the new rules, citing that the new ventilation system was too expensive, and that research had not properly proven that the fumes and chemicals from nail products were toxic. The suit was thrown out in 2017.

Within a year of its creation the task force found over 600 wage violations in 143 salons; as a result these salons were ordered to pay two million dollars to 652 employees in unpaid wages.
