= Tony Lam =

American politician (born 1936)

Member of the Westminster City Council
- In office 1992–2002

Personal details
- Born: October 4, 1936 (age 89) Haiphong, French Indochina
- Party: Republican
- Spouse: Hop Lam
- Children: 6
- Occupation: Politician

Tony Lam (born October 4, 1936) is a Vietnamese American politician. He served three terms as a member of the Westminster, California City Council from 1992 to 2002. Lam was the first Vietnamese American to be elected to political office in the United States.

Born and raised in Northern Vietnam, he later moved to South Vietnam after 1954 before ultimately settling in Little Saigon, Orange County after the fall of Saigon. An owner of three restaurants, including Viễn Đông, Lam served as a local community leader before later being elected to city council.

== Biography ==
=== Early life ===
Lam was born on October 4, 1936 in Haiphong, Northern Vietnam. After Vietnam was partitioned in 1954, Lam moved to South Vietnam. He learned English while serving in the Vietnamese navy. Lam worked for the USAID, and later worked as an industrialist, owning construction and processing plants. At the age of 28, with his older sibling, Dean, Lam managed Lam Brothers Corp, an independent contractor for the military at Cam Ranh Bay.

=== Emigration to the United States ===
Shortly before the fall of Saigon, Lam spent three months in Guam with his wife and six children, before later being transferred to Camp Pendleton. After initially being resettled in Florida, Lam later moved to Huntington Beach, California. In the US, Lam initially worked as a service station attendant for ten days, before becoming a supervisor for a shipping company, insurance salesman, immigration consultant, and an advertising executive. Lam and his family purchased their first home in Westminster in 1978. In 1982, Lam became a US citizen.

Lam established a life insurance agency and an business importing and exporting goods. In 1984, he opened Viễn Đông, a Vietnamese restaurant in Garden Grove, which was later sold and closed in 2016. By 1992, he owned three Vietnamese restaurants in Little Saigon, Orange County.

== Politics ==
In 1982, Lam helped start the Tet Festival in Westminster, California. In 1985, Lam organized a fundraiser for the 1985 Mexico City earthquake. A community leader, he was one of the founders of the Vietnamese American Chamber of Commerce (VACOC) and the Vietnamese American Lions Club in Westminster. As a law and order conservative, Lam later joined the Republican Party. As of 2002, he served as a trustee of the Orange County Community Council and Humana Hospital and was the president of the Orange County VACOC.

In 1989, Lam was appointed to serve on the city of Westminster's traffic commission.

=== Westminster City Council ===
In 1989, Lam worked with others to host a parade dedicated to honoring the South Vietnamese Armed Forces. Westminster City Council member Frank Fry responded, "If you want to be South Vietnamese, go back to South Vietnam." Insulted, Lam ran for city council in response.

In 1992, Lam was elected to Westminster City Council with the motto "Tax Fighter, Crime Fighter", becoming the first Vietnamese American to be elected to political office. He has been praised for uniting Westminster's Vietnamese population with its other groups. He has also been credited with assisting in persuading the state of California in placing Little Saigon freeway signs. Lam helped Vietnamese Americans become registered voters and for their children to be registered for schools. He also found black antique French streetlights to line the streets of Little Saigon, Orange County, similar to South Vietnam.

Lam ran for office again in 1994 and 1998, ultimately serving a total of three terms over the span of ten years.

In January 1999, the Hi-Tek incident occurred; Truong Van Tran placed the communist flag and a photo of Ho Chi Minh in his video store, leading to community protests. Westminster officials and the city attorney told him to avoid participating in the protests since neutrality was required to avoid legal action. As a result, his restaurant was picketed for 73 days.

On August 8, 2002, Lam announced his retirement from politics and that he will not seek a fourth term.

== Personal life ==
In 1960 or 1961, Lam married his wife, Hop Lam. As of 2002, they had six children and nine grandchildren.

== Legacy ==
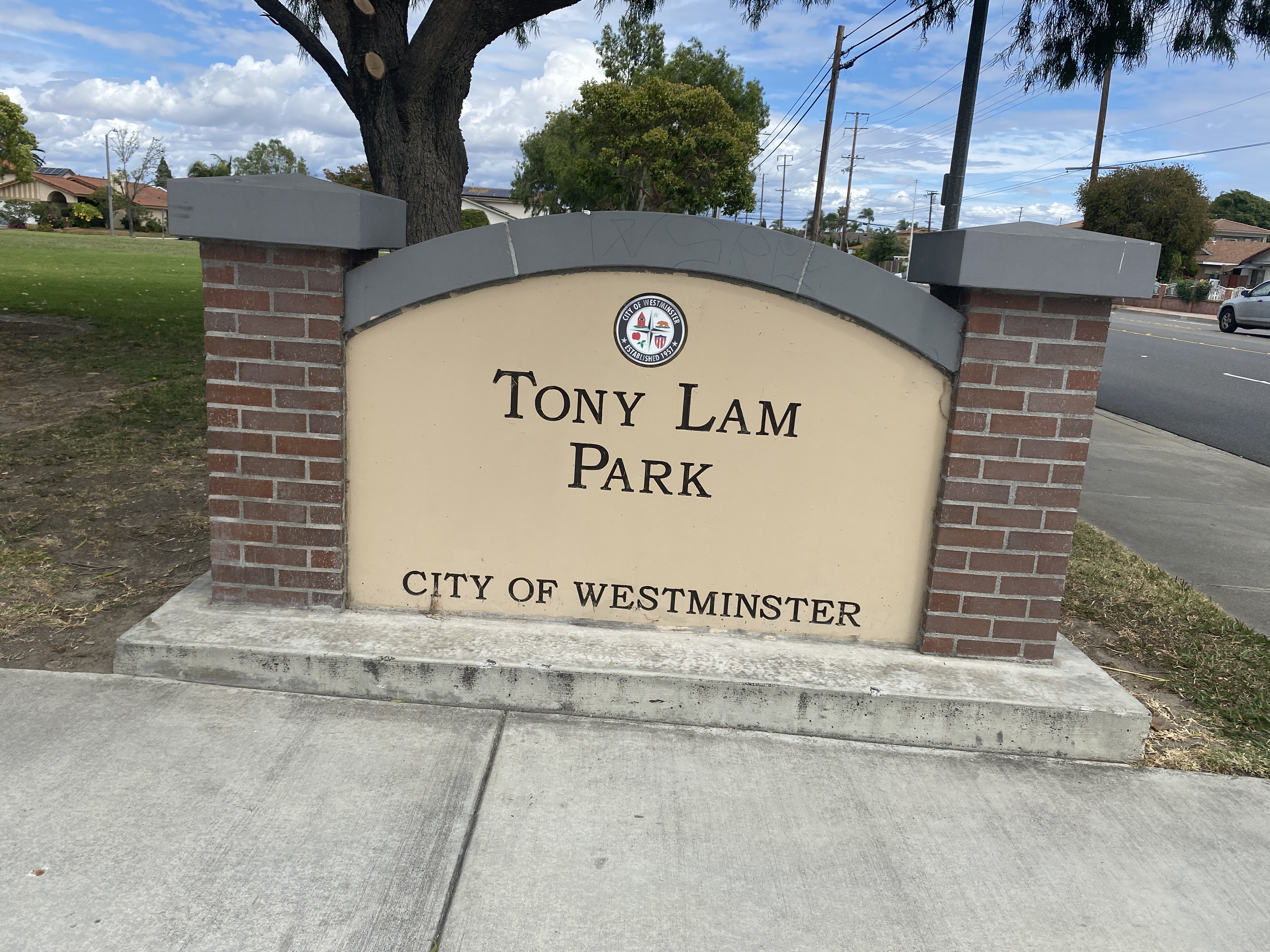
Entrance sign to Tony Lam Park

In 2022, Park West Park in Westminster was renamed to Tony Lam Park.

== Electoral history ==
1992 Westminster, California city council election
| Candidate | Votes | % |
|---|---|---|
| Tony Lam | 6,687 | 30.8 |
| Margie L. Rice | 6,644 | 30.6 |
| Loretta A. Walker | 4,602 | 21.2 |
| Helena Rutkowski | 1,681 | 7.7 |
| Jimmy Tong Nguyen | 1,393 | 6.4 |
| Norman S. Lawson | 733 | 3.4 |
| Total votes | 21,740 | 100.0 |

1994 Westminster, California city council recall election
| Choice | Votes | % |
|---|---|---|
| For | 4,340 | 34.78 |
| Against | 8,137 | 65.22 |
| Total | 12,477 | 100.00 |
Source: Los Angeles Times

1994 Westminster, California city council election
| Candidate | Votes | % |
|---|---|---|
| Margie L. Rice | 9,974 | 36.1 |
| Tony Lam | 8,984 | 32.5 |
| Craig Schweisinger | 8,703 | 31.4 |
| Total votes | 27,661 | 100.0 |

1998 Westminster, California city council election
| Candidate | Votes | % |
|---|---|---|
| Margie L. Rice | 6,943 | 22.0 |
| Tony Lam | 5,978 | 19.0 |
| Kermit Marsh | 5,481 | 17.4 |
| Helena Rutkowski | 3,608 | 11.4 |
| Robert Crossley | 3,518 | 11.2 |
| Duoc Tan Nguyen | 2,602 | 8.3 |
| Garth Murrin | 1,862 | 5.9 |
| Dancharles Maka'ena | 1,538 | 4.9 |
| Total votes | 31,530 | 100.0 |

== See also ==
- Joseph Cao, first Vietnamese American to serve in Congress
- Jacqueline Nguyen, first Vietnamese American federal judge
