= BusJunction =

American ticketing website

BusJunction.com
- Company type: Private
- Website type: Travel search engine/Fare aggregator
- Founded: 2009
- Headquarters: Washington, D.C., {{{location_country}}}
- Founder: Matthew Keller
- Industry: Travel, internet
- Products: BusJunction.com
- Employees: 5 (2009)
- Website: www.busjunction.com

BusJunction.com was a discount bus ticket search engine based in the United States. It aggregated ticket information from discount and Chinatown bus lines so that users could search for tickets by price and departure time.

== History ==
The company was established in April 2009 by Matthew Keller. It was headquartered in Washington, D.C.

The site was one of many to take advantage of the recent boom in intercity bus transit in the East and Midwest United States. According to a DePaul University study, scheduled intercity bus departures grew 9.8% between 2007 and 2008, marking the second consecutive year of robust growth. With this growth came the introduction of several premium-grade bus lines serving routes along the East Coast, such as Megabus, BoltBus, and Vamoose Bus. BusJunction was the first search engine to include these bus lines in its search results.

BusJunction did not sell tickets directly to the consumer; rather, it redirected visitors to the appropriate bus line website in order to make their purchase.

== Awards ==
In July 2009, the site was named Best New Travel Website of 2009 by Washingtonian Magazine.
