= Eastern Shuttle =

Eastern Shuttle may refer to the following in the United States:

- Eastern Air Lines Shuttle, a former air shuttle service on the East Coast of the United States
- Eastern Shuttle (bus company), a bus operator between New York City and Richmond, Virginia
