= Fung Wah Bus Transportation =

American commercial intercity bus service

Fung Wah Bus Transportation, Inc.
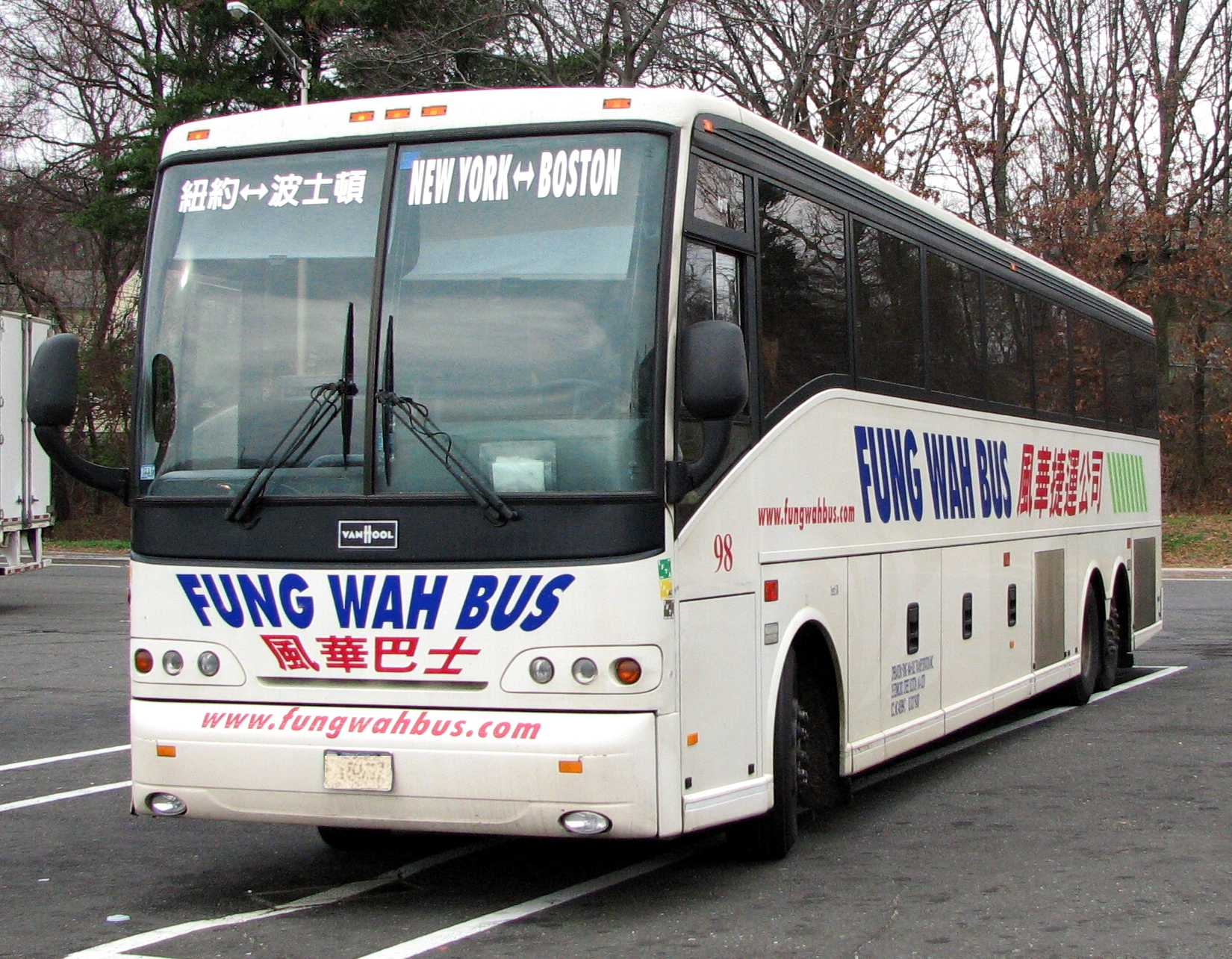
- Fung Wah Bus Van Hool C2045 #98 makes a stop in eastern Connecticut along its route
- Founded: 1996
- Defunct: 2015
- Headquarters: 25 Edinboro Street, Boston, Massachusetts 02111
- Locale: Northeastern United States
- Service area: New York City and Boston
- Service type: Line-run service
- Routes: 1
- Stations: 2
- Fleet: 28
- Chief executive: Pei Lin Liang
- Website: fungwahbus.com

Chinese name
- Traditional Chinese: 風華巴士有限公司
- Simplified Chinese: 风华巴士有限公司
Transcriptions
Standard Mandarin
- Hanyu Pinyin: fēnghuá bāshì yǒuxiàn gōngsī
Yue: Cantonese
- Jyutping: fung^{1}waa^{4} baa^{1}si^{6-2} jau^{5}haan^{6} gung^{1}si^{1}

Fung Wah Bus Transportation Inc. (Chinese: 風華巴士有限公司; Jyutping: fung1 waa4 baa1 si2 jau5 haan6 gung1 si1) was one of the first Chinatown bus lines in the U.S., running bus service between Boston and New York City. It operated from 1996 to 2015, except for a brief period in 2014 when it was shut down for safety violations.

== Etymology ==
The name Fung Wah came from the Cantonese pronunciation of the Chinese term 風華, which means "elegance". The Chinese characters of the company's name were written in English as Fenghua Jieyun Gongsi and translated as Elegant Rapid Transit Company. Translations of "Fung Wah" from Cantonese included Chinese Wind.

== Route ==
Fung Wah used a fleet of over two dozen buses to operate hourly scheduled service between designated curbside locations only at South Station in Boston and in Chinatown in Manhattan. It usually traveled over Interstate 95 on its route.

== History ==
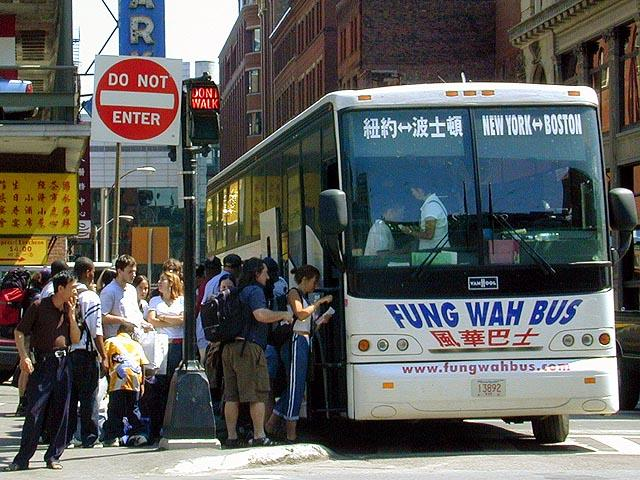
Bus boarding in Boston

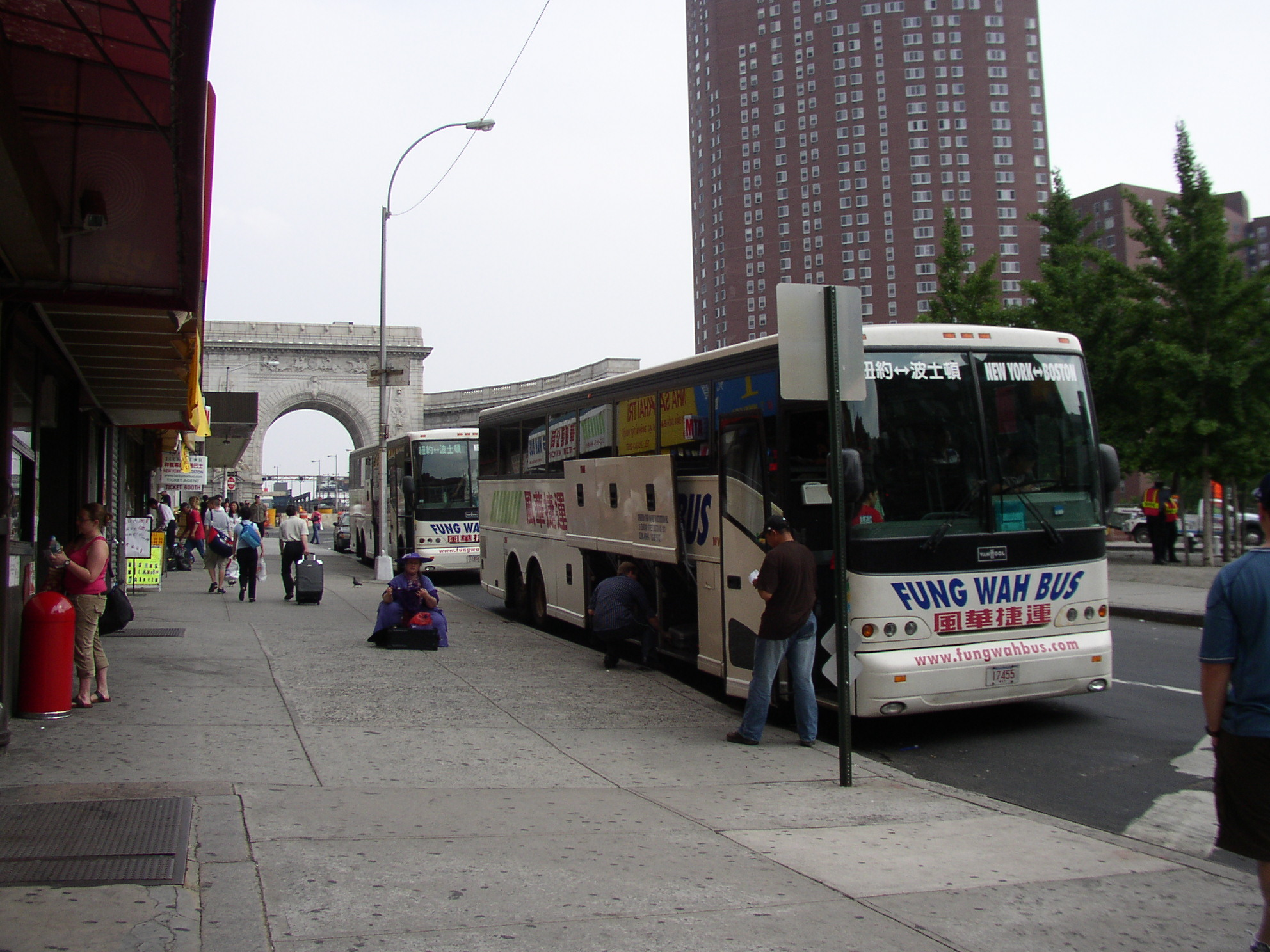
Fung Wah Chinatown Bus awaiting departure at the Canal St. stop in Manhattan, New York City, in 2007

Fung Wah was founded in New York City in 1996, as Fung Wah Transport Vans, Inc., by Pei Lin Liang, who had immigrated from Zhuhai, China in 1988. Before founding the company, Liang had worked as a driver for Four Seas, a local dollar van service that shuttled Chinese garment and restaurant workers from Sunset Park in Brooklyn to Chinatown in Manhattan. Fung Wah began as a direct competitor with Liang's former employer.

In 1997, Liang borrowed $60,000 and bought four vans at the request of customers who wanted to visit their children in college in Boston. With fares lower than other bus and rail carriers between New York City and Boston, Fung Wah became popular with young people and other travelers on a budget, and it gradually grew to being a low cost intercity transit provider. As one of the first of the Chinatown bus lines, Fung Wah and competitors like Lucky Star Bus were competing fiercely by 2003, with prices as low as $10 and allegations of crime connections at other competitors. While it originally operated curbside out of Boston's Chinatown, Fung Wah moved to the nearby Boston South Station bus terminal in 2004 due to traffic concerns from Boston city government. Between 1997 and 2007, Chinatown buses like Fung Wah took 60% of Greyhound Lines' market share in the northeast United States.

On June 15, 2009, Fung Wah expanded service to Rhode Island at the Kennedy Plaza bus terminal in downtown Providence, but discontinued this route in 2010.

In February 2013, an investigative report broadcast on WBZ-TV Boston found cracked frames on Fung Wah buses. In early 2013, Massachusetts authorities then ordered most of the Fung Wah fleet off the road. In March 2013, the Federal Motor Carrier Safety Administration declared Fung Wah an "imminent hazard to public safety" and ordered it to cease all operations with its then-current fleet. On March 28, 2013, the US Department of Transportation ordered the company to immediately suspend all service. In September 2013, it was reported that both Fung Wah and Lucky Star lines (another "Chinatown bus" line) had done extensive work, training, and purchases hoping to get their bus lines operating again. There was to be a re-filing for their operating licenses and possible limited resumption of service in Fall 2013.

On February 7, 2014, the Federal Motor Carrier Safety Administration denied Fung Wah's request to resume operations, claiming the company "was not willing nor able to comply" with federal intercity bus safety standards. Fung Wah's law firm, the New York firm Freeman Lewis LLC, appealed the decision.

On December 18, 2014, it was announced that the bus line would resume service in early 2015. Fung Wah spent hundreds of thousands of dollars to improve the safety of its buses between February 2013 and December 2014; in addition, it was revealed that inspections of the buses were flawed. The Federal Motor Carrier Safety Administration would monitor Fung Wah closely after operations resumed.

However, in July 2015, before resumption of service was slated to start, owner Peter Liang announced that the service would end permanently. The line reportedly shut down because it could not find a bus stop in Boston's South Station. Alternatives, such as Alewife station at the northern terminus of the Red Line subway in Cambridge, were reportedly given as an option but deemed too far away from its traditional operating location near Chinatown in Boston.

== Safety-related incidents ==
The Fung Wah Bus crash in Chinatown, Manhattan, on June 23, 2008

Fung Wah buses have been involved in several safety-related incidents. In 2005, the company was given a federal driver risk rating of 73 out of 100, where 100 is the worst and 75 at risk of being unsafe and subject to crashes. Ian Grossman of the Federal Motor Carrier Safety Administration reported that Fung Wah drivers rated among the worst two percent of drivers nationwide based on regulatory violations, and nine out of 71 Fung Wah drivers were suspended after inspection between 2004 and 2006. Still, many travelers were not discouraged.

- August 16, 2005: A New York bound bus caught fire on Interstate 91 near Meriden, Connecticut. Though the passengers later criticized the driver for being unhelpful and untrained in evacuating the bus, all passengers were eventually evacuated and no injuries were reported.
- September 6, 2006: A bus rolled over in Auburn, Massachusetts and caused minor injuries to 34 passengers. Excessive speed was cited as a factor and the bus company was fined.
- January 3, 2007: In Framingham, Massachusetts, a New York-bound bus lost two of its rear wheels. No injuries were reported.
- February 14, 2007: The driver of a New York-bound bus lost control in a winter storm and hit a guardrail on the Massachusetts Turnpike (I-90) in Allston, Massachusetts. No injuries were reported.
- March 23, 2007: A New York-bound bus got stuck on a concrete barrier in front of a tollbooth on the Massachusetts Turnpike at Route 128 in Weston, Massachusetts, when the bus drove up on a cement lane divider. The driver had entered an automobile-only lane and tried to change lanes. No one was injured in the incident, but the bus was taken out of service and passengers boarded another Fung Wah bus that arrived later.
- June 23, 2008: A bus loading passengers was struck by an out of control dump truck at the corner of Bowery and Canal Street in New York's Chinatown. The force of the impact pushed the bus onto the sidewalk and into a bank. As the result of the crash, a sign attached to a light pole fell, injuring a 57-year-old woman; the woman later died from a heart attack. Several people, including two police officers, were treated for minor injuries. State Department of Transportation inspectors found the dump truck, owned by CPQ Freight Systems, had eight mechanical issues, including faulty brakes, which led to the crash.
- There were no crash incidents involving Fung Wah reported to the Federal Motor Carrier Safety Administration (United States Department of Transportation) by states for 24 months prior to December 26, 2011.
- February 25, 2013: The company pulled nearly its entire fleet off the road with 21 of 28 buses after inspectors from the Massachusetts Department of Public Utilities found multiple structural cracks in several buses. The company reduced their service from every half-hour to hourly, and used rental buses in place of the fleet.
- February 26, 2013: As a result of the structural damage discovered the day before, the Federal Motor Carrier Safety Administration (FMCSA) ordered Fung Wah to "immediately cease passenger service" indefinitely and to park its remaining seven buses.
- March 1, 2013: The FMCSA formally cancels the motor carrier docket (MC 405969, USDOT 954187) and operating authority of Fung Wah after Fung Wah blocked access to safety records. As such, Fung Wah cannot charter buses to meet service.

== 2004 discrimination lawsuit ==
In January 2004, due to the company's policy barring pets from buses, the Fung Wah Bus Company refused to sell tickets to a blind couple traveling with a guide dog, even when informed by the couple—and later by police responding to a disturbance call—that the couple had the right to board the bus with a service animal. In conjunction with the Massachusetts Attorney General, the couple later filed a discrimination lawsuit against the company, which the Attorney General's office allowed: "Massachusetts law prohibits discrimination against blind persons and requires businesses to allow service animals in their establishments even when there is an existing 'no pet' policy, as long as the animal is controlled and does not otherwise pose an undue burden." In July 2007, the Massachusetts Commission Against Discrimination awarded the couple $60,000 in damages, assessed a $10,000 civil penalty payable to the Commonwealth of Massachusetts and ordered the company to take several steps to prevent discrimination in the future.

== See also ==
- BoltBus - competing service, also stopping in Chinatown and near Penn Station
- Chinatown bus lines
- Chinatown Buses (Budget long distance coaches & buses) in List of bus operating companies
- Coach USA - operator of the Eastern Shuttle service
- Megabus - competing service
