= Xe Đò Hoàng =

Intercity bus service in Orange County, California

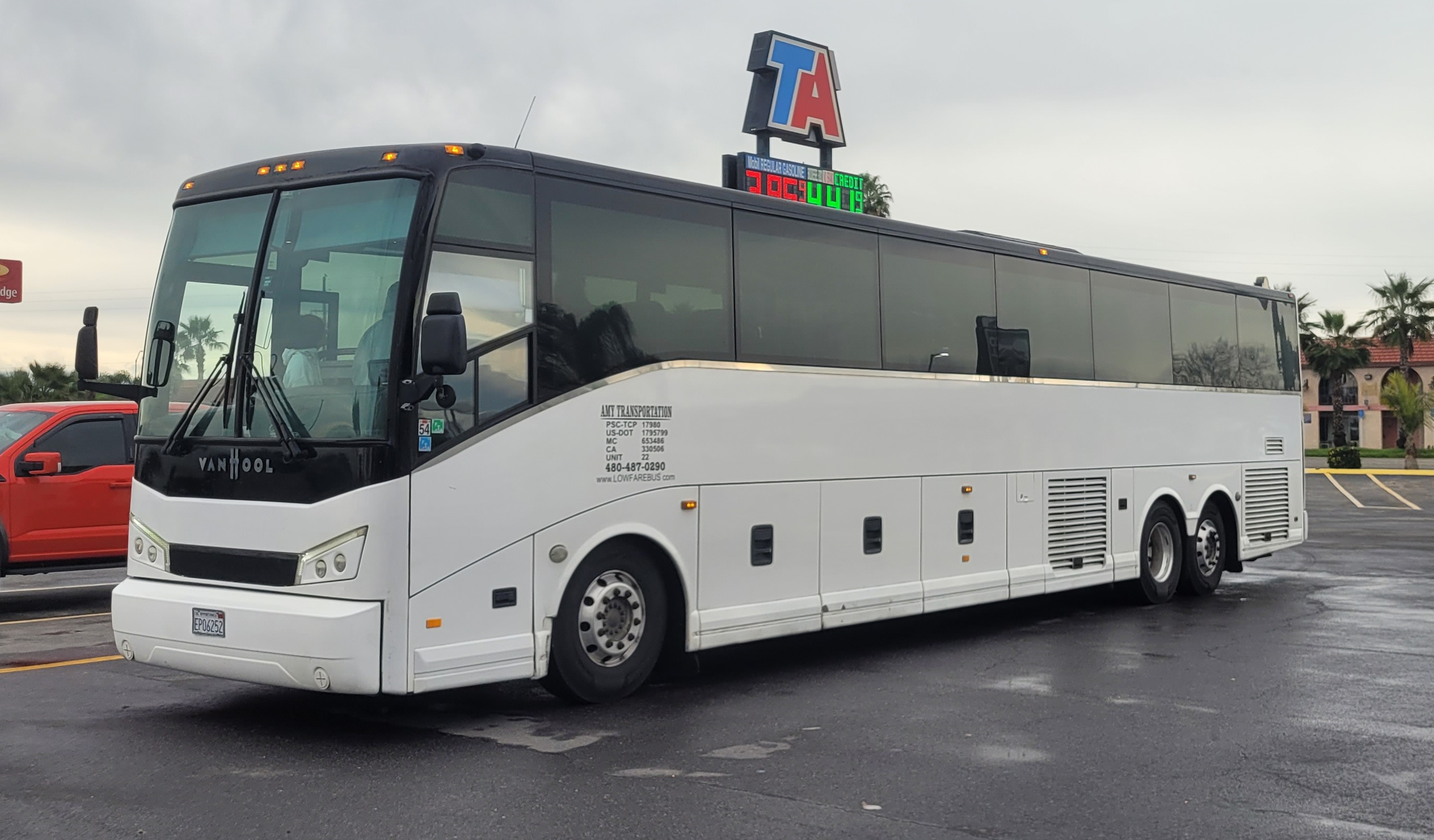
A Xe Đò Hoàng bus en route to Winchester, California

Xe Đò Hoàng (lit. 'Hoàng Bus') or Hoang Express is an intercity bus service based in Orange County, California. The service began in 1999 with a route connecting Little Saigon in Orange County with the community in San Jose. The service has grown to become a crucial link between Vietnamese-American communities in the West Coast.

== History ==
Xe Đò Hoàng was started by Linh Hoang Nguyen (Nguyễn Hoàng Linh) in 1999, with a few small vans. He got the idea of starting a bus line connecting Little Saigon in Orange County with San Jose, the two communities with the largest concentration of Vietnamese people in the United States, while waiting for a flight at John Wayne Airport. He was working as a driving instructor in Orange County at the time, and on his frequent flights to visit relatives in San Jose he often helped elderly Vietnamese Americans with limited English abilities to find their gates or the baggage carousel. In the beginning, there was only one line from Little Saigon to San Jose, using an old Chevrolet minivan; he later bought an old bus.

After the September 11 attacks, increased security at airports and increased fear of flying created opportunities for the service to expand. In 2001, the service had turned into a 57-seat bus and became well known in the Vietnamese American community in California. In 2005, Linh Hoang Nguyen was seriously injured after being shot; according to the police, his assailants were hired by a business competitor to assassinate him. Before that, employees of the service were attacked while picking up customers.

By 2014, the service had grown to include 11 buses with 15 drivers and expanded to various destinations such as Sacramento, Oakland, San Francisco, and Phoenix. The Orange County-San Jose route alone had about 1000 riders per week.

Xe Đò Hoàng was severely impacted during the COVID-19 pandemic. The service suffered low ridership after the stay-at-home order was lifted in California and had to reduce the frequency of its routes.

== Services ==
Xe Đò Hoàng has a relatively low cost and arrives at its destinations quicker compared to mainstream intercity bus lines such as Greyhound. Its riders are primarily Vietnamese Americans, although people of other ethnicities also ride the bus, prompted by word of mouth from friends due to its inexpensive cost. It targets primarily riders living in Northern or Southern California who want to visit family or friends in the other region, especially the elderly and college students, or those who don't want to drive the long distance or can not afford plane tickets.

When riding the bus, each passenger would be given a bánh mì or xôi, a water bottle, napkins, and a trash bag. The TV screens on the bus usually show Vietnamese-language variety shows produced in the United States such as Paris by Night or those produced by Asia Entertainment, or Vân Sơn Entertainment. There is free Wi-Fi on board for those needing Internet access. Besides transporting people, Xe Đò Hoàng also transports goods between its destinations.

Currently, Xe Đò Hoàng serves routes connecting Southern California with San Jose, Oakland, San Francisco, Sacramento, and Arizona; Northern California with Los Angeles, El Monte, Westminster, San Diego; and in Arizona connecting Chandler, Tempe, and Phoenix.

== Role ==
Xe Đò Hoàng is considered a connecting bridge between the two largest Vietnamese communities in the United States, even though they are separated by almost 400 miles. Riders use the service to visit family and friends, attend ceremonies, or keep in touch with their loved ones even though they live far away from each other. The service plays a role similar to that of Chinatown bus lines for Chinese Americans in the East Coast. Xe Đò Hoàng is also active in the Vietnamese-American community, having provided free or reduced-cost transportation to protesters protesting against the Vietnamese government or against the Chinese government in the Hai Yang Shi You 981 standoff.

== See also ==
- Chinatown bus lines
