= Chinatown bus lines =

American commercial intercity bus services

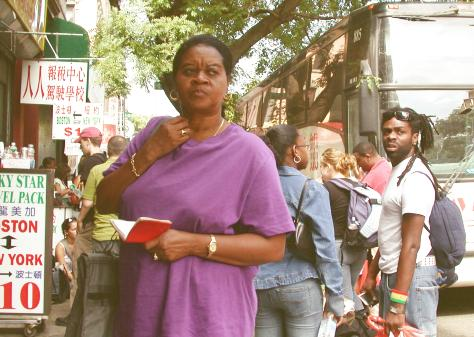
Passengers waiting to board a Travel Pack bus on Mulberry Street in Manhattan en route to Boston in 2004

2010 schematic map of four eastern U.S. Chinatown bus lines, with New York City as the hub

Chinatown bus lines are discount intercity bus services in the United States, often operated by Chinese Americans, primarily Min Chinese speakers from Fujian.

== History ==
=== Early history ===
Chinese-operated intercity bus service began when the Chinese working class and new immigrants, particularly Chinese restaurant workers who found jobs in other cities, needed to travel to and from New York City, Boston, and Atlantic City. The first companies to offer Chinese intercity bus service had no frills: unmarked curbside bus stops with no advertising or customer service; overhead costs were low. Chinatown bus lines began operations in 1997. In 1998, two companies began operations: Fung Wah Bus Transportation, between New York and Boston, and Eastern Bus, between New York and Philadelphia. At first, very few non-Chinese made use of the services; As word spread, the demographics of these bus lines became similar to those of other intercity bus lines.

Competition and price wars between newly successful companies, combined with online ticket sales, led to a reduction in fares. Service to smaller cities by Chinatown bus lines had less of a price advantage. The fierce competition led to gang violence in which rival bus operators killed or injured each other. Because of their low fares, Chinatown bus lines had very low profit margins; some went bankrupt and ceased operations. However, the services became more popular and the number of trips by Chinatown bus lines increased.

In 2004, a fully-booked bus net at least $340 profit per round trip after expenses. In 2004, Vamoose Bus was launched by Hasidic Jews to compete with Chinatown bus lines.

By 2005, Chinatown bus lines appropriated much of the market share of Greyhound Lines in the Northeastern United States.

By 2006, many Chinatown bus lines operated service to and from casinos popular with Chinese and Vietnamese immigrants, providing free-play vouchers to passengers, some of which were then resold to others.

In 2008, BoltBus was established by Greyhound to compete with the less-expensive Chinatown bus lines; it ceased operations in July 2021.

By 2010, service expanded to many major cities across the U.S.

By 2012, riders of Chinatown buses made up over half the ridership of northeastern intercity buses, bringing annual intercity ridership to over seven million passengers.

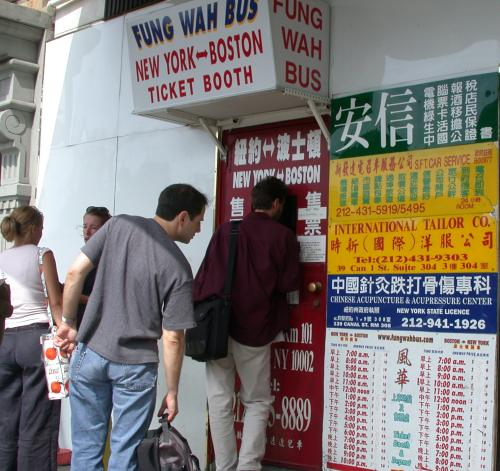
Passengers waiting at the now-defunct Fung Wah Bus Transportation ticket window on Canal Street at the Bowery in Manhattan's Chinatown

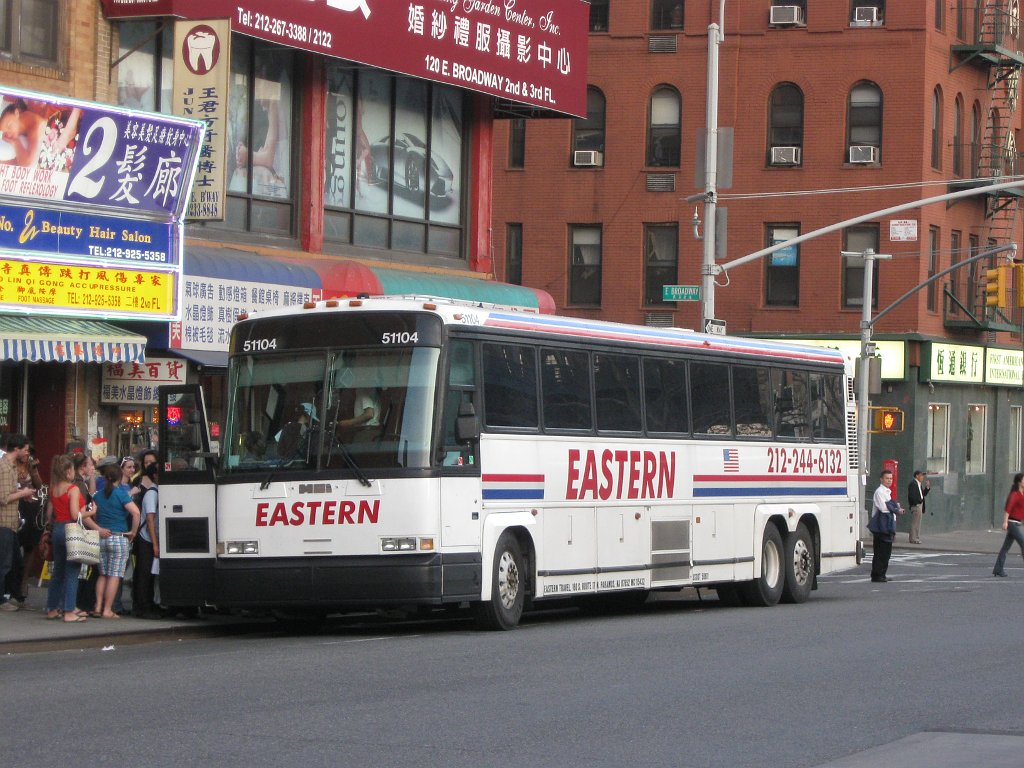
Eastern Bus MCI 102DL3 coach boarding passengers in Manhattan's Chinatown

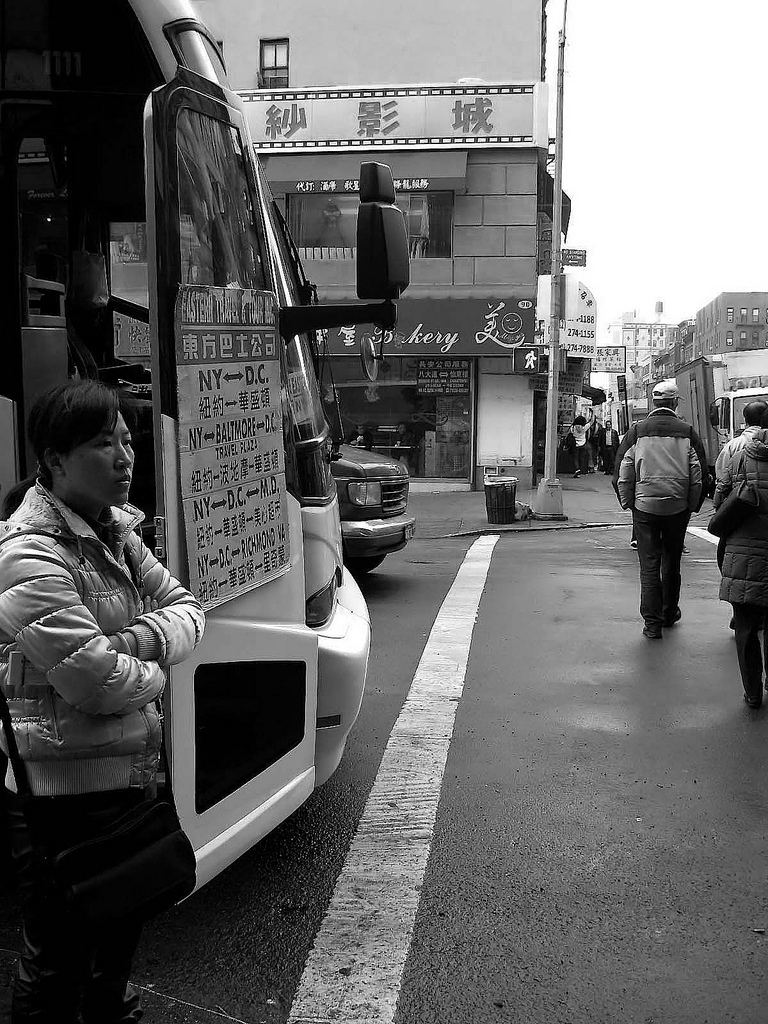
Bus-ticket saleswoman at the corner of East Broadway and Forsyth Street in the Little Fuzhou neighborhood of Manhattan's Chinatown

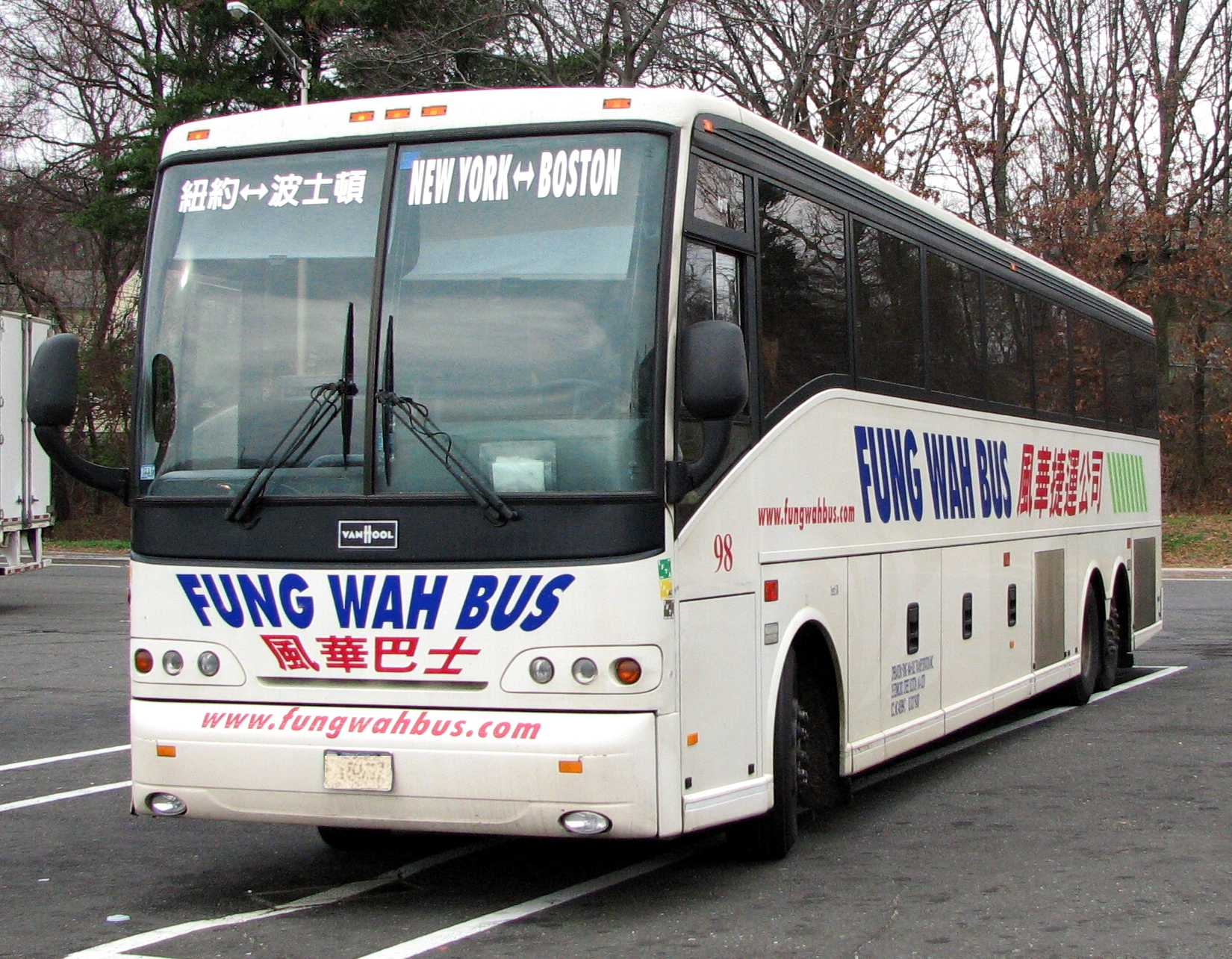
Fung Wah Bus Transportation Van Hool C2045 coach on a stopover

=== Complaints, shutdowns, and increased regulations ===
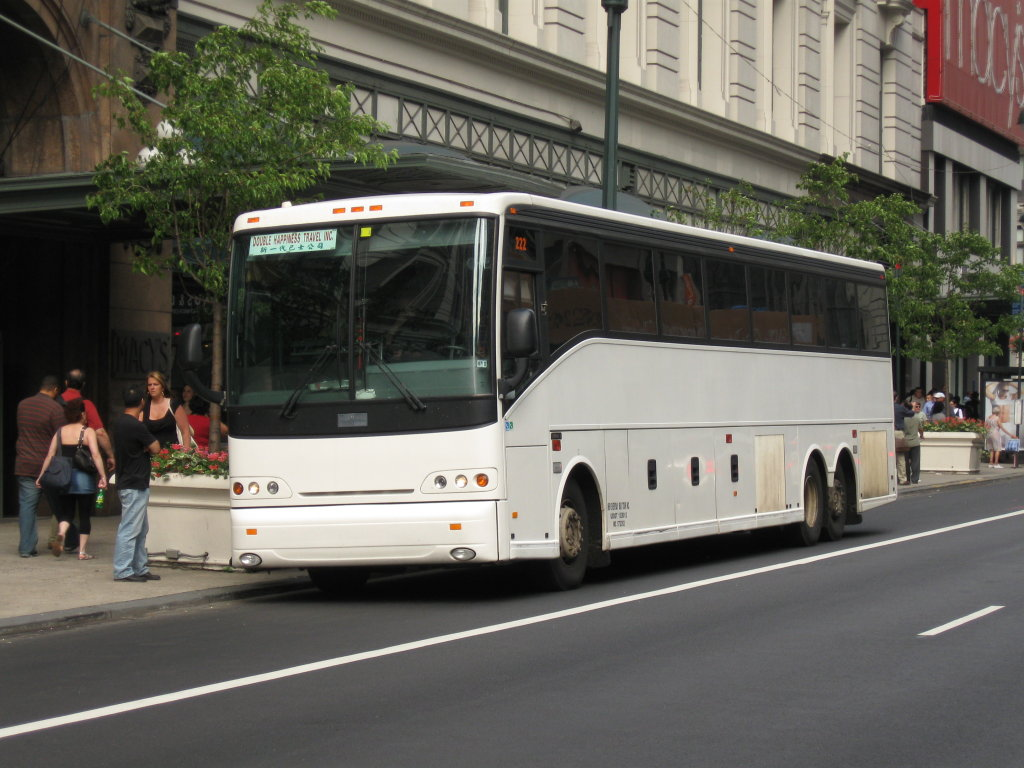
Double Happiness #222 at Herald Square

The curbside bus stops used by Chinatown bus lines led to many complaints from nearby residents and business owners due to noise, pollution, trash, blocked traffic, and sidewalk overcrowding. The complaints led to increased regulations in several cities, including permit requirements, bus stop requirements, fines and fees, as well as the construction of the Independence Transportation Center in Philadelphia. These regulations were also allegedly influenced by Peter Pan Bus Lines and Greyhound Lines, which compete with Chinatown bus lines.

Double Happyness Travel, Inc. was shut down in December 2011 after it was called "an imminent hazard" by transportation officials.

On May 31, 2012, the Federal Motor Carrier Safety Administration (FMCSA) announced the shutdown of Apex Bus, I-95 Coach, New Century Travel, and 23 related entities due to safety violations.

On March 2, 2013, the United States Department of Transportation shut down Fung Wah Bus Transportation because of its refusal to provide safety records. The company was later authorized to resume its bus operations but shut down anyways in 2015. In two years, it was cited for 159 maintenance violations, had nearly a dozen speeding tickets and was cited for employing drivers without commercial driver's licenses.

On May 25, 2013, a bus operated by Lucky Star was taken out of service when a manhole cover became lodged in its undercarriage. The company was shut down on June 5 due to "flagrant disregard for motor coach passenger safety". Lucky Star conducted an extensive bus upgrade and driver program, passed required inspections, and resumed operations in November 2013.

The shutdowns led to an increase in bus fares and some say the shutdowns were unnecessary. Jim Epstein, a writer for libertarian publication Reason, called the FMCSA practices overly harsh, writing that the agency targets Chinatown bus companies because owners are rarely fluent in English and alleging that inspectors were overly strict about defective components, confiscating several buses for minor issues.

Despite these shutdowns, in 2015, Chinatown bus lines operated 5.3 million passenger trips and 48.5 million annual miles of service, up 14% from 2013 and up 26% since 2008.

In May 2019, Eastern Bus, a Chinatown bus line, reached a deal with FlixBus, in which FlixBus handles all marketing and sales for the company.

=== Organized crime related incidents ===
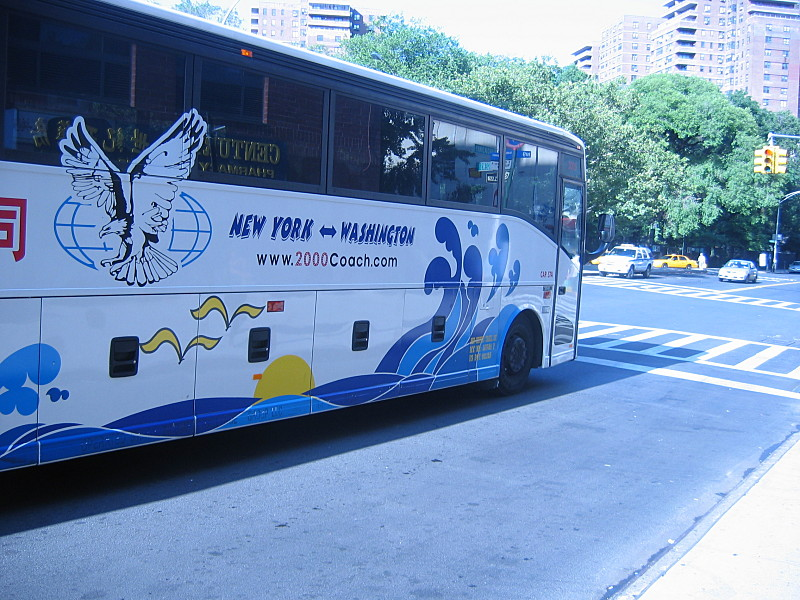
A 2000 Coach bus in New York City

In 2003 and 2004, bus burnings, driver assaults, murders, and other gang violence in New York City were linked to the possible infiltration of Asian organized crime gangs in the industry.

Among the crimes associated with gang activity was a deadly shooting in May 2003 on a busy street, which may have been in retaliation for a driver backing his bus into a rival; in revenge, two buses were set on fire the following year. Fatal stabbings occurred in October 2003 and in 2004. The boyfriend of a bus-company employee was fatally shot in an apparent bus feud in January 2004, and a Chinatown bus operator was shot to death two months later.

In February 2004, after several murders connected with employees of rival Chinatown bus companies, officials conducted a surprise inspection and seized buses.

In a June 2004 incident tied to criminal gangs, two people—a Chinatown bus driver and a bystander—were murdered in a bar in Flushing, Queens; another was shot in the leg. The accused shooter was arrested in Toronto in 2011, and was extradited to the United States. After the 2004 shootings, the New York City Police Department increased its enforcement of Chinatown-bus laws.

Bus-feud crime subsided by 2007.

In 2008, the Banya Organization, a Chinese gang, was accused of assaulting employees of Chinatown bus lines in an attempt to extort partial ownership and a share of the profits.

In 2013, police confiscated 254 guns and arrested 19 members of the largest gun-smuggling ring in New York City history; the suspects were accused of shipping guns via Chinatown bus lines. In 2020, Chinatown bus lines were again accused of being a conduit for gun trafficking.

== Safety records and incidents ==
In 2006, on a safety scale of 0 to 100, where 0 was the safest and 100 the most dangerous, Chinatown bus lines were rated between 71 and 99; Greyhound was rated 0. "Calculations of safety and risk are inverted," according to a 2013 City University of New York study.

A report in 2011 found that curbside Chinatown buses were often more dangerous than buses that stop in terminals.

However, as of 2011, many travelers were not discouraged from using the services.

In 2012, General Bus, a Chinatown bus line, had a safety record worse than 99.5% of other intercity bus lines.

In 2017, in safety rankings, three Chinatown bus lines were among the worst safety violators among U.S. intercity bus lines. Dahlia was ranked 83, Eastern Coach was ranked 77, and PandaNY was ranked 63.

=== List of safety incidents ===
- On February 8, 2003, at 11:43 a.m., a bus operated by Dahlia transporting passengers to the Trump Taj Mahal in Atlantic City, New Jersey, spun off the Garden State Parkway and flipped on its side on a snowy embankment, killing two people and injuring 28 people.
- On March 18, 2005, at around 2:00 a.m., a Boston-bound Chinatown bus operated by Lucky Star/Travel Pack stopped and evacuated its passengers on the Massachusetts Turnpike shortly before it burst into flames. No one was injured.
- On August 16, 2005, a New York-bound bus operated by Fung Wah Bus Transportation caught fire on Interstate 91 near Meriden, Connecticut. Although the passengers later criticized the driver for being unhelpful and untrained in evacuating the bus, no injuries were reported. After the August 2005 bus fire, the Massachusetts Department of Telecommunications and Energy began conducting three surprise inspections per month on all bus companies leaving Boston's South Station terminal. Senator Chuck Schumer of New York proposed a four-point federal plan which would includes surprise inspections and a national safety standard for bus operators.
- On August 15, 2006, just before 1:00 a.m., a driver of a Shun Fa bus traveling from New York to Pittsburgh lost control during a thunderstorm and the bus crashed into the highway meridian and went up an embankment. Ten passengers were injured, five of whom were hospitalized, one in critical condition.
- On September 6, 2006, at around 2:00 p.m., a bus operated by Fung Wah Bus Transportation rolled over in Auburn, Massachusetts, injuring 34 passengers. Excessive speed was cited as a factor and the bus company was fined.
- On January 3, 2007, a bus operated by Fung Wah Bus Transportation lost its back two wheels in Framingham, Massachusetts, early in a trip to New York. No injuries were reported.
- On February 14, 2007, a bus operated by Fung Wah Bus Transportation en route to New York went out of control and struck a traffic barrier on the Massachusetts Turnpike, I-90, in Allston. No injuries were reported. State officials had advised Fung Wah Bus Transportation to suspend operations because of a winter storm that day. Fung Wah reached an agreement with regulators in which its buses would be subject to inspections and driver checks for 30 days. The company agreed to improve safety, including removing unclean, unsafe buses from service.
- On February 18, 2007, just before 7:30 p.m., a bus owned by Tremblay Motorcoach and operated by Sunshine Travel caught fire on the Massachusetts Turnpike near interchange 10A in Millbury, Massachusetts. All 50 passengers were evacuated, and no injuries were reported. The cause of the fire was unknown. The bus was returning to Chinatown, Boston from the Mohegan Sun casino in Uncasville, Connecticut.
- On March 23, 2007, a New York-bound bus operated by Fung Wah Bus Transportation from Boston got stuck on a cement lane divider at a tollbooth on the Massachusetts Turnpike at Massachusetts Route 128 in Weston, Massachusetts, when the driver tried to change lanes. No one was injured, and passengers boarded a later bus.
- On May 20, 2007, at around 3:30 a.m., a New York-bound bus veered off a highway six miles west of Clearfield, Pennsylvania, killing 2 riders and injuring 32 more.
  June 23, 2008 Fung Wah Bus Transportation bus crash
- On June 23, 2008, a bus loading passengers was struck by an out-of-control dump truck at the intersection of Canal Street and the Bowery in New York's Chinatown. The impact pushed the bus onto the sidewalk and into a bank. A sign attached to a light pole fell, injuring a 57-year-old woman who later died. Several people, including two police officers, were treated for minor injuries. State Department of Transportation inspectors found that the dump truck, owned by CPQ Freight Systems, had eight mechanical issues including faulty brakes which led to the crash.
- On March 12, 2011, at about 5:30 a.m., a bus operated by World Wide Tours traveling to Chinatown, Manhattan from the Mohegan Sun casino in Uncasville, Connecticut crashed, killing 15 people. The crash occurred in the southbound lanes of the New England Thruway segment of Interstate 95 at the border between the Bronx and Pelham Manor, New York. The bus swerved and collided with a metal sign pole, which ripped through it and tore off most of its roof. Thirteen passengers died at the scene, two died at hospitals, and all 17 other people on board were injured. Some surviving passengers said that the driver, Ophadell Williams, fell asleep at the wheel. He was not charged initially, pending investigation. Williams said that he was awake and sober at the time of the crash and he blamed the crash on a tractor-trailer that he swerved to avoid, causing the bus to flip on its side and crash into an overhead highway sign which split the bus in half. He said the two possibly hit each other. The crash triggered an investigation by the New York State Police and National Transportation Safety Board. The truck driver denied the bus driver's account and was cleared of responsibility. The National Transportation Safety Board determined that the probable cause of the accident was driver fatigue. The bus was going at least 64 miles per hour (103 km/h), compared to the 50 miles per hour (80 km/h) speed limit, and faster than other bus traffic. The driver should not have had a license at the time because he had not cleared all previous suspensions from his record. These suspensions were recorded under his middle name while his CDL was under his first name. After his record became public state officials revoked his license. The driver, Ophadell Williams, was charged by the Bronx County District Attorney's office with 54 felony and misdemeanor counts, including charges of criminally negligent homicide and manslaughter. Prosecutors argued that Williams was too tired to get behind the wheel, and was so sleep-deprived that his actions were no different than someone driving under the influence. The NTSB produced animations of the likely crash sequences, published on YouTube. On December 7, 2012, the jury found Williams not guilty of all charges except one count of misdemeanor aggravated unlicensed operation of a motor vehicle; his sentence was commuted to time served.
- On March 14, 2011, on the New Jersey Turnpike, a bus crash killed the driver and injured 40, two critically. In March 2011, these two crashes led officials to confiscate six buses for inadequate brake air pressure, steering violations, and missing driver paperwork.
- On May 31, 2011, at around 5:00 a.m., a commercial tour bus operated by Sky Express crashed on Interstate 95, killing four people and injuring dozens.
- On September 21, 2014, a Chinatown bus overturned and killed two people and injured 48 people in Delaware.
- On March 31, 2015, a Chinatown bus hit and killed a pedestrian in Virginia.
- On September 18, 2017, just after 6:00 a.m., a bus operated by Dahlia Group slammed into a city bus in Flushing, killing Dahlia's driver, a city bus passenger, and a pedestrian, and injuring 16 people.
- On January 5, 2020, a Chinatown bus crash killed five people and injured over 60 people on the Pennsylvania Turnpike. The bus was rounding a curve at night and in light snow when it ran off the right side of the road, hit the adjacent embankment, and overturned. It was then hit by two trucks towing semitrailers. Excessive speed was cited as the probable cause of the incident.
- On August 22, 2025, at 12:22 p.m., a bus operated by M & Y Tour Inc. between New York City and Niagara Falls with 52 passengers crashed in Genesee County, New York, killing five people. The driver said that he was trying to retrieve a water bottle when he lost control of the bus.

== See also ==
- Intercity buses in the United States
- Xe Đò Hoàng – Intercity bus service in Orange County, California
