= Little Saigon, San Jose =

Little Saigon
- Neighborhood of San Jose
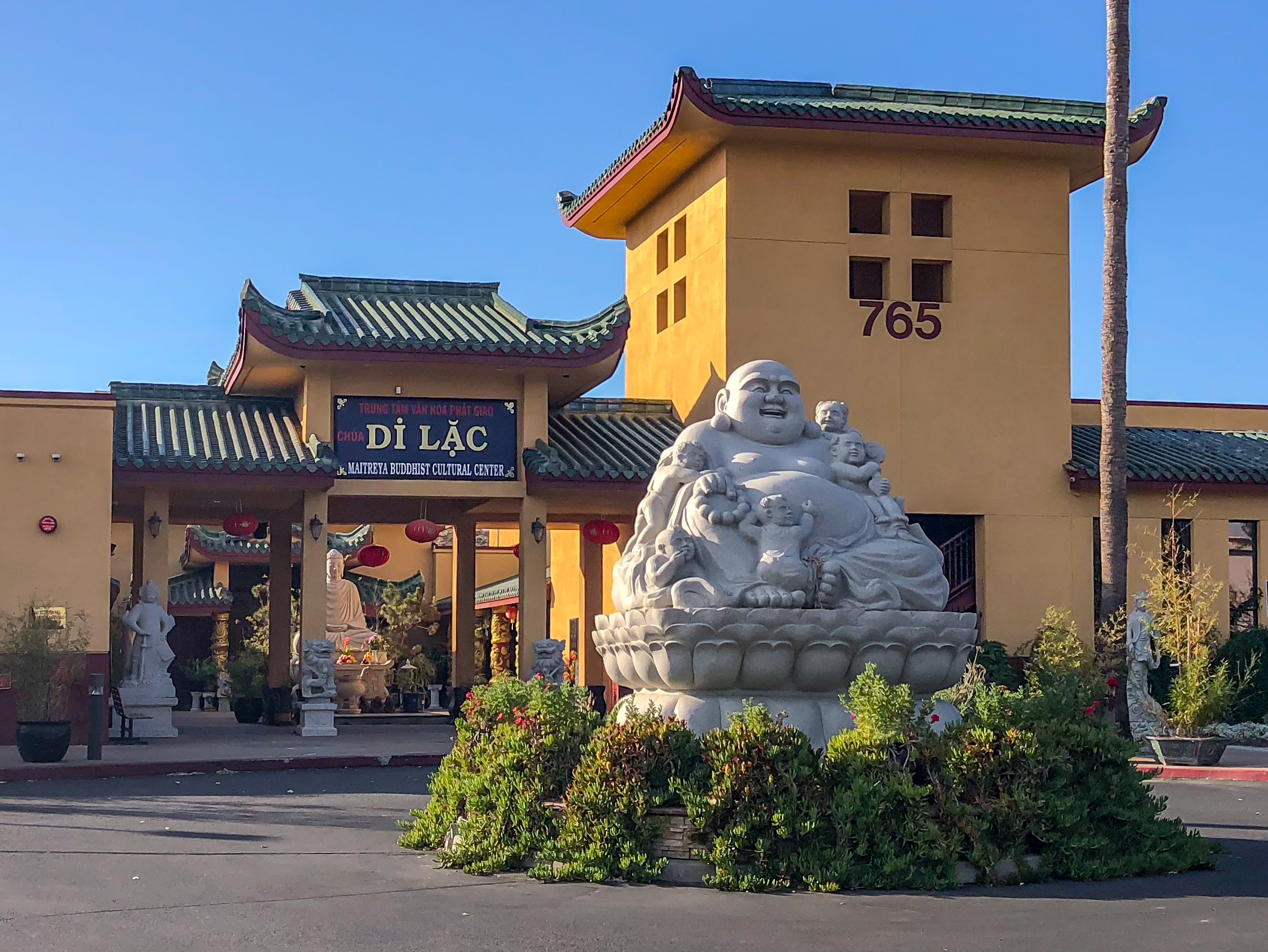
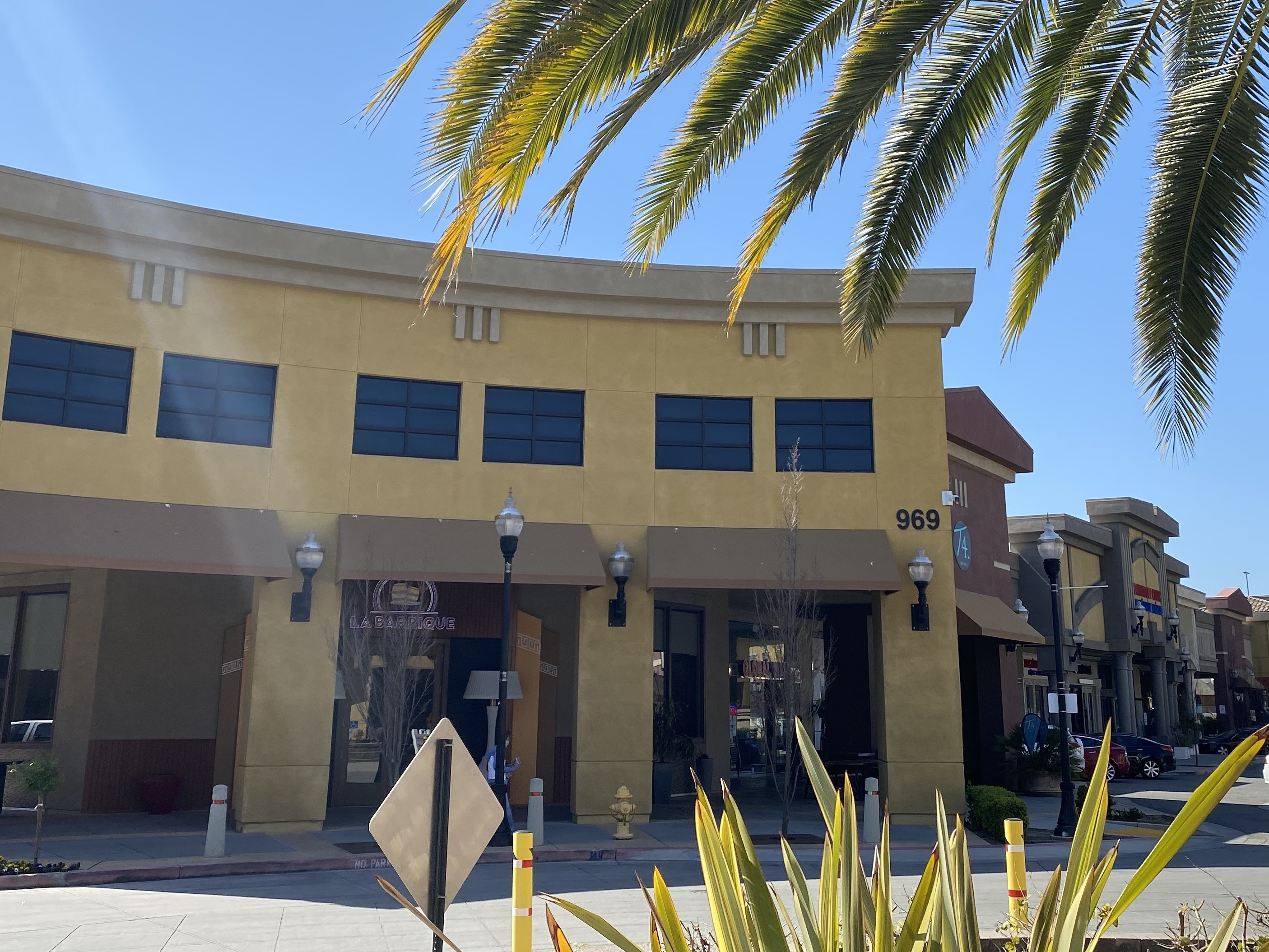
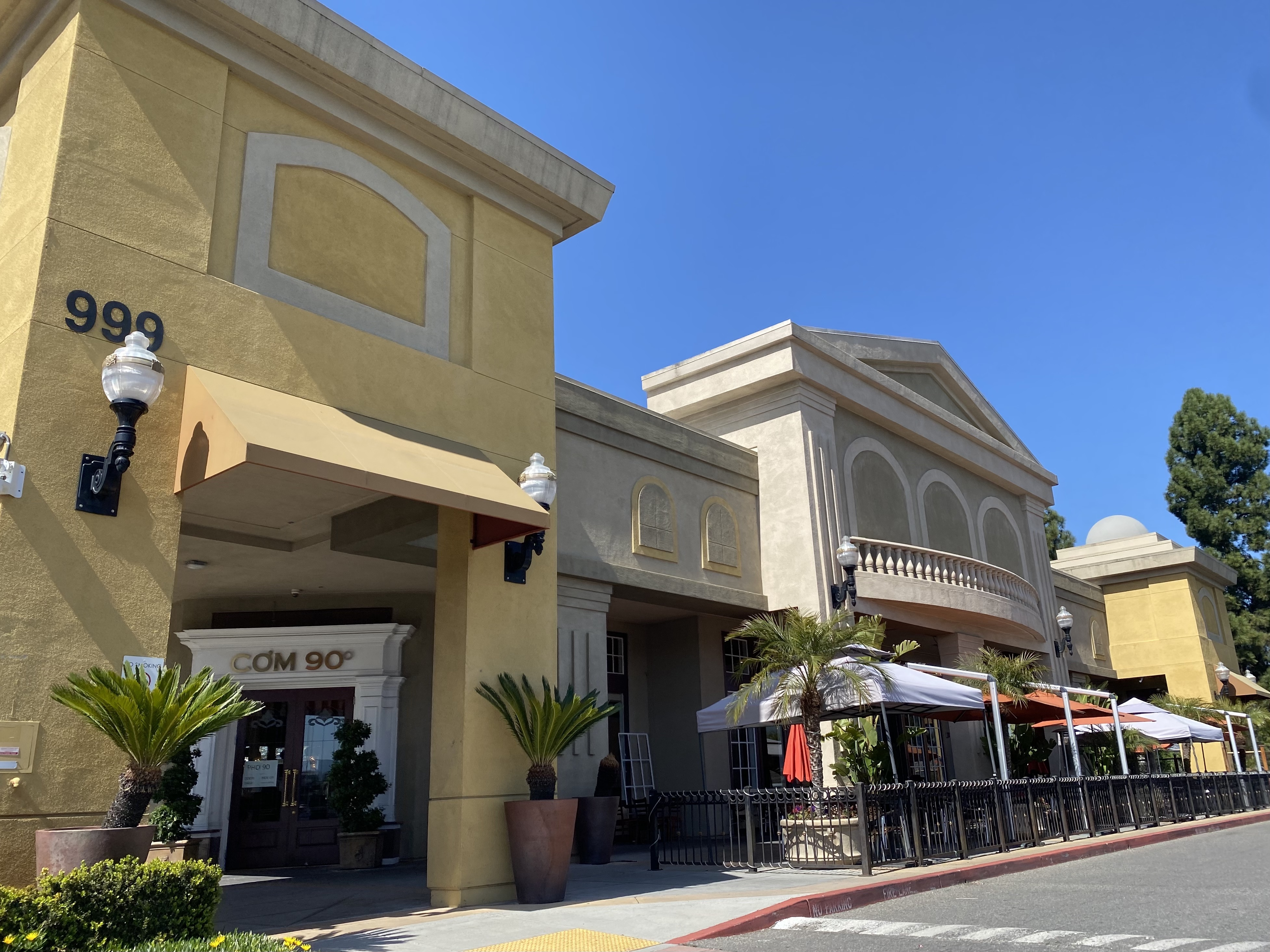
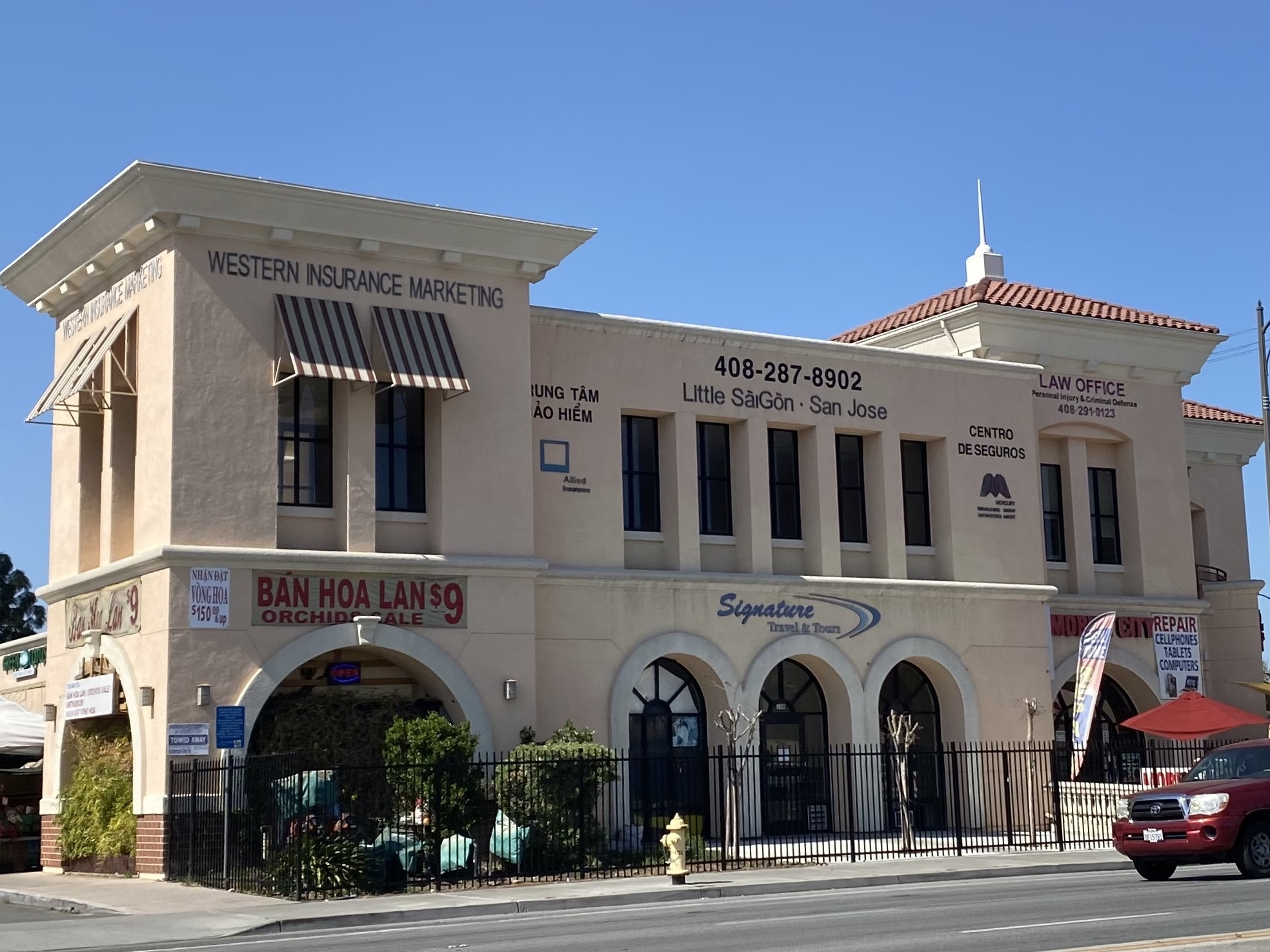

- Location within San Jose
- Coordinates: 37.3318833°N 121.8573377°W
- Country: United States
- State: California
- County: Santa Clara
- City: San Jose

Little Saigon is a neighborhood of San Jose, California, located in East San Jose. It is a hub for Silicon Valley's Vietnamese community and one of the largest Little Saigons in the world, as San Jose has more Vietnamese residents than any city outside of Vietnam. Vietnamese Americans and immigrants in San Jose make up ten percent of the city’s population and about eight percent of the county and South Bay Area.

== History ==
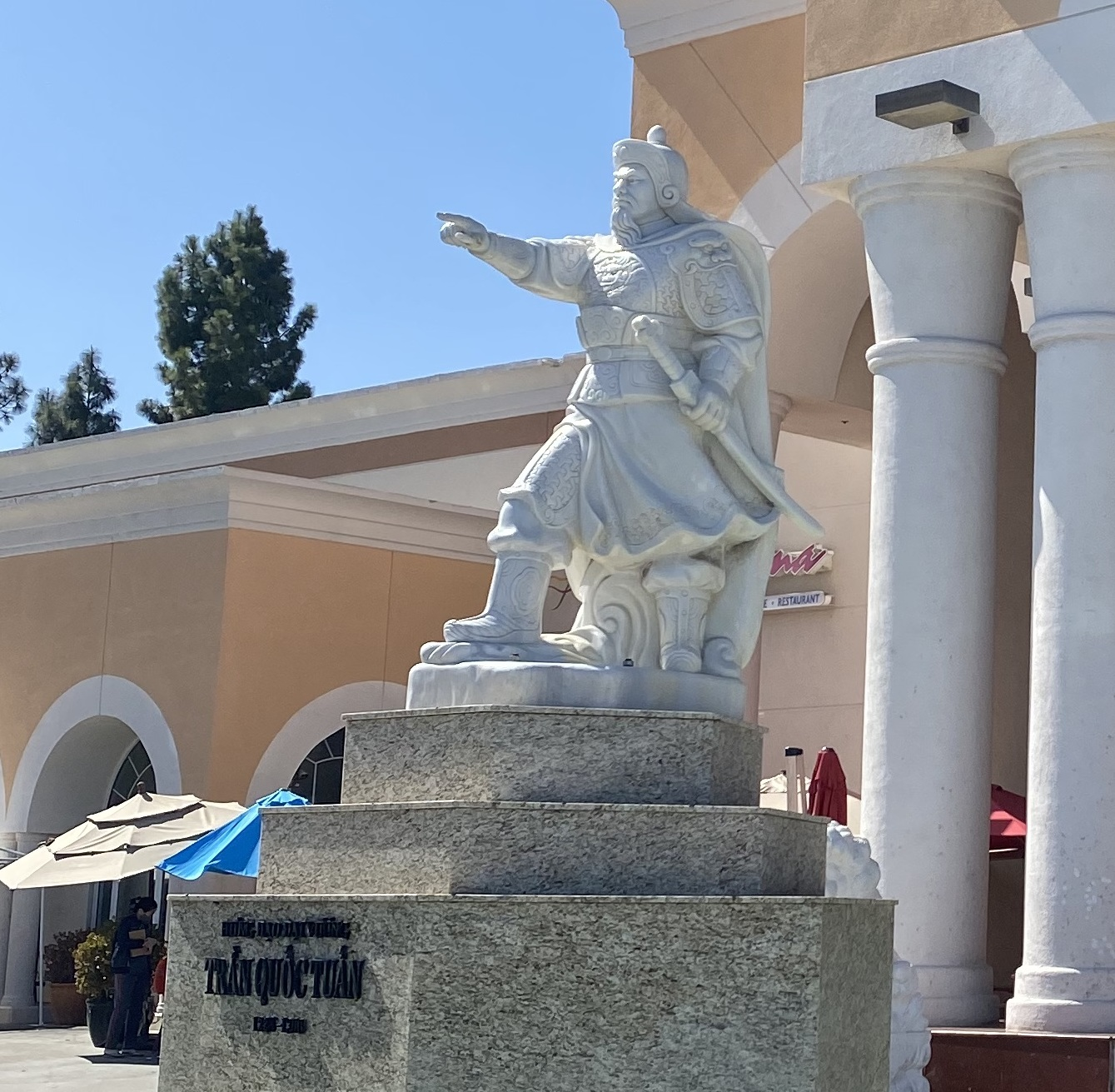
Monument to Trần Quốc Tuấn.

After the fall of Saigon in 1975, many Vietnamese fled their country. San Jose itself had about 17 sponsor companies in which they accepted the first wave of Vietnamese. With the rising jobs in agriculture, manufacturing, technology, and assembly lines - the community grew fast. The diaspora of Vietnam started their own communities and small businesses started booming. Around the mid-1980s through mid 1990s, the second and third wave of mass Vietnamese migration came to light - most were family members of the first wave.

The original Vietnamese hub was off of Tully/King right off the highway 101 - Lion’s Plaza, named after the Sino-influence market - Lion’s Food in the 1980s. The market itself grew and became a hub for all Vietnamese diaspora alike for gathering during Lunar New Years.

Around the early 2000s, the epicenter of the Vietnamese-American community of San Jose grew further out to Story Road and McLaughlin intersection, the home of Grand Century Mall (mid 2000s) and expanded with Vietnam Town (2010s), is officially designated by the San Jose City Council as "Little Saigon".

Lee's Sandwiches, (a Vietnamese banh mi sandwich chain eatery) as well as the phở chain, Pho Hoa Restaurant, had their first locations here in San Jose.

In 2007, the Little Saigon district was officially created and recognized by the City of San José. The city council's initial refusal to name the district Little Saigon prompted protests and a hunger strike at San Jose City Hall by Lý Tống.

In 2021, as part of the Stop Asian Hate campaign, the San Jose Police Department increased patrols through the neighborhood, after a rise in hate crimes against Asian Americans during the COVID-19 pandemic.

== Vietnamese community ==
With over 180,000 Vietnamese residents, (approximately 10.6% of the population as of the 2010 U.S. Census), San Jose has more Vietnamese residents than any single city outside of Vietnam.

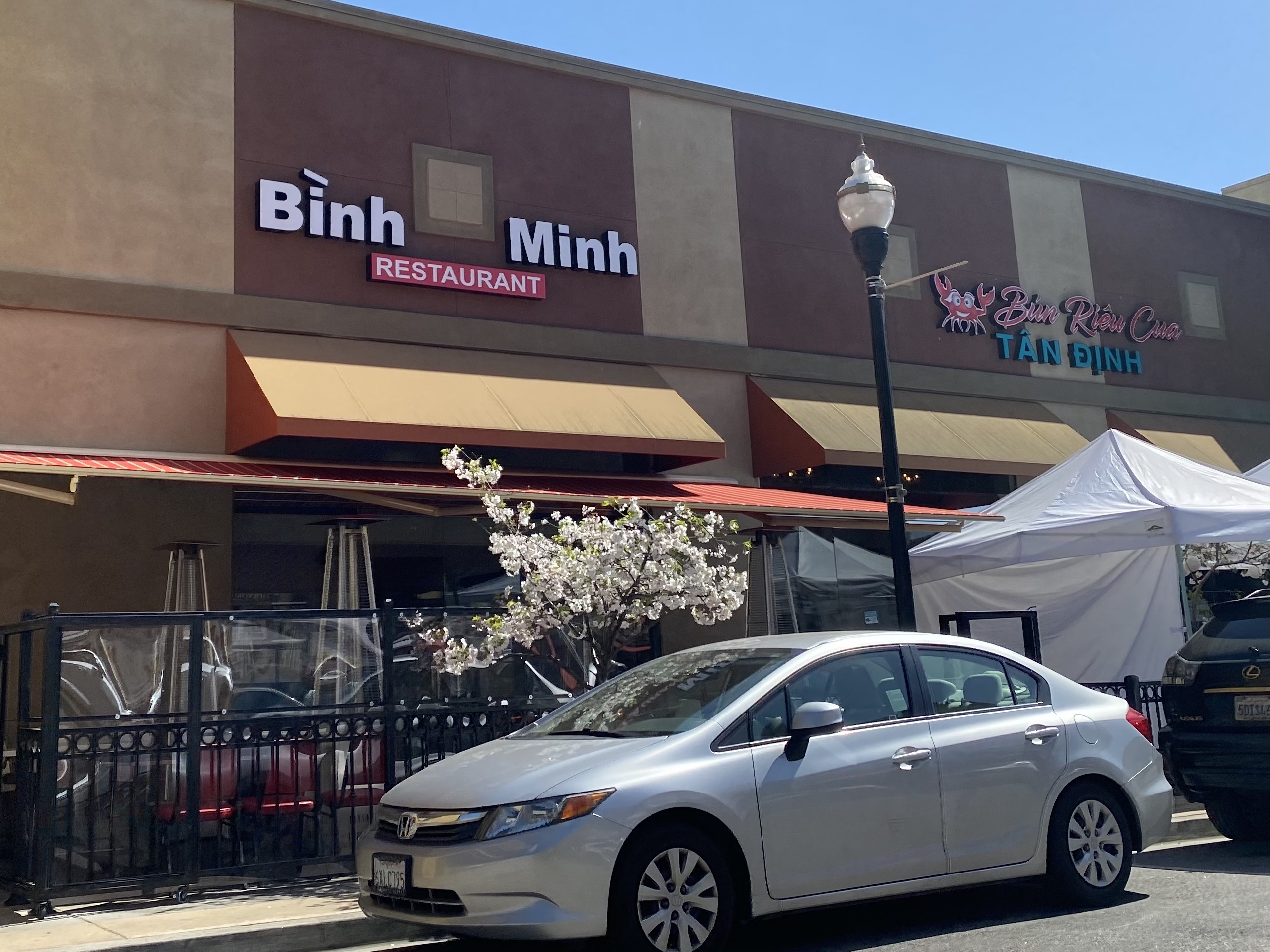
Vietnamese cuisine restaurants.

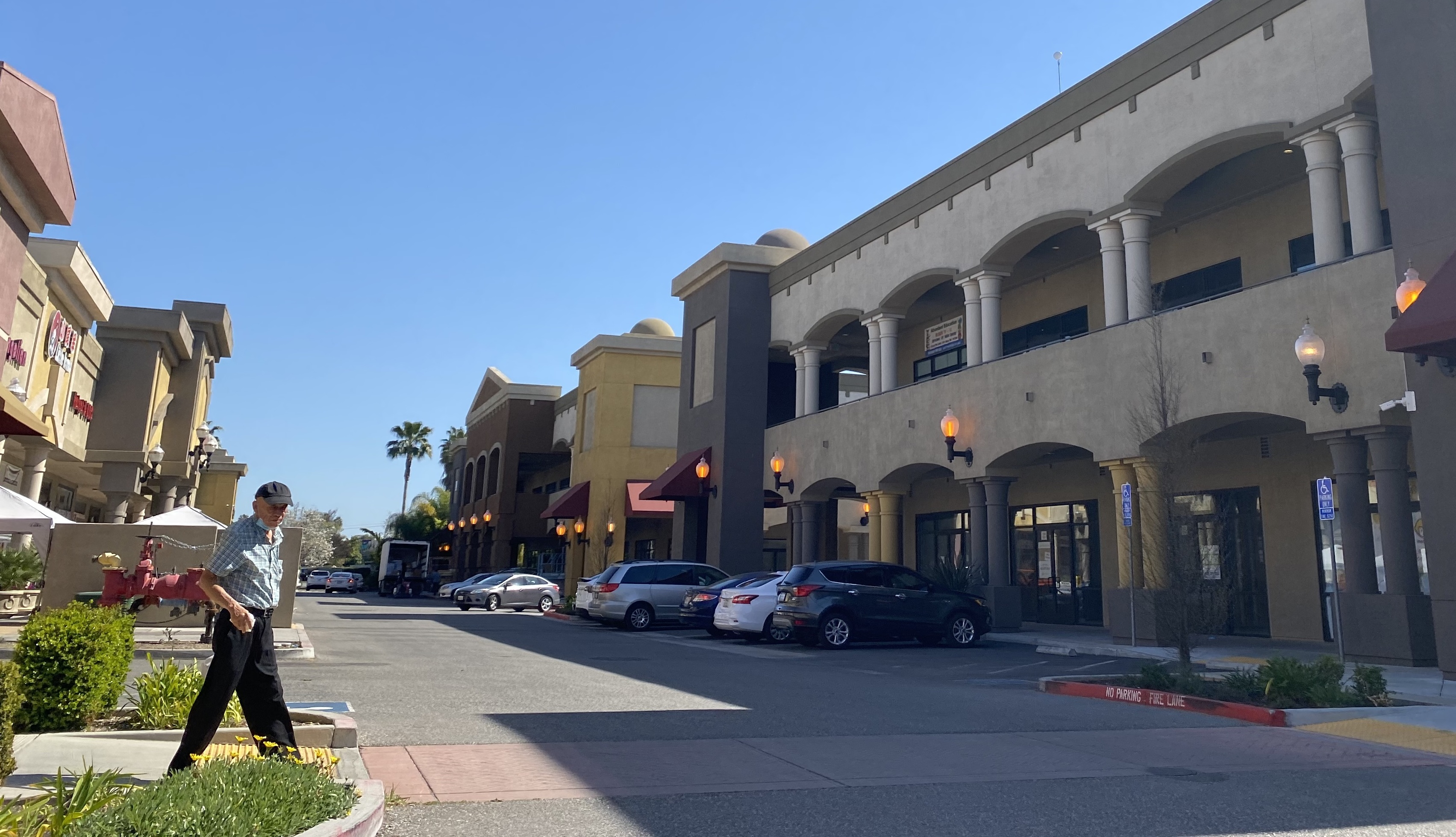
Street in Little Saigon.

The Vietnamese community of San Jose has been politically divided over the naming of the business district, with various groups favoring "Little Saigon", "New Saigon", and "Vietnamese Business District". Non-Vietnamese businesses and residents, as well as the San Jose Hispanic Chamber of Commerce have also opposed the name "Little Saigon".

In November 2007, the San Jose City Council voted 8–3 to choose the compromise name "Saigon Business District", resulting in ongoing protest, debate, and an effort to recall city council member Madison Nguyen, who proposed the name "Saigon Business District". On March 4, 2008, after a public meeting in which more than 1000 "Little Saigon" supporters participated, the city council voted 11–1 to rescind the name "Saigon Business District", but stopped short of renaming it.

Little Saigon is the site of celebrations every year for the Tết (Vietnamese New Year) festival.

An intercity bus service named Xe Đò Hoàng connects the Little Saigon in San Jose to the one in Orange County and various other cities in California and Arizona with high concentration of Vietnamese Americans.

== Geography ==
Little Saigon is located in East San Jose. It is bound by the Junípero Serra Freeway (CA 280) to the north, Senter Road to the west, and the Bayshore Freeway (US 101) to the east. Its southern boundary is roughly Owsley Avenue.

The primary thoroughfare through Little Saigon is Story Road.

== Gallery ==
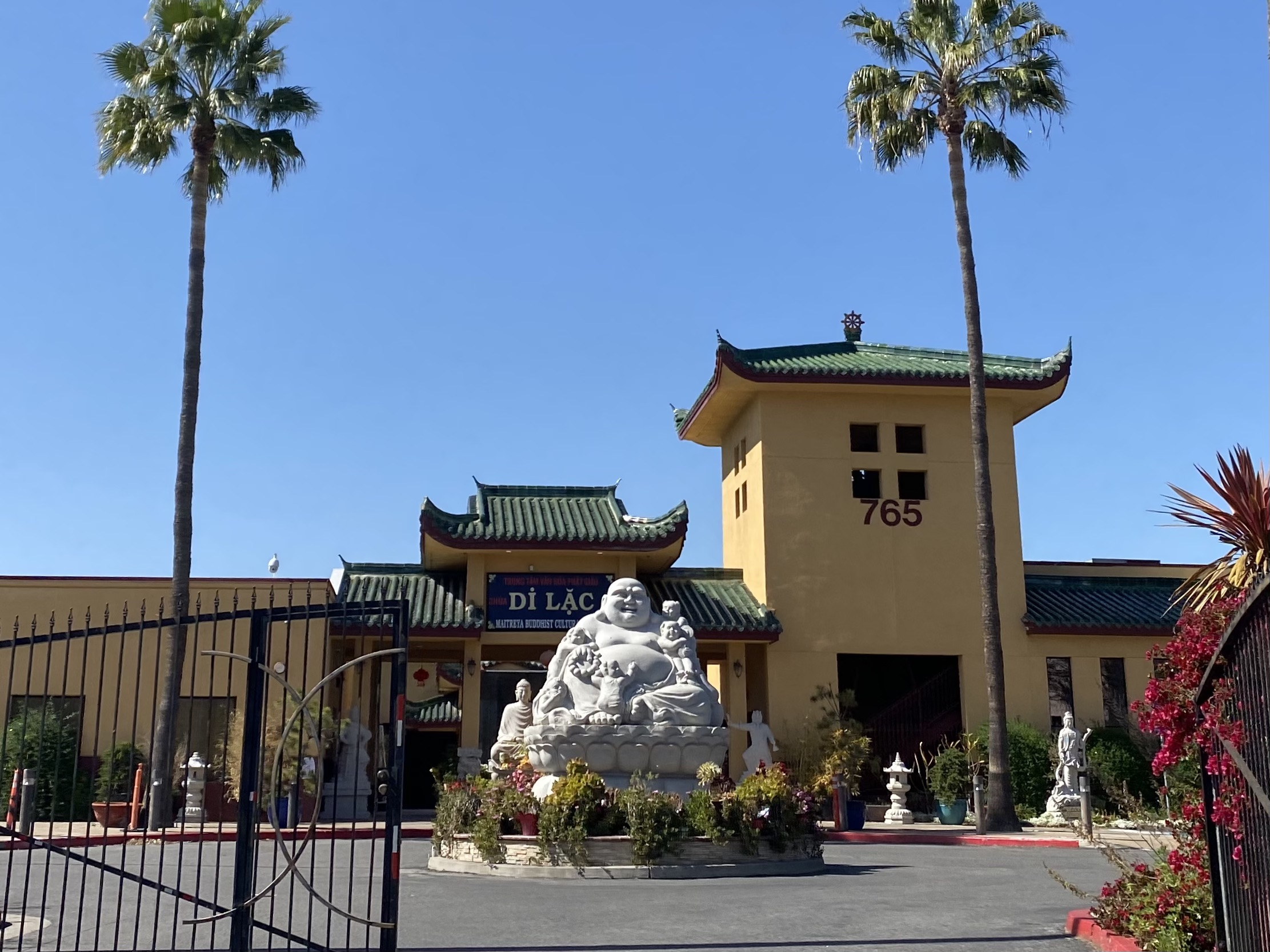
Chùa Di Lặc Buddhist Temple

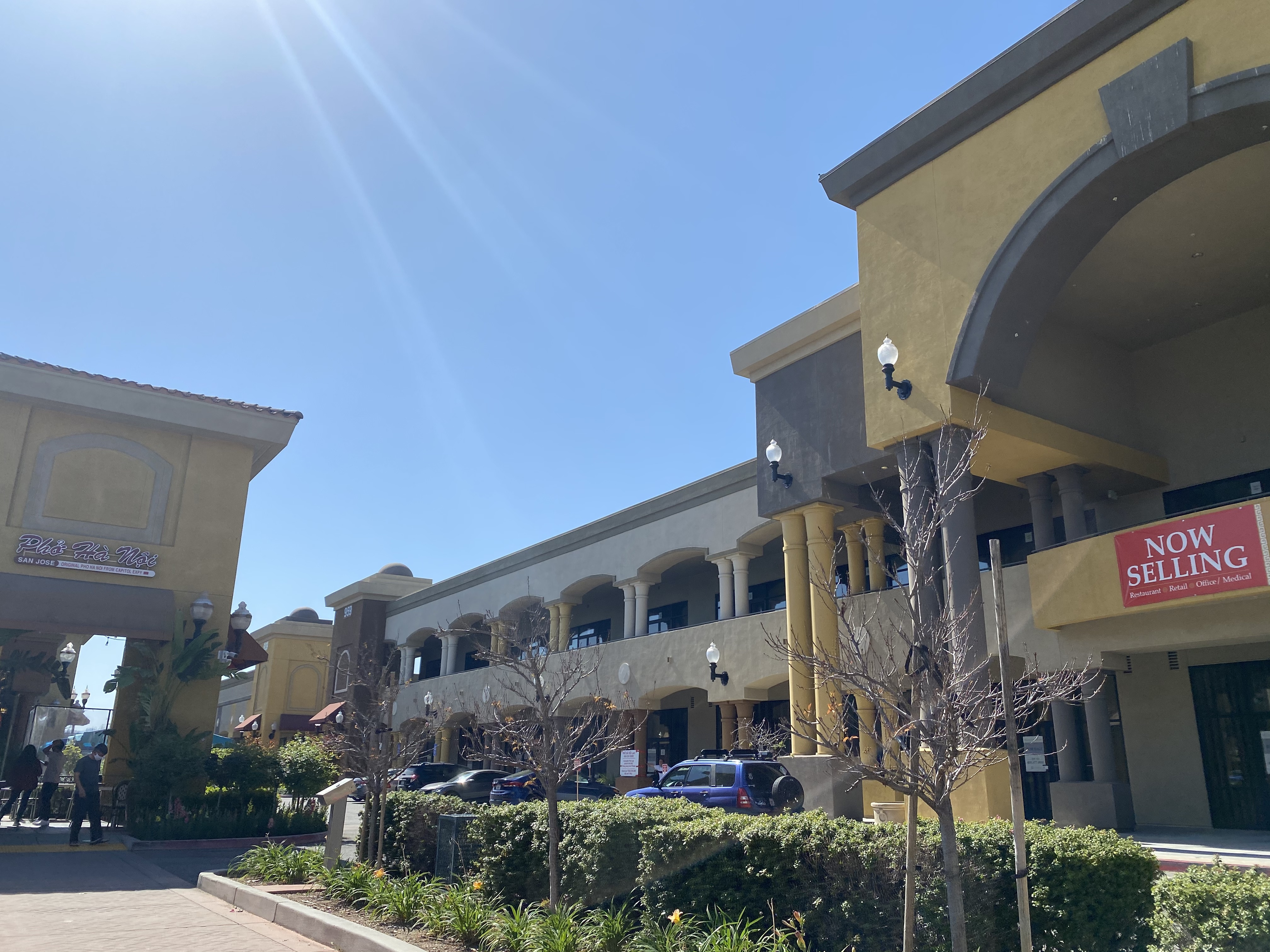
Vietnam Town offices

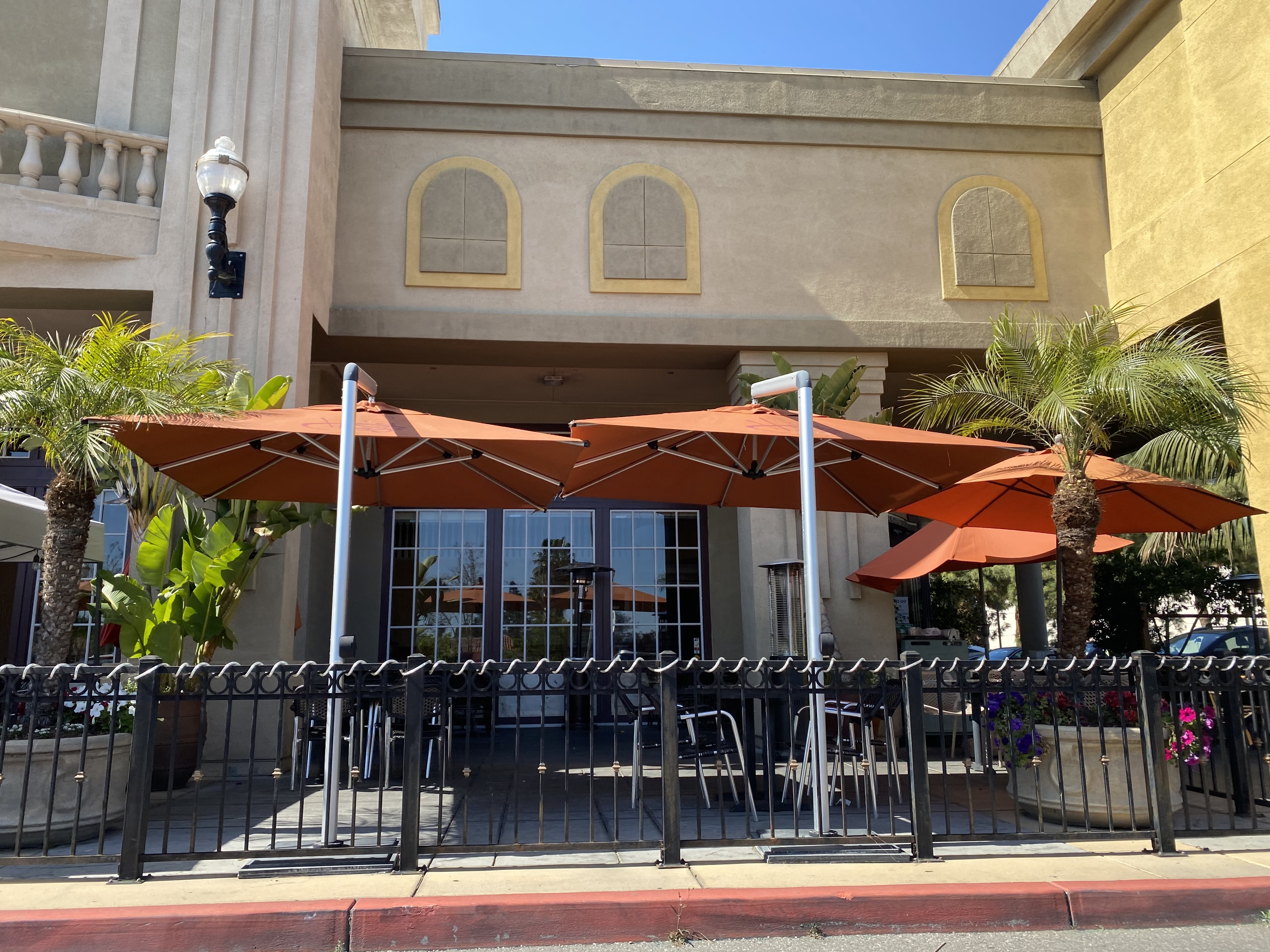
Café in Little Saigon

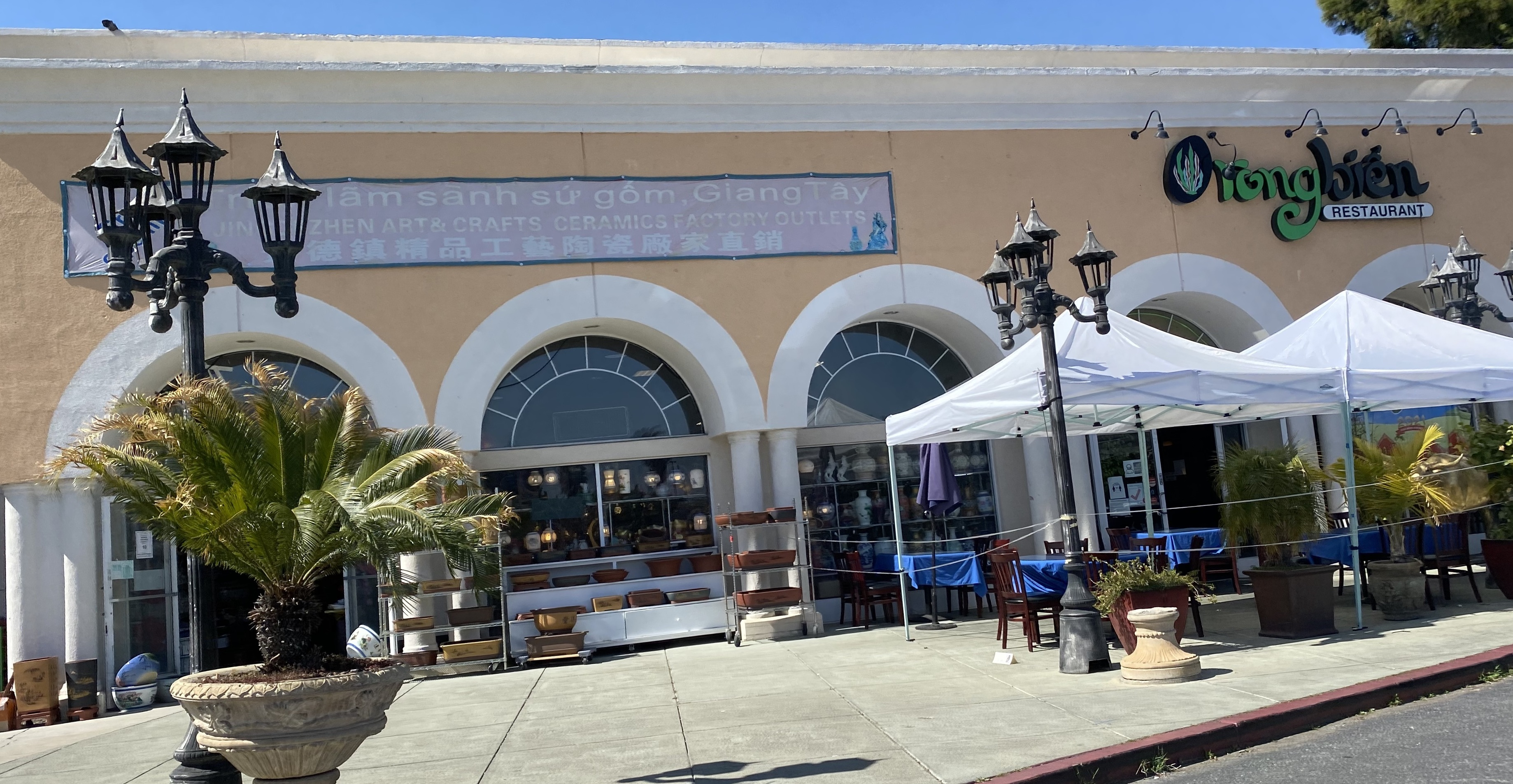
Stores in Little Saigon

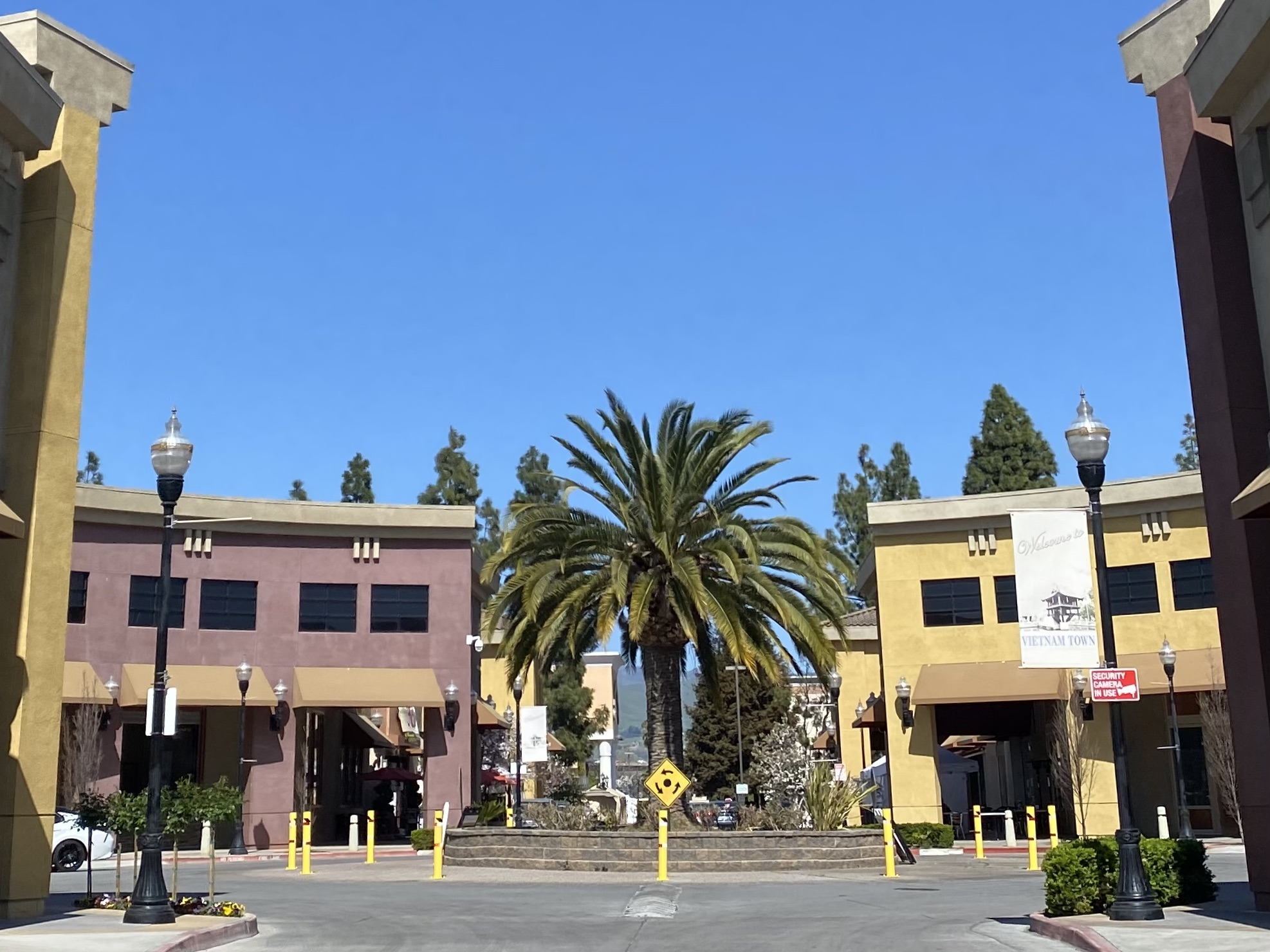
The Vietnam Town roundabout

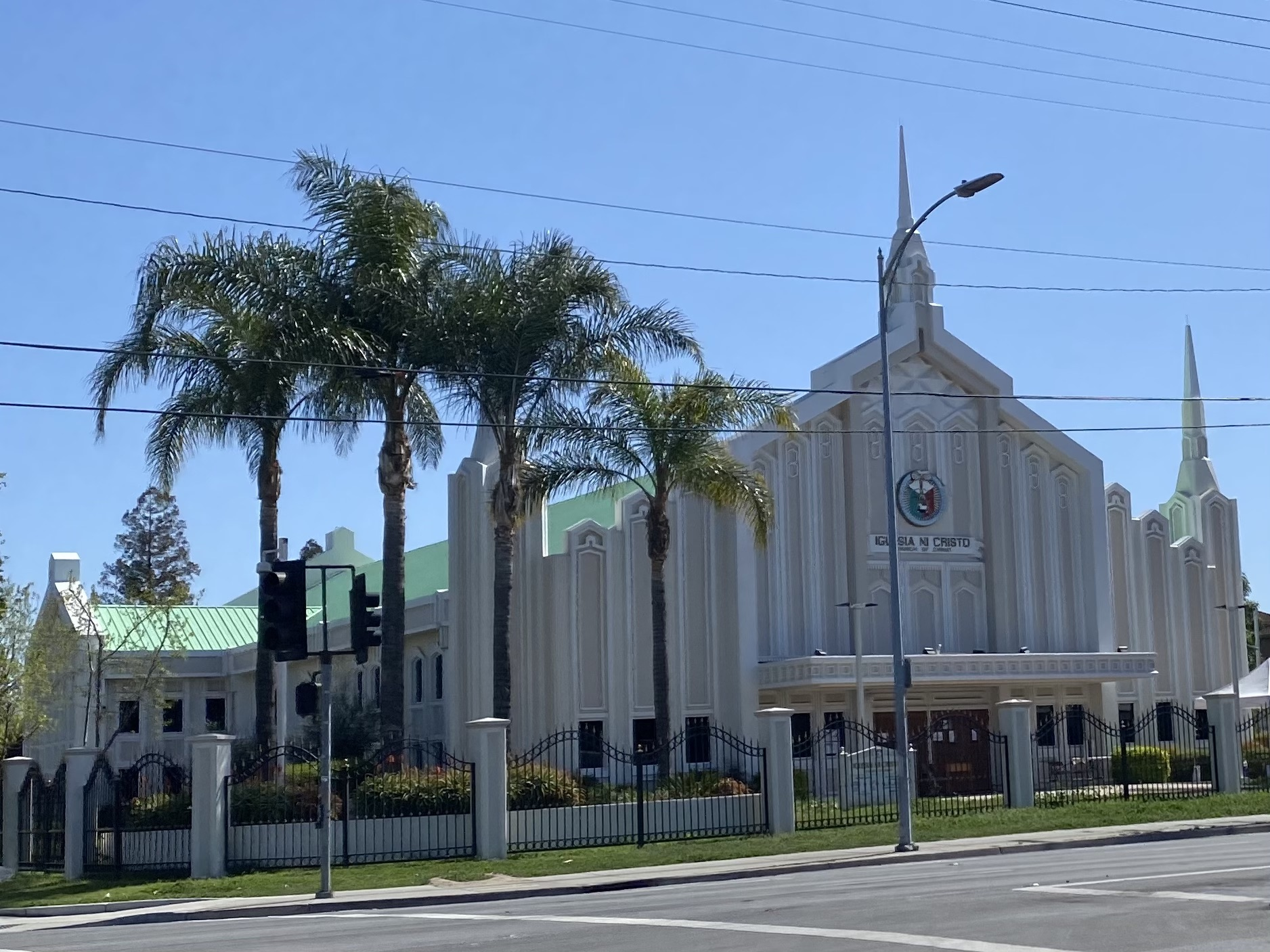
Iglesia ni Cristo
