= Vamoose Bus =

American commercial intercity bus service

- Founded: 2004; 22 years ago
- Headquarters: 360 7th Avenue - 3rd Floor; New York, NY 10001
- Service area: New York City; Bethesda, Maryland; Arlington, Virginia (Rosslyn); Lorton, VA
- Service type: Intercity Coach
- Operator: DC Trails, Inc.
- Website: www.vamoosebus.com

Vamoose Bus is a privately owned intercity bus service that provides daily transportation between New York City and three suburban cities in the Washington, D.C. metropolitan area: Bethesda, Maryland; Arlington, Virginia (Rosslyn area) and Lorton, Virginia. It offers a loyalty program.

== History ==
The service was founded in 2004 by a group of Hasidic Jews who sought to compete with Chinatown bus lines.

In 2010, Vamoose added a luxury vehicle service called the "Gold Bus".

The Lorton route was initiated in January 2011.

In 2013, Vamoose began offering luggage storage service for customers who wish to store their bags during their stay in New York City.

In May 2015, Vamoose Bus initiated a Mercedes-Benz Sprinter transportation service that provides small groups with shuttle transportation to/from NYC-area airports and other NYC metro area destinations.

== Legal challenges ==
Vamoose Bus initially served Tenleytown (near American University) and Downtown Washington, D.C., but in 2006 the company moved the stops outside the District of Columbia, after an injunction was obtained by Washington Deluxe, a competing bus line.

In 2007, Vamoose Bus attempted to launch a route between Boston, Cambridge, and New York City. Instead of using the South Station Bus Terminal, it planned to use curbside stops in Harvard Square and Copley Square. Boston city officials did not approve that plan. Service began on November 8, 2007, serving only Cambridge; it was suspended on November 26 because the company did not apply for a city license.

== See also ==
- Intercity buses in the United States
