= Eastern Bus =

American commercial intercity bus service

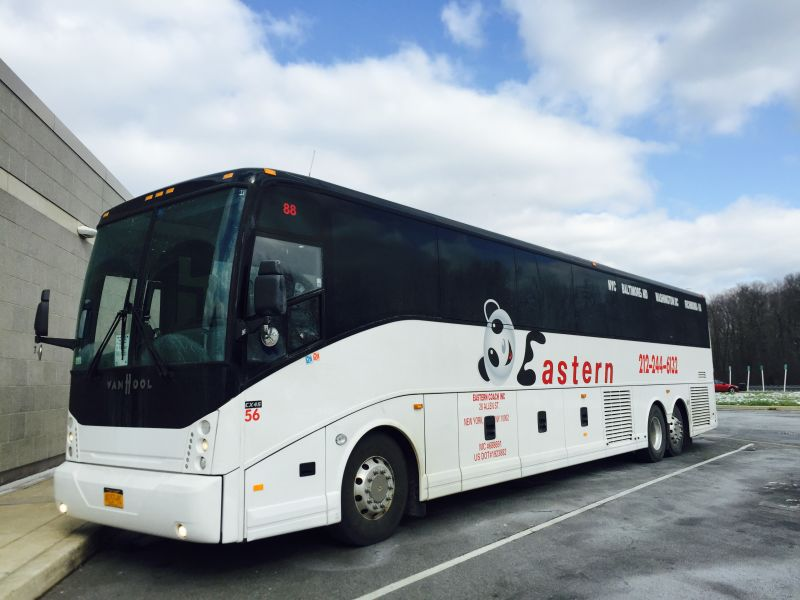
- Eastern Shuttle bus in white livery before the marketing arrangement with Flixbus.
- Founded: 2002; 24 years ago
- Headquarters: 90 Bowery; New York, NY 10013
- Locale: Northeastern United States
- Service area: Interstate 95 corridor
- Service type: Intercity bus service
- Alliance: Flixbus
- Routes: 2
- Stops: 5
- Destinations: 3
- Hubs: New York Pennsylvania Station; Chinatown, Manhattan
- Website: www.flixbus.com

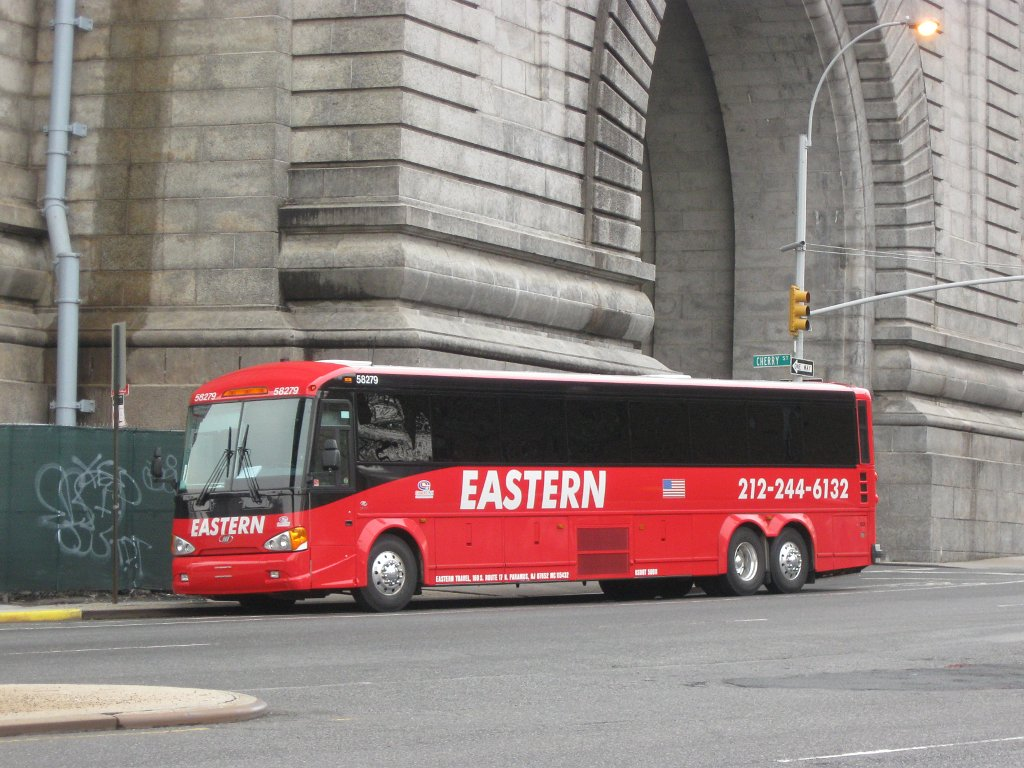
Eastern Shuttle bus in red livery, before the agreement with Flixbus

Eastern Bus, also known as Eastern Shuttle and formerly Eastern Travel, is the operator of intercity bus service between New York City and Richmond, Virginia for Flixbus.

== History ==
The company was founded by Zheng Shui Ming in 2002. Zheng immigrated from Fujian Province in southern China in 1991 on a fishing vessel. He then bought a secondhand minibus from a friend in Queens and started driving. The company attracted cooks and dishwashers with jobs in Chinese restaurants as well as college students.

Eastern hired David Wong, Chinese-born but educated in the United States with a Master of Business Administration (MBA), as a part-owner and manager of its operations. Wong added a stop near Pennsylvania Station in New York.

In 2006, the company had an estimated $3 million in sales.

In fall 2008, Coach USA acquired Eastern. In winter 2009, Coach USA purchased Today's and merged it into Eastern.

In August 2009, Megabus divested itself of Eastern Shuttle.

In May 2019, the company reached a deal with Flixbus, in which Flixbus handles all marketing and sales for the company.
