= Vietnamese cuisine =

Culinary traditions of Vietnam

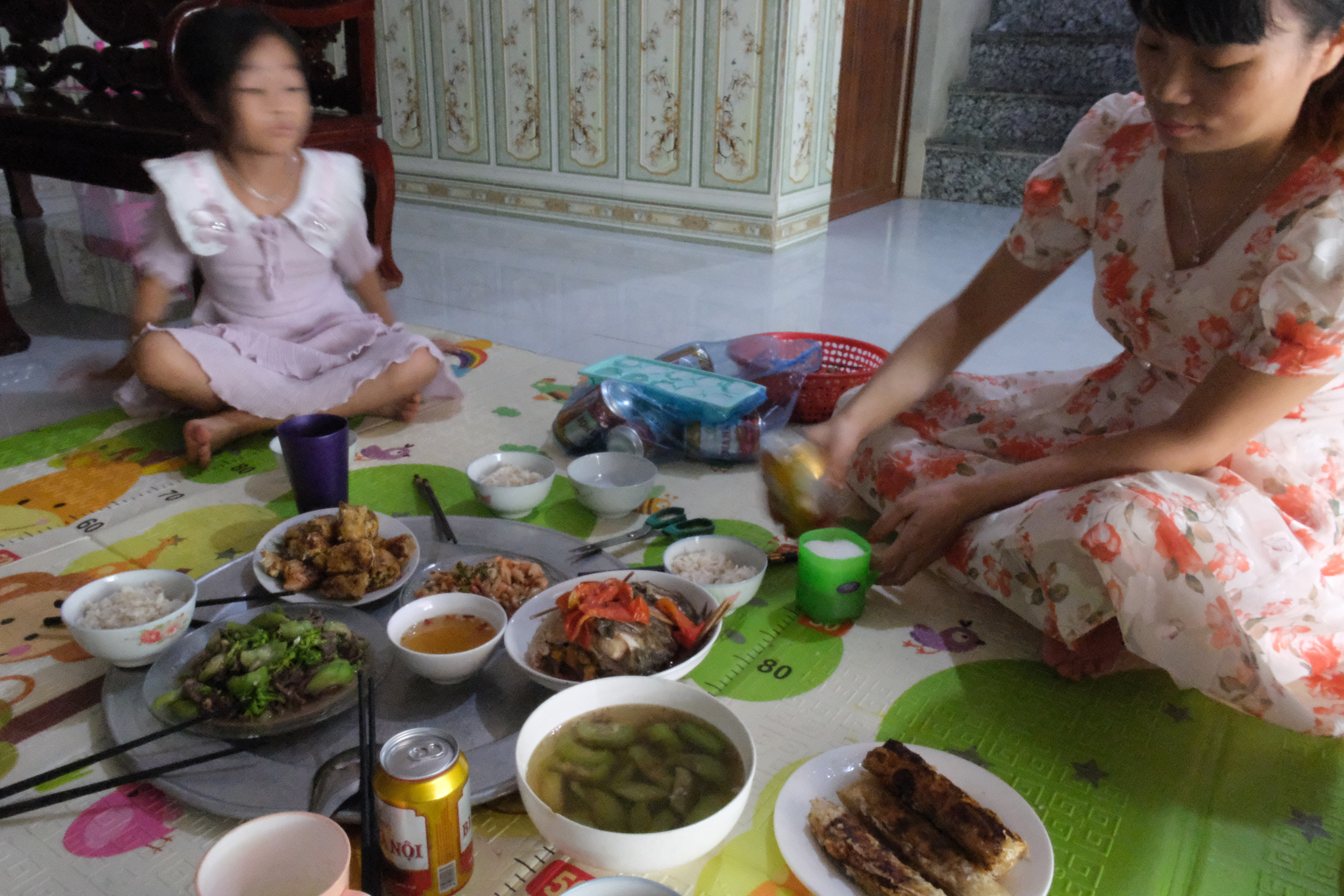
Typical Vietnamese home cooking in Hanoi

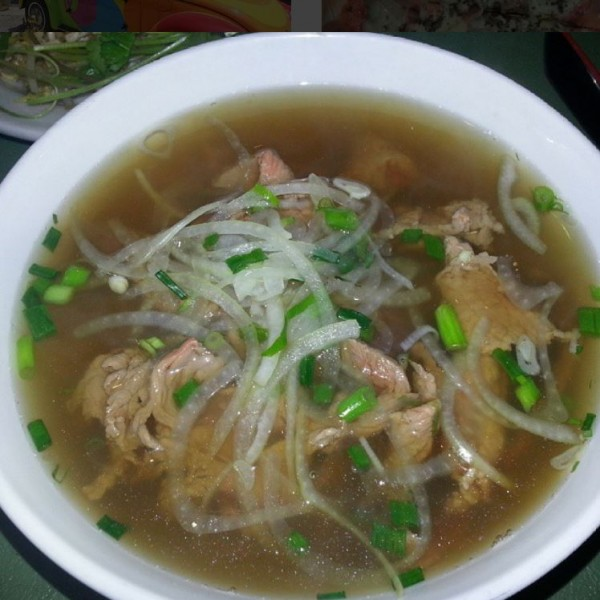
Phở bò (beef noodle soup) from Hội An – different regions have different recipes for their phở.

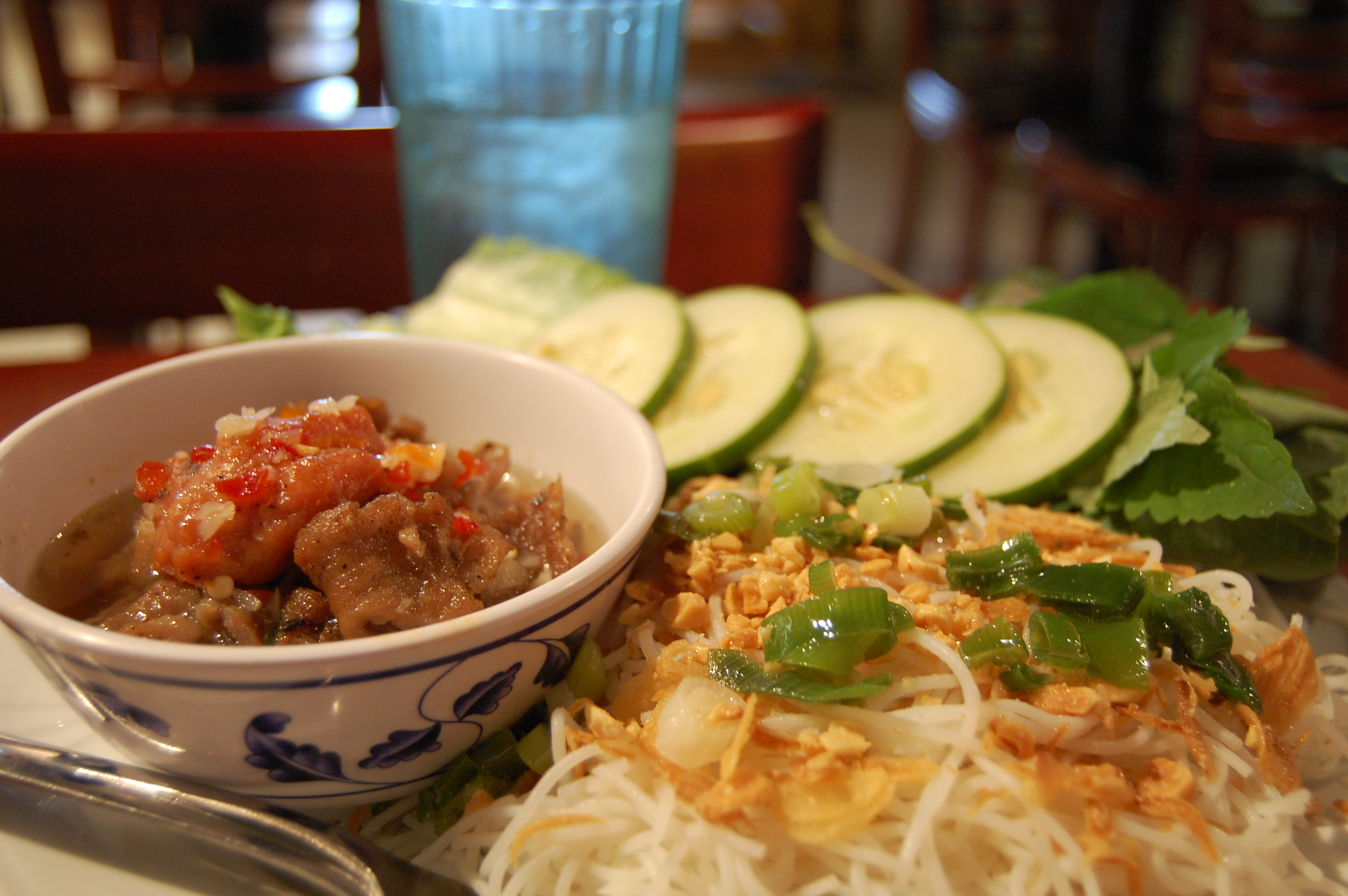
Bún chả, a dish of grilled pork and noodle and herbs

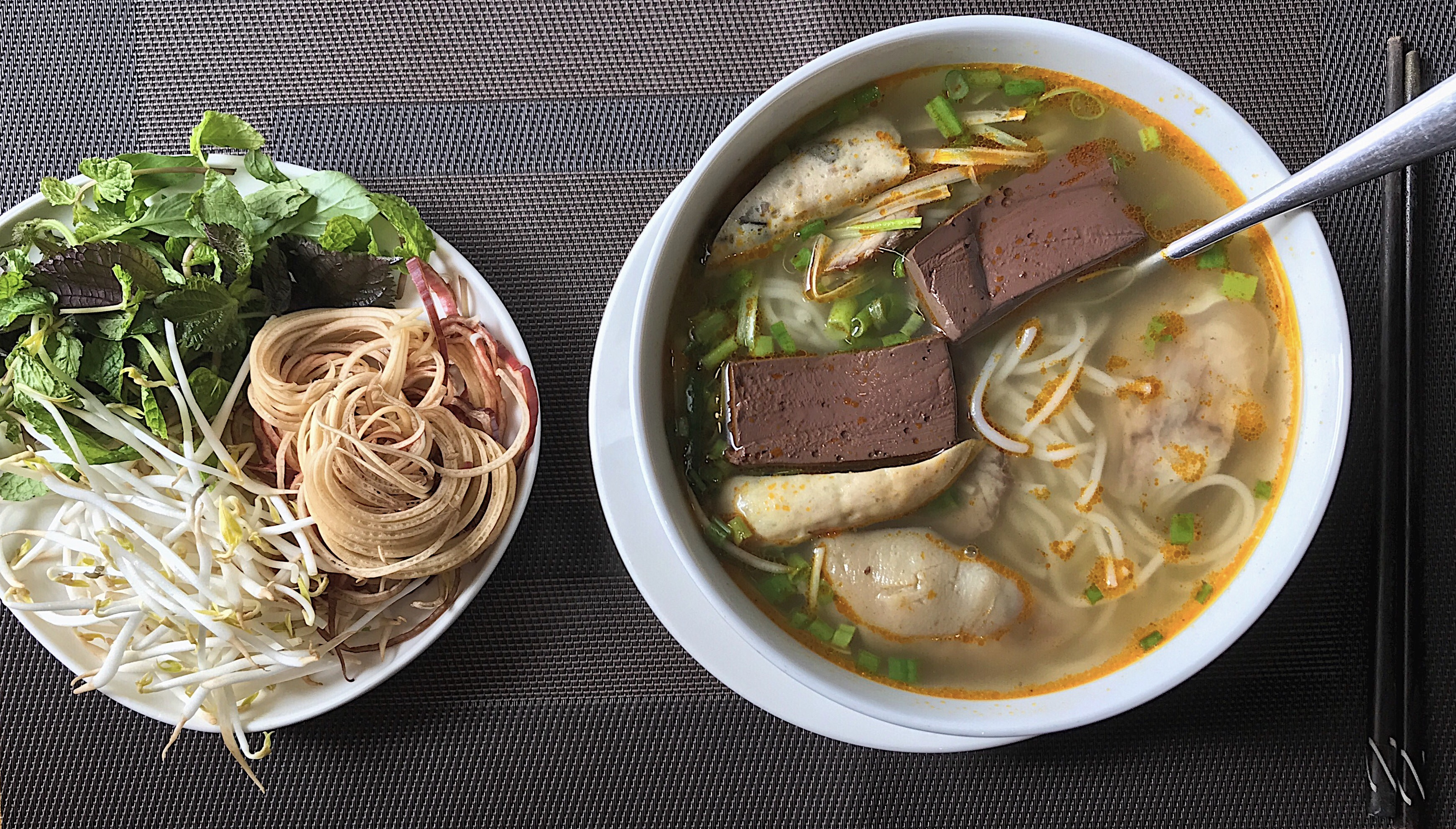
Bún bò Huế, a spicy, lemongrass rice vermicelli noodle soup served with fresh herbs and vegetables

Vietnamese cuisine encompasses the foods and beverages originated from Vietnam. Meals feature a combination of five fundamental tastes (ngũ vị): sweet, salty, bitter, sour, and spicy. The distinctive nature of each dish reflects one or more elements (such as nutrients and colors), which are also based around a five-pronged philosophy. Vietnamese recipes use ingredients like lemongrass, ginger, mint, Vietnamese mint, brown sugar, long coriander, Saigon cinnamon, bird's eye chili, soy sauce, lime, and Thai basil leaves. Traditional Vietnamese cooking has often been characterised as using fresh ingredients, not using much dairy or oil, having interesting textures, and making use of herbs and vegetables. The cuisine is also low in sugar and is almost always naturally gluten-free, as many of the dishes are rice-based instead of wheat-based, made with rice noodles, bánh tráng rice paper wrappers and rice flour.

== Historical influences ==
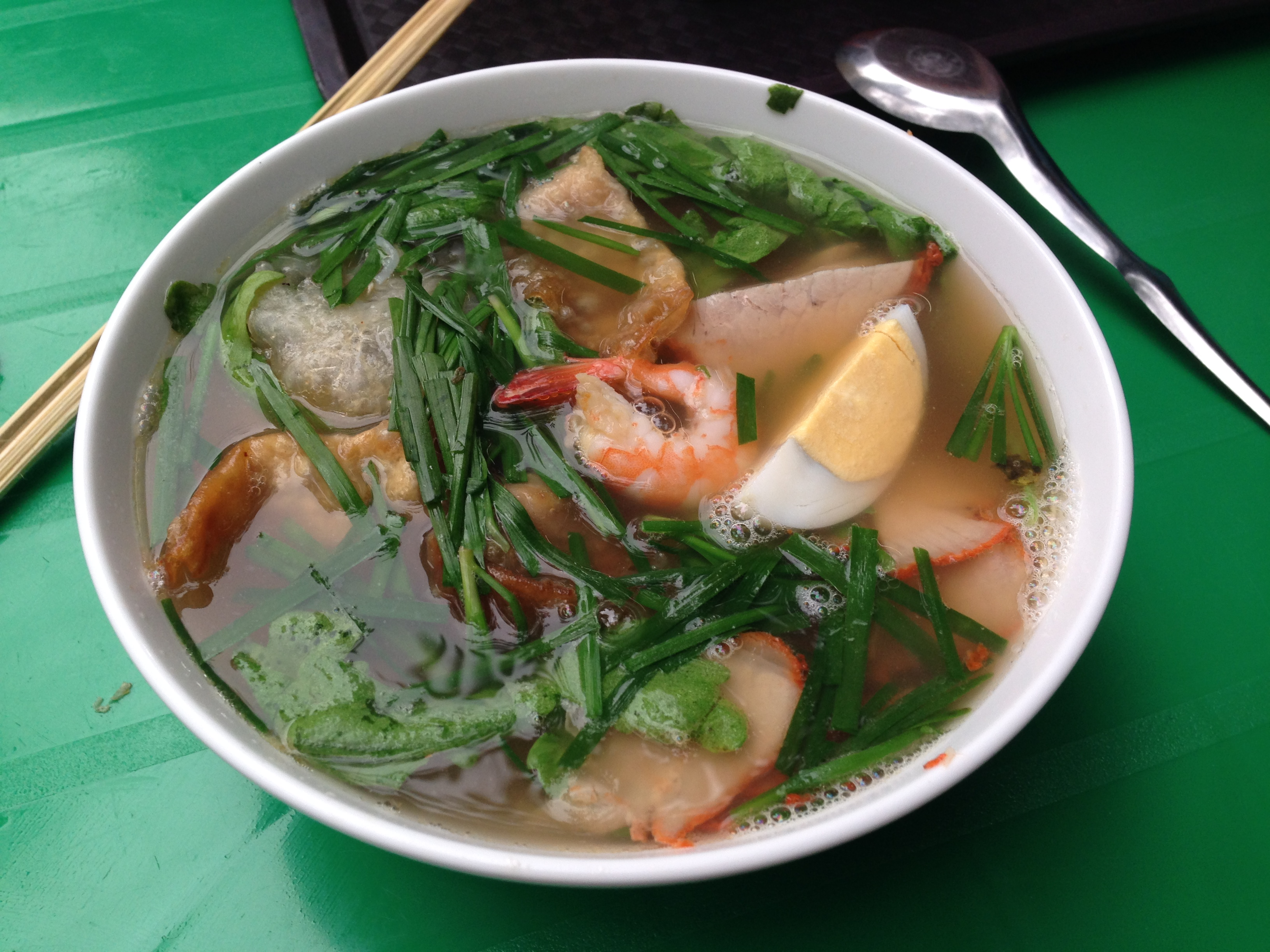
Mì hoành thánh (wonton noodles soup) influenced by Southern Chinese migrants

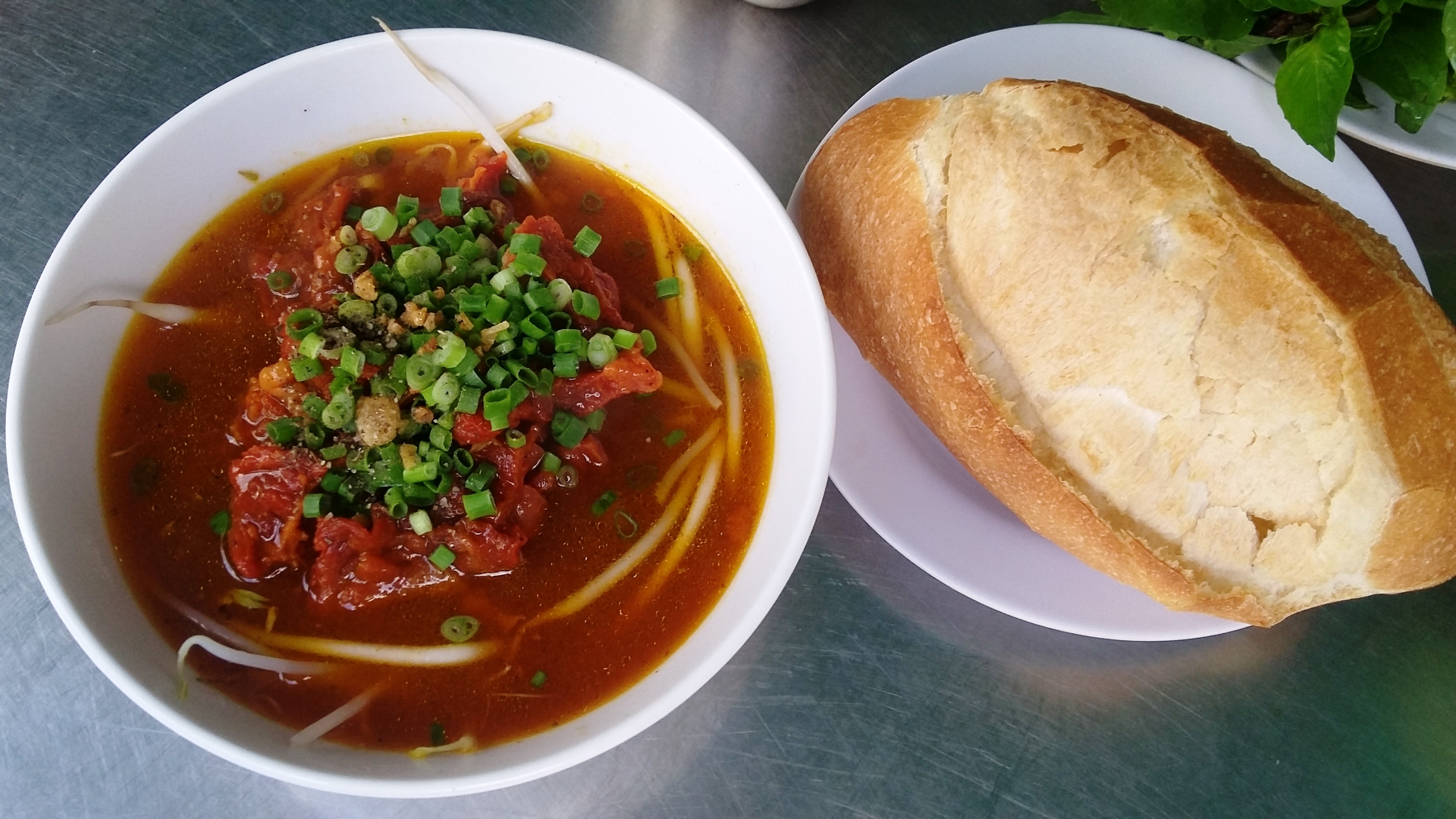
Bò kho (beef stew) and bánh mì (Vietnamese baguette) influenced by the French

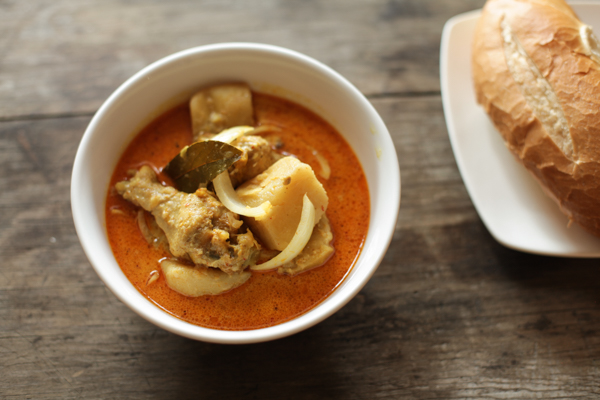
Cà ri gà (chicken curry with coconut milk) influenced by South East Asian cuisine

Besides indigenous Vietnamese influences, which are the major core of Vietnamese food, owing to historical contact with China and centuries of sinicization, some Vietnamese dishes share similarities with Chinese cuisine. In culinary traditions, the Chinese introduced several dishes to Vietnam, including vằn thắn/hoành thánh (wonton), xá xíu (char siu), há cảo (har gow), hủ tiếu (shahe fen), mì (wheat noodles), bò bía (popiah), bánh quẩy (youtiao), mooncake and bánh pía (Suzhou-style mooncake), bánh tổ (nian gao), sủi dìn (tang yuan), bánh bò, bánh bao (baozi), cơm chiên Dương Châu (Yangzhou fried rice), and mì xào (chow mein). The Vietnamese adopted these foods and added their own styles and flavors to the foods. Ethnic minorities in the mountainous region near the China–Vietnam border also adopted some foods from China. Ethnic Tày and Nùng in Lạng Sơn province adopted thịt lợn quay (roasted pork) and khâu nhục (braised pork belly) from China. Some New World vegetables, such as chili peppers and corn (maize), also made their way to Vietnam from the Ming dynasty.

The French introduced baguettes to Vietnam, which were combined with Vietnamese stuffing to become a popular fast food in Vietnam called bánh mì thịt, known overseas as "Vietnamese baguettes". Bánh mì is just the bread, whereas thịt implies meat or stuffing. The French also introduced Vietnam to onions, potatoes, broccoli, tomatoes, cauliflower, lettuce, tarragon, carrot, artichoke, asparagus, and coffee.

The western-introduced ingredients often have a name derived from a similar native Vietnamese ingredient, then adding the word tây (meaning western). Onions are called hành tây (literally "western shallots"), asparagus as măng tây (western bamboo shoots) and potatoes are called khoai tây (western yam) in Vietnamese, which reflects their origin before arriving in Vietnam. French-influenced dishes are numerous and not limited to: sa lát (salad), pâté, patê sô (a Brittany pasty called "pâté chaud"), bánh sừng trâu/bánh sừng bò (croissant), bánh flan, ya ua (yogurt), rôti (rotisserie), bơ (butter), vịt nấu cam (duck à l'orange), ốp lết (omelette), ốp la (œufs au plat), phá xí (farcies), bít tết (beefsteak), sốt vang (cooking with wine), dăm bông (jambon), and xúc xích (saucisse). Owing to influences from French colonial rule, the French Indochinese countries of Laos, Vietnam, and Cambodia have several shared dishes and beverages, including baguettes and coffee. The French also introduced the use of dairy products in Vietnamese-French fusion dishes.

Vietnamese cuisine also has influences from Champa, Malaysia and Cambodia. The use of coconut milk and various central dishes such as bánh khọt were influenced by Cham cuisine. Spices including curries were also introduced to Vietnam by Malay and Indian traders. Though not common in the north, cà ri is a quite popular dish in central and southern Vietnam. The most common form is chicken curry, and to a lesser extent, goat curry. Chicken curry is an indispensable dish in many social gathering events, such as weddings, funerals, graduations, and the yearly death anniversary of a loved one. Similar to Cambodia, curry in Vietnam is eaten either with bread, steamed rice, or round rice noodles (rice vermicelli). Mắm bồ hóc or prahok, adopted from ethnic Khmer in Southern Vietnam, is used as a central ingredient of a Vietnamese rice noodle soup called bún nước lèo which originated with ethnic Khmers in Vietnam and is not found in Cambodia.

Owing to contact with previous communist countries from Eastern Europe, the Vietnamese adopted dishes such as stuffed cabbage soup, sa lát Nga (Olivier salad) and bia Tiệp (Czech beer).

== Regional cuisines ==
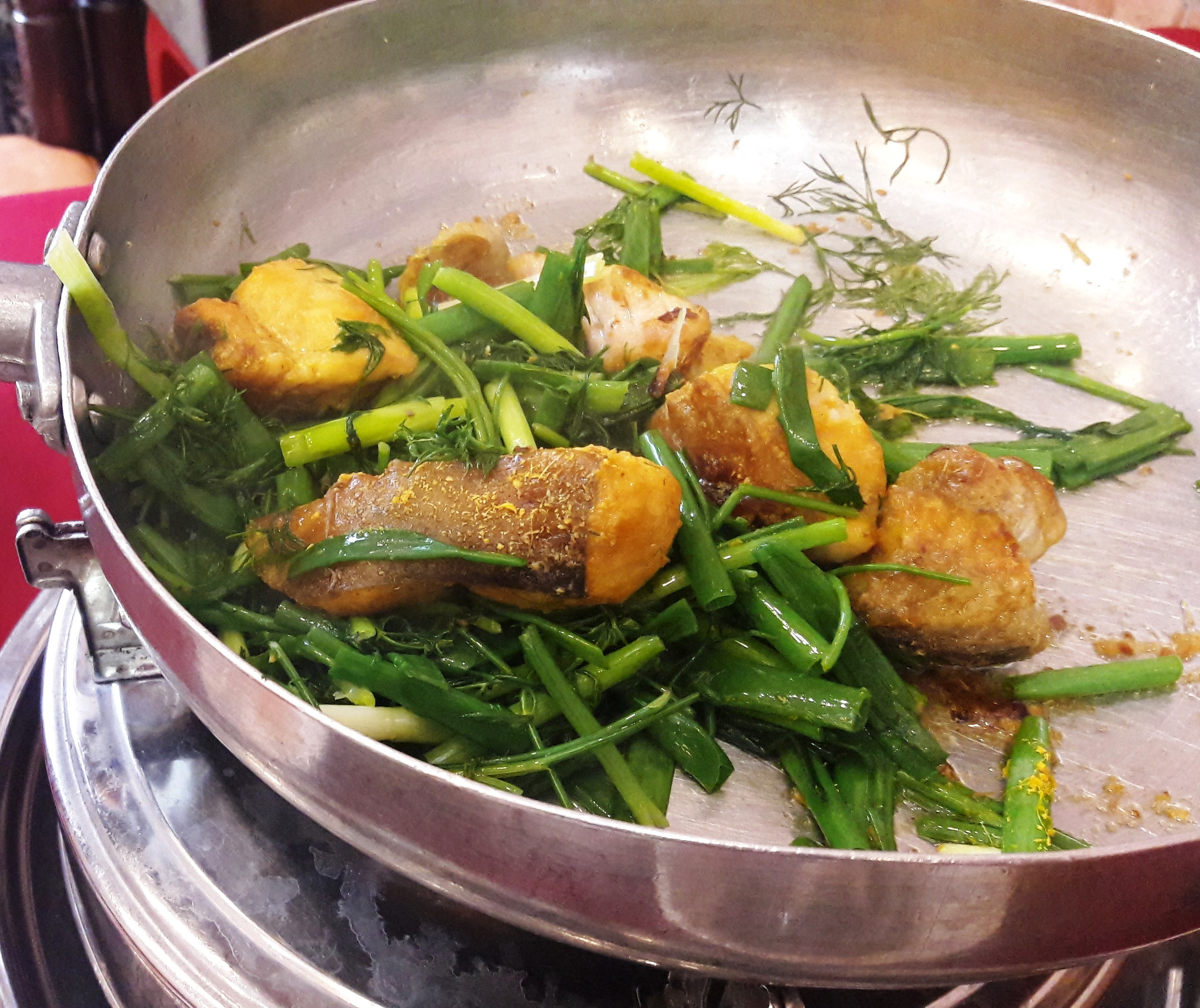
Chả cá Lã Vọng, a specialty of Hanoi

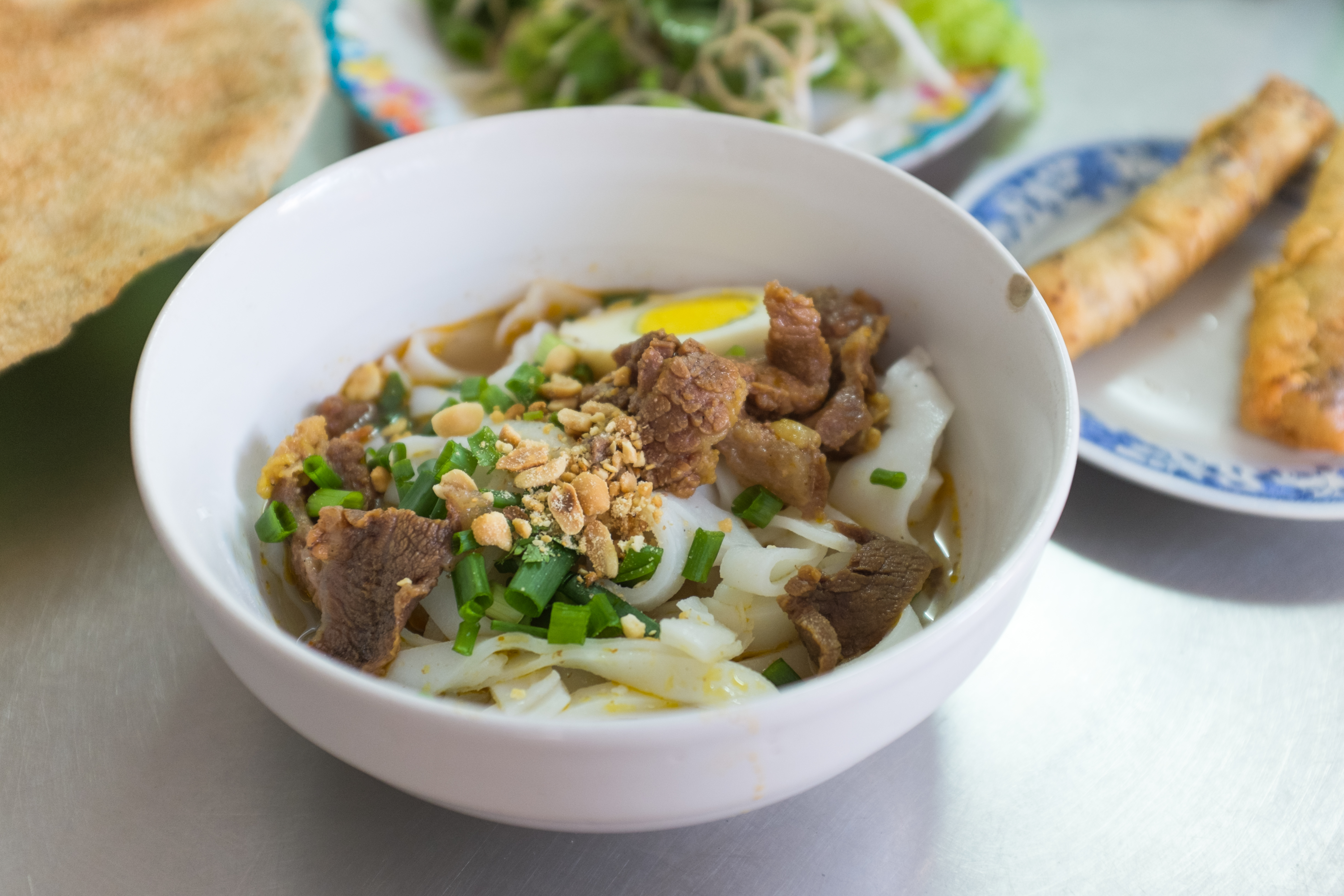
Mì Quảng, a specialty of Đà Nẵng

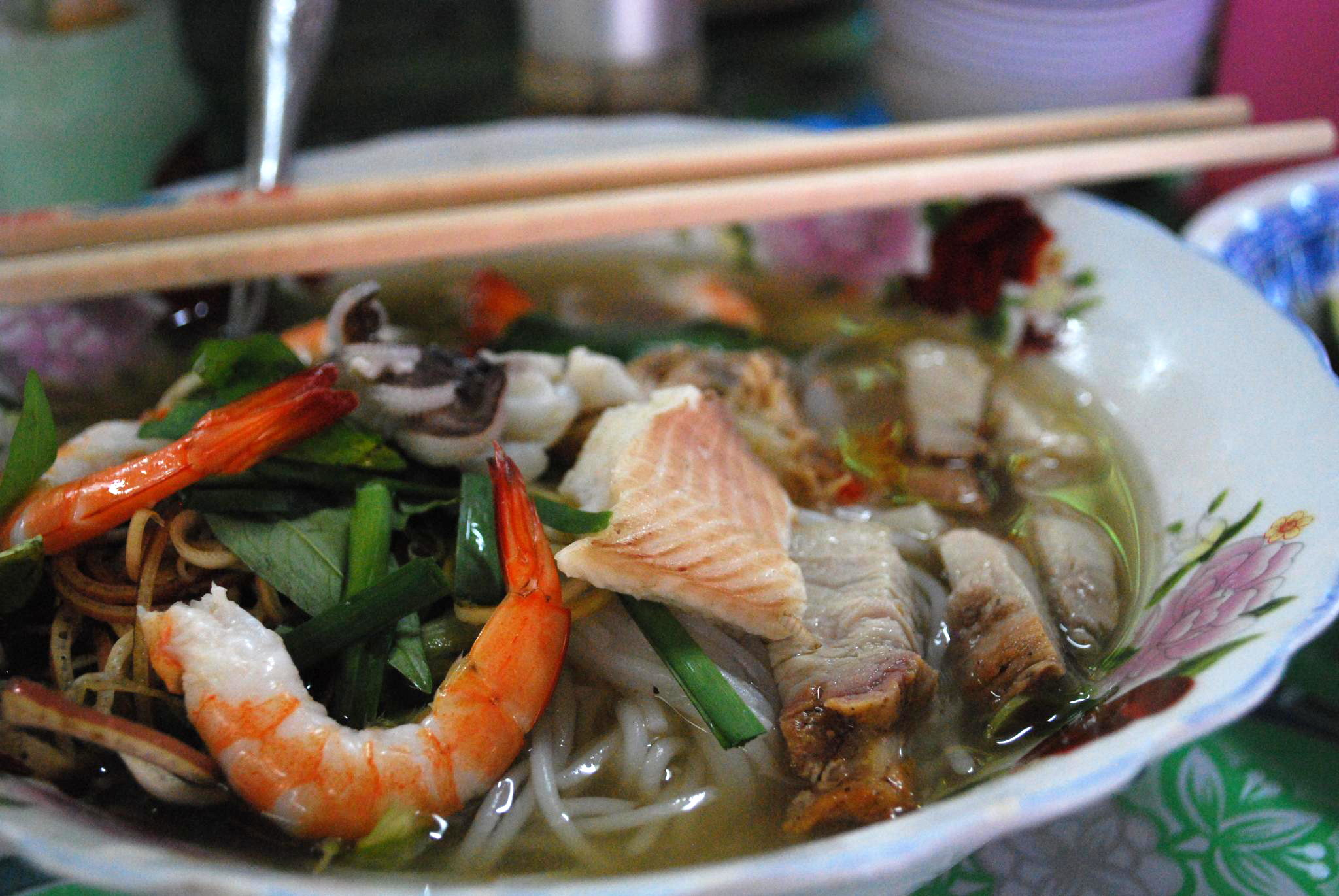
Bún mắm, a specialty of Cần Thơ (former Sóc Trăng province)

The mainstream culinary traditions in all three regions of Vietnam share some fundamental features:

- Freshness of food: Most meats are only briefly cooked. Vegetables are eaten fresh; if they are cooked, they are boiled or only briefly stir-fried.
- Presence of herbs and vegetables: Herbs and vegetables are essential to many Vietnamese dishes and are often abundantly used.
- Variety and harmony of textures: Crisp with soft, watery with crunchy, delicate with rough.
- Broths or soup-based dishes are common in all three regions.
- Presentation: The condiments accompanying Vietnamese meals are usually colorful and arranged in eye-pleasing manners.

While sharing some key features, Vietnamese culinary tradition differs from region to region.

In northern Vietnam, a colder climate limits the production and availability of spices. As a result, the foods there are often less spicy than those in other regions. Black pepper is used in place of chilies as the most popular ingredient to produce spicy flavors. In general, northern Vietnamese cuisine is not bold in any particular taste—sweet, salty, spicy, bitter, or sour. Most northern Vietnamese foods feature light and balanced flavors that result from subtle combinations of many different flavoring ingredients. The use of meats such as pork, beef, and chicken were relatively limited in the past. Freshwater fish, crustaceans, and mollusks, such as prawns and shrimp, squid, crabs, clams, and mussels, are widely used. Many notable dishes of northern Vietnam are crab-centered (e.g., bún riêu). Being the cradle of Vietnamese civilization, northern Vietnam produces many signature dishes of Vietnam, such as bún riêu and bánh cuốn, which were carried to central and southern Vietnam through Vietnamese migration. Other famous Vietnamese dishes that originated from the north, particularly from Hanoi, include "bún chả" (rice noodles with grilled marinated pork), phở gà (chicken soup with rice noodles), chả cá Lã Vọng (rice noodles with grilled fish).

The abundance of spices produced by Central Vietnam's mountainous terrain makes this region's cuisine notable for its spicy food, which sets it apart from the two other regions of Vietnam, where foods are mostly not spicy. Once the capital of the last dynasty of Vietnam, Huế's culinary tradition features highly decorative and colorful food, reflecting the influence of ancient Vietnamese royal cuisine. The region's cuisine is also notable for its sophisticated meals consisting of many complex dishes served in small portions. Chili peppers and shrimp sauces are among the frequently used ingredients. Some Vietnamese signature dishes produced in central Vietnam are bún bò Huế and bánh khoái.

The warm weather and fertile soil of southern Vietnam create an ideal condition for growing a wide variety of fruits, vegetables, and livestock. As a result, foods in southern Vietnam are often vibrant and flavorful, with liberal uses of garlic, shallots, and fresh herbs. Sugar is added to food more than in the other regions. The preference for sweetness in southern Vietnam can also be seen through the widespread use of coconut milk in southern Vietnamese cuisine. Vast shorelines make seafood a natural staple for people in this region. Some signature seafood dishes from southern Vietnam include bánh khọt and bún mắm.

Mekong Delta cuisine relies heavily on fresh products which are abundant in the new land with heavy use of palm sugar, fermented fish, seafood and wild herbs and flowers. The history of the region being a newly settled area reflects on its cuisine; ẩm thực khẩn hoang or "settlers' cuisine" means dishes are prepared fresh from wild and newly-caught ingredients. The cuisine is also influenced by Khmer, Cham and Chinese settlers.

The cuisine of the Northern and Central Highlands regions is influenced by tribal traditions, with items such as thắng cố (Hmong horse stew), dried meats, cơm lam and rượu cần.

== Relation to Vietnamese philosophy ==
Vietnamese cuisine always has five elements which are known for its balance in each of these features.

- Many Vietnamese dishes include five fundamental taste senses (ngũ vị): spicy (metal), sour (wood), bitter (fire), salty (water) and sweet (earth), corresponding to five organs (ngũ tạng): gall bladder, small intestine, large intestine, stomach, and urinary bladder.
- Vietnamese dishes also include five types of nutrients (ngũ chất): powder, water or liquid, mineral elements, protein, and fat.
- Vietnamese cooks try to have five colours (ngũ sắc) in their dishes: white (metal), green (wood), yellow (earth), red (fire) and black (water).
- Dishes in Vietnam appeal to gastronomes via the five senses (năm giác quan): food arrangement attracts the eyes, sounds come from crisp ingredients, five spices are detected on the tongue, aromatic ingredients coming mainly from herbs stimulate the nose, and some meals, especially finger food, can be perceived by touching.

=== Five-element correspondence ===
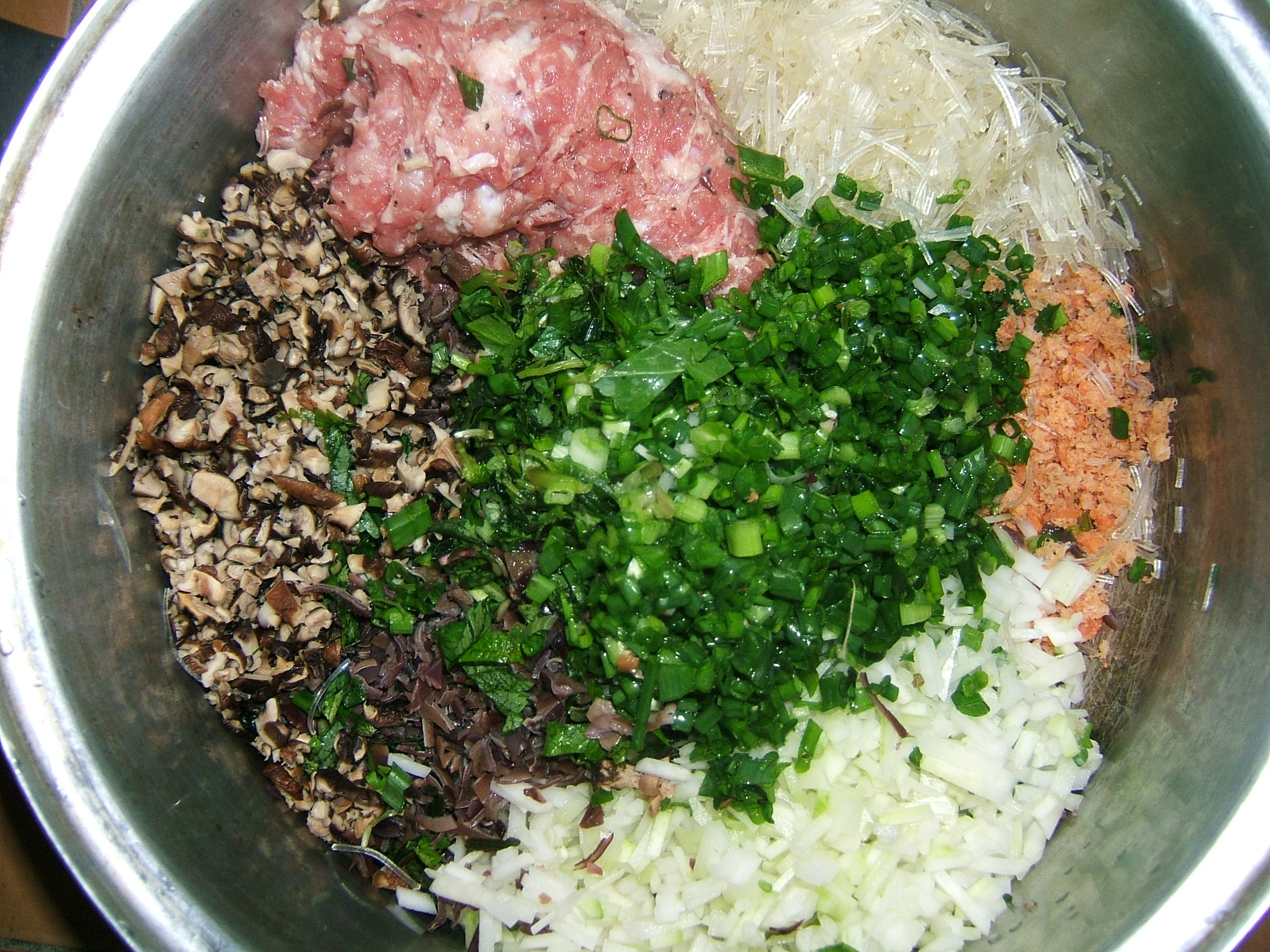
Raw ingredients to make filling of nem rán before mixing together. They represent the five-element principle of Vietnamese cuisine.

Vietnamese cuisine is influenced by the Asian principle of five elements and mahābhūta.

Correspondence	Elements				
Correspondence	Wood	Fire	Earth	Metal	Water
Spices (ngũ vị)	Sour	Bitter	Sweet	Spicy	Salty
Organs (ngũ tạng)	Gall bladder	Small intestine	Stomach	Large intestine	Urinary bladder
Colors (ngũ sắc)	Green	Red	Yellow	White	Black
Senses (ngũ giác)	Visual	Taste	Touch	Smell	Sound
Nutrients (ngũ chất)	Carbohydrates	Fat	Protein	Minerals	Water

=== Yin-yang balance ===
The principle of yin and yang (Vietnamese: Âm dương) is applied in composing a meal in a way that provides a balance that is beneficial for the body. While contrasting texture and flavors are important, the principle primarily concerns the "heating" and "cooling" properties of ingredients. Certain dishes are served in their respective seasons to provide contrasts in temperature and spiciness of the food and environment. Some examples are:

- Duck meat, considered "cool", is served during the hot summer with ginger fish sauce, which is "warm". Conversely, chicken, which is "warm", and pork, which is "hot", are eaten in the winter.
- Seafoods ranging from "cool" to "cold" are suitable to use with ginger ("warm").
- Spicy foods ("hot") are typically balanced with sourness, which is considered "cool".
- Balut (trứng vịt lộn), meaning "upside-down egg" ("cold"), must be combined with Vietnamese mint (rau răm) ("hot").

== Food in relation to lifestyle ==
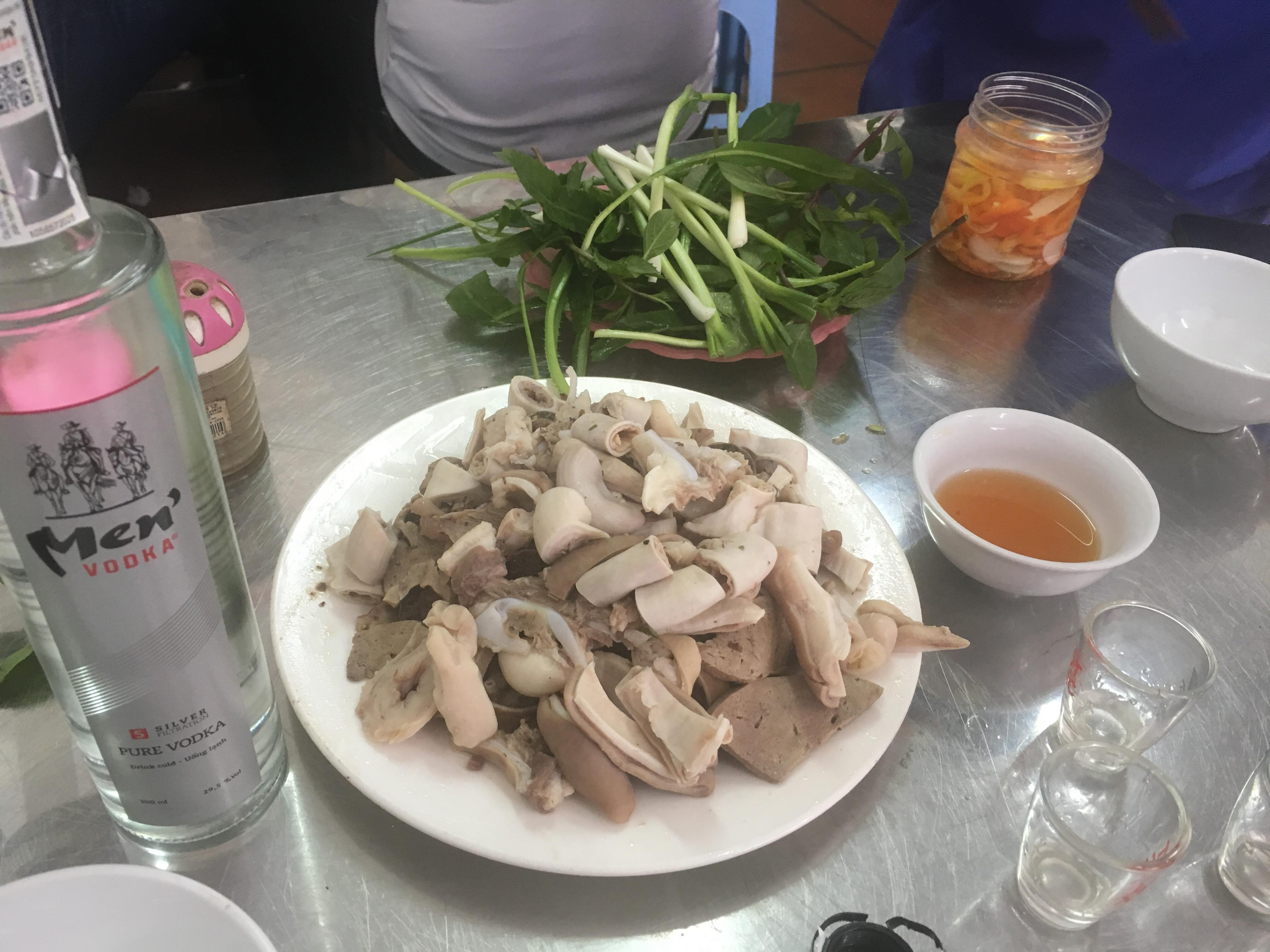
A platter of different boiled pork offal

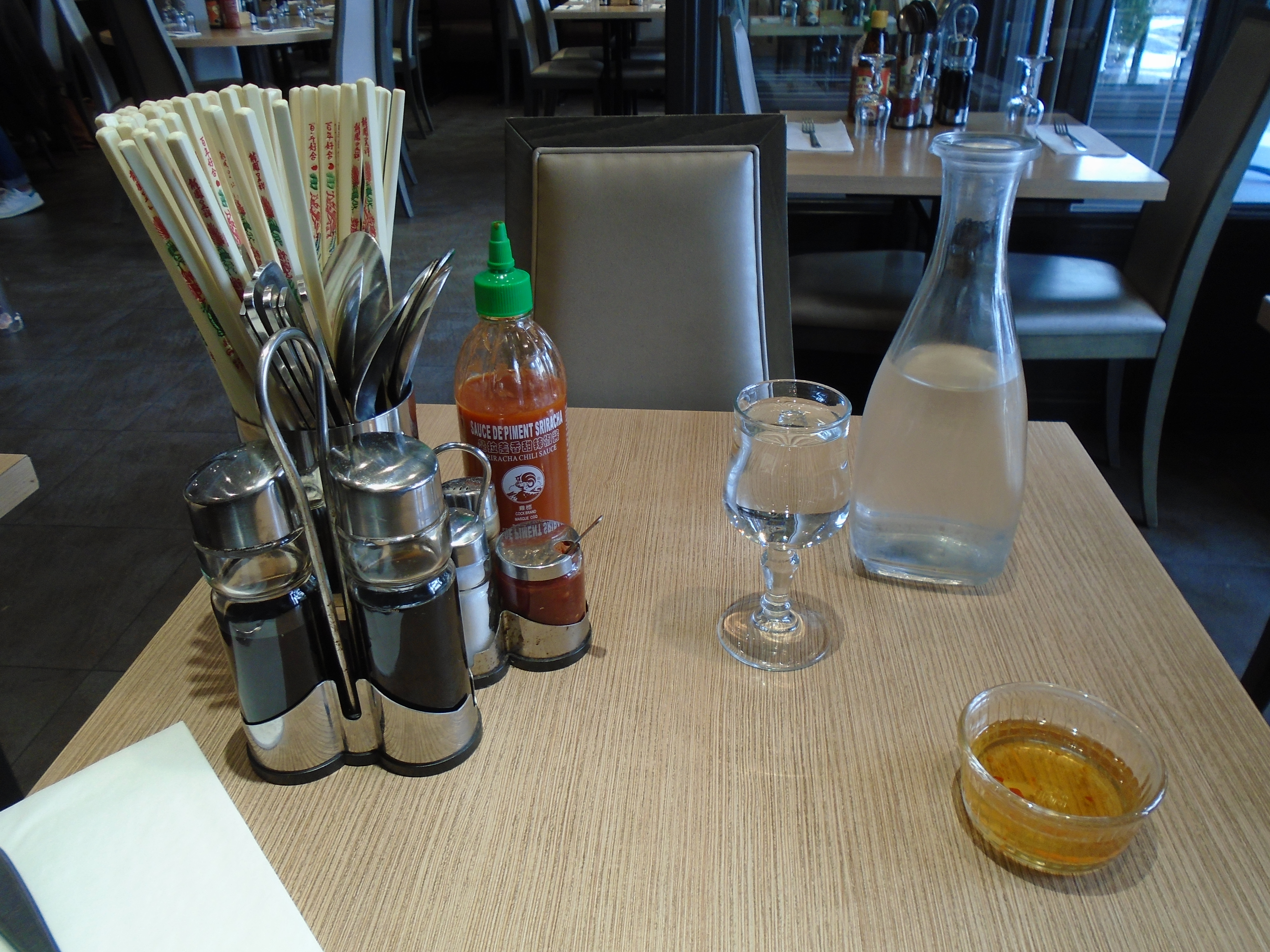
A number of Vietnamese condiments including nước mắm

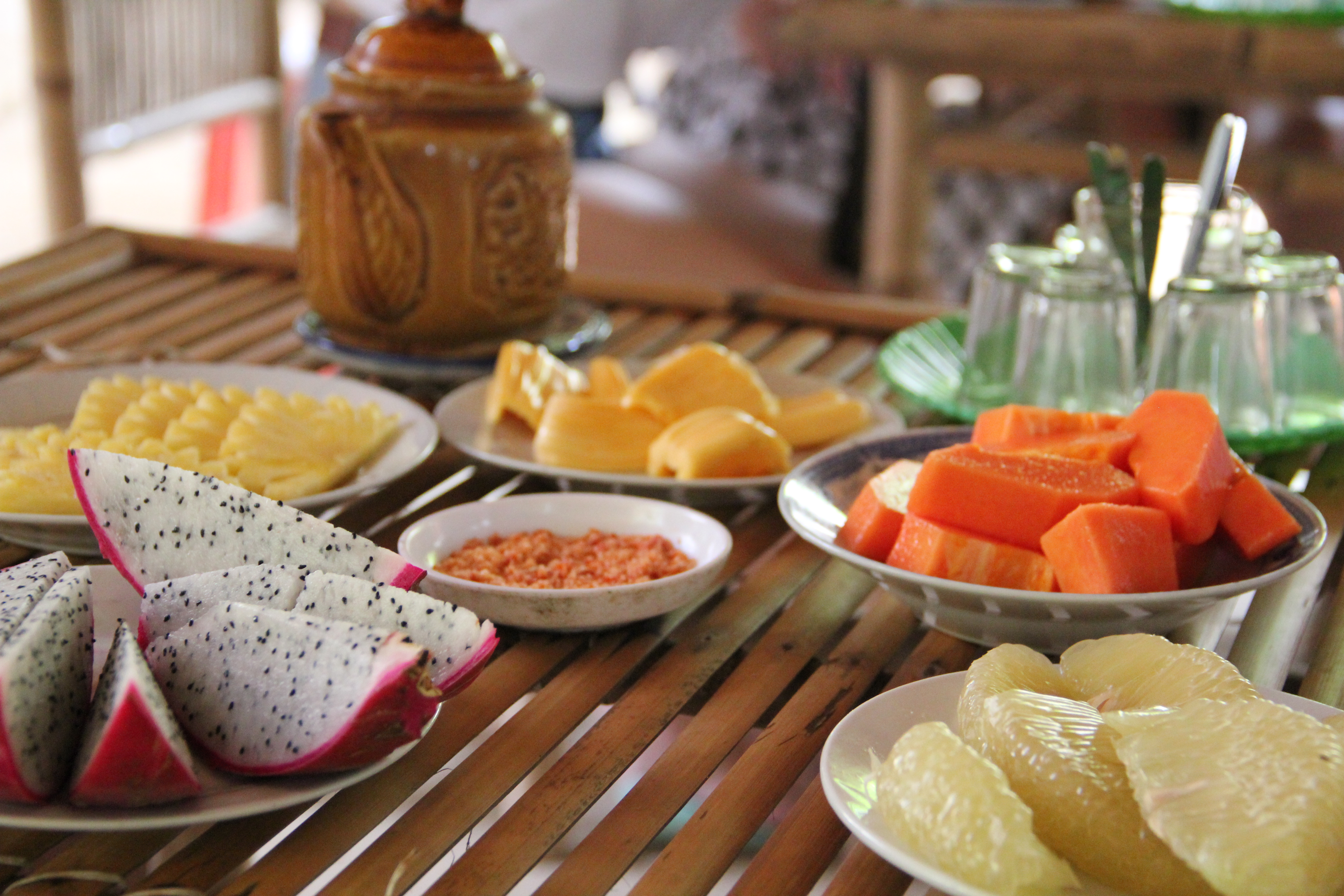
A variety of Vietnamese fruits

Vietnamese cuisine is reflective of the Vietnamese lifestyle, from the preparation to how the food is served. Going through long phases of war and political conflict, as well as cultural shifts, many Vietnamese people have been living in poverty. Therefore, the ingredients for Vietnamese food are often very inexpensive. Nonetheless, the way they are cooked together to create a yin–yang balance makes the food simple in appearance but rich in flavor.

Because of economic conditions, maximizing the use of ingredients to save money has become a tradition in Vietnamese cooking. In earlier decades, and even nowadays in rural areas, every part of a cow is used, from the muscle meat to the intestines. The higher quality cuts from farmed animals (cows, pigs) would be cooked in stir-fry dishes and soups, while the secondary cuts would be used in blood sausages or for preparing broth. The same goes for vegetables like scallions: the leafy part is diced into small bits which are used to add flavor to the food while the crunchy stalk and roots are replanted.

Nước mắm (fish sauce) is the most commonly used condiment in Vietnamese cooking. It is made from fermented raw fish and is served with most of the Vietnamese dishes. A traditional southern Vietnamese meal usually includes cơm trắng (plain white rice), cá kho tộ (catfish in a clay pot), canh chua cá lóc (sour soup with snakehead fish), and it would be incomplete without fish sauce served as a condiment. Cooking and then serving fish in the same clay pot has been proven to be an ancient tradition.

The foods from each region in Vietnam carry their distinctive and unique characteristics that reflect the geographical and living conditions of the people there. The traditional southern Vietnamese meal is made up of fresh ingredients that the fertile Mekong Delta could provide, such as cá lóc, and a wide range of tropical fruit like mangosteen, mango, and dragon fruit. The southern-style diet includes vegetables, fish and tropical fruits as the main ingredients.

Central Vietnam is the region in which food is prepared with the strongest, boldest flavors. The coastline around the central Vietnam area is known for its salt and fish sauce industries; these two condiments are central to their daily diets.

Northern Vietnamese cuisine has a strong Chinese influence, and its most famous dish is phở. Owing to the notable differences in climate and lifestyles throughout the three main regions of Vietnam, the foods vary. Northern Vietnamese cooking is the least bold and spicy in flavor compared to the foods from central and southern Vietnam.

=== Typical Vietnamese family meal ===
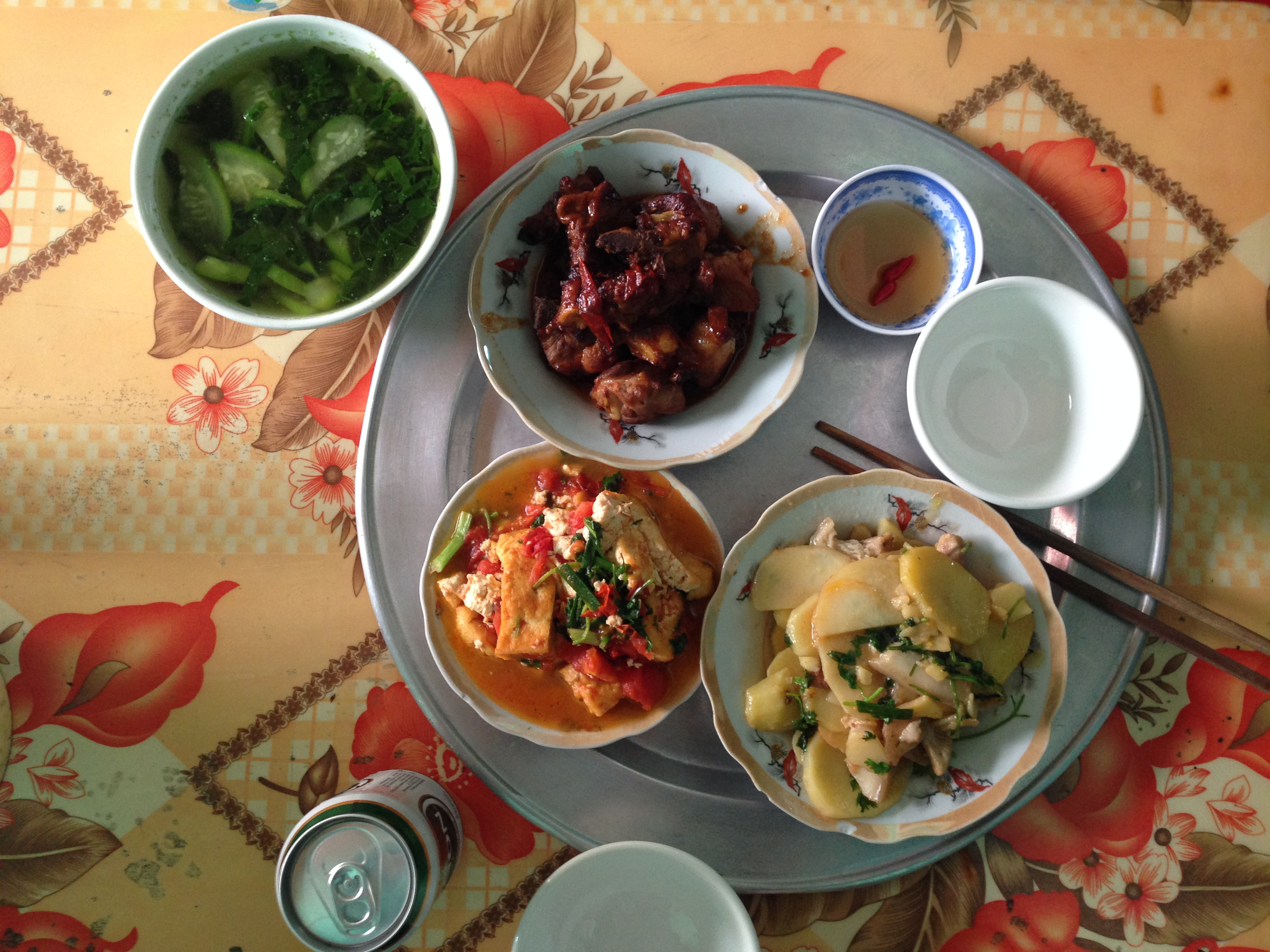
Typical modern Vietnamese family meal served on a round metal tray. Dishes cooked from various native and introduced ingredients which include pork ribs, tofu, potatoes, tomato, gourd, Basella alba and fish sauce with chilli

Daily meals of Vietnamese people are quite different from Vietnamese foods served in restaurants or stalls. A typical meal for the average Vietnamese family would include:

- Cơm trắng: parboiled white rice
- Món mặn or main dishes to eat with rice: fish/seafood, meat, tofu (grilled, boiled, steamed, stewed or stir-fried with vegetables)
- Rau: sauteed, boiled or raw fresh green vegetables
- Canh: (a clear broth with vegetables and often meat or seafood) or other kinds of soup
- Nước chấm: dipping sauces and condiments depending on the main dishes, such as pure fish sauce, ginger fish sauce, tamarind fish sauce, soy sauce, muối tiêu chanh (salt and pepper with lime juice) or muối ớt (salt and chili)
- Small dish of relishes, such as salted eggplant, pickled white cabbage, pickled papaya, pickled garlic or pickled bean sprouts
- Tráng miệng or desserts: fresh fruits, drinks or sweets, such as chè.

Except individual bowls of rice, all dishes are communal and are to be shared in the middle of the table. It is also customary for younger people to ask/wait for the elders to eat first and for the woman who sits directly next to the rice pot to serve rice for other people. People should invite the others to enjoy the meal (somewhat similar to saying "Enjoy your meal"), in order from the elders to younger people. They also pick up food for each other as an action of care.

=== Feast ===
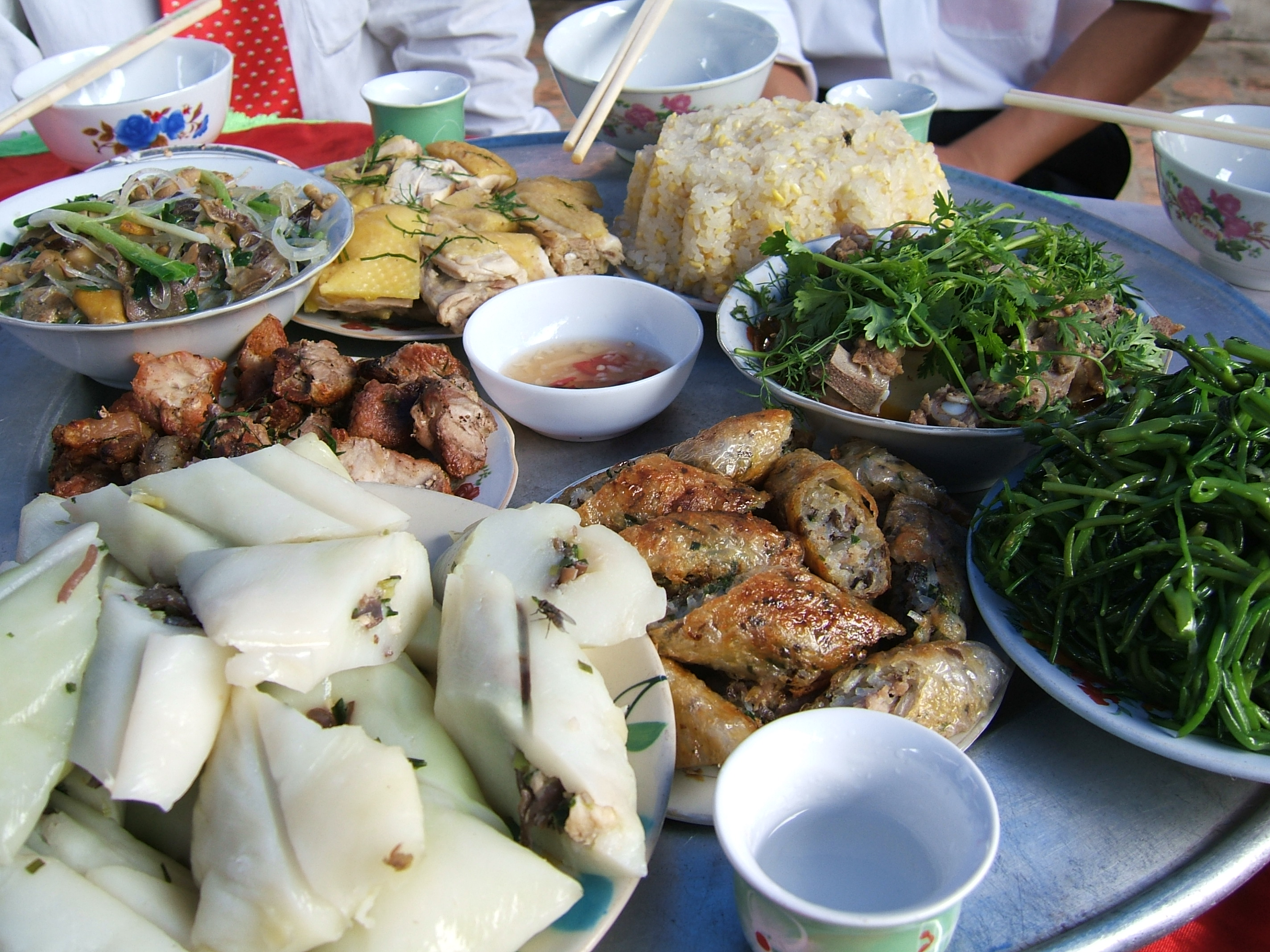
A typical feast for one table (6–8 diners) in an engagement ceremony (Ăn hỏi) of regional Northern Vietnam

A feast (Vietnamese: cỗ, tiệc) is a significant event for families or villages, usually up to twelve people for each table. A feast is prepared for weddings, funerals, and festivals, including the longevity-wishing ceremony. In a feast, ordinary foods are not served, but boiled rice is still used.

A Vietnamese feast has two courses: the main course (món mặn, or salty dish) and dessert (món ngọt, or sweet dish). All dishes, except for individual bowls of rice, are enjoyed collectively. All main course dishes are served simultaneously rather than one after another. The major dish of the main course is placed in the center of the tables, usually big pots of soup or a hot pot.

A basic feast (cỗ một tầng) consists of ten dishes: five in bowls (năm bát): bóng (dried and fried pork skin), miến (cellophane noodles), măng (bamboo shoot), mọc (meatball), chim or gà tần (bird or chicken stew dishes) and five on plates (năm đĩa): giò (Vietnamese sausage), chả, gà or vịt luộc (boiled chicken or duck), nộm (Vietnamese salad) and xào (stir-fried dishes). This kind of feast is traditional and is organized only in northern Vietnam. Other variations are found in central and southern Vietnam.

Four dishes essential in the feast of Tết are chả giò (spring rolls), nem (in northern Vietnam, nem refers to a spring roll called nem cuon or nem ran; in southern Vietnam, nem mainly refer to nem chua, fermented pork rolls), ninh (stew dishes) and mọc (noodle soup). At this time, the feast for offering ancestors includes sticky rice, boiled chicken, Vietnamese rice wine, and other foods preferred by ancestors. Gifts are given before guests leave the feast.

=== Royal cuisine ===
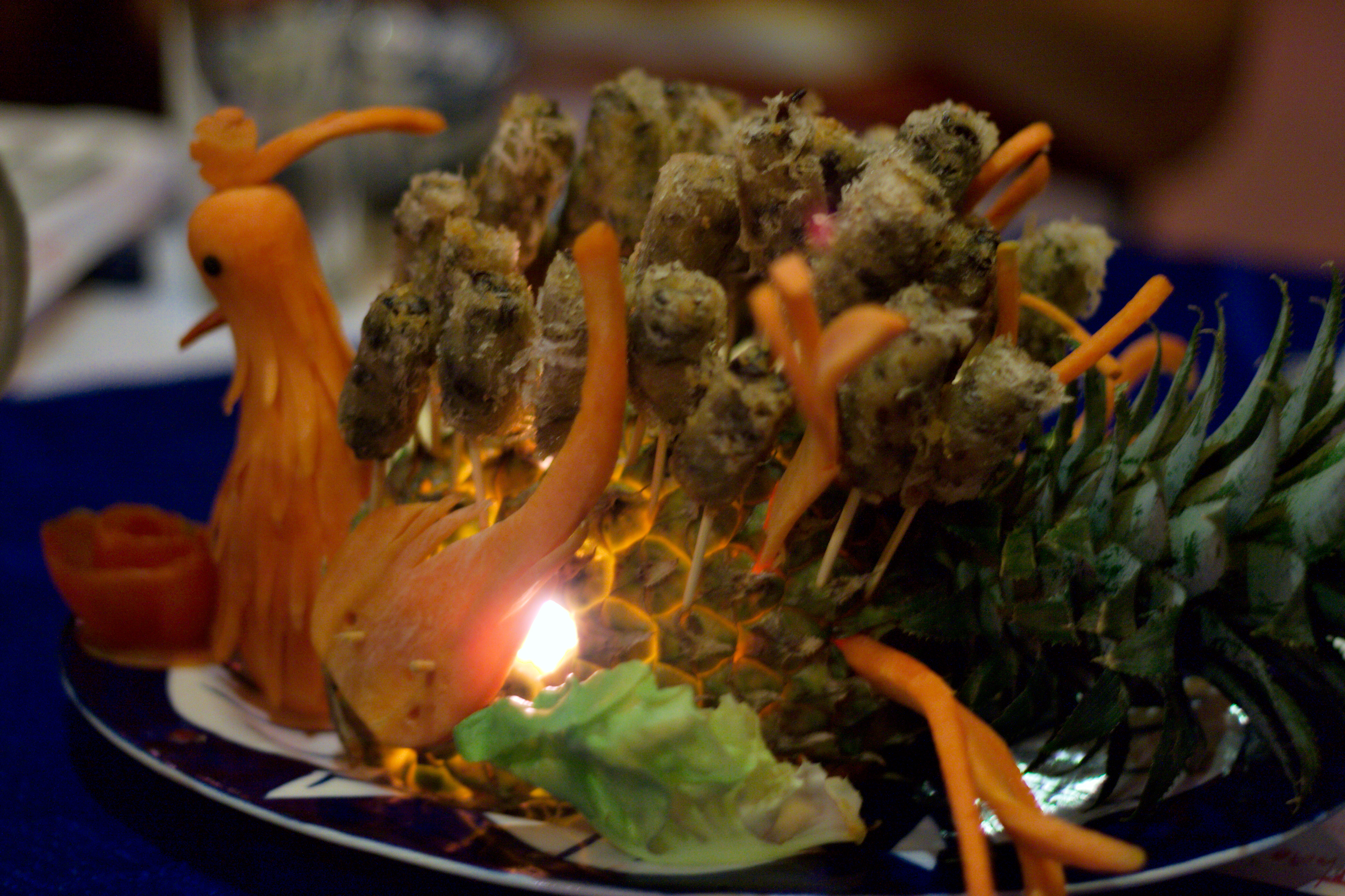
Nem công (peacock spring-rolls) is a well-known royal dish in Huế

In the Nguyễn dynasty, the 50 best chefs from all over the kingdom were selected for the Thượng Thiện board to serve the king. There were three meals per day—12 dishes at breakfast and 66 dishes for lunch and dinner (including 50 main dishes and 16 sweets). An essential dish was bird's nest soup (tổ yến). Other dishes included shark fin (vi cá), abalone (bào ngư), deer's tendon (gân nai), bears' hands (tay gấu), and rhinoceros' skin (da tê giác). Water had to come from the Hàm Long well, the Báo Quốc pagoda, the Cam Lồ well (near the base of Thúy Vân mountain), or from the source of the Hương River. Rice was the de variety from the An Cựu imperial rice field. Phước Tích clay pots for cooking rice were used only a single time before disposal. No one was allowed to have any contact with the cooked dishes except for the cooks and Thượng Thiện board members. The dishes were first served to eunuchs, then the king's wives, after which they were offered to the king. The king enjoyed meals (ngự thiện) alone in a comfortable, music-filled space.

== Cultural importance ==
Salt is used as the connection between the worlds of the living and the dead. Bánh phu thê is used to remind new couples of perfection and harmony at their weddings. Food is often placed at the ancestral altar as an offering to the dead on special occasions (such as Lunar New Year). Cooking and eating play an extremely important role in Vietnamese culture.

=== Proverbs ===
The word ăn (to eat) is included in a great number of proverbs and has a large range of semantic extensions.

- Ăn trông nồi, ngồi trông hướng ("Checking the status of the rice pot when eating, watch where/what direction you are sitting.") = Be careful of possible faux pas.
- Ăn theo thuở, ở theo thì = living in accordance to one's limit and social circumstance (Eat according to the season; live according to the season).
- Cha ăn mặn, con khát nước ("The father eats salty food, the children go thirsty.") = Bad actions will later bring bad luck/consequences to descendants.
- Nhai kĩ no lâu, cày sâu tốt lúa ("Chewing carefully [makes one] feel full longer, ploughing deep is good for the rice") = Careful execution brings better results than hasty actions.
- Học ăn, học nói, học gói, học mở ("Learning how to eat, how to speak, how to wrap, how to open") = Everything needs to be learned, even the simplest, start from "how to eat" politely.

Many Vietnamese idioms reflect the sex-is-eating mapping:

- Ông ăn chả, bà ăn nem ("He eats meatballs, she eats springrolls") = Both husband and wife are having affairs.
- Chán cơm thèm phở ("Tired of rice, craving noodle soup") = A man gets bored of his wife and finds another girl.
- Ăn bánh trả tiền ("You eat snacks, you pay money") = Pay before having sex with prostitutes. (Long story short, bánh is a metaphor for the prostitute).
- Ăn vụng không biết chùi mép ("Eating on the sly without cleaning your mouth") = Committing adultery but leaving a trace.

== International popularity ==
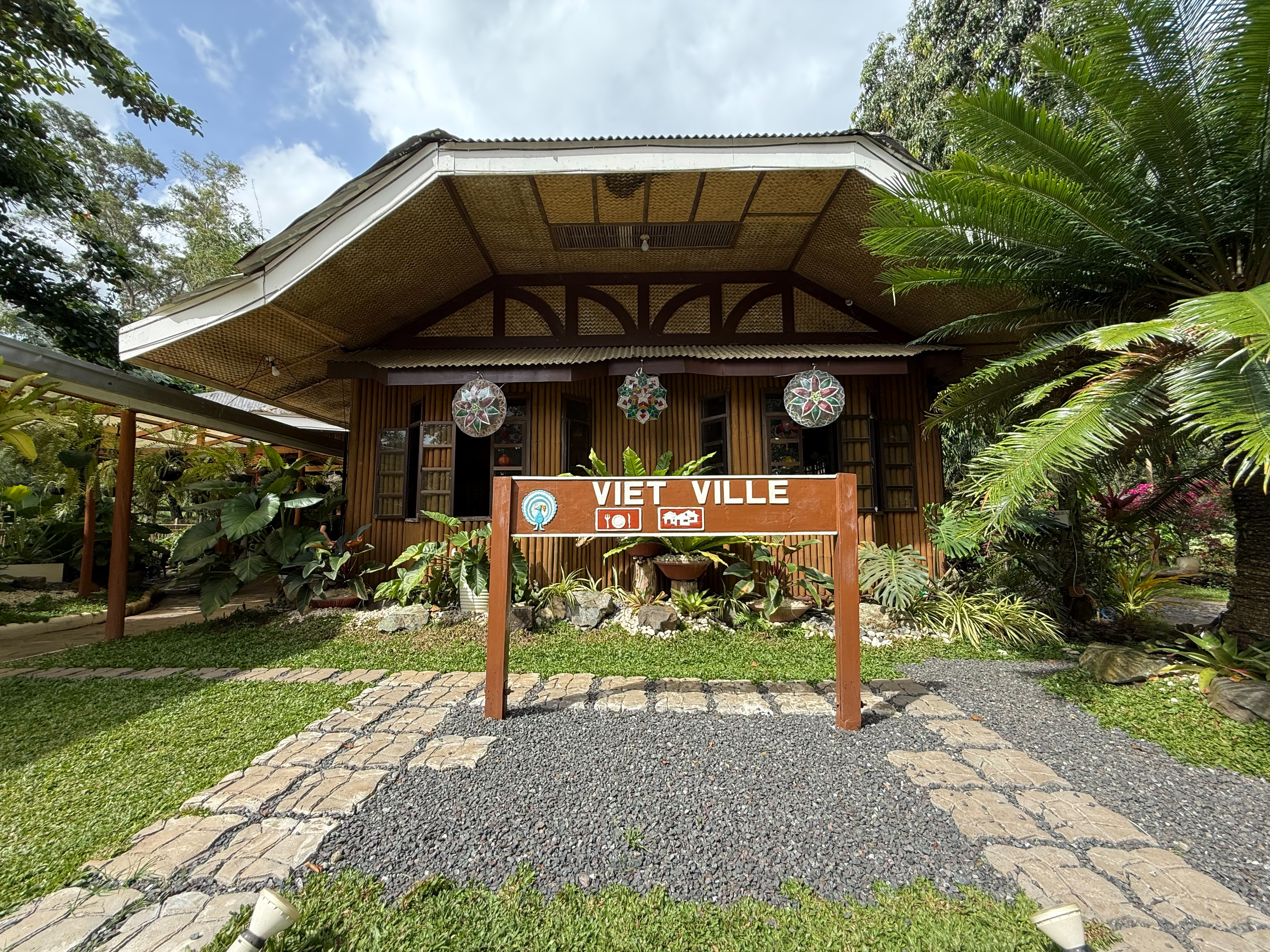
Vietnamese cuisine at a former Vietnamese village in the Philippines

Outside of Vietnam, Vietnamese cuisine is widely available in countries with strong Vietnamese immigrant communities, such as Australia, the United States, Canada, and France. Vietnamese cuisine is also popular in Japan, Korea, the Czech Republic, Slovakia, Germany, United Kingdom, Poland, Philippines and Russia, and in areas with dense Asian populations.

Television shows featuring Vietnamese food have increased in popularity. Luke Nguyen from Australia currently features a television show, Luke Nguyen's Vietnam, dedicated on showcasing and instructing how to cook Vietnamese dishes.

On The Great Food Truck Race, a Vietnamese sandwich truck called Nom Nom Truck received the most money in the first five episodes.

Anthony Bourdain wrote:

You don't have to go looking for great food in Vietnam. Great food finds you. It's everywhere. In restaurants, cafes, little storefronts, in the streets; carried in makeshift portable kitchens on yokes borne by women vendors. Your cyclo-driver will invite you to his home; your guide will want to bring you to his favorite place. Strangers will rush up and offer you a taste of something they're proud of and think you should know about. It's a country filled with proud cooks—and passionate eaters.

Gordon Ramsay visited Vietnam in his reality show Gordon's Great Escape – S02E02 (2011) and fell in love with the taste of the cuisine here. Especially the dish called Hủ tiếu Mì by Mrs. Dì Hai, prepped and served on a small boat in Cái Răng floating market, Cần Thơ. He even praised it as "The greatest dish I have ever eaten" when he brought it up as one of the dishes for the elimination challenge for the top 5 finalists of American MasterChef season 4 episode 21.

In 2024, CNN included phở in its list of the "20 Best Soups in the World," highlighting its rich broth and aromatic spices.

== Cooking techniques ==
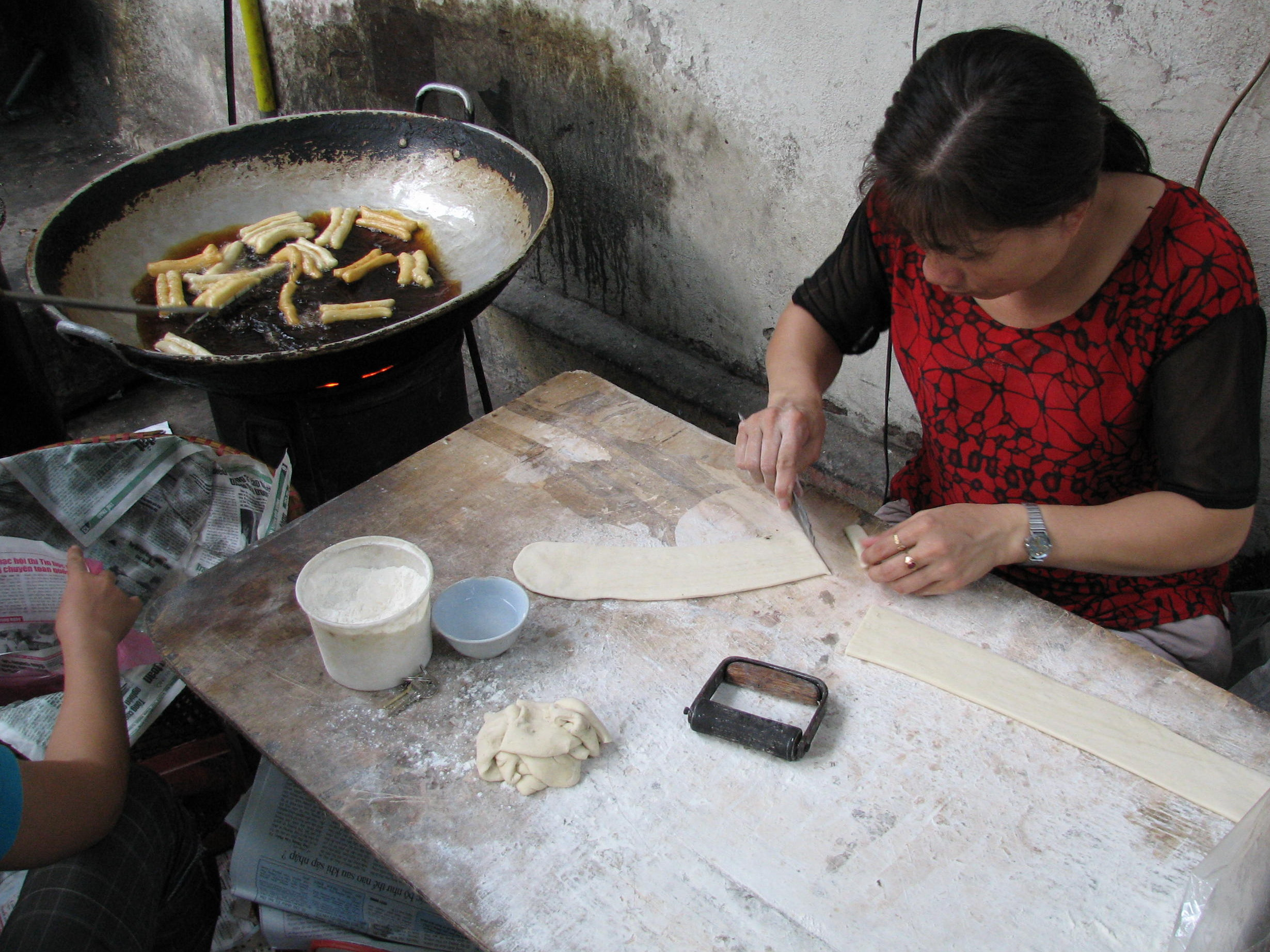
Cutting dough and frying quẩy

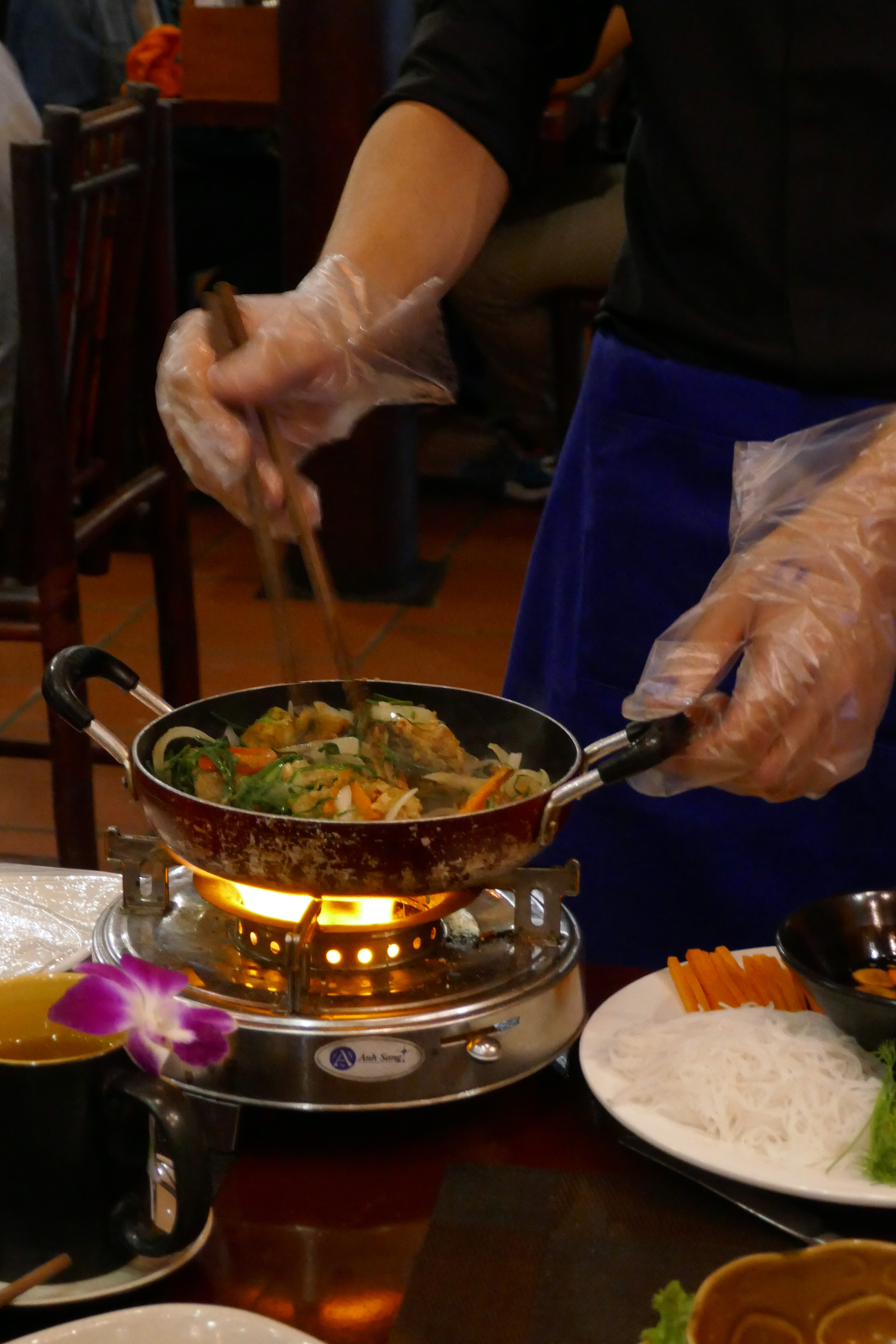
Stir-frying

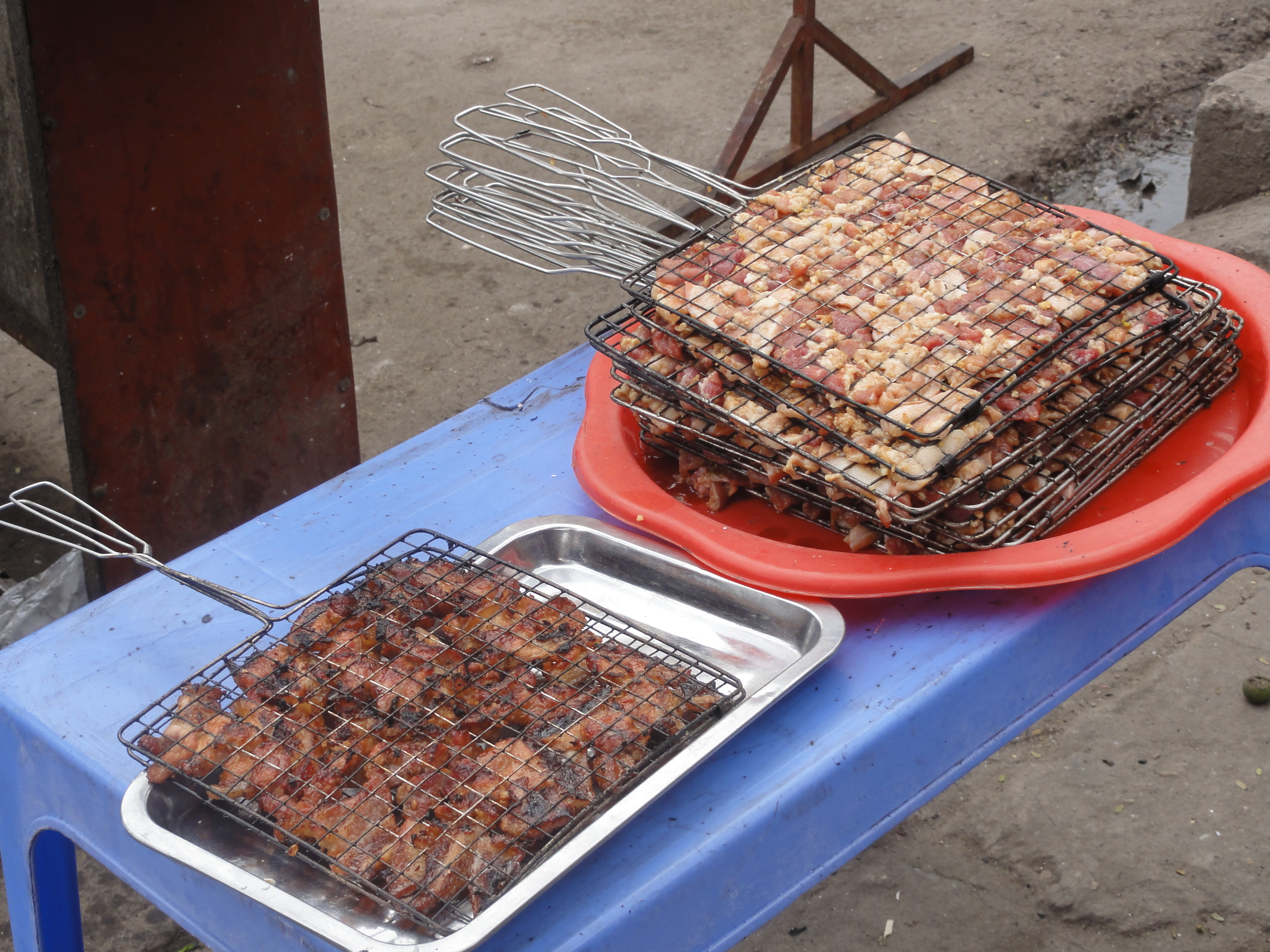
Grilling

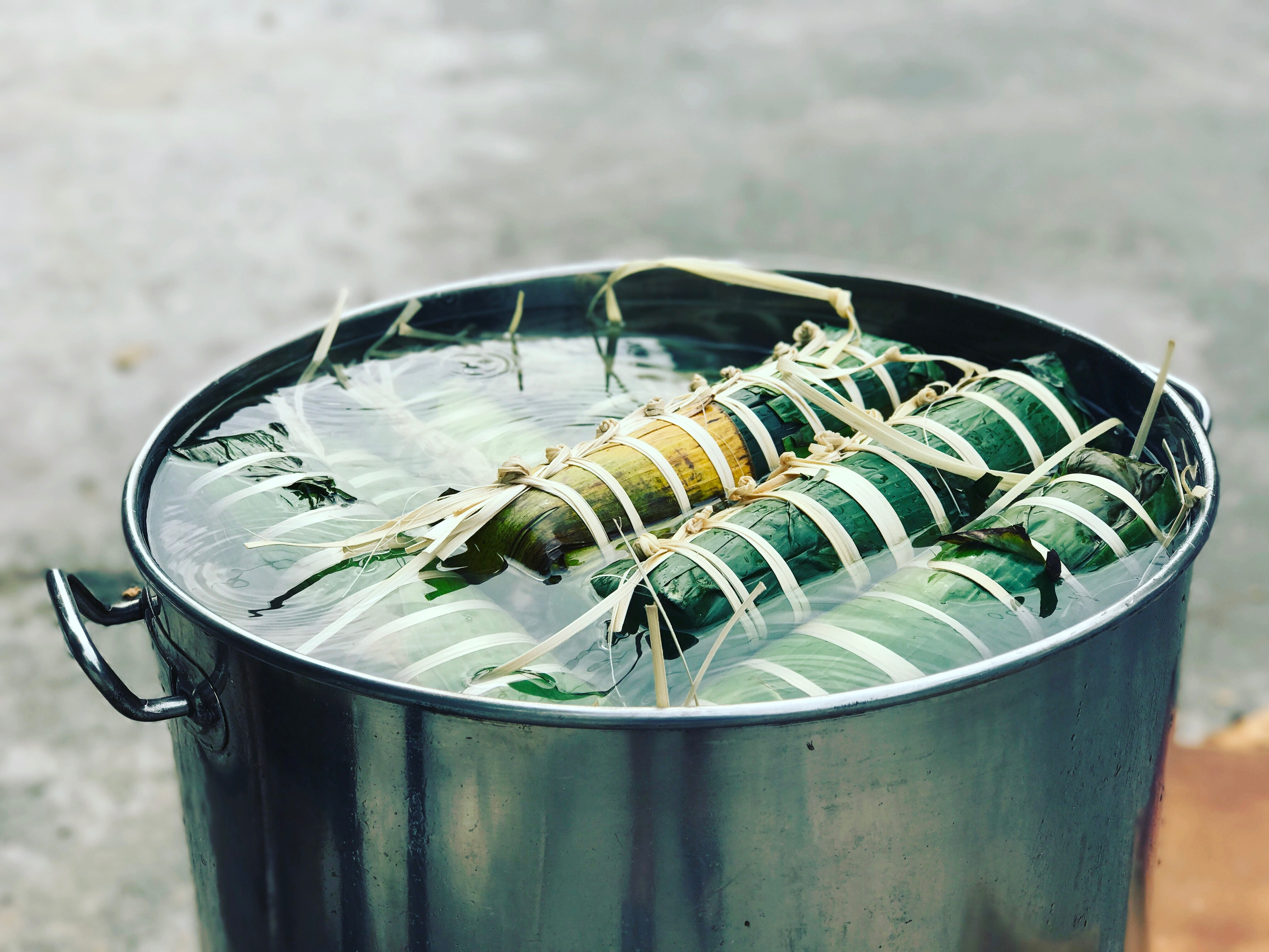
Bánh tẻ, wrapped in leaves and boiled

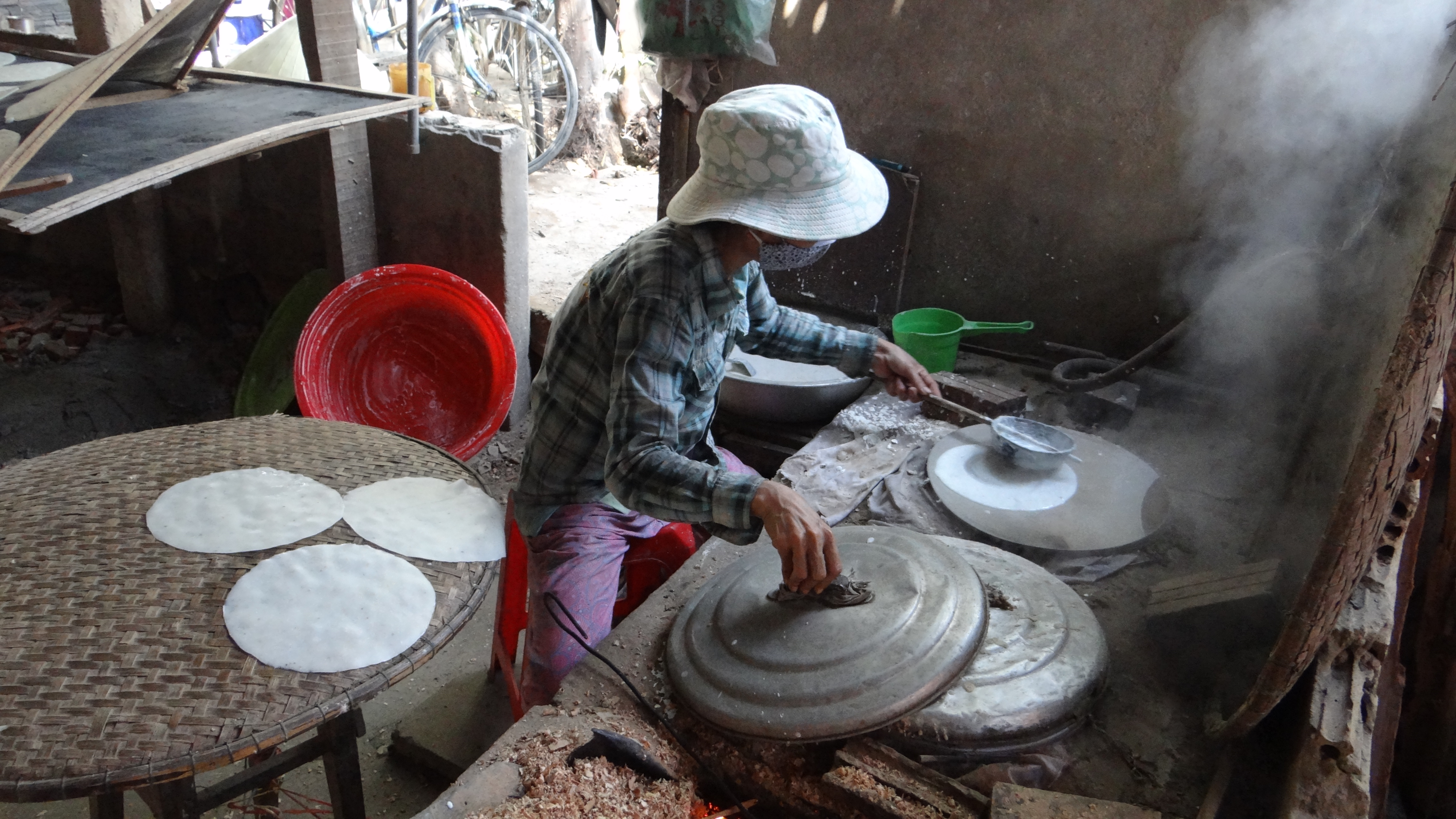
Spread and steamed rice batter found in dishes such as bánh tráng or bánh cuốn

Some common Vietnamese culinary terms include:

- Rán, chiên – fried dishes
  - Chiên nước mắm – fried, then tossed with fish sauce
  - Chiên bột – battered, then deep-fried
- Áp chảo – pan-fried, then sautéed
- Xào – stir-fry, sautéing
  - Xào tỏi – stir-fry with garlic, a very common way of cooking vegetables
  - Xào sả ớt – sautéed with lemongrass and chili pepper
  - Xào lăn – pan-searing or stir-frying quickly to cook raw meat
  - Xáo măng – braised or sautéed with bamboo shoots
- Nhồi thịt – stuffed with minced meat before cooking
- Sốt – saucing
- Kho – stew, braised dishes
  - Kho khô – literally 'dried stew'; cooked until the sauce thickens
  - Kho tiêu/kho gừng/kho riềng – stewed with peppercorns, ginger, galangal
- Hầm/ninh – slow-cook with spices or other ingredients
- Canh/súp – broth-like soup to be served over rice
- Rim – simmering
- Luộc – boiling with water, usually fresh vegetables and meat
- Chần/trụng – blanch
- Hấp – steamed dishes
  - Hấp sả – steamed with lemongrass
  - Hấp Hồng Kông or hấp xì dầu – "Hong Kong-style" steamed dish (for example, with scallion, ginger and soy sauce)
- Om – Northern-style clay pot cooking
  - Om sữa – cooked in a clay pot with milk
  - Om chuối đậu – cooked with young banana and tofu
- Gỏi/nộm – salad dishes, usually with meat, fish
- Gói lá – wrapped raw ingredients in a leaf (often banana) to shape and enhance fragrance
- Nướng – grilled dishes
  - Nướng xiên – skewered dishes
  - Nướng ống tre – cooked in bamboo tubes over fire
  - Nướng mọi/nướng trui/thui – char-grilled over open fire
  - Nướng đất sét/lá chuối – cooked in a clay mould or banana-leaf wrap, or recently, kitchen foil; the method has evolved into nướng giấy bạc
  - Nướng muối ớt – marinated with salt and chili pepper before being grilled
  - Nướng tỏi – marinated with garlic, then grilled
  - Nướng mỡ hành – grilled, then topped with melted lard, peanuts, and chopped green onions
- Bằm/băm – mincing or grinding
- Cháo – congee dishes
- Rô ti – roasting, then simmering meat, usually with strong spices (derived from French word rôtis)
- Tráng – spreading an ingredient into a thin layer on a steamed hot surface
- Cà ri – curry or curry-like dishes
- Quay – roasted dishes
- Lẩu – hot pot dishes
- Nhúng dấm – cooked in a vinegar-based hot pot; some variations include vinegar and coconut water-based hot pot
- Cuốn – any dish featuring bánh tráng rice paper wrappers with bún and fresh herbs
- Bóp thấu/tái chanh – raw meat or seafood prepared with lime or vinegar

== Vietnamese utensils ==
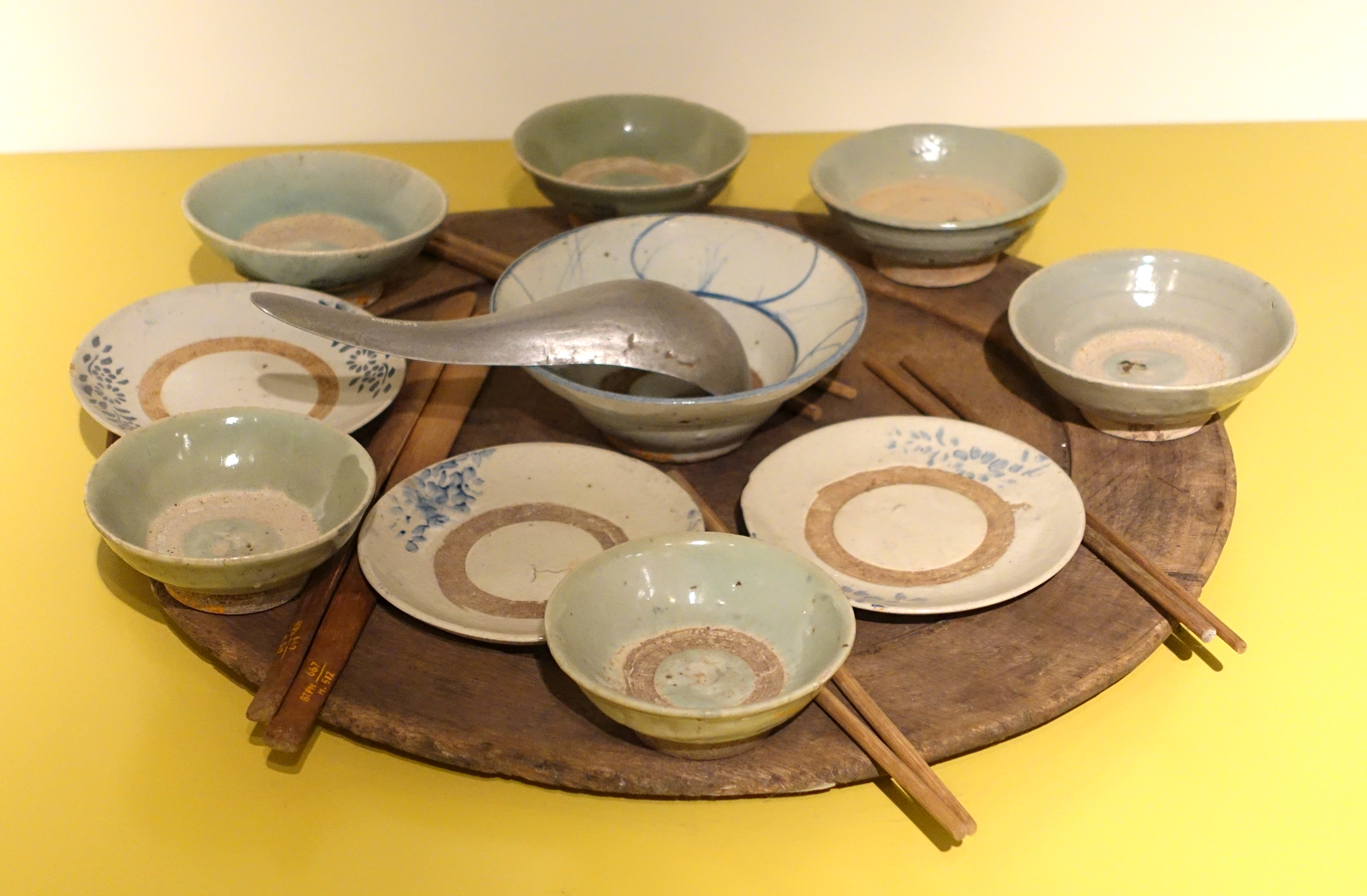
A traditional set of serving utensils used in Northern Vietnam up to the 20th century include: wooden tray, 'small bottom' bowls (bát chiết yêu), stoneware dishes, flat chopsticks (for portioning rice), chopsticks and ladle (for sharing soup)

Basket, various kinds (rổ or rá); Bowl (small bowl: bát in northern Vietnam or chén in southern Vietnam; large bowl: tô); Chopsticks (đũa); Chõ – a kind of steamer to cook glutinous rice; Clay pot cooking (thố đất); cup (cốc or ly); Dipper (gáo); Flat drying basket (nong or nia); Knife (dao)	Mill (cối xay gạo); Mortar (cối giã); Pestle (chày); Plate (dĩa or đĩa); Pot, various kinds (nồi and niêu); Spoon (thìa in northern Vietnam or muỗng in southern Vietnam); Teacup (tách or chén uống trà); Teapot (ấm pha trà); Tray, various kinds (mâm and khay)

== Common ingredients ==
=== Vegetables ===
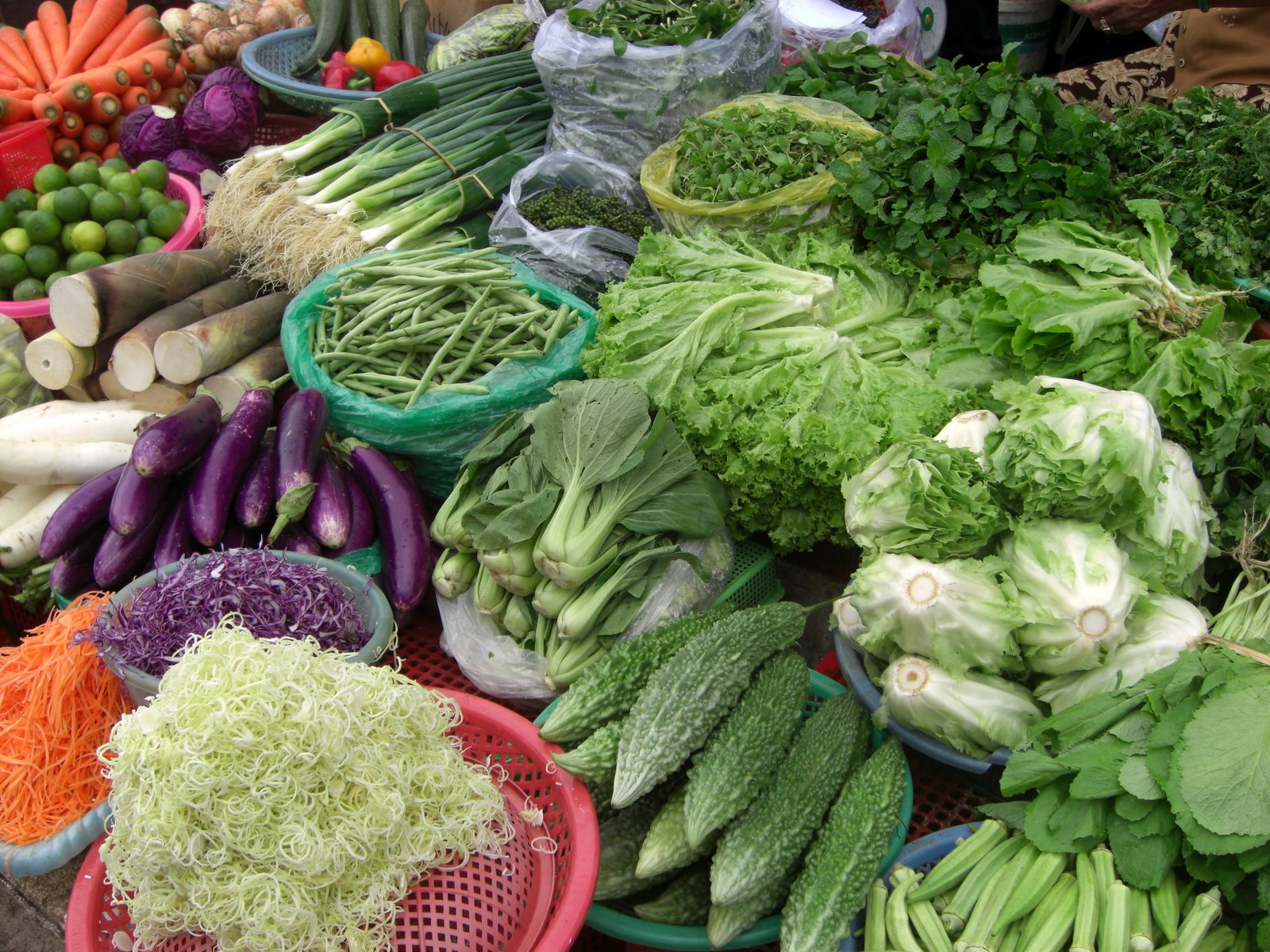
A vegetable stand in a Hanoi market

Bitter melon (khổ qua or mướp đắng) (southern & northern Vietnamese dialects); Bok choy (cải thìa); Cabbage (bắp cải); Carrot (cà rốt); Cauliflower (bông cải or súp lơ); Celery (cần tây); Ceylon spinach (mồng tơi)	Chayote (su su); Chili pepper (ớt); Cucumber (dưa chuột or dưa leo); Crown daisy (cải cúc or tần ô); Radish (củ cải trắng); Eggplant (cà tím); Jicama (củ đậu or củ sắn)	Katuk (rau ngót); Tonkin jasmine (hoa thiên lý); Tricolor amaranth (rau dền đỏ); Water celery (rau cần (ta)); Water cress (xà lách xoang); Water spinach (rau muống)

=== Fruits ===
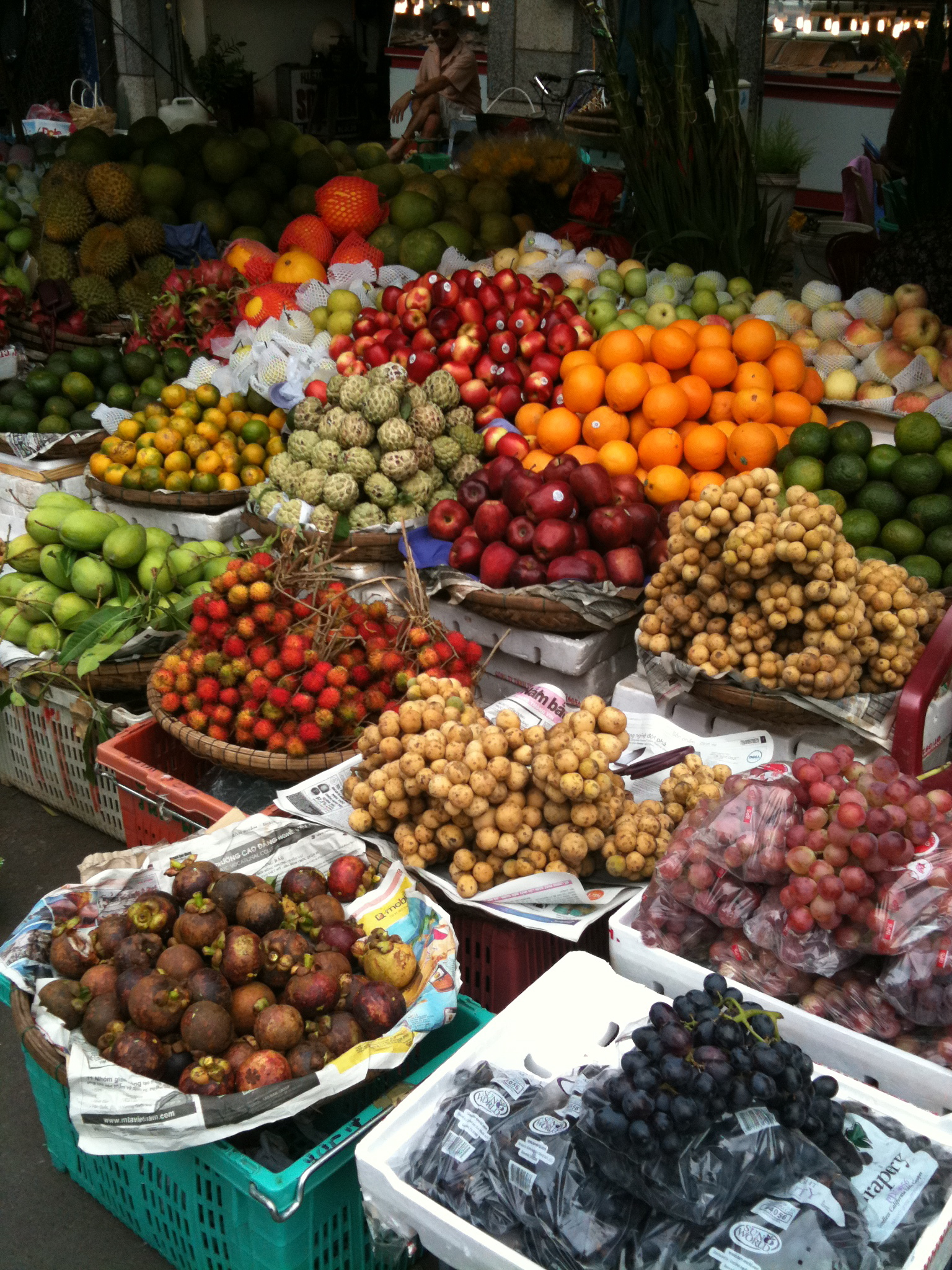
A fruit stand in Da Nang

Acerola (sơ ri or xê-ri); Buddha's hand (phật thủ); Canistel (trái trứng gà); Cherimoya (mãng cầu tây); Coconut (dừa); Chinese date (táo tàu); Custard apple (bình bát or mãng cầu); Dragon fruit (thanh long); Durian (sầu riêng); Milk fruit (vú sữa); Guava (ổi); Jackfruit (mít)	Langsat (bòn bon); Longan (nhãn); Lychee (vải); Mango (xoài); Mangosteen (măng cụt); Otaheite gooseberry (chùm ruột); Papaya (đu đủ); Persimmon (hồng); Plum (mận); Pomelo (bưởi)	Rambutan (chôm chôm); Sapodilla (hồng xiêm or xa-pô-chê); Spondias cytherea (cóc); Soursop (mãng cầu Xiêm or mãng cầu gai); Star fruit (khế); Sweetsop (na or mãng cầu ta); Rose apple (roi in the north, mận Đà Lạt in the south); Tea fruit (thanh trà); Tomato (cà chua); Water apple (roi in the north, mận in the south); Watermelon (dưa hấu)

=== Herbs (rau thơm) ===
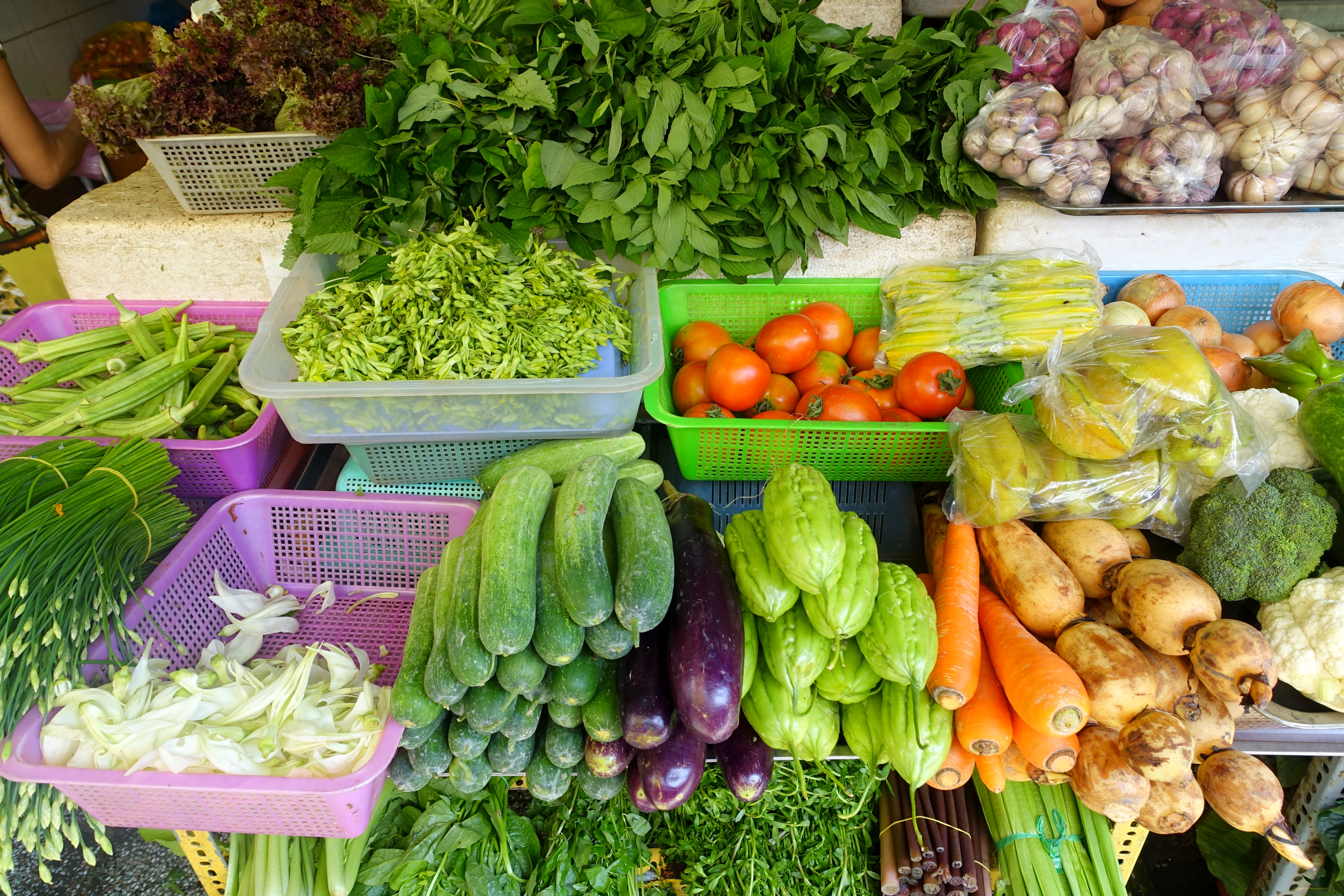
Herbs and vegetables were displayed in Ben Thanh Market

Genus Allium: Using leaf and flower: Welsh onion or green onion (hành lá or hành hương or hành hoa), garlic chives (hẹ); Using bulb: garlic (tỏi), shallot (hành tím), onion (hành tây), Allium chinense (củ kiệu) and chives (củ nén or hành tăm).; Welsh onion (hưng cừ) and leek (tỏi tây or hành boarô) are not traditionally used.; Family Zingiberaceae: using ginger (gừng), galangal (riềng)—greater galangal (riềng nếp) is preferred to lesser galangal (riềng thuốc) because of the stronger flavour, turmeric (nghệ) and black cardamom (thảo quả)	Polygonum aviculare (rau đắng); Coriander leaf (cilantro) (rau mùi or ngò rí); Lemongrass (xả or sả); Dill (thì là); Elsholtzia ciliata (kinh giới); Long coriander/culantro (ngò gai or mùi tàu)	Rice paddy herb (ngò ôm or rau ngổ); Houttuynia cordata (giấp cá or diếp cá); Parsley (mùi tây); Peppermint ((húng) bạc hà); Perilla (tía tô); Spearmint (húng dũi); Thai basil (rau quế or húng quế) sometimes substituted with sweet basil in the United States; Hot mint (rau răm)

== Condiments and sauces ==
=== Condiments ===
Vietnamese usually use raw vegetables, rau sống, or rau ghém (sliced vegetable) as condiments for their dishes to combine properly with each main dish in flavour. Dishes in which rau sống is indispensable are bánh xèo and hot pot. The vegetables principally are herbs and wild edible vegetables gathered from forests and family gardens. Leaves and buds are the most common parts of vegetables used. Most of the vegetables have medicinal value.

Rau sống includes lettuce, raw bean sprout, herbs, shredded banana flower, green banana, water spinach, mango bud and guava leaves.

==== Herbs and spices ====
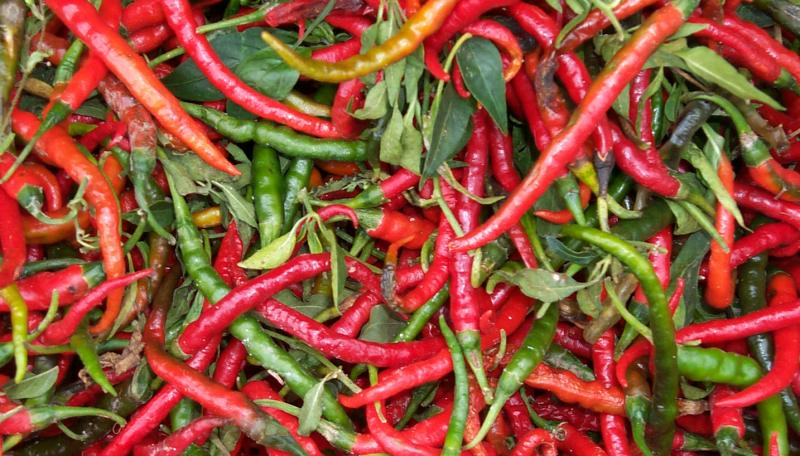
Vietnamese hot chili peppers are added to most foods, especially in central and southern Vietnam.

- Coriander and green onion leaves can be found in most Vietnamese dishes.
- A basic technique of stir-frying vegetable is frying garlic or shallot with oil before putting the vegetable into the pan.
- In northern Vietnam, dishes with fish may be garnished with dill.
- In central Vietnam, the mixture of ground lemongrass and chili pepper is frequently used in dishes with beef.
- In southern Vietnam, coconut water is used in most stew dishes.
- The pair culantro (ngò gai) and rice paddy herb (ngò om or ngổ) is indispensable in all kinds of sour soups in the southern Vietnam.
- Spearmint is often used with strongly fishy dishes.
- Perilla is usually used with crab dishes.

==== Pairing ====
- Chicken dishes are combined with lime leaves.
- Crab and seashell dishes are combined with fishy-smelling herb and perilla.
- Dishes reputed as "cold" or "fishy-smelling", such as catfish, clams, or snails, are combined with ginger or lemongrass.
- Beef dishes are combined with celeries or pineapples.

=== Sauces ===
- Nước chấm
- Mắm tôm (shrimp paste)
- Nước mắm (fish extract) can be used as it is or mixed with lemon juice, garlic, vinegar, sugar, and chili. This mixture is called nước mắm pha.
- Tương is made from fermented soybeans.
- Soy sauce mostly is used in marinades and sauces.
- Hoisin sauce is used in Southern Vietnam to mix with phở while serving.
- Hot chili sauce.

=== Food colourings ===
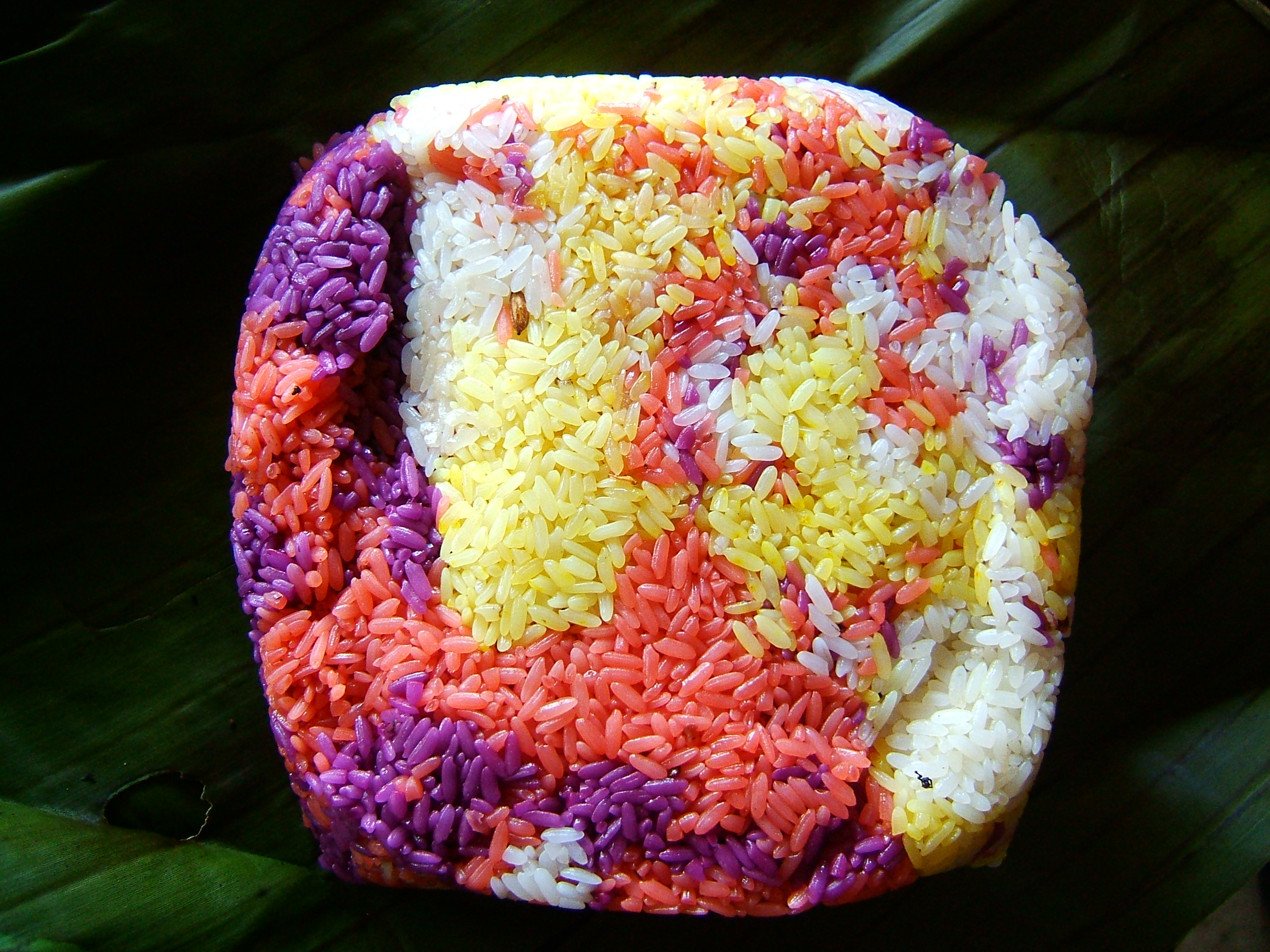
Xôi ngũ sắc (five colours sticky rice) is coloured with plant-based ingredients.

Traditionally, the colouring of Vietnamese food comes from natural ingredients; however, today there is an increase in the use of artificial food dye agents for food colouring, in Vietnam.

- Red – usually from beetroot or by frying annatto seeds to make oil (dầu điều)
- Orange – usually used for sticky rice, comes from gac
- Yellow – from turmeric
- Green – from the pandan leaf or katuk
- Purple – from the magenta plant (lá cẩm)
- Black – in banh gai is from the ramie leaf (lá gai)
- Dark brown – for stew dishes, uses nước màu or nước hàng, which is made by heating sugar to a temperature above that of caramel (170 °C).

Colourings can be absorbed by mixing ground colourings or colouring liquid or wrapping before boiling to get the extracts. When colouring dishes, the tastes and smells of colourings must also be considered.

== Popular dishes ==
When Vietnamese dishes are referred to in English, it is generally by the Vietnamese name without the diacritics. Some dishes have gained descriptive English names, as well.

Popular Vietnamese dishes include:

=== Noodle soups ===
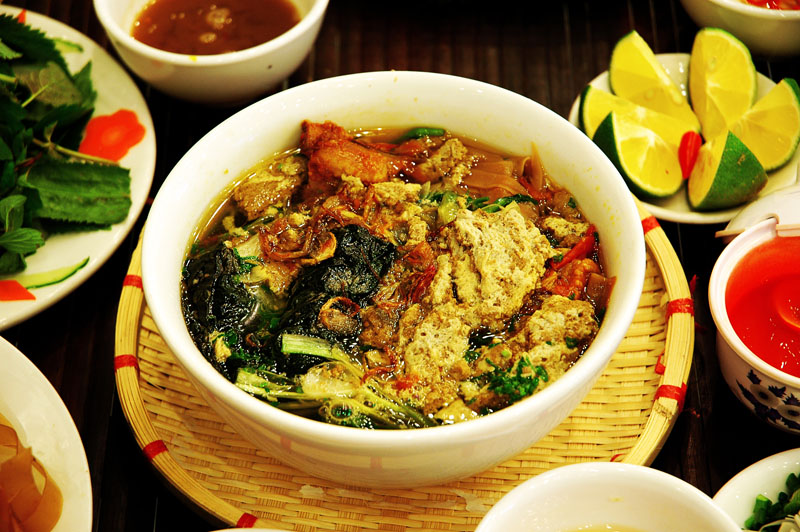
Bánh đa cua (Crab red noodle soup)

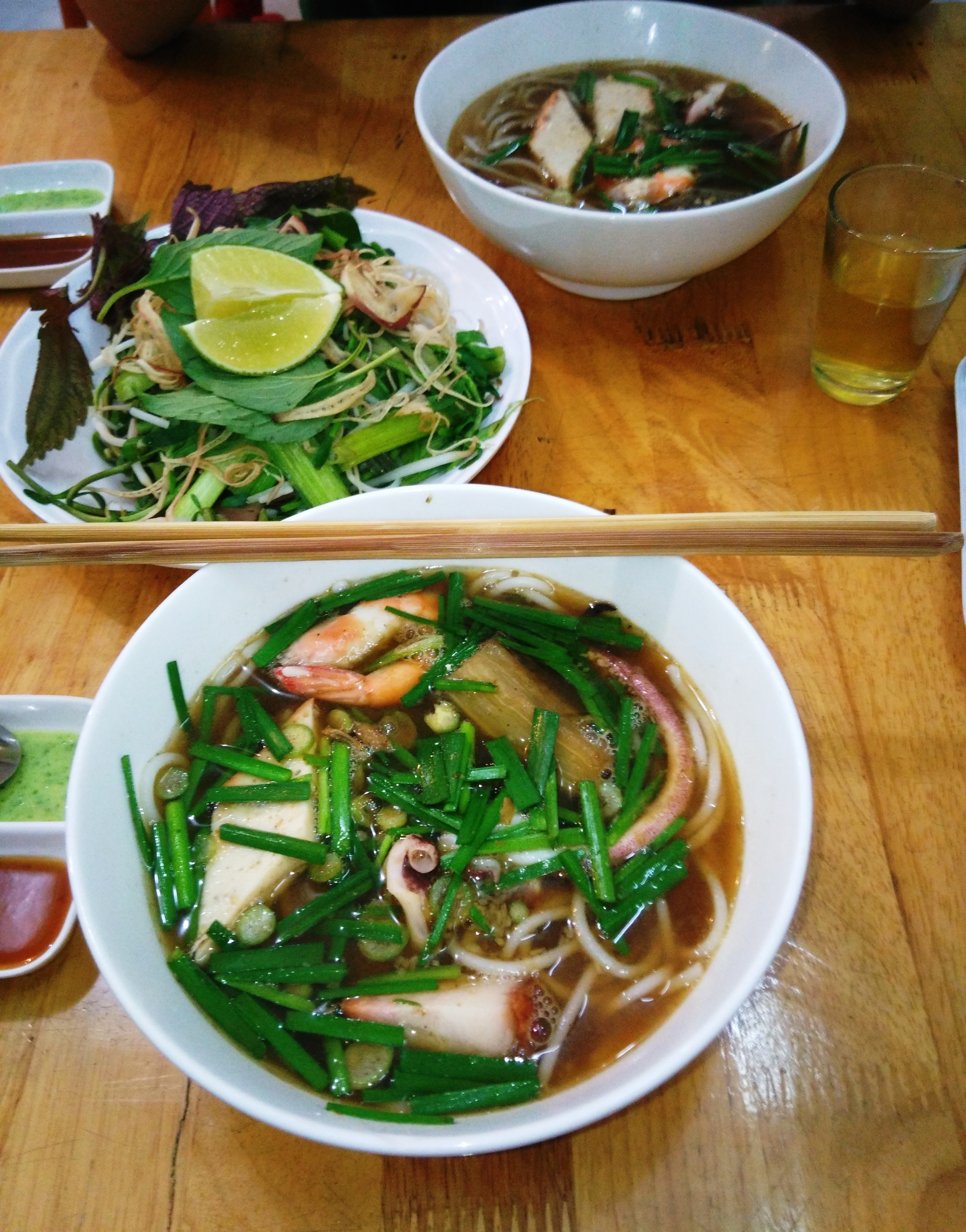
Bún mắm (Mix seafood noodles soup)

Vietnamese cuisine boasts a huge variety of noodle soups, each with distinct influences, origins and flavours. A common characteristic of many of these soups is a rich broth.

Name	Description
Bún bò Huế	Spicy beef noodle soup originated from the royal city of Huế in Central Vietnam. Beef bones, fermented shrimp paste, lemongrass, and dried chilies give the broth its distinctive flavors. Often served with mint leaves, bean sprouts, and lime wedges. Pig's feet are also common ingredients at some restaurants.
Bún măng vịt	Bamboo shoots and duck noodle soup.
Bún ốc	Vermicelli with snails (freshwater snails with noodles, tomato pork bone broth, tofu and herbs)
Bánh canh	A thick tapioca/rice noodle soup with a simple broth, often includes pork, crab, chicken, shrimp, spring onions and fresh onions sprinkled on top
Bún riêu	A noodle soup made of thin rice noodles, topped with crab and shrimp paste, served in a tomato-based broth and garnished with bean sprouts, prawn paste, herb leaves, tamarind/lime, tofu, water spinach, and chunks of tomato
Mì (súp mì)	A Chinese-influenced wheat (egg) noodle soup.
Phở	A noodle soup with a rich, clear broth made from a long boiling of meat and spices, its many varieties are made with different meats (most commonly beef or chicken) along with beef meatballs. Phở is typically served in bowls with spring onion, (in phở tái) slices of semi-cooked beef (to be cooked by the boiling hot broth), and broth. In the south, bean sprouts and various herbs are also added.
Phở satế	Spicy noodle soup with thinly sliced rare beef steak, satế hot chili sauce, sliced cucumber, tomatoes, and peanut
Mì vịt tiềm	Yellow noodle soup with roasted duck and Chinese broccoli
Bún chả cá	Rice vermicelli soup with fried fishcake
Hủ tiếu	A noodle soup with many varied styles, including a 'dry' (not soup, but with sauce) version, which was brought to Vietnam by way of Chinese (Teochew) immigrants from Cambodia. The noodles are usually egg noodles or rice noodles, but many other types may be used. The soup base is made of pork bones.

=== Soup and cháo (congees) ===
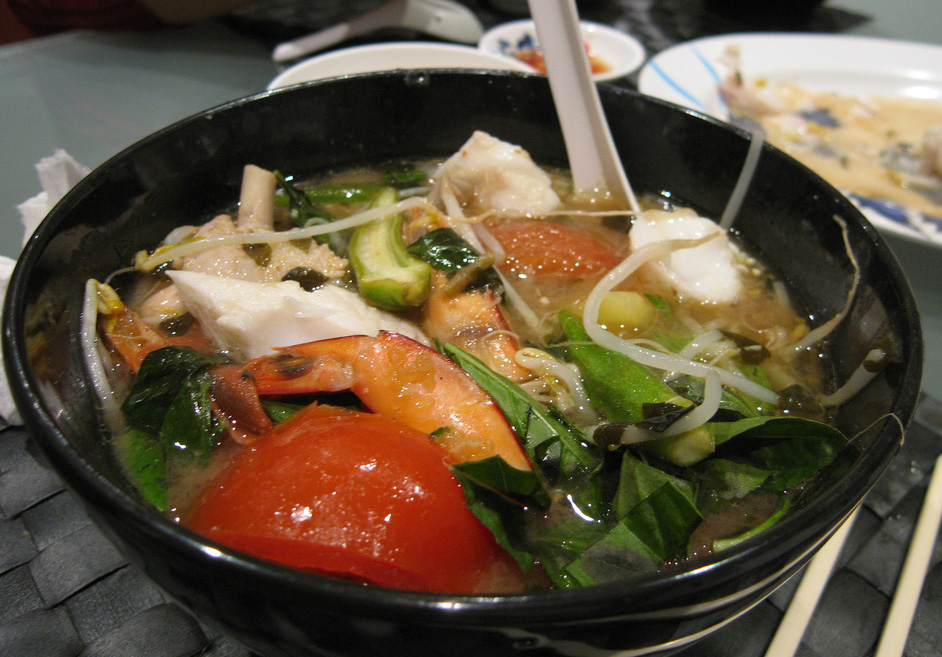
Canh chua, sour soup

Name	Description
Súp măng cua	Asparagus and crab soup typically served as the first dish at banquets
Lẩu (Vietnamese hot pot)	A spicy variation of the Vietnamese sour soup with assorted vegetables, meats, seafood, and spicy herbs
Cháo	A variation of congee, it uses a variety of different broths and meats, including duck, offal, fish, etc. When chicken is used, it is called cháo gà.
Cháo lòng	Rice porridge with pork intestine, liver, gizzard, heart, and kidney
Bò kho	Beef stew with carrots, usually served with toasted bread or rice noodles
Nhúng dấm	Fire pot with a combination of sliced rare beef and seafood cooked in sour broth, served with thin rice vermicelli noodles, fresh vegetables, rice spring roll wrapper, and dipping sauce
Canh chua	Vietnamese sour soup – typically includes fish, pineapples, tomatoes, herbs, beansprouts, tamarind, and various kinds of vegetables

=== Rice dishes ===
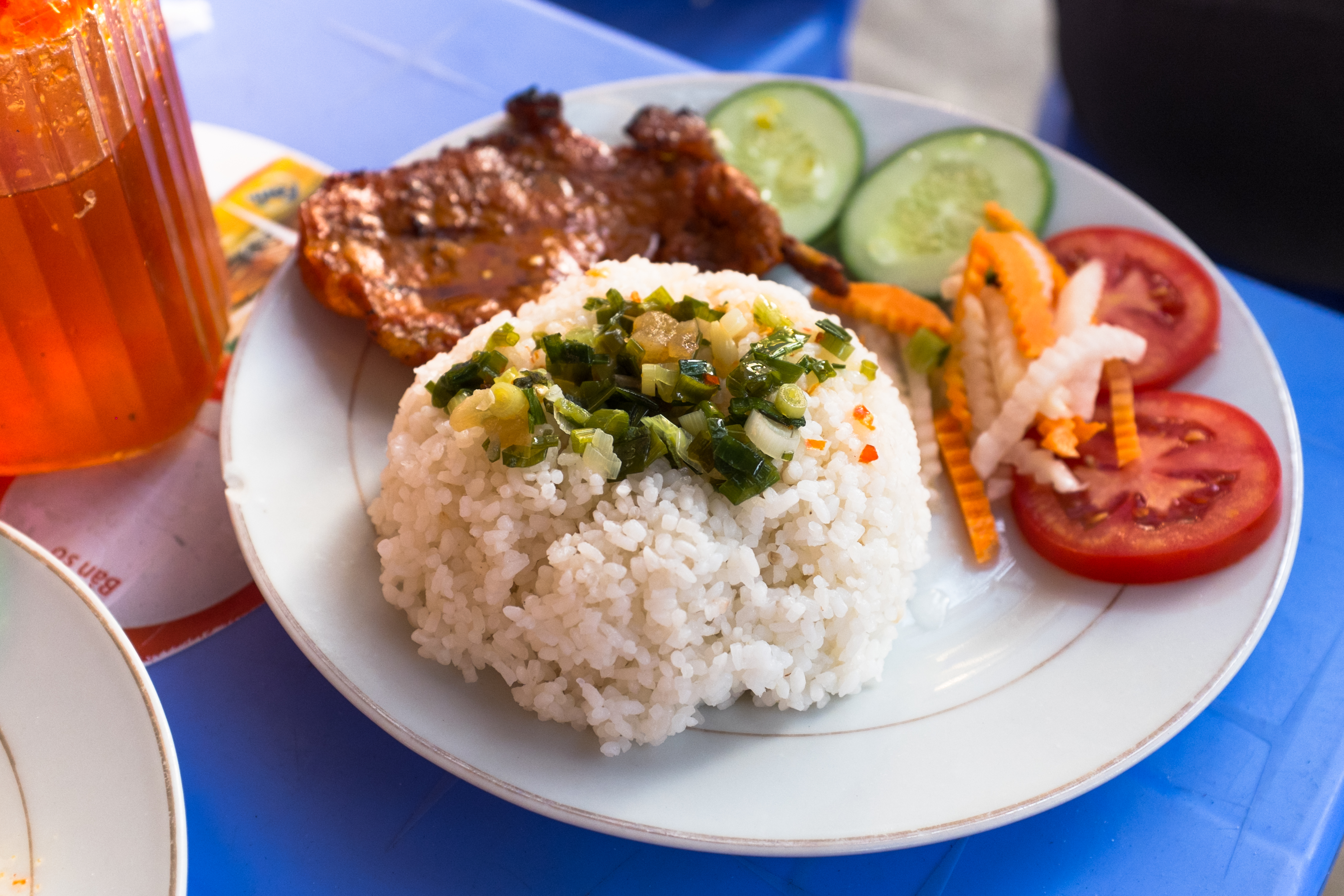
Cơm tấm

Name	Description
Cơm chiên Dương Châu	A Chinese fried rice dish, named after the Yangzhou region in China, it is a well-known dish in Vietnam.
Cơm gà rau thơm (chicken and rice with mint)	This dish is rice cooked in chicken stock and topped with fried then shredded chicken, with mint and other herbs. The rice has a unique texture and taste that the fried mint garnish enhances. It is served with a special herb sauce on the side.
Cơm hến	Rice with clams – a popular, inexpensive dish in the city of Huế and its vicinity
Cơm chiên cá mặn	Fried rice with salty fermented fish and chopped snow pea and chicken
Cá/thịt kho	A traditional family dish of fish or pork braised in a clay pot and served with sweet and sour soup (canh chua)
Gà xào gừng	Chicken sauteed with ginger and fish sauce
Bò lúc lắc	Cubed beef sauteed with cucumber, tomatoes, onion, pepper, and soy sauce
Cơm lam	Rice (often glutinous rice) cooked in a bamboo tube either boiled or steamed
Cơm tấm	In general, grilled pork (either ribs or shredded) is mixed with bì (thinly shredded pork mixed with cooked and thinly shredded pork skin and fried ground rice) over com tam ("broken rice") and is served with sweet and sour fish sauce. Other types of meat, prepared in various ways, may be served with the broken rice. Barbecued beef, pork, or chicken are common choices and are served with the broken rice. The rice and meat are accompanied by various greens and pickled vegetables, along with a prawn paste cake (chả tôm), steamed egg (trứng hấp) and grilled prawns.

=== Sticky rice dishes ===
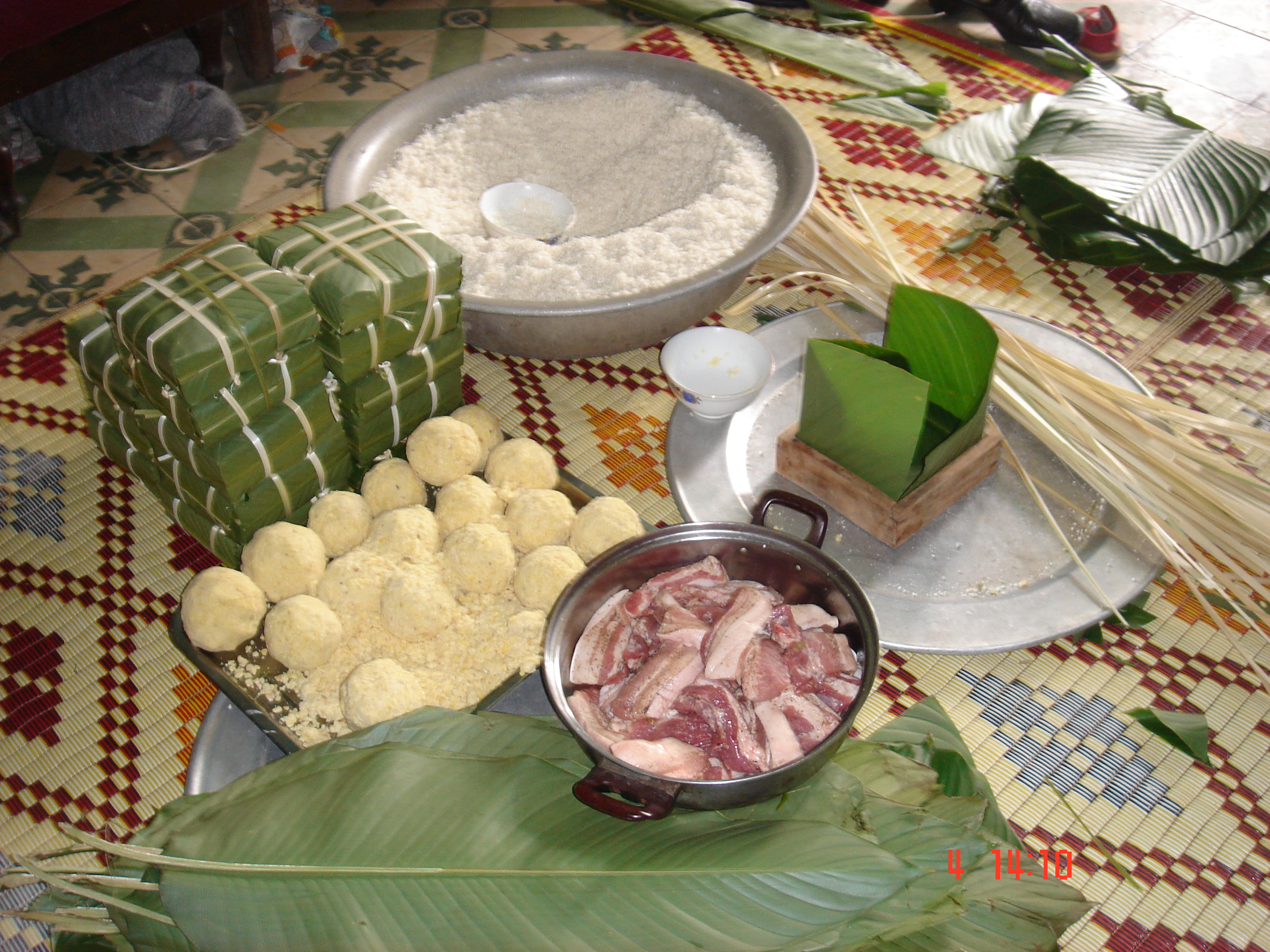
Bánh chưng

Name	Description
Bánh chưng	Sticky rice wrapped in banana leaves and stuffed with mung bean paste, lean pork and black pepper, it is traditionally eaten during the Lunar New Year(Tết). Bánh chưng is popular in the North, while the similar bánh tét is more popular in the South. Bánh tét has the same content, except it is cylindrical in shape, and lean pork is substituted with fatty pork.
Xôi	Sticky rice with coconut milk, cooked the same way as one cooks rice, or steamed for a firmer texture and more flavorful taste, in a number of varieties
Xôi Mặn	A popular Vietnamese street food. Savory sticky rice accompanied with lots of mix-ins, typically lạp xưởng, dried shrimp, chả lụa, pork floss, shittake mushrooms, and topped with soy sauce.

=== Bánh ===
The Vietnamese name for pastries is bánh. Many of the pastries are wrapped in various leaves (bamboo, banana, dong, gai) and boiled or steamed. One of the historic dishes, dating to the mythical founding of the Vietnamese state is bánh chưng. As it is a savory dish and thus not a true pastry, bánh chưng and the accompanying bánh dày are laden with heaven and earth symbolism. These dishes are associated with offerings around the Vietnamese New Year (Tết). Additionally, as a legacy of French colonial rule and influence, bûche de Noël is a popular dessert served during the Christmas season.

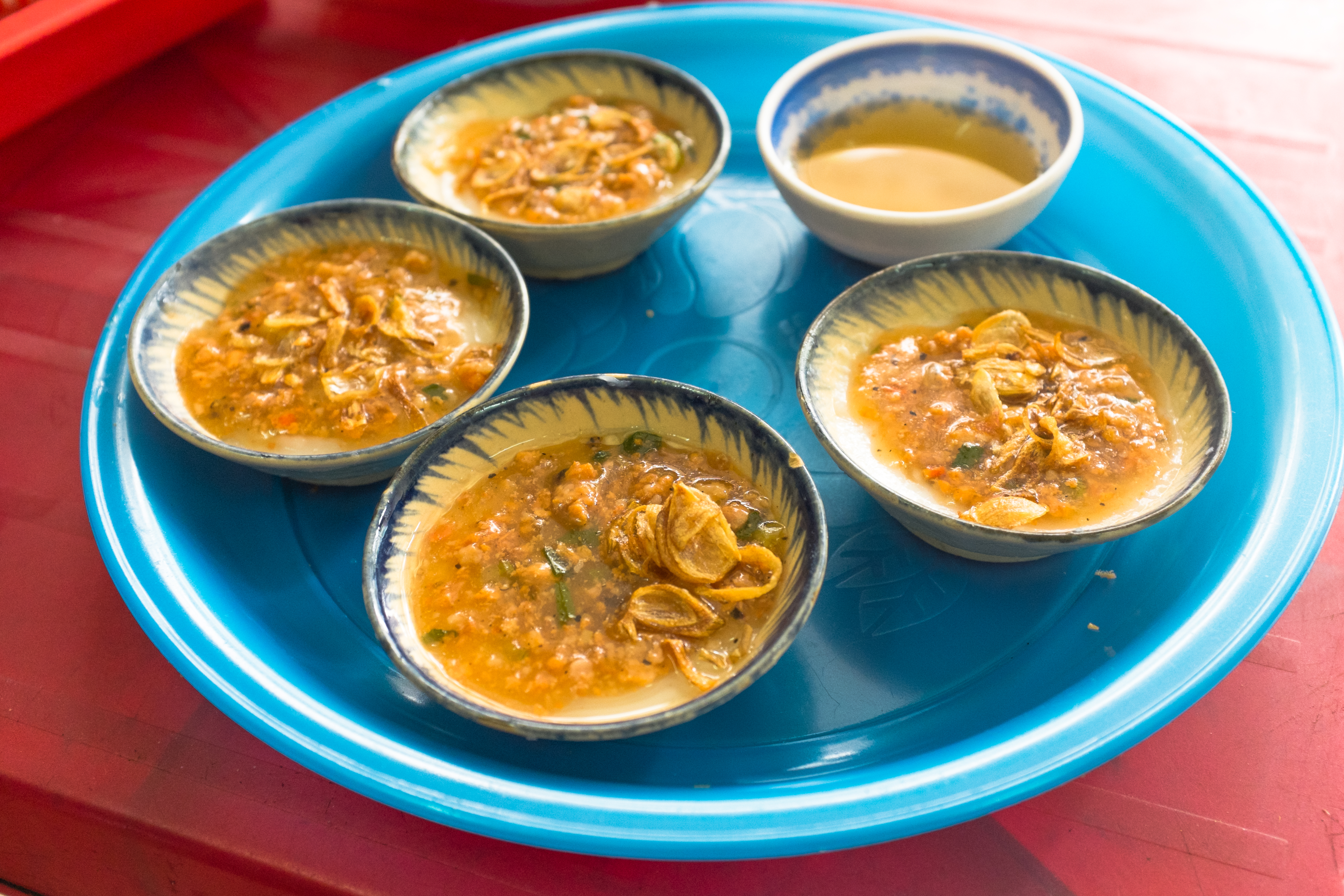
Bánh bèo

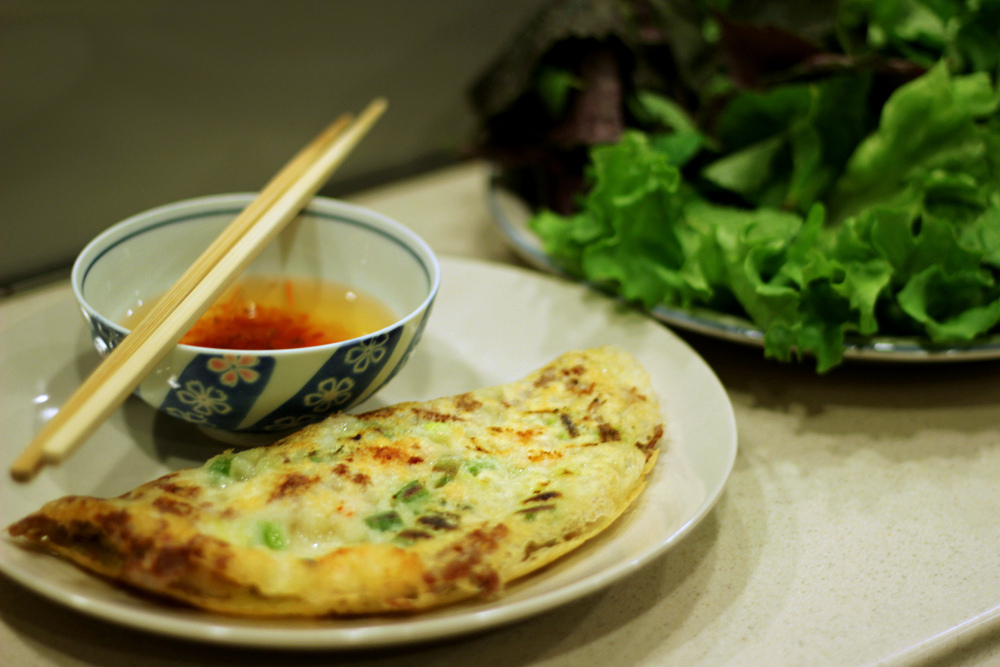
Bánh xèo

Name	
Bánh bao	A steamed bun dumpling that can be stuffed with onion, mushrooms, or vegetables, bánh bao is an adaptation from the Chinese baozi to fit Vietnamese taste. Vegetarian banh bao is popular in Buddhist temples. Typical stuffings include slices of marinated barbecued pork from Chinese cooking, tiny boiled quail eggs, and pork.
Bánh bèo	A central Vietnamese dish, it consists of tiny, round, rice flour pancakes, each served in a similarly shaped dish. They are topped with minced shrimp and other ingredients, such as chives, fried shallots, and pork rinds, eaten with nước chấm.
Bánh bột chiên (fried rice flour dish)	A Chinese-influenced pastry, it exists in many versions all over Asia; the Vietnamese version features a special tangy soy sauce on the side, rice flour cubes with fried eggs (either duck or chicken), and some vegetables. This is a popular after-school snack for young students in southern Vietnam.
Bánh bột lọc	A Huế food, it consists of tiny rice dumplings made in a clear rice-flour batter, often in a small, flattish, tube shape, stuffed with shrimp and ground pork. It is wrapped and cooked inside a banana leaf, served often as Vietnamese hors d'œuvres at more casual buffet-type parties.
Bánh xèo	A flat pan-fried dish made of rice flour with turmeric, shrimp with shells on, slivers of fatty pork, sliced onions, and sometimes button mushrooms, fried in oil, usually coconut oil, which is the most popular oil used in Vietnam. It is eaten with lettuce and various local herbs and dipped in nước chấm or sweet fermented peanut butter sauce. Bánh tráng rice paper wrappers are sometimes used as wrappers to contain banh xeo and the accompanying vegetables.
Bánh nậm	A Huế food, it is a flat steamed rice dumpling made of rice flour, shallots, shrimp, and seasoned with pepper. It is wrapped and cooked in banana leaves and served with fish sauce.

=== Wraps and rolls ===
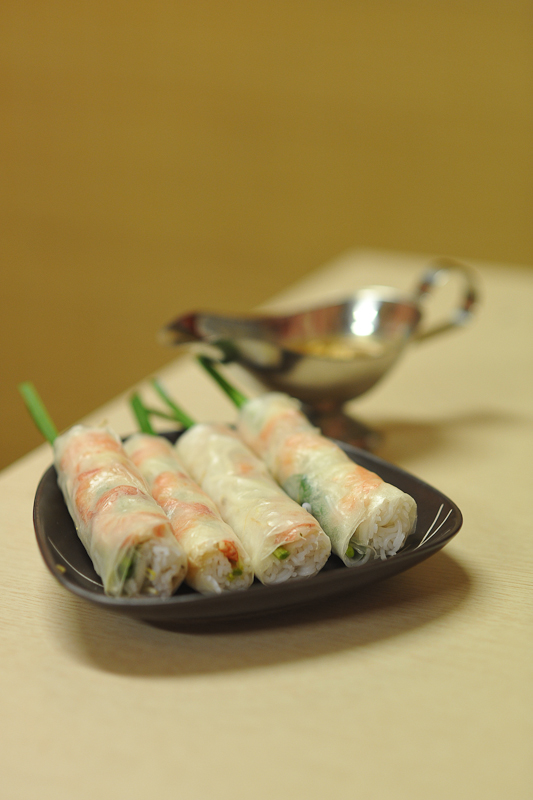
Gỏi cuốn (rice paper roll or summer roll)

Name	Description
Bánh cuốn	Rice flour rolls stuffed with ground pork, prawns, and wood ear mushroom, they are eaten in a variety of ways with many side dishes, including chả (sausage).
Bì cuốn	Rice paper rolls with the bì mixture of thinly shredded pork and thinly shredded pork skin tossed with powdered toasted rice, among other ingredients, along with salad; it is similar to summer rolls.
Bò bía (Vietnamese-style popiah)	Stir-fried jicama and carrots are mixed with Chinese sausage and shredded scrambled eggs, all wrapped in a rice paper roll, dipped into a spicy peanut sauce (with freshly roasted and ground peanuts). It is of Chinese (Hokkien/Chaozhou) origin, having been brought over by the immigrants. In Saigon (particularly in Chợ Lớn), it is common to see old Teochew men or women selling bò bía at their roadside stands. The name bò bía phonetically resembles its original name popiah in the Teochew language.
Chả giò or nem rán (northern)	A kind of spring roll (sometimes referred to as egg roll), it is deep-fried flour rolls filled with pork, yam, crab, shrimp, rice vermicelli, mushrooms ("wood ear") and other ingredients. The spring roll goes by many names – as many people actually use (falsely) the word "spring roll" while referring to the fresh transparent rice paper rolls (discussed below as "summer rolls"), where the rice paper is dipped into water to soften, and then rolled up with various ingredients. Traditionally, these rolls are made with a rice-paper wrapper, but in recent years, Vietnamese chefs outside of Vietnam have changed the recipe to use a wheat-flour wrapper.
Gỏi cuốn	Also known as Vietnamese fresh rolls, salad rolls, or summer rolls, they are rice-paper rolls that often include shrimp, herbs, pork, rice vermicelli, and other ingredients wrapped up and dipped in nước chấm or peanut sauce. Spring rolls almost constitute an entire category of Vietnamese foods, as the many different kinds of spring rolls have different ingredients in them.

Bánh tráng can be understood as either of the following:

- Bánh tráng cuốn

Thin rice flour sheet dried into what is commonly called "rice paper", used in making spring roll (chả giò), and summer rolls (gỏi cuốn) by applying some water to soften the texture

- Bánh tráng nướng (in the south), or bánh đa in the north

These are large, round, flat rice crackers, which, when heated, enlarge into round, easily shattered pieces. They can be eaten separately, although they are most commonly added into the vermicelli noodle dishes like cao lầu and mì quảng. Many types of bánh tráng exist, including the clear sesame seed ones, prawn-like cracker with dried spring onions, and sweet milk.

=== Sandwiches and pastries ===
Name	Description
Bánh mì kẹp thịt	Vietnamese baguette or French bread is traditionally filled with pâté, Vietnamese mayonnaise, cold cuts, jalapeños, pickled white radish, pickled carrot, and cucumber slices. While traditional cold cuts include ham, head cheese, and Vietnamese bologna, varieties of stuffing such as eggs, canned sardines, shredded pork, fried tofu, and grilled meats are common. Sandwiches are often garnished with coriander leaves and black pepper.
Bánh Pâté chaud	A French-inspired meat-filled pastry, it is characterized by flaky crust and either pork or chicken as the filling.
Bánh mì ốp la	Vietnamese-style fried egg sandwich. "Ốp la" means "sunny-side up".

=== Meat dishes ===
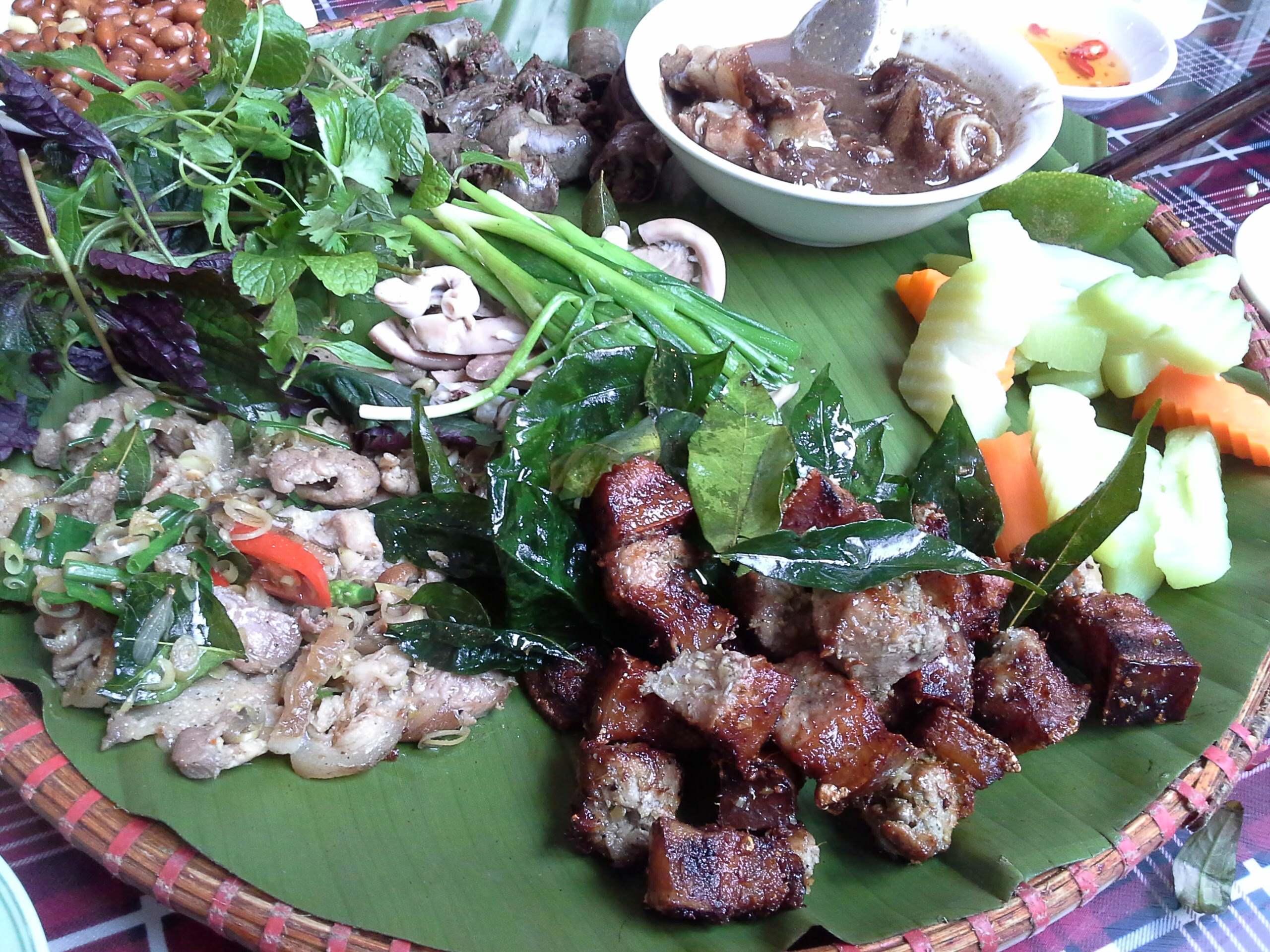
A platter of pork dishes

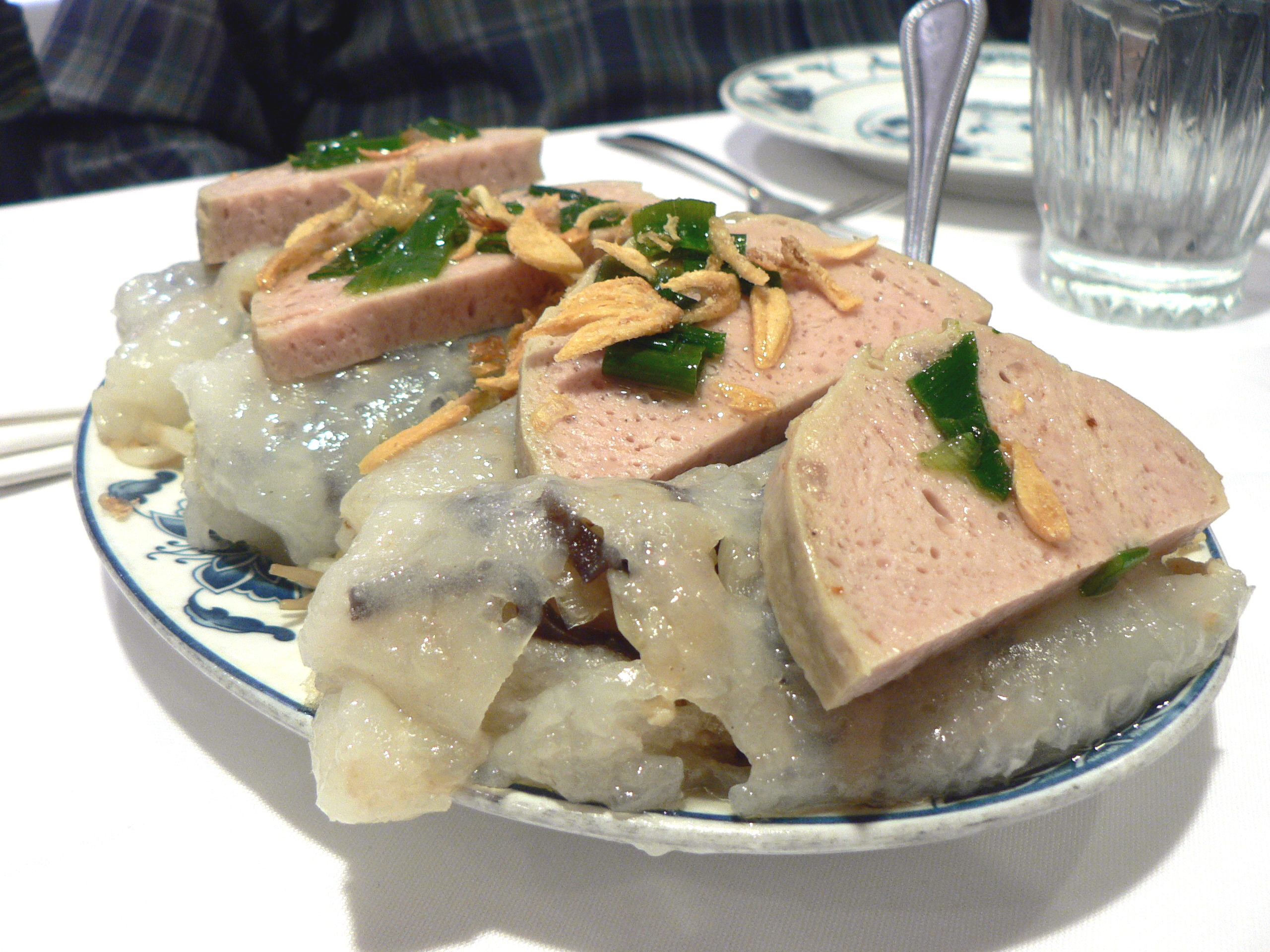
Sliced chả lụa served over bánh cuốn, and garnished with fried shallots

Name	Description
Bò kho (meat soup)	A beef and vegetable stew, it is often cooked with warm, spicy herbs and served very hot with French baguettes for dipping. In northern Vietnam, it is known as bò sốt vang.
Bò lá lốt	A dish of spiced beef rolled in a betel leaf (lá lốt) and grilled
Bò lúc lắc (shaking beef)	French-influenced dish of beef cut into cubes and marinated, served over greens (usually watercress), and sautéed onions and tomatoes, eaten with rice
Bò 7 món (seven courses of beef)	Multi-course meal consisting of seven beef dishes. Developed during the French colonial era when beef became more widely consumed.
Cá 7 món (seven courses of fish)	Similar course arrangement as Bò 7 món substituting beef with fish. Less popular than the original variant.
Chả lụa or giò lụa	A sausage made with ground lean pork and potato starch, it is also available fried; known as chả chiên. Various kinds of chả (sausage) are made of ground chicken (chả gà), ground beef (chả bò), fish (chả cá), or tofu (chả chay, or vegetarian sausage).
Gà nướng sả	Grilled chicken with lemon grass (sả), lemongrass grilled beef and other meats are also popular variations.
Giò thủ	Giò thủ is a brawn made of fresh bacon, pig's ears, garlic, scallions, onions, black fungus, fish sauce and cracked black pepper.
Nem nướng	Grilled meatballs, usually made of seasoned pork, they are often colored reddish with food coloring and with a distinct taste, grilled on skewers like shish kebabs. Ingredients in the marinade include fish sauce.
Nem nguội	A Huế dish and a variation of the Nem nướng meatballs, these also come from central Vietnam. They are chilled, small and rectangular in shape, and stuffed with vermicelli. The reddish meat is covered with peppers and typically a chili pepper. Very spicy, they are eaten almost exclusively as a cocktail snack.

=== Seafood dishes ===
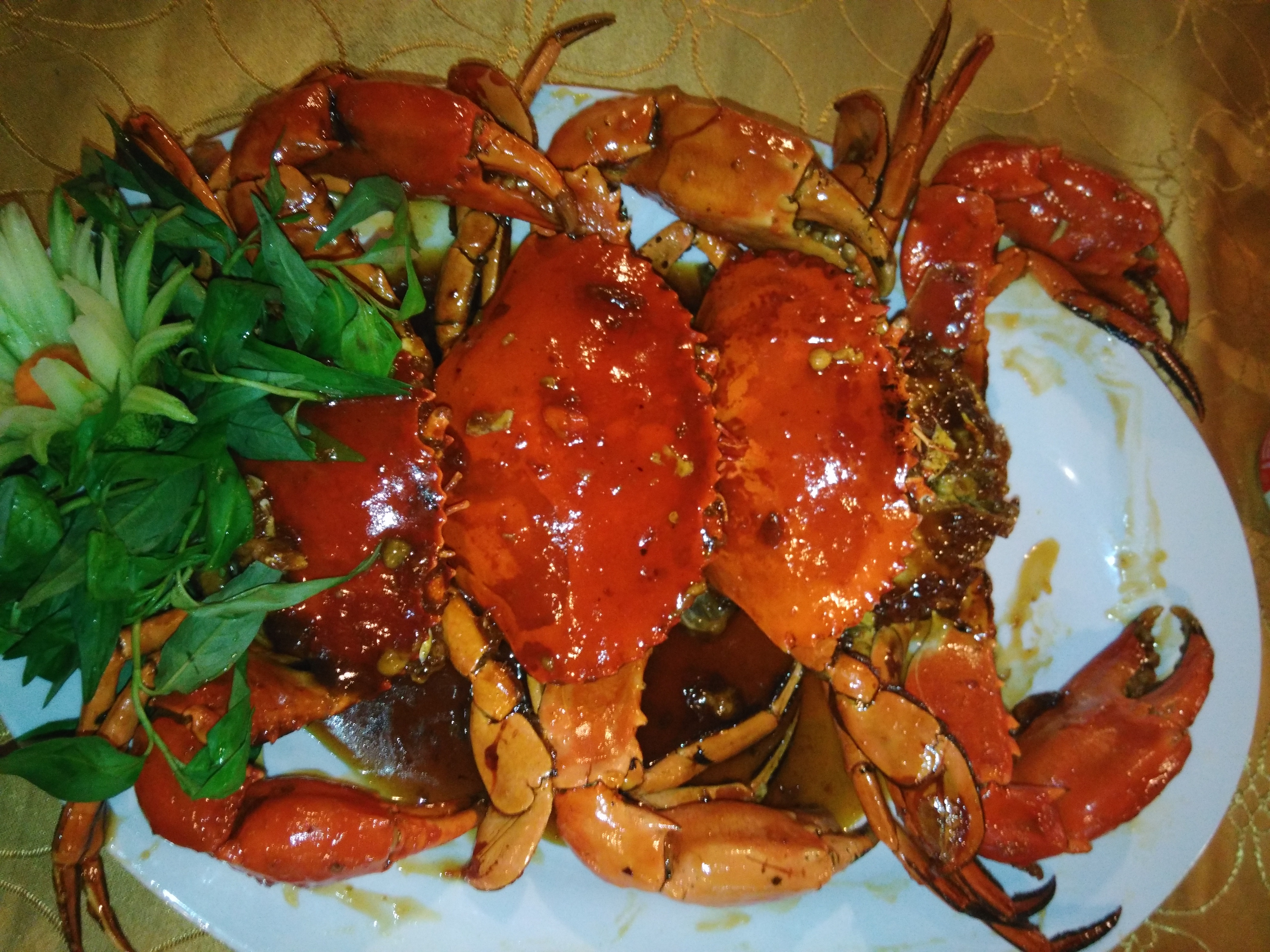
Wok-tossed crabs with tamarind sauce

Name	Description
Bánh Tôm	Prawn and sweet potato fritter
Cá cuốn ho	A roll with fish and spring onions
Cá kho tộ	Caramelized fish in clay pot
Chạo tôm	Prawn paste/cake on sugarcane
Cua rang muối/me	Wok-tossed crab with salt and pepper/tamarind

=== Salads ===
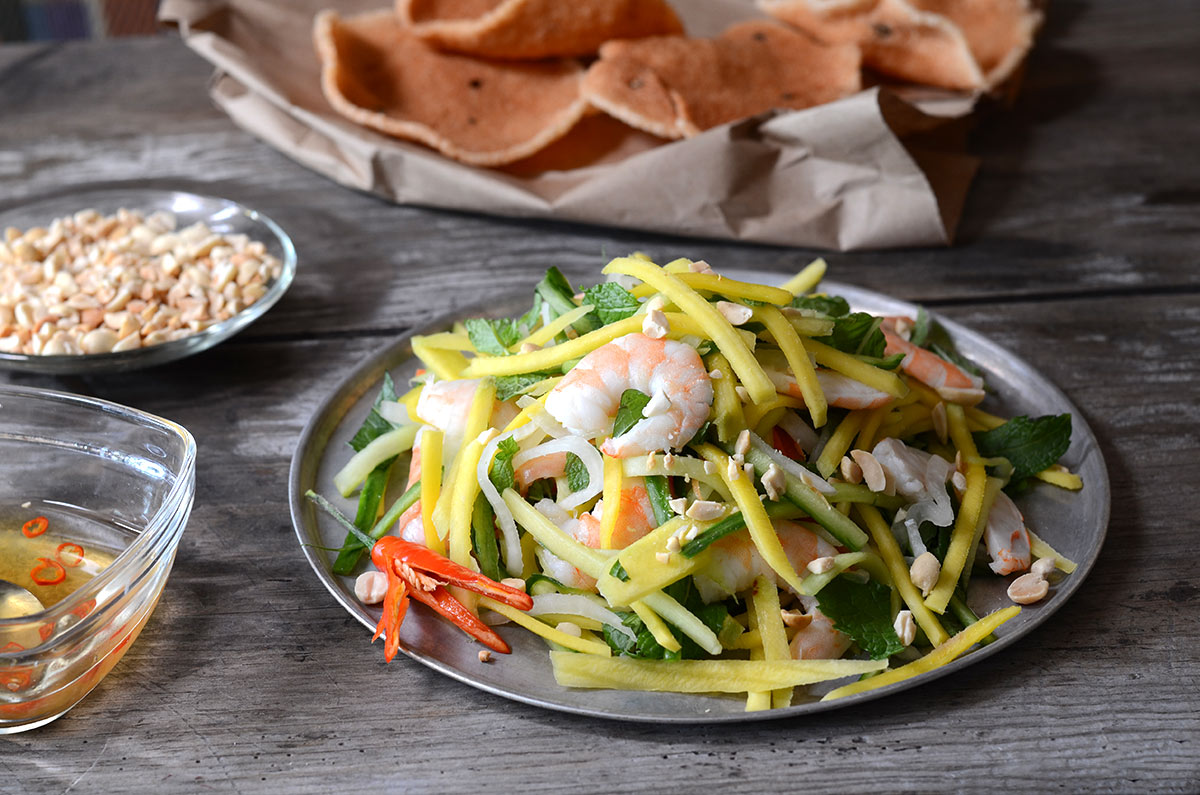
Nộm tôm xoài (Vietnamese mango salad with shrimp)

Nộm (Northern dialects) or Gỏi (Southern dialects) is Vietnamese salad; of the many varieties, the most popular include:

Name	Description
Gỏi đu đủ	Vietnamese papaya salad typically with shredded papaya, herbs, various meats such as shrimp, slices of pork, liver, or jerky, herbs, and with a more vinegar-based rendition of nước chấm
Gỏi Huế rau muống	A salad dish originating from Huế (Central Vietnam), including water spinach (rau muống)
Nộm ngó sen	Lotus stem salad, with shrimp and pork or chicken
Gỏi đậu hủ	Tofu salad with shredded cabbage, mint, and soy dressing
Gỏi nhệch	Rice paddy eel salad with shredded vegetables
Nộm sứa	Jellyfish salad with carrot, cucumber, and sesame dressing
Gỏi chân vịt	Duck feet salad with shredded cabbage and sweet and sour fish sauce
Bò tái chanh	Shredded salad with thinly sliced rare beef, fresh lemon, onion, fried onions, and fish sauce
Gỏi gà bắp cải	Chicken and cabbage salad
Gỏi mít	Young jackfruit salad with peanuts, mint, and fish sauce

=== Curries ===
- Vietnamese curry is also popular, especially in the center and south, owing to the cultural influence of Indian, Khmer and Malay traders.
- Another type of well-known Vietnamese curry is beef brisket curry or oxtail curry. The beef curries are often served with French bread for dipping, or with rice.
- Cà ri gà is a popular Vietnamese curry made with chicken, carrots, sweet potatoes, and peas in a coconut curry sauce. It is also served with rice or baguette.

=== Preserved dishes ===
Muối (literally means salting) and chua (literally means sour or fermenting) are Vietnamese term for preserved dishes. Monsoon tropical climate with abundant rainfall gives the Vietnamese a generous year-round supply of vegetables. Animal husbandry never occurred in large scale in Vietnamese history, therefore, preserved dishes are mainly plant-based pickled dishes. Seafood is often made into a fermented form called mắm like fish sauce.

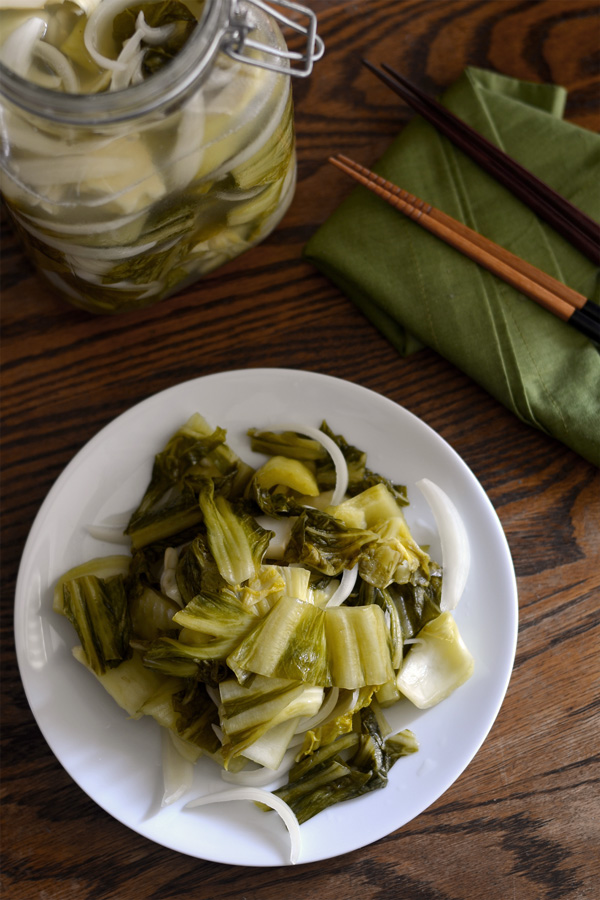
Dưa chua (pickled mustard greens and onion)

Name	Description
Bắp cải muối xổi	Quick-pickled shredded cabbage
Dưa chua, Dưa cải muối chua	Made from a kind of mustard green
Cà pháo muối	Made from Vietnamese eggplant
Dấm tỏi	Pickled garlic cloves in vinegar
Dưa kiệu	Made from Allium chinense, this is a dish of the Tết holiday.
Dưa hành	Made from spring onion bulbs or shallot
Dưa món	Made from carrot, white radish, or green papaya
Măng muối	Made from sliced bamboo shoot with chilies
Ớt ngâm	Pickled chilies in rice vinegar
Rau cần muối xổi	Quick-pickled water celery
Tôm chua	Sweet and spiced pickled shrimp

=== Mắm ===
Mắm is a Vietnamese term for fermented fish, shrimp or other aquatic ingredients. It is used as main course, as an ingredient or as condiment. The types of fish most commonly used to make mắm are anchovies, catfish, snakeheads, and mackerels. The fish flesh remains intact (this is how it is different from nước mắm), and can be eaten cooked or uncooked, with or without vegetables and condiments. Fish sauce is literally called "mắm water" in Vietnamese and is the distilled liquid from the process of fermentation of mắm.

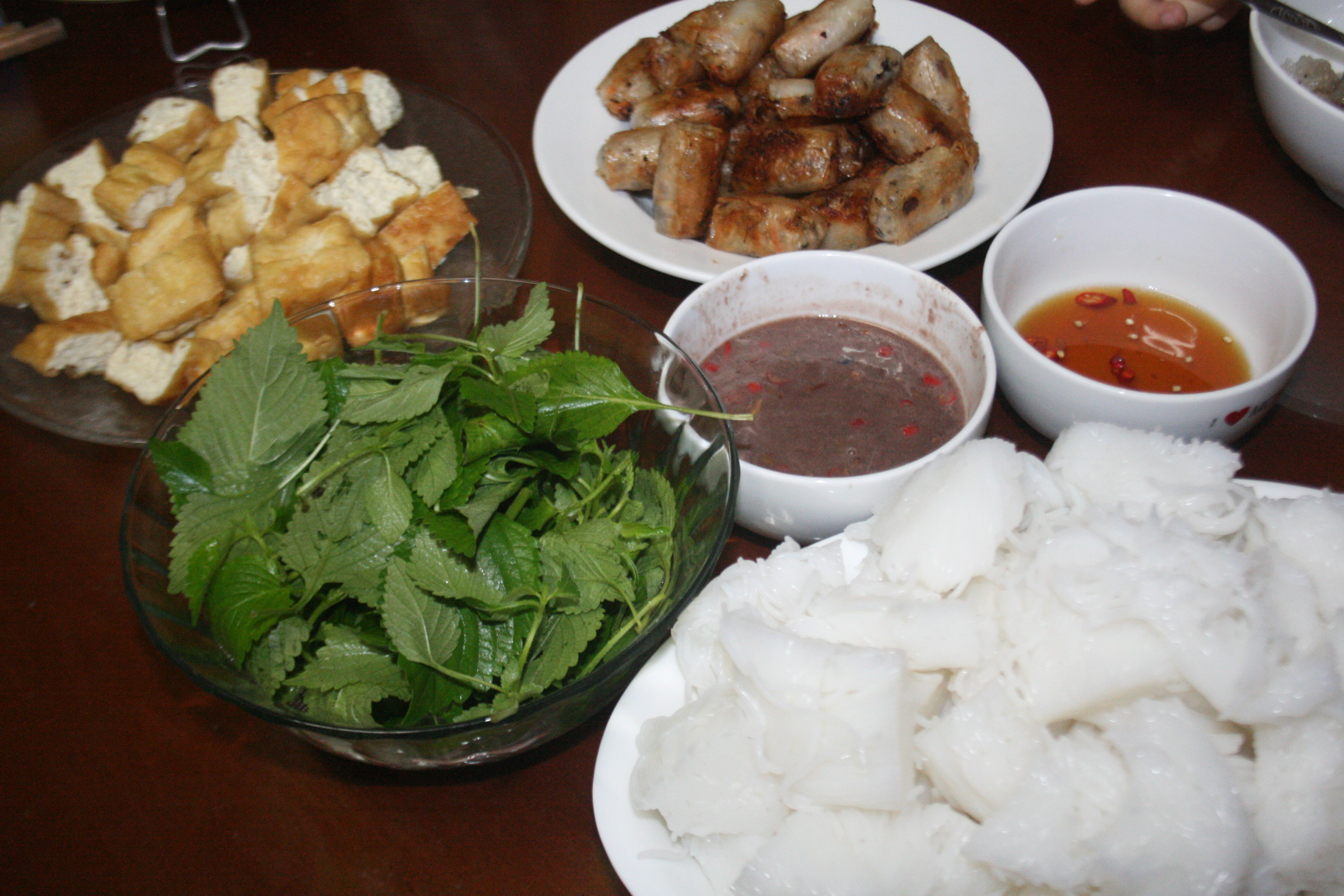
Mắm tôm (purple colour) and nước mắm (amber colour) in two dipping bowls

Name	Description
Mắm tôm	Fermented shrimp paste
Mắm cáy	Made from Sesarmidae (family of crabs), in north central coast of Vietnam
Mắm cá thu	Made from mackerel fish, usually in Bình Định province
Mắm nêm	Usually made from round scad fish, in central Vietnam
Mắm ruốc	Made from krill, from central Vietnam
Mắm cá linh	Made from a kind of fish that immigrates to the Mekong Delta every flood season from Tonlé Sap, Cambodia
Nước mắm or mắm mặn	General name for all fish sauces but usually refer to pure extracted anchovy fish sauce

=== Fermented meat dishes ===
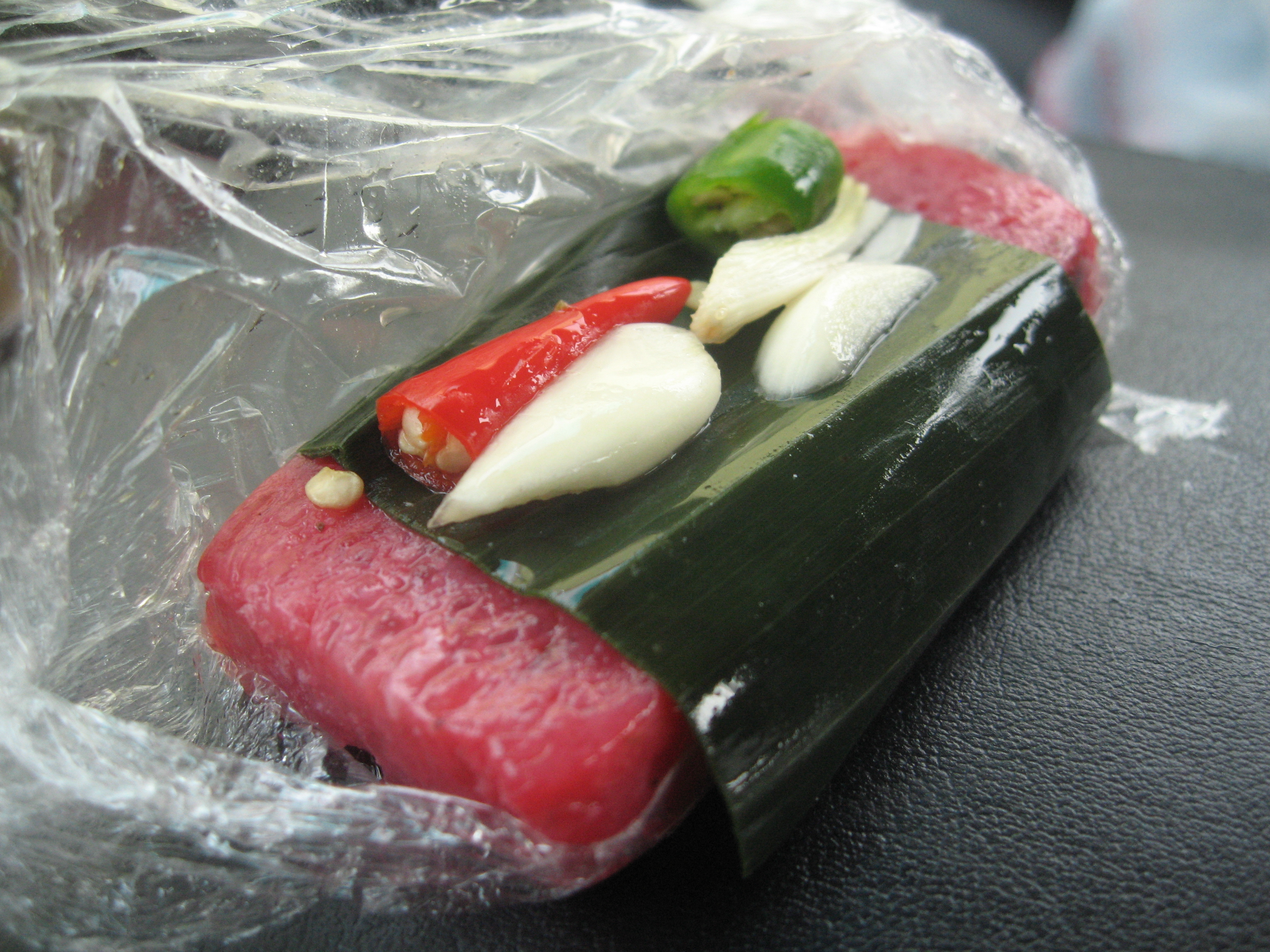
Nem chua, a sweet, sour, salty and spicy fermented pork or beef sausage, usually served with a slice of garlic, bird's eye chili and Vietnamese coriander

Nem chua, a Vietnamese fermented meat served as is or fried, is made from pork meat, coated by fried rice (thính gạo), mixed with pork skin and then wrapped in country gooseberry leaves (lá chùm ruột) or Erythrina orientalis leaves (lá vông nem). The preservation process takes about three to five days.

=== Sausages ===
Vietnamese sausage, giò, is usually made from fresh ground pork and beef. Sausage makers may use the meat, skin or ear. Fish sauce is added before banana leaves are used to wrap the mixture. The last step is boiling. For common sausage, 1 kg of meat is boiled for an hour. For chả quế, the boiled meat mixture will then be roasted with cinnamon.

=== Vegetarian dishes ===
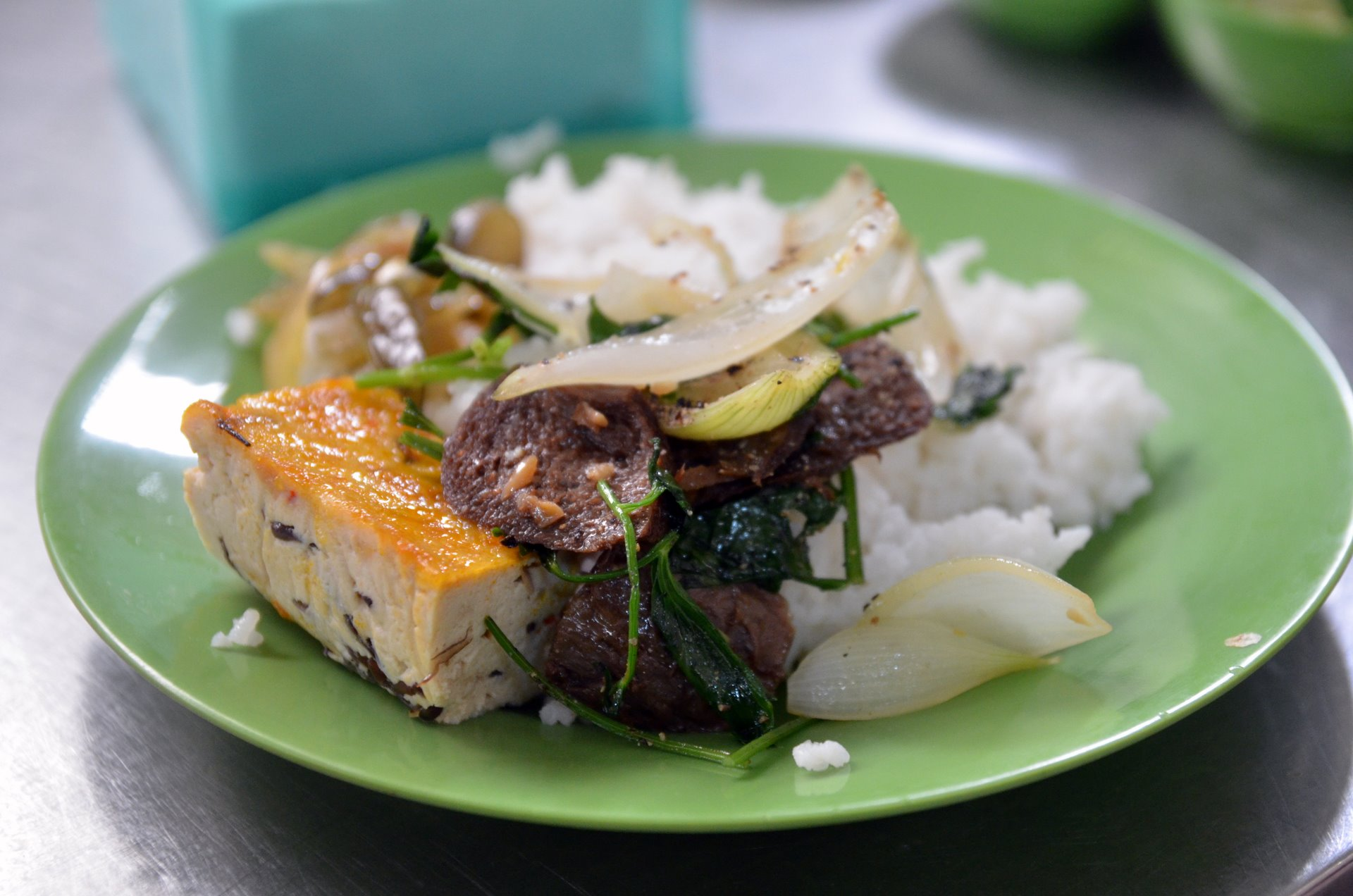
Vegetarian dishes at a Buddhist restaurant in Ho Chi Minh City

Vegetarian dishes in Vietnam often have the same names as their meat equivalents, e.g. phở bò, but with chay (vegetarian) sign in front, those dishes are served with tofu instead of meat. Nearly every soup, sandwich and street food has its vegetarian correspondent. Sometimes you can also see notations like "phở chay", "bánh mì chay" (vegetarian sandwich) or "cơm chay" (vegetarian rice). Vegetarian food in comparison the normal dishes are almost always cheaper, often half of the normal price. Vegetarian restaurants are mostly frequented by religious Vietnamese people and are rarely found in touristic areas. Vegetarian food is also eaten to earn luck during special holiday and festival, especially during Lunar New Year where Vietnamese culture serve vegetarian food regardless of their religion.

=== Desserts ===
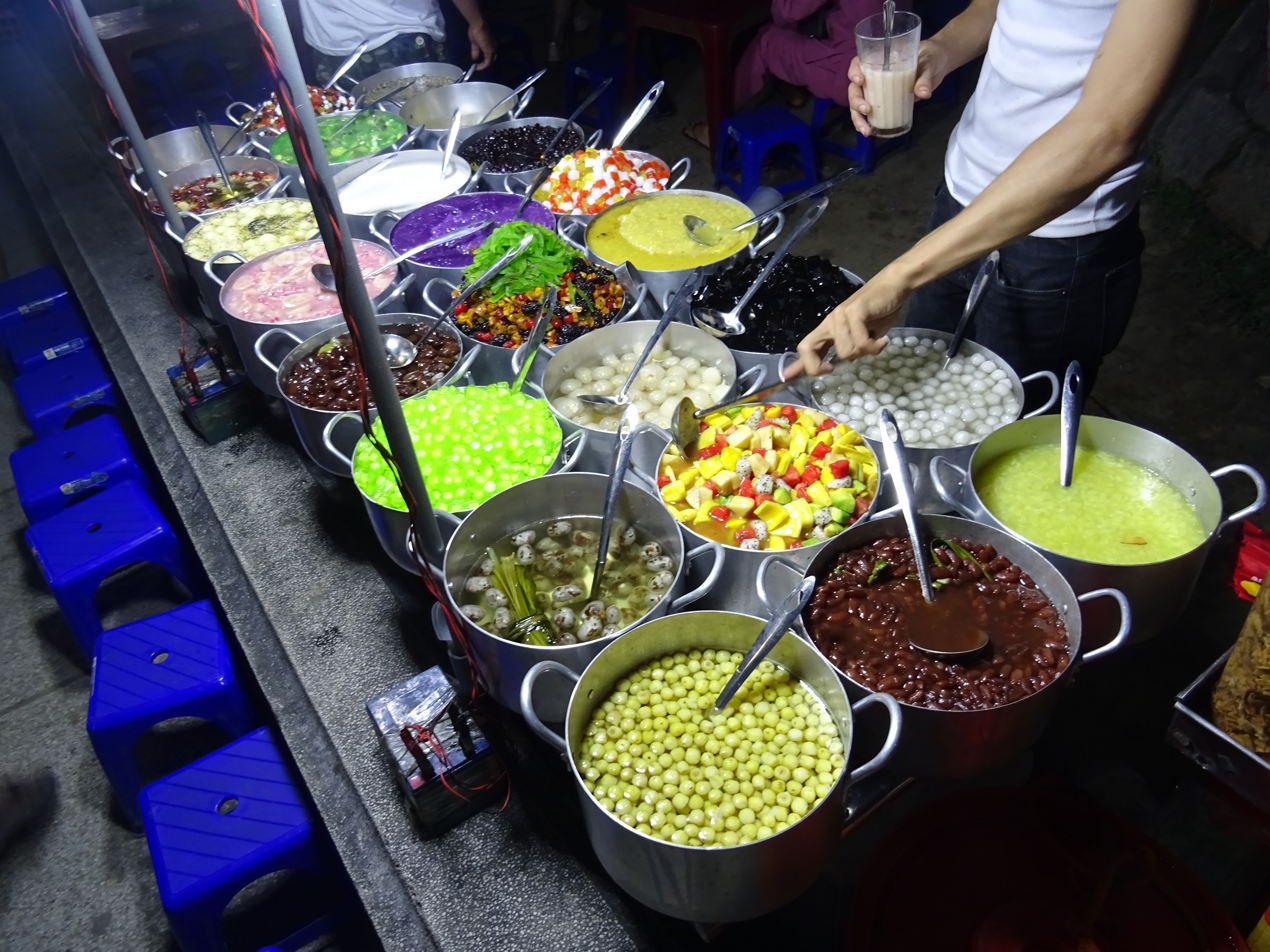
A street stall selling chè and desserts in Huế

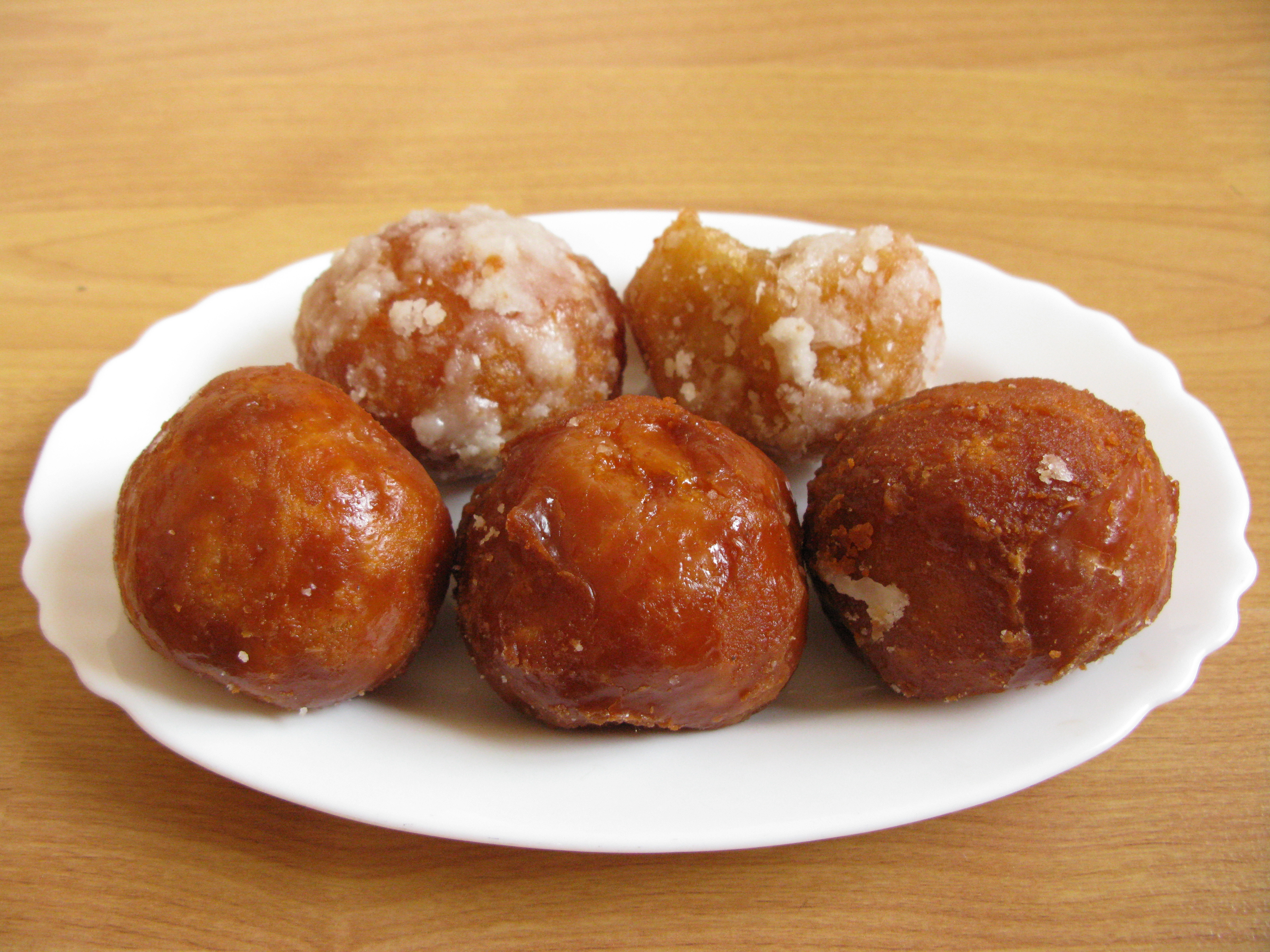
Vietnamese-style donuts

Name	Description
Chè	A sweet dessert beverage or pudding, it is usually made from beans and sticky rice. Many varieties of chè are available, each with different fruits, beans (for example, mung beans or kidney beans), and other ingredients. Chè can be served hot or cold and often with coconut milk.
Rau câu	This popular dessert is made with a type of red algae called Gracilaria and is flavored with coconut milk, pandan or other flavors. It is eaten cold by itself or added to drinks and Chè.
Chuối chiên	Banana deep-fried in a batter, often served hot with cold ice cream, usually vanilla or coconut
Bánh flan	Influenced by French cuisine and served with caramel or coffee sauce
Sinh tố	A fruit smoothie made with just a few teaspoons of sweetened condensed milk, crushed ice and fresh, local fruits. The smoothies' many varieties include custard apple, sugar apple, avocado, jackfruit, soursop, durian, strawberry, passionfruit, dragon fruit, lychee, mango, and banana.
Sữa chua	Local variant of yogurt, which was brought to Vietnam by French colonists. Made with condensed milk, it has a sweet, tart flavor. It can be eaten in its cool, soft form, or frozen, in which form it is often sold in small, clear bags.
Bánh bò	A sweet and airy sponge cake flavored with coconut milk, made from rice flour, water, sugar, and yeast.
Bánh da lợn	A sweet, soft, steamed layer cake made with rice flour, mung bean, coconut milk, water, and sugar with alternating layers of starch and flavored filling. Taro or durian are typically used for the layers of filling.
Bánh rán	A deep-fried glutinous rice ball dish.

=== Mứt ===
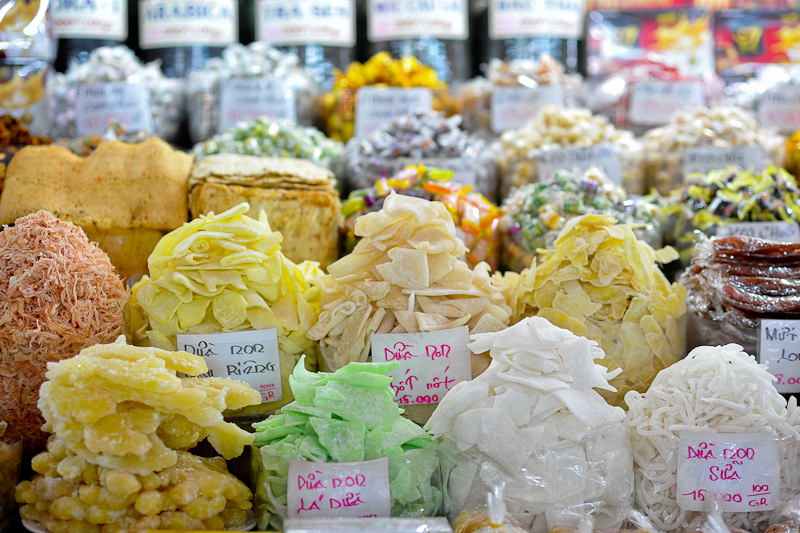
A variety of mứt on display in a shop

Vietnamese use fruits in season. When the season is passing, they make candied fruit, called ô mai, and fruit preserves, called mứt. The original taste of ô mai is sour, sweet, salty, and spicy. The most famous kind of ô mai is ô mai mơ, made from apricots harvested from the forest around Perfume Pagoda (Chùa Hương), Hà Tây province. This ô mai consists of apricot covered by ginger, sugar, and liquorice root slivers.

=== Tofu ===
Tofu (đậu phụ) is widely used in Vietnamese cuisine. It is boiled, fried (sprinkled with ground shrimp or oil-dipped minced spring onion) or used as an ingredient in a variety of dishes.

Other soybean products range from soy sauce (nước tương; usually light soy sauce), fermented bean paste (tương), and fermented bean curd (đậu phụ nhự or chao) to douhua (soft tofu sweet soup; tàu hũ nước đường or tào phớ).

=== Bò kho ===
Bo kho is a dish made from beef with a stewing method, originating from the South of Vietnam. Originally, Southern Vietnamese people served Bo kho with many kinds of herbs to enhance the flavor of the dish. Although it is called "kho" (meaning "to stew"), the main cooking method of the dish is braising. The stewing method is used to marinate and tenderize the beef before braising.

=== Phở ===
Phở is a traditional Vietnamese dish originating from Van Cu, Nam Định province. It is traditionally served with a variety of herbs to enhance its flavor. Nowadays, there are many different ways to prepare and flavor phở. In Vietnam, there are different names to distinguish them: Northern phở (in the North), Huế phở (in the Central region), and Saigon phở (in the South). In 2016, the Japanese chose April 4 of each year as Vietnam's Phở Day in Japan. In Vietnam, on December 12, 2017, Tuổi Trẻ newspaper cooperated with Acecook Vietnam Company to organize the first Phở Day. This will be an annual traditional activity. Since 2018, "Phở Day" will be organized as a community cultural and tourism activity.

== Exotic dishes ==
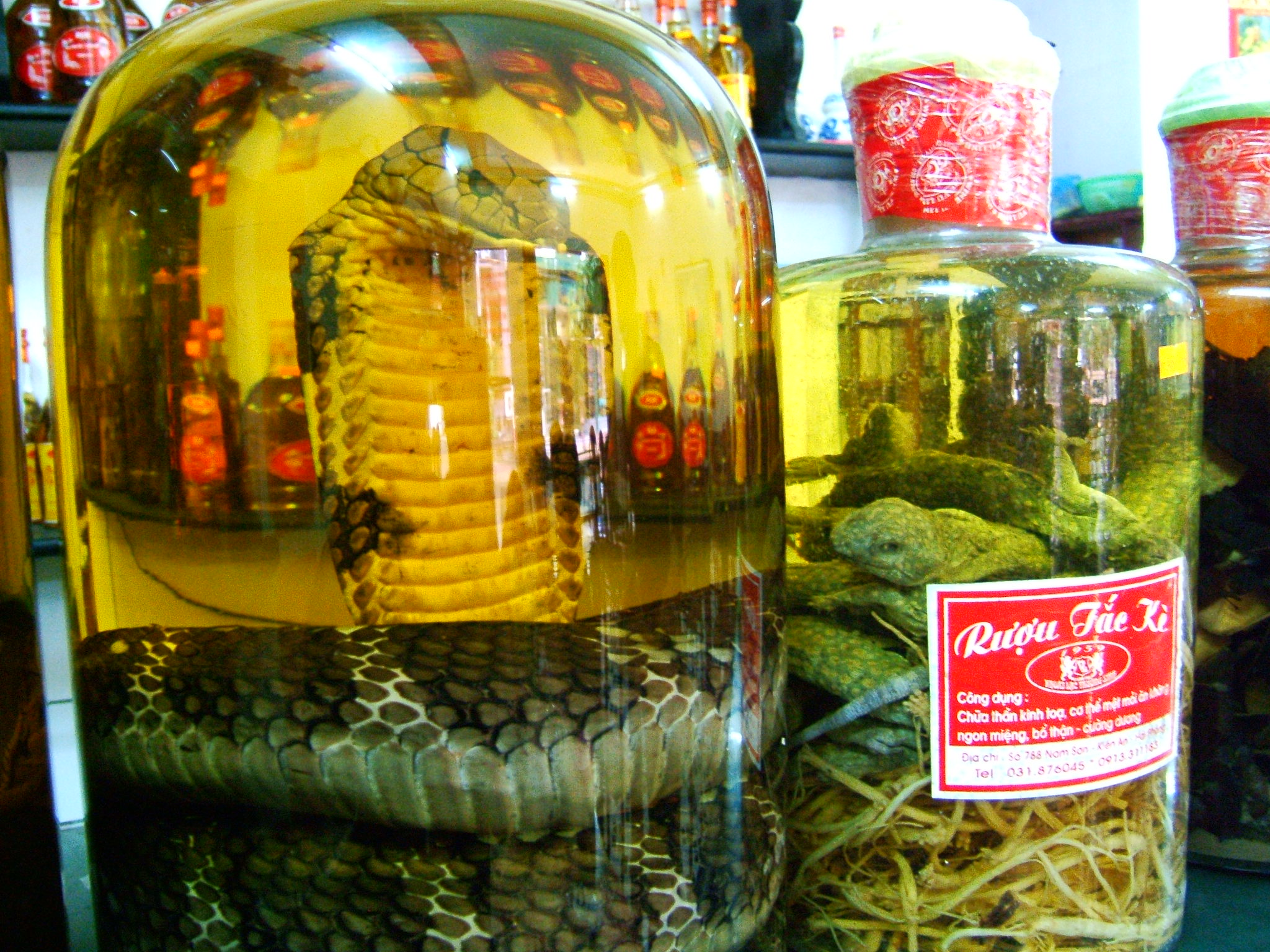
Snake is one of Vietnamese varieties of rượu thuốc. The bottle on the left is a cobra wine (rượu rắn).

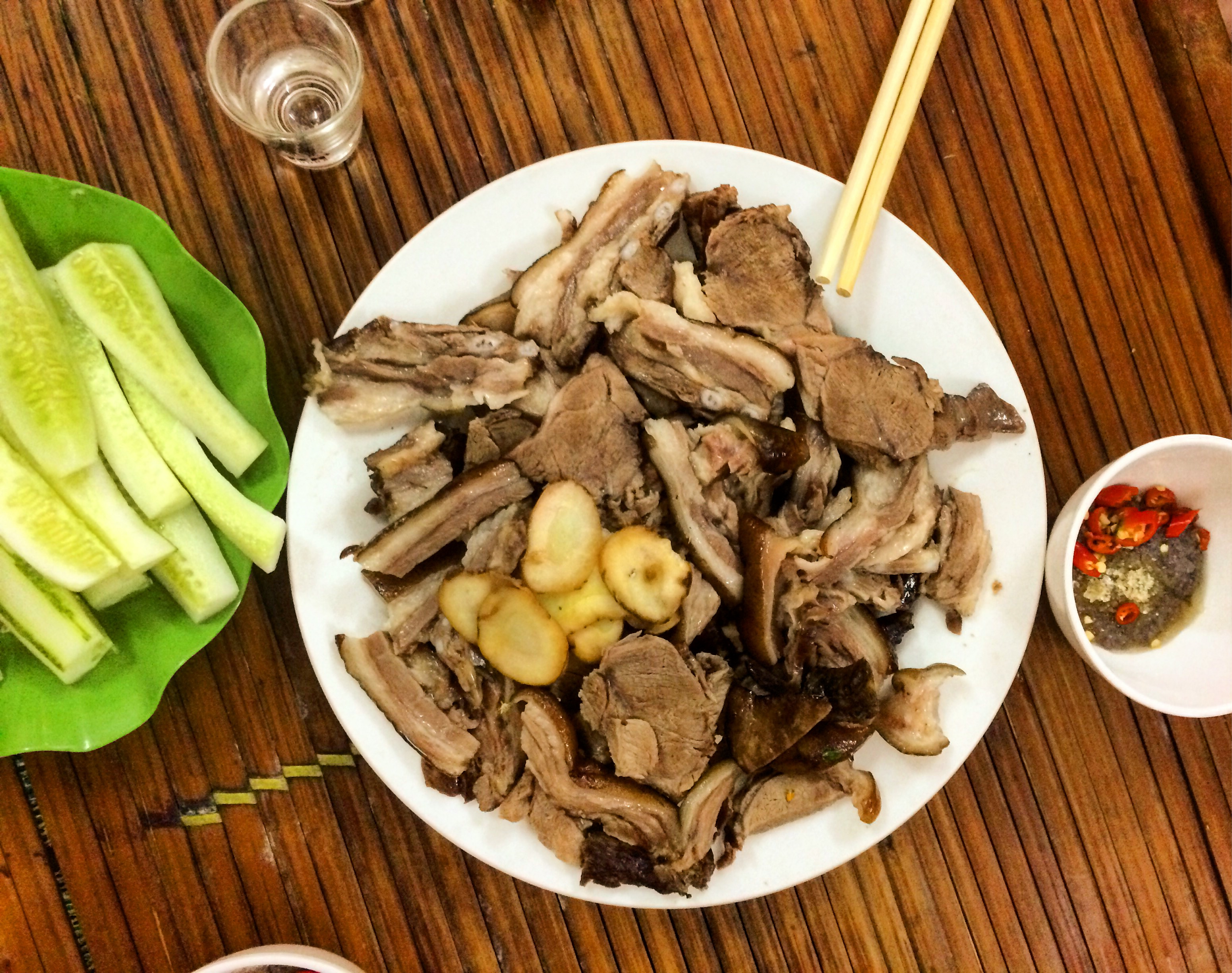
Thịt chó (boiled dog meat)

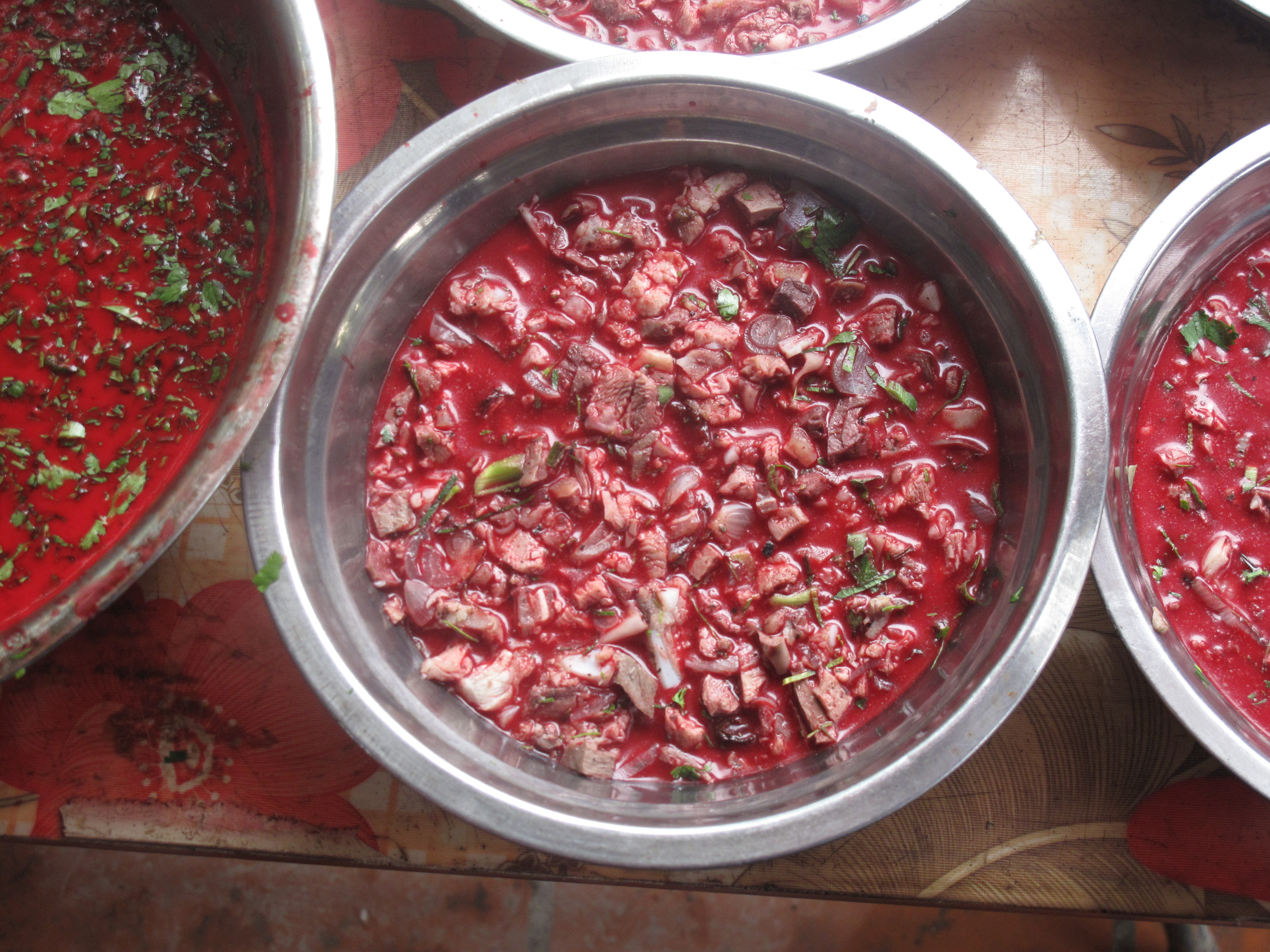
Tiết canh (blood pudding with cubed meat and herbs)

The use of ingredients typically uncommon or taboo in most countries is one of the quintessential attributes that make Vietnamese cuisine unique. While unusual ingredients can only be found in exotic restaurants in many countries, Vietnamese cuisine is deemed atypical in that the usage of these ingredients can play a customary role in daily family dishes regardless of social class.

A common and inexpensive breakfast dish that can be found in any wet market, balut (hột vịt lộn) is a fertilized duck egg with a nearly developed embryo inside, which is boiled and eaten in the shell. It is typically served with fresh herbs: rau răm, salt, and black pepper; lime juice is another popular additive, when available. A more unusual version of balut dish—fetus quail (trứng cút lộn) is a snack favored by many Vietnamese students. Paddy crab and paddy snail are the main ingredients in bún riêu ốc—a popular noodle dish—and in some everyday soup dishes (canh) and braised food (món bung). Family meals with silkworms (nhộng), banana flowers (hoa chuối), sparrows, doves, fermented fish and shrimp (mắm cá, mắm tôm, mắm tép) are not rare sights. Seasonal favorites include ragworms (rươi), which are made into many dishes such as fried rươi omelet (chả rươi), fermented rươi sauce (mắm rươi), steamed rươi (rươi hấp), stir-fried rươi with radish or bamboo shoot (rươi xào củ niễng măng tươi hay củ cải). Three-striped crab (ba khía) is popular in several southern provinces, including Cà Mau, Sóc Trăng and Bạc Liêu; it is eaten fermented, stir-fried or steamed.

Northern Vietnamese cuisine is also notable for its wide range of meat choices. Exotic meats such as dog meat, cat meat, rat meat, snake meat, soft-shell turtle, deer, and domestic goat are sold in street-side restaurants and generally paired with alcoholic beverages. A taboo in many Western countries and in southern Vietnam, consumption of dog meat and cat meat is common throughout the northern part of the country and is believed to raise the libido in men. Television chef Andrew Zimmern visited northern Vietnam in the 12th episode of his popular show Bizarre Foods with Andrew Zimmern. Cobra beating heart and dried bones, silkworms, and bull penis are some of the dishes he sampled. He also tried porcupine.

Paddy mouse meat—barbecued, braised, stir- or deep-fried—is a delicacy dish that can be found in Southern Vietnamese rural areas or even high-end city restaurants.

Crocodiles were eaten by Vietnamese while they were taboo and off limits for Chinese.

Shark fins are imported in massive amounts by Vietnam.

Anthony Bourdain, the host chef of Travel Channel's Anthony Bourdain: No Reservations, wrote in April 2005: "...everything is used—and nothing wasted in Vietnam." Animal parts that are often disposed of in many Western countries are used fully in Vietnamese cooking. Organs, including lungs, livers, hearts, intestines and bladders of pigs, cattle, and chickens are sold at even higher prices than their meat. Chicken testicles and undeveloped eggs are stir-fried with vegetables and served as an everyday dish.

Many of the traditional northern Lunar New Year dishes such as thịt đông, giò thủ, and canh măng móng giò involve the use of pig heads, tongues, throats and feet. Pig and beef tails, as well as chicken heads, necks and feet, are Vietnamese favorite beer dishes. Bóng bì, used as an ingredient in canh bóng—a kind of soup, is pig skin baked until popped. Steamed pig brains can be found almost everywhere. Also in the northern part of Vietnam, different kinds of animal blood can be made into a dish called tiết canh by whisking the blood with fish sauce and cold water in a shallow dish along with finely chopped, cooked duck innards (such as gizzards), sprinkled with crushed peanuts and chopped herbs such as Vietnamese coriander, mint, etc. It is then cooled until the blood coagulates into a soft, jelly-like mixture and served raw.

Coconut worms, or đuông dừa, is a delicacy found widely in the Trà Vinh province of Vietnam. They are the larvae form of the palm weevil and are eaten live within a salty fish sauce with chili peppers.

== Beverages ==
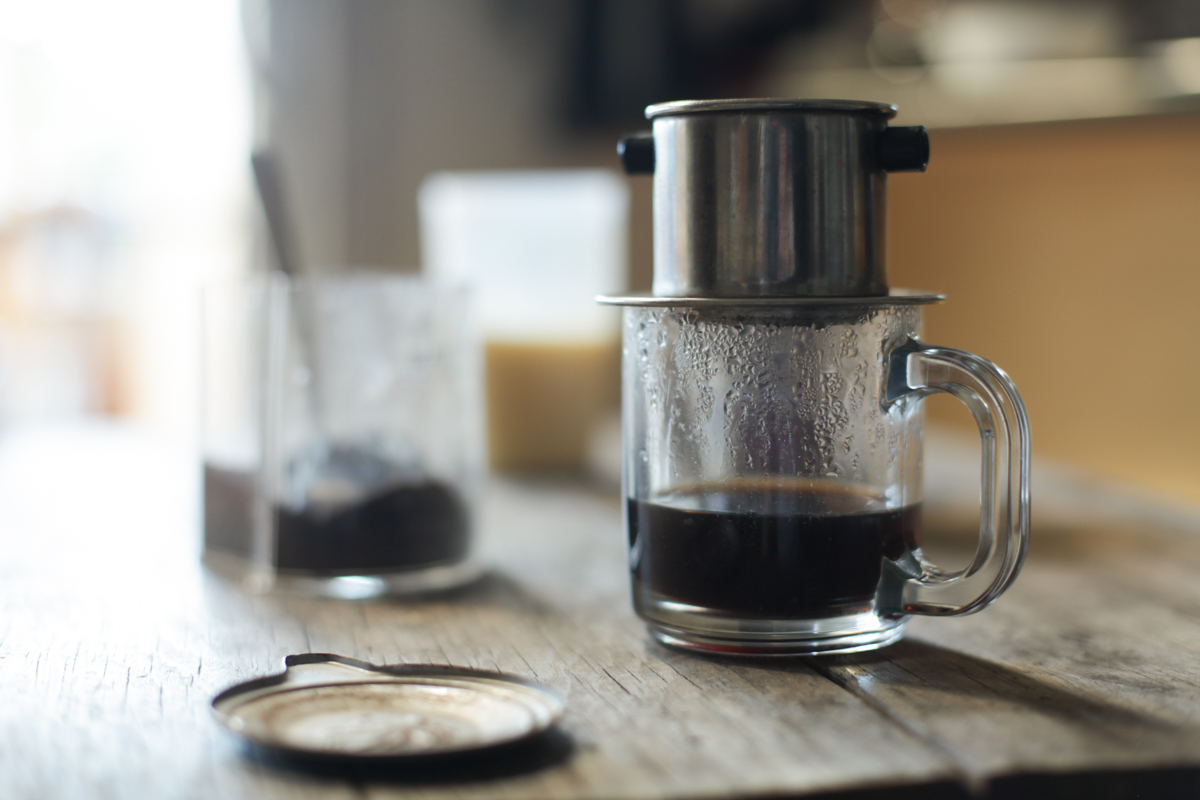
Cà phê phin (brewed filtered coffee)

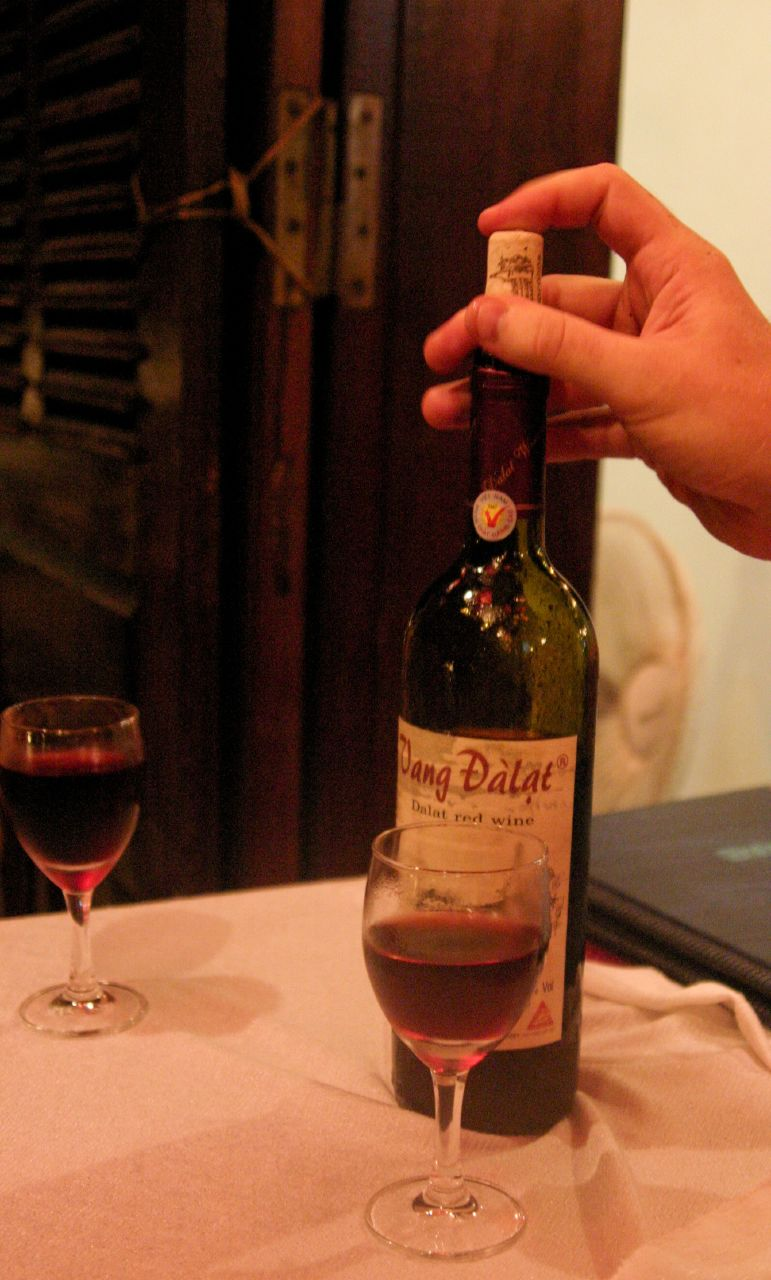
Vietnamese wine

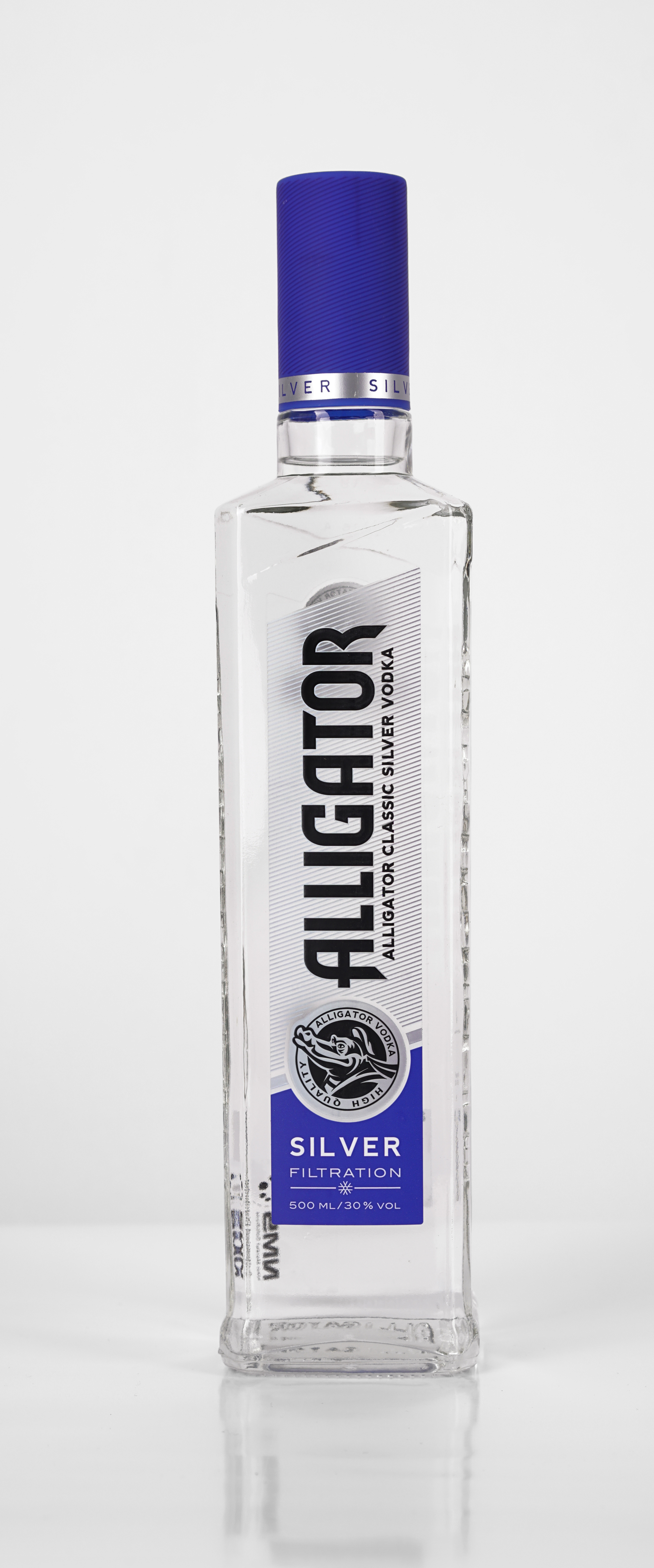
Vietnamese vodka

Name	Description
Jasmine tea	A local tea beverage of Vietnam
Bia hơi	A Vietnamese specialty draft beer produced locally in small batches
Cà phê sữa đá	Strong dark roast iced coffee, served with sweetened condensed milk at the bottom of the cup to be stirred in, is very popular among the Vietnamese.
Cà phê trứng	This beverage translated as Vietnamese egg coffee. This coffee uses egg yolk, whipping cream, condensed milk, and, of course, espresso. Some may use vanilla extract or sugar as a sugar substitute.
Nước mía	Sugar cane juice extracted from squeezing sugar cane plant (sometimes with kumquats to add a hint of citrus flavour), served with ice.
Rau má	Pennywort juice made from blending fresh pennywort leaves with water and sugar until dissolved is a near-transparent green color and served over ice.
Sữa đậu nành	A soybean drink served either hot or cold, sweetened or unsweetened. This beverage is very popular in all Asian countries. In Vietnam, however, the difference between other Asian countries' soy milk and Vietnam's soy milk is the use of pandan leaves. While the use of pandan leaves is very popular with this drink, other countries use a different source of sweetness.
Rượu đế	A distilled liquor made of rice
Trà đá	A kind of iced tea popular for its cheap price, it has a faint lime-yellow color and usually does not have much taste.
Trà đá chanh	Lemon iced tea
Chanh muối	Sweet and sour salty lime drink
Soda xí muội	Sweet and salty plum soda
Soda hột gà	Egg soda
Sinh tố	Vietnamese fruit smoothie with green bean, red bean, avocado, pineapple, strawberry, jackfruit, apple custard, durian, sapota, or mango with sweet condensed milk and crushed ice
Nước sắn dây hoa bưởi	Made of kudzu and pomelo flower extract

== See also ==
- List of Vietnamese dishes
- List of Vietnamese culinary specialities
- List of Vietnamese ingredients
- Vietnamese noodles
- Vietnamese wine
- Rượu đế rice wine
- Basa (fish)
- Southeast Asian cuisine
