= Món cuốn =

Vietnamese roll and wrap dishes

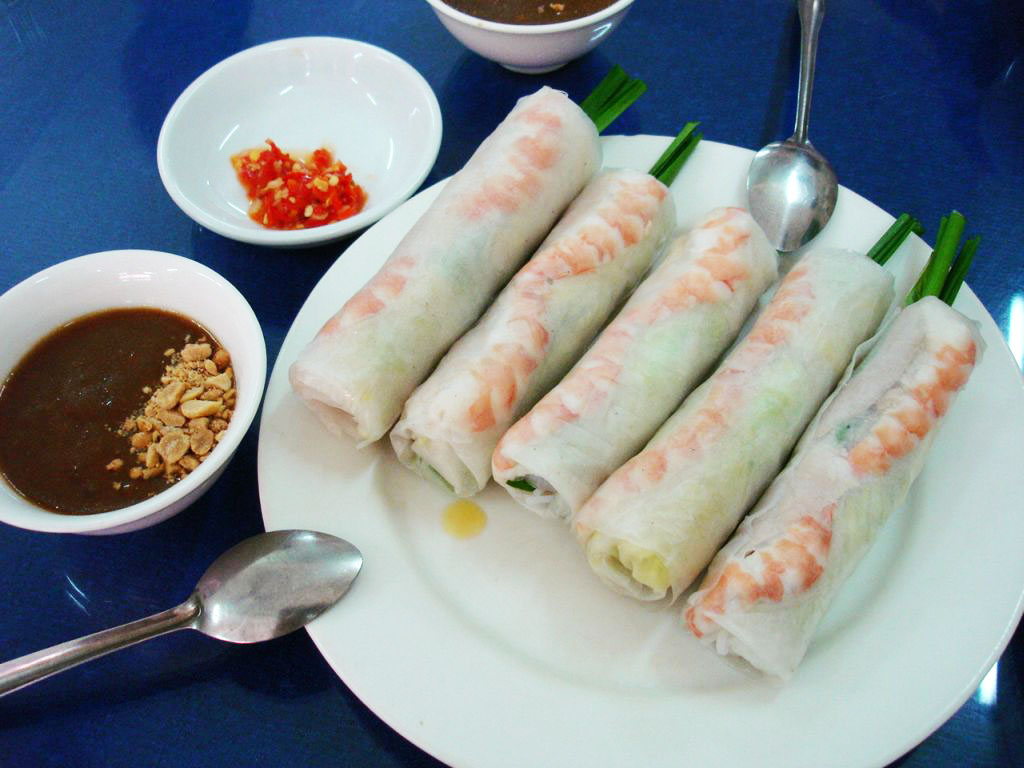
Vietnamese gỏi cuốn

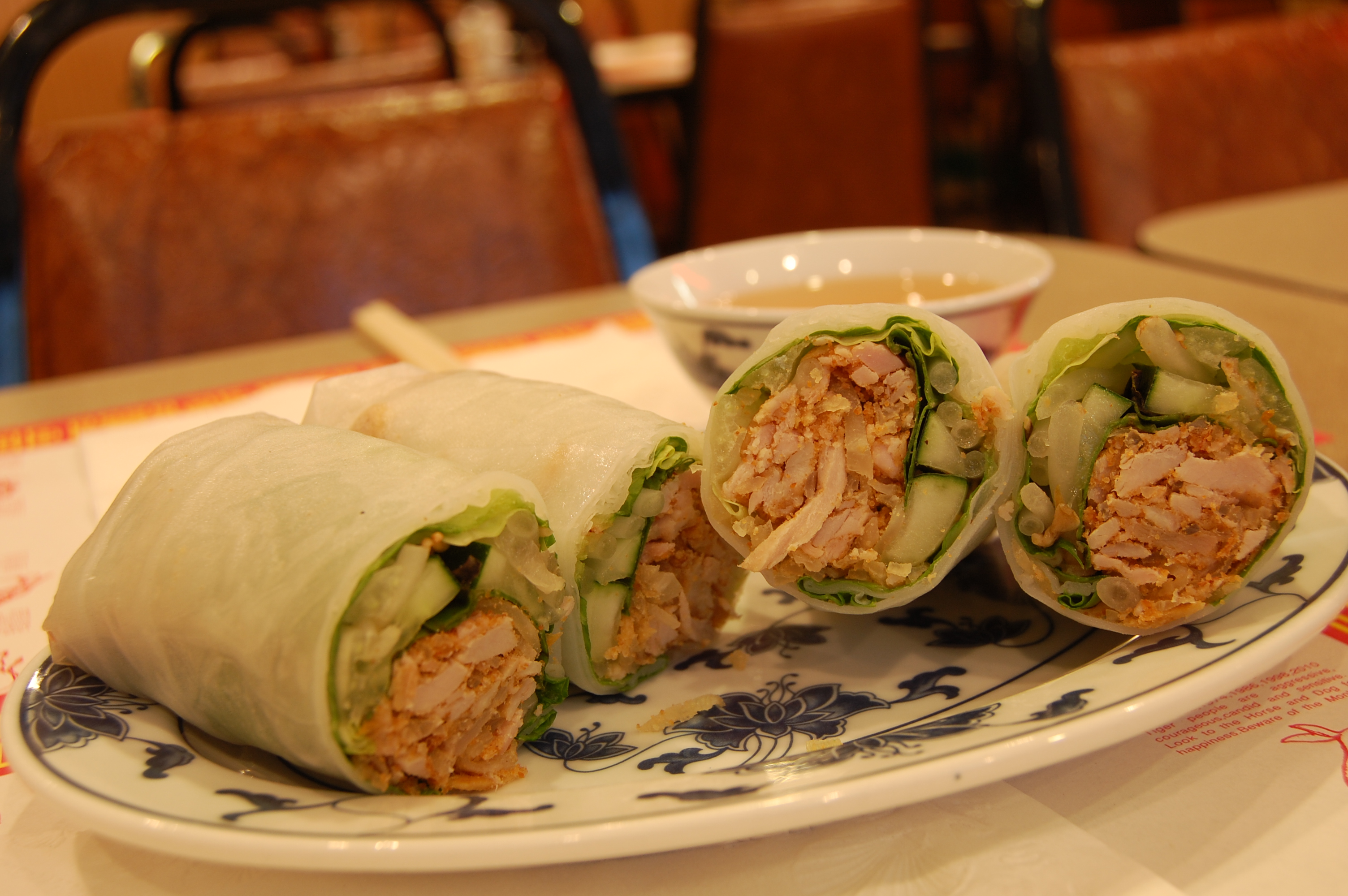
Bì cuốn

Món cuốn refer to Vietnamese roll and wrap dishes which include a variety of ingredients rolled in bánh tráng or vegetable leaf; it may include vegetable and herb leaves, or other kinds of vegetable. The range of possible ingredients allows people to select only what they want, according to their taste. The dish is always served with a dipping sauce called nước chấm.

Món cuốn is a finger food in which the ingredients are cooked but the diners assemble their own rolls. It is also a real variety of fast food because of its fast-cooking process but invented from the old days.

== Varieties ==
- Banh cuon
- Bò bía
- Bò cuốn lá lốt - grilled meat wrapped in lolot leaves
- Bánh ướt thịt nướng - thin steamed rolled rice pancake with roast meat and salad.
- Cuốn cá nục
- Cuốn tôm chua thịt luộc
- Cuốn ốc gạo
- Cuốn cá lóc hấp nước dừa
- Cuốn đầu heo ngâm chua
- Cuốn diếp
- Chả giò rế
- Cuốn ốc gạo
- Cuốn nem nướng - made with grilled pork meatballs
- Spring roll
- Summer roll
- Trảng Bàng dew-wetted rice paper
