= Spring roll =

Type of dim sum

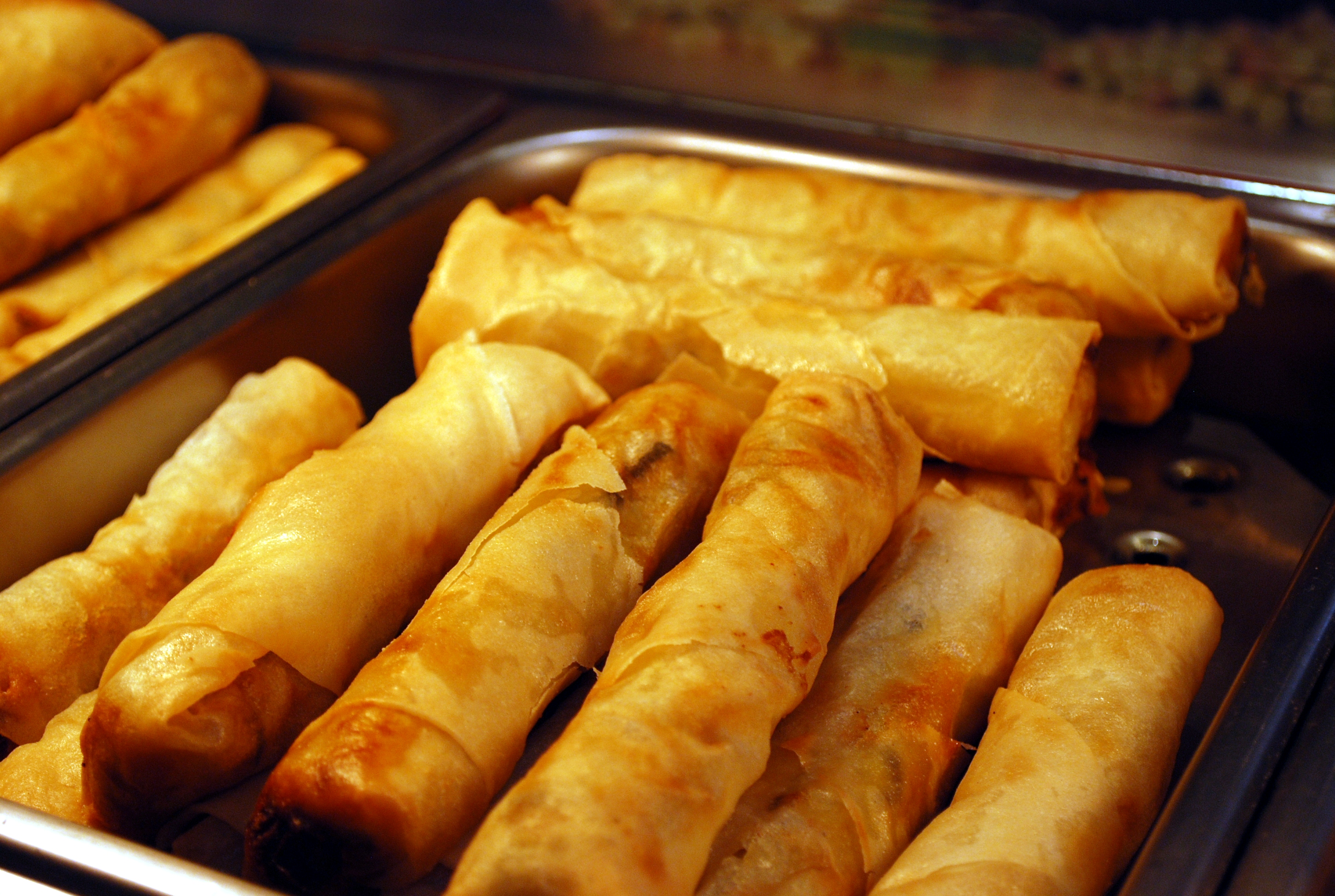
- Course: Hors d'oeuvre
- Place of origin: China, Thailand, Vietnam
- Region or state: East Asia and Southeast Asia
- Variations: See below

Chinese name
- Chinese: 春卷
- Hanyu Pinyin: chūn juǎn
- Cantonese Yale: chēun gyún
- Literal meaning: Spring roll
Transcriptions
Standard Mandarin
- Hanyu Pinyin: chūn juǎn
Yue: Cantonese
- Yale Romanization: chēun gyún

Spring rolls are rolled appetizers or dim sum commonly found in Chinese and Southeast Asian cuisines. The wrapper usually made of Filo, fillings, and cooking technique vary by region but are generally filled with vegetables or ground meat.

== Regional history ==
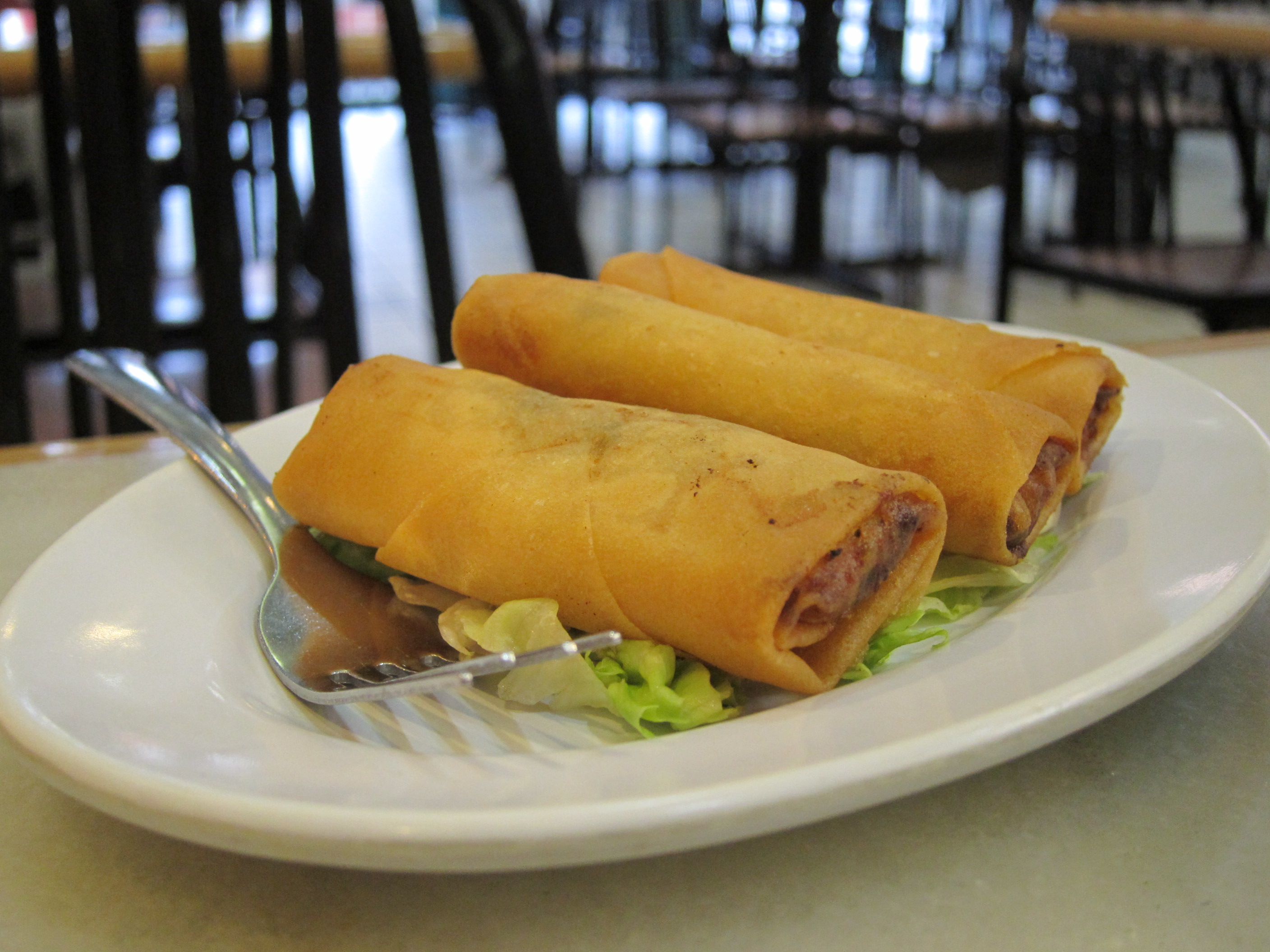
Fried spring rolls

=== East Asia ===
==== Mainland China ====
Spring rolls are a seasonal food consumed during the spring; it started as a pancake filled with the new season's spring vegetables, a welcome change from the preserved foods of the long winter months. In Chinese cuisine, spring rolls are savoury rolls with cabbage and other vegetable fillings inside a thinly wrapped cylindrical pastry. They are usually eaten during the Spring Festival in mainland China, hence the name. Meat varieties, particularly pork, are also popular. Fried spring rolls are generally small and crisp. They can be sweet or savoury, the former often with red bean paste filling, and the latter typically prepared with vegetables. They are fully wrapped before being pan-fried or deep-fried.

Non-fried spring rolls are typically bigger and more savoury. Unlike fried spring rolls, non-fried ones are typically made by filling the wrapping with pre-cooked ingredients. Traditionally, they are a festive food eaten during the Cold Food Day festival and the Tomb Sweeping Day festival in spring to remember and pay respect to ancestors. The Hakka population sometimes also eats spring rolls on the third day of the third month of the lunar calendar (三月三 sān yuè sān). The wrappings can be a flour-based mix or batter.

==== Hong Kong and Macau ====
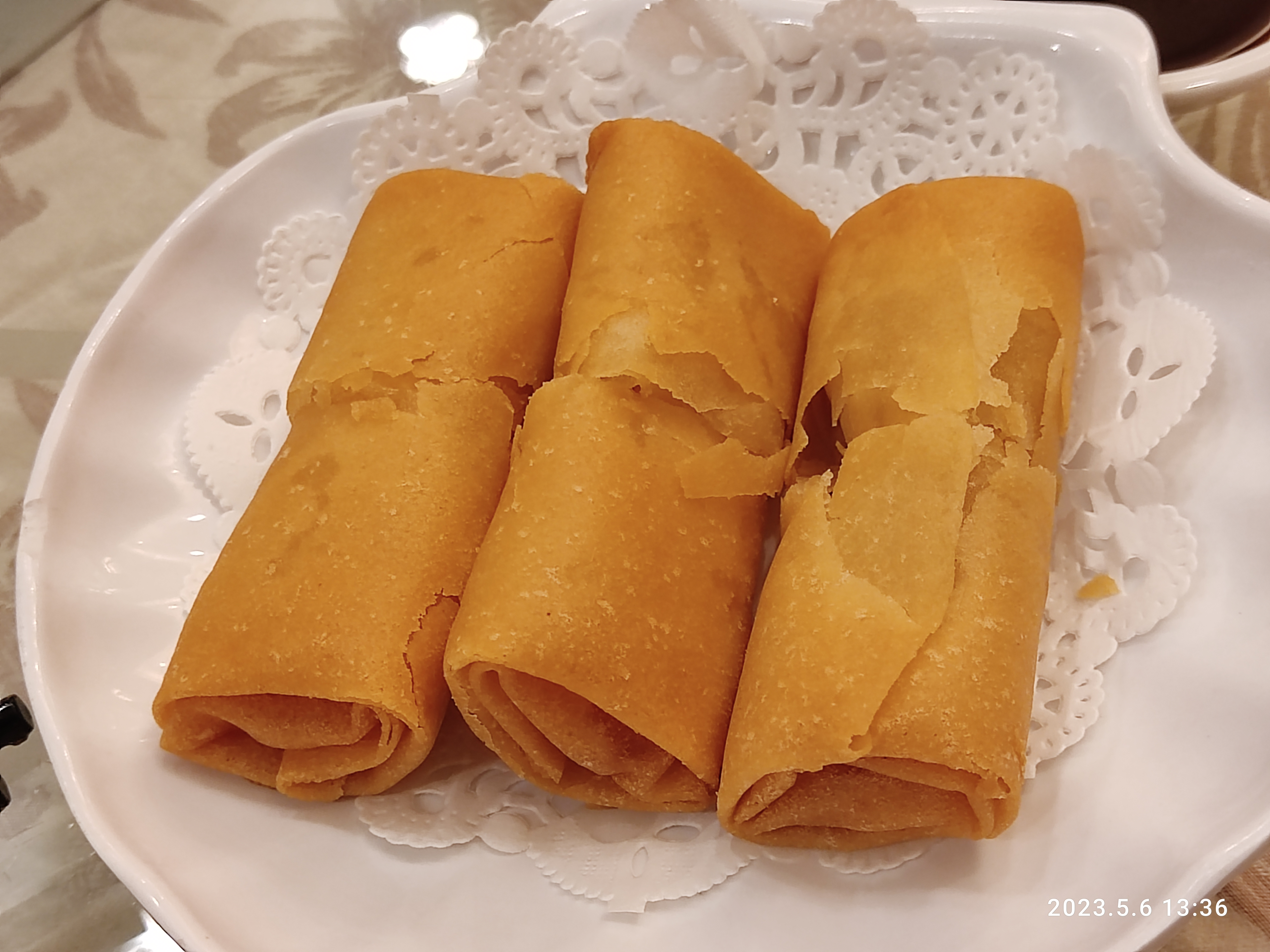
Hong Kong-style spring rolls

Spring roll is a fried dish usually available as a dim sum. They typically contain minced pork, shredded carrot, bean sprouts and other vegetables served with dipping sauce.

==== Taiwan ====
In Taiwan, the most commonly eaten non-fried spring rolls are popiah, called lūn-piánn (潤餅) or po̍h-piánn (薄餅) in Taiwanese. In northern Taiwan, the ingredients are generally flavoured with herbs, stir-fried, and sometimes topped with a finely ground peanut powder before being wrapped. In southern Taiwan, the ingredients are generally boiled or blanched in plain water. Sometimes caster or super fine sugar is added along with the peanut powder before all the ingredients are wrapped.

==== Japan ====
In Japan, spring rolls are known as harumaki (春巻き) and are often served with karashi mustard or soy sauce.

=== Southeast Asia ===
==== Indonesia, Malaysia, Myanmar, the Philippines, Thailand, and Singapore ====
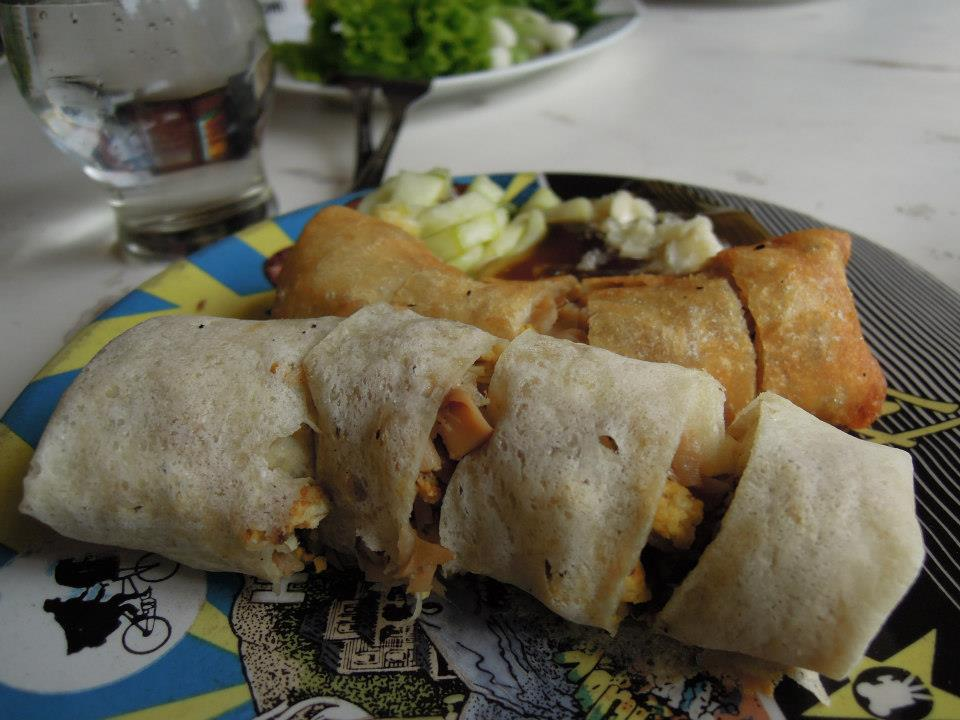
Fried and unfried lumpia

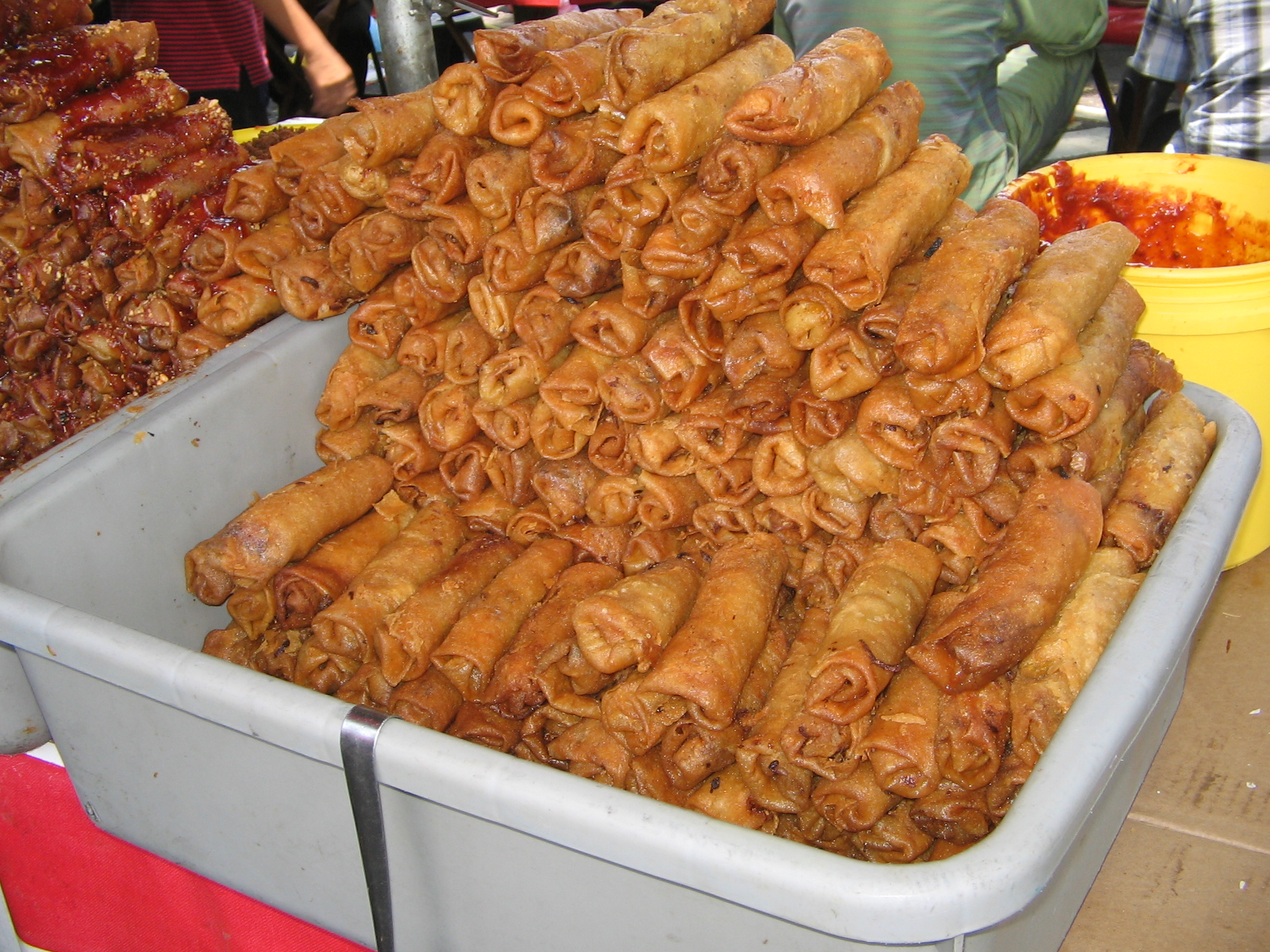
Hot and spicy popiah in Malaysia

Lumpia is the name for spring rolls in Indonesia and the Philippines, which was derived from Southern Chinese spring rolls. The name lumpia derives from Hokkien lunpia (Chinese: 潤餅; pinyin: rùnbǐng; Pe̍h-ōe-jī: jūn-piáⁿ, lūn-piáⁿ) and was introduced in the Philippine islands during the 17th century. It is a savoury snack made of thin crêpe pastry skin enveloping a mixture of savoury fillings, consisting of chopped vegetables (including carrots, cabbage, green beans, bamboo shoots, banana heart and leeks), or sometimes also minced meat (chicken, shrimp, pork or beef). It is often served as an appetizer or snack, and might be served deep-fried or fresh (unfried). In Malaysia, Singapore and Thailand, it is called popiah as in Taiwan, while in Myanmar, it is referred as kawpyan (ကော်ပြန့်).

==== Cambodia ====
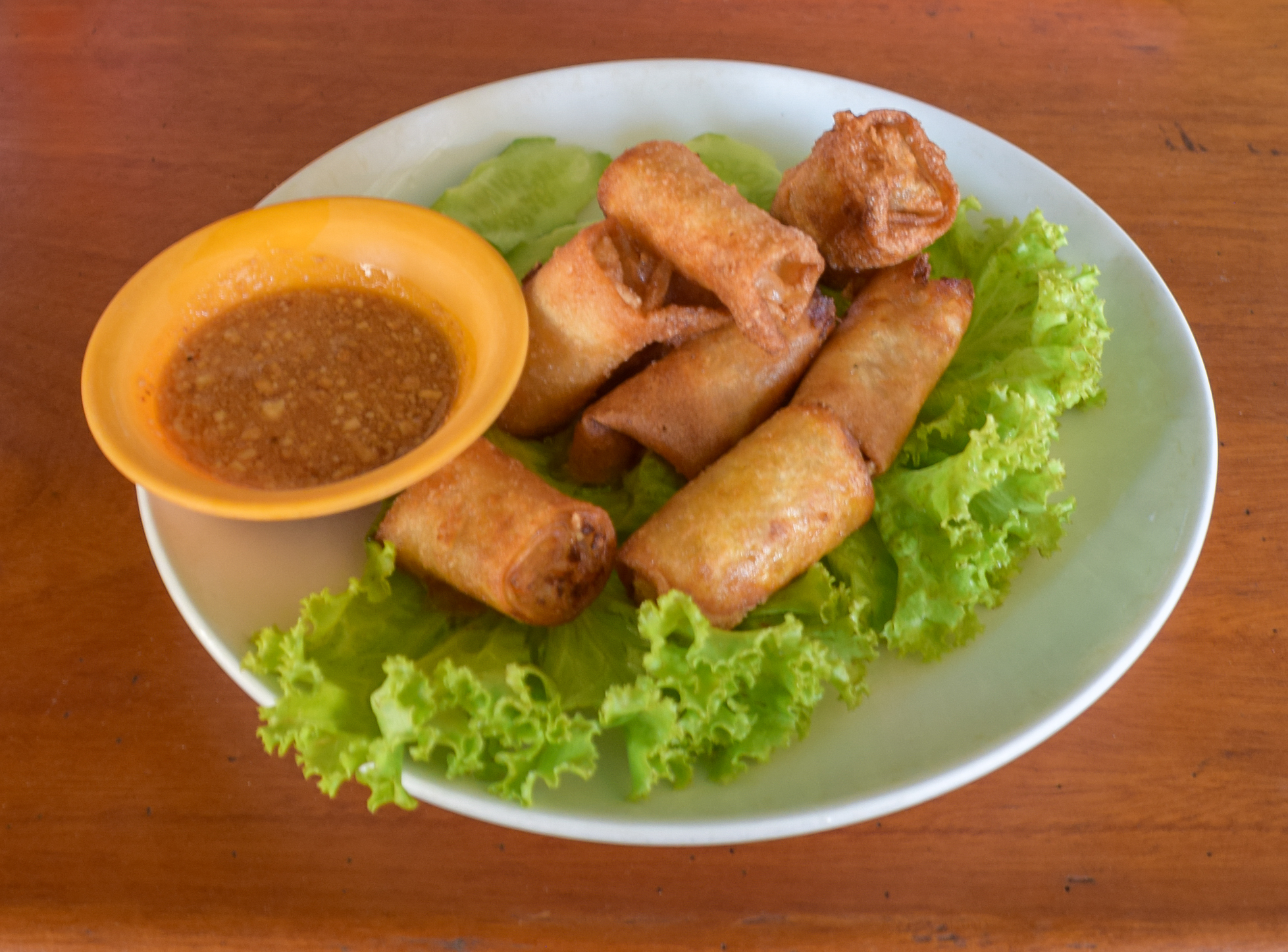
Cambodian fried spring rolls with a dipping sauce

Cambodian fried spring rolls are called chai yor (Khmer: ចៃយ៉) or naem chien (ណែមចៀន). Despite originating in the Chinese Cambodian community, fried spring rolls have spread throughout the country. They are different from Chinese spring rolls with their filling often not being cooked before frying, making Cambodian spring rolls lighter. Also, fish sauce is usually used in the filling, instead of oyster or soy sauce, and Cambodian spring rolls, if not reheated, are fried only once.

==== Vietnam ====
Video demonstration of spring roll preparation

The fried version with minced pork or chicken is called imperial rolls or chả giò (southern Vietnam), nem cuốn, chả cuốn or Nem rán (northern Vietnam). They are often called "egg rolls" and "spring rolls" in Western countries, which is a misnomer. Central Vietnam has its own version of a fried roll called "ram". Ram is always made from whole shell-on shrimp or chopped de-shelled shrimp and some green onions, wrapped in rice paper wrappers and deep fried. Like most speciality food items from central Vietnam, ram is not widely available in Vietnamese restaurants overseas.

A Vietnamese imperial roll is different from a Chinese spring roll in that it is typically smaller and contains ground or chopped meats/seafood such as pork, crab, shrimp, chicken, taro or cassava, glass noodles, wood-ear fungi or oyster mushrooms, and shredded carrots. Rice paper is traditionally used as wrappers. However, several Vietnamese restaurants in Western countries may use egg spring roll wrappers due to the unavailability of rice paper or ease of use.

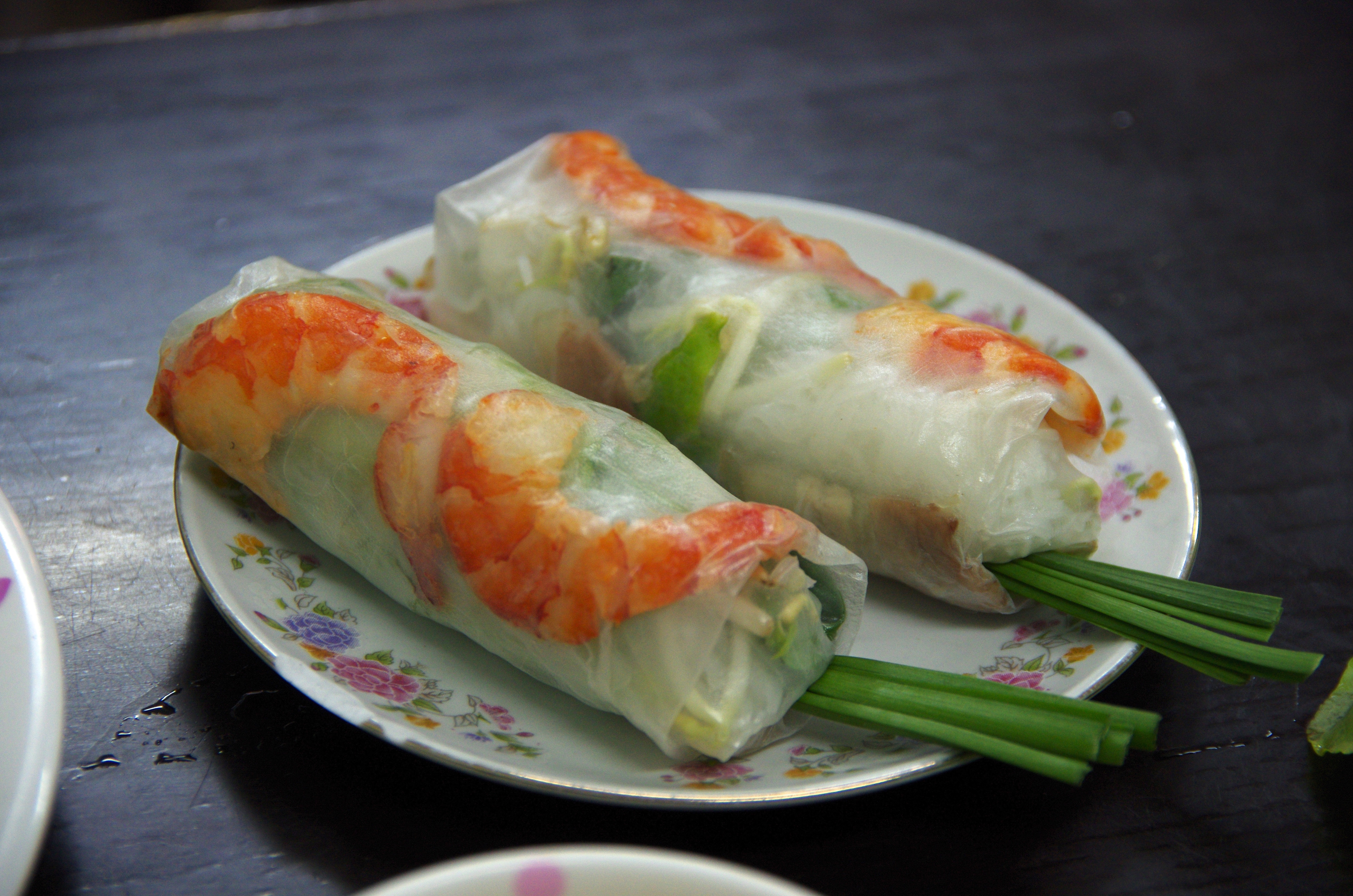
Gỏi cuốn or summer roll

Vietnamese spring roll names
Region or Type	Name
South of Vietnam	Chả giò
North of Vietnam	Nem
Rice paper roll not fried	Gỏi cuốn or Bò bía

Rice paper rolls or summer rolls are a Vietnamese delicacy known as "gỏi cuốn" or "nem cuốn". Depending on the region, salad rolls were made differently. Some vegetarian families make vegetarian rice paper rolls rather than meat rice paper rolls. However, the typical ingredients include slivers of cooked pork (most often cha pork sausages), shrimp, sometimes chicken or tofu, fresh herbs like basil or cilantro, lettuce, cucumbers, sometimes fresh garlic, chives, rice vermicelli, all wrapped in moistened rice paper. A typical "gỏi cuốn" may only contain boiled pork, boiled rice noodles, cucumber, carrot and herbs. Fresh Vietnamese rice paper rolls can be made at home or found at Vietnamese restaurants and some grocery stores. They are served at room temperature with dipping sauce. Nước chấm, tương xào, or a hoisin peanut sauce are all common dipping sauces. A typical hoisin dipping sauce includes chilli, hoisin sauce, peanut butter and sugar. A standard "nước mắm pha" (nước chấm) dipping sauce is composed of fish sauce, lime, garlic, sugar, and chillies or simply fish sauce, sugar and vinegar.

=== Oceania ===
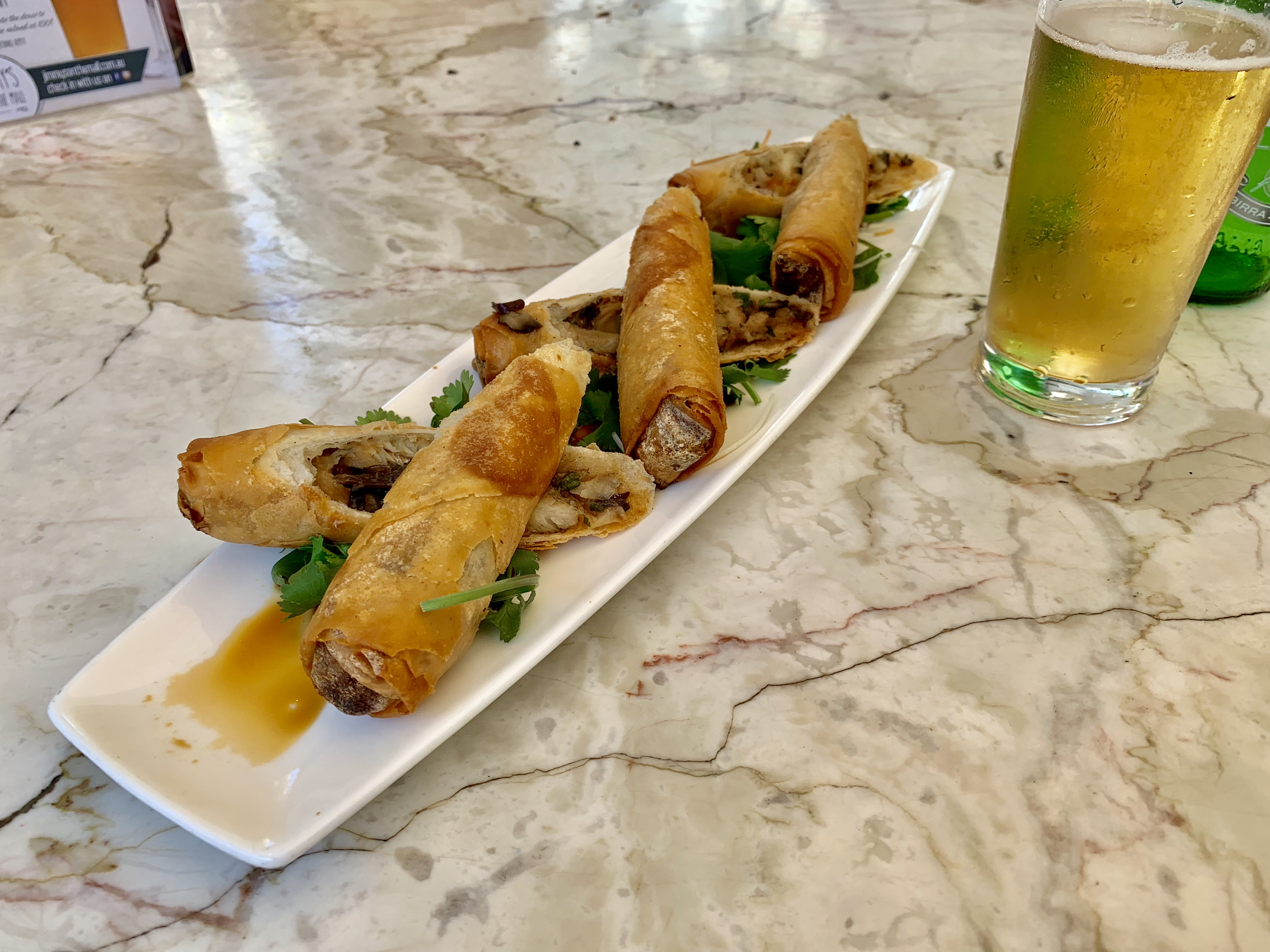
Spring rolls in Brisbane, Australia

==== Australia ====
In Australia, a diverse range of authentic Asian cuisine is available due to immigration, multiculturalism, and the abundant fresh local produce. Both dim sims and Chiko Rolls were inspired by Chinese spring rolls.

Small spring rolls that have either a vegetable filling, or a meat filling are a popular snack sold in many takeaway shops in Australia. Frozen spring rolls can also be purchased in supermarkets, to cook at home.

Australians also have their own version of a spring roll that can be found in many fish and chip shops in Australia and bought from a supermarket, which is the Chiko Roll. Rather than using pastry with a rolling technique, they have a more doughy texture.

=== Vanuatu ===
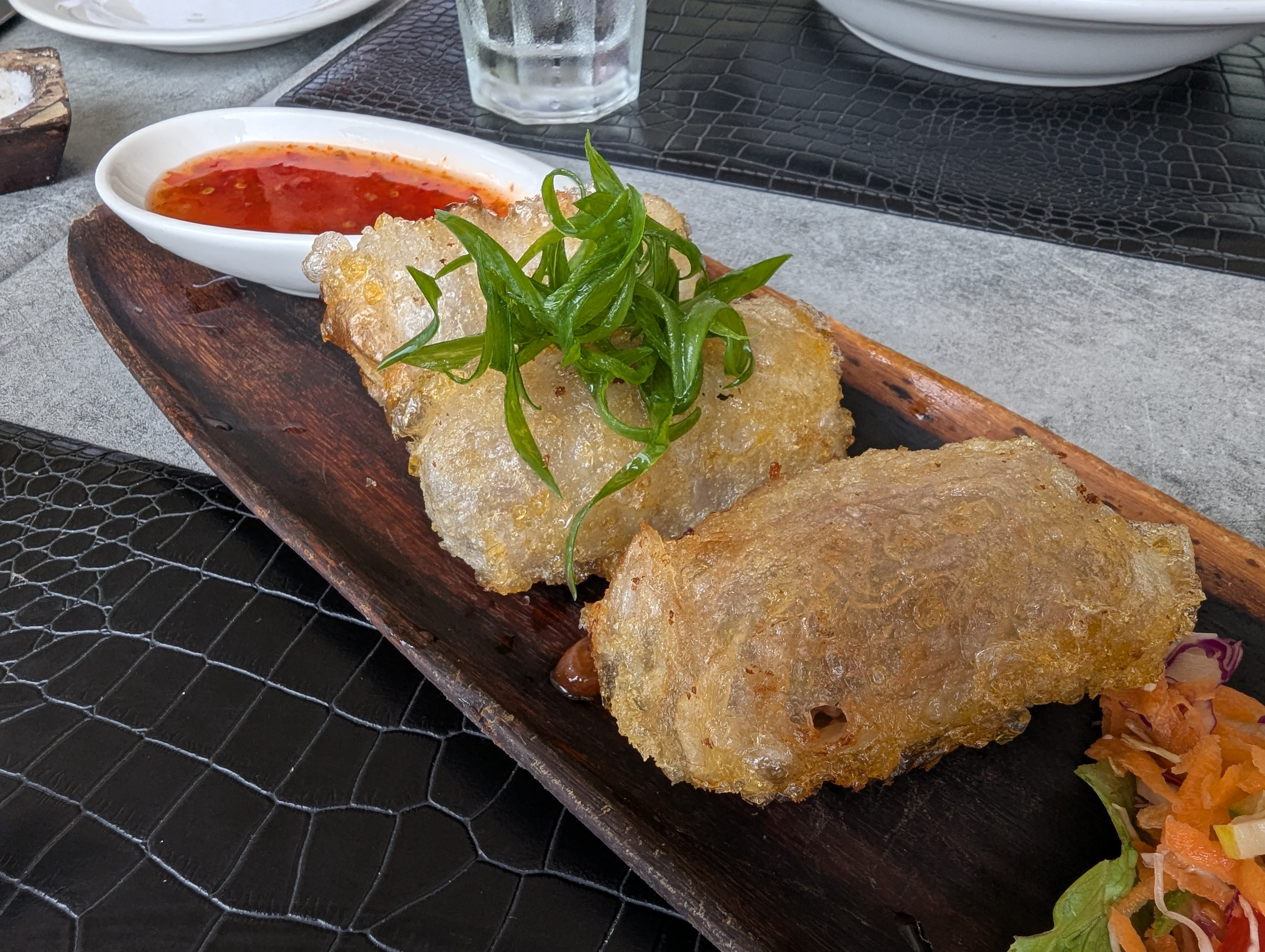
Vanuatu-style nems (deep-fried spring rolls), stuffed with minced beef

Spring rolls are a popular dish in modern Vanuatuan cuisine. Known as nems, from the Vietnamese name via French, they are typically made with rice paper, stuffed with pork, chicken or beef, and deep-fried.

=== Europe ===
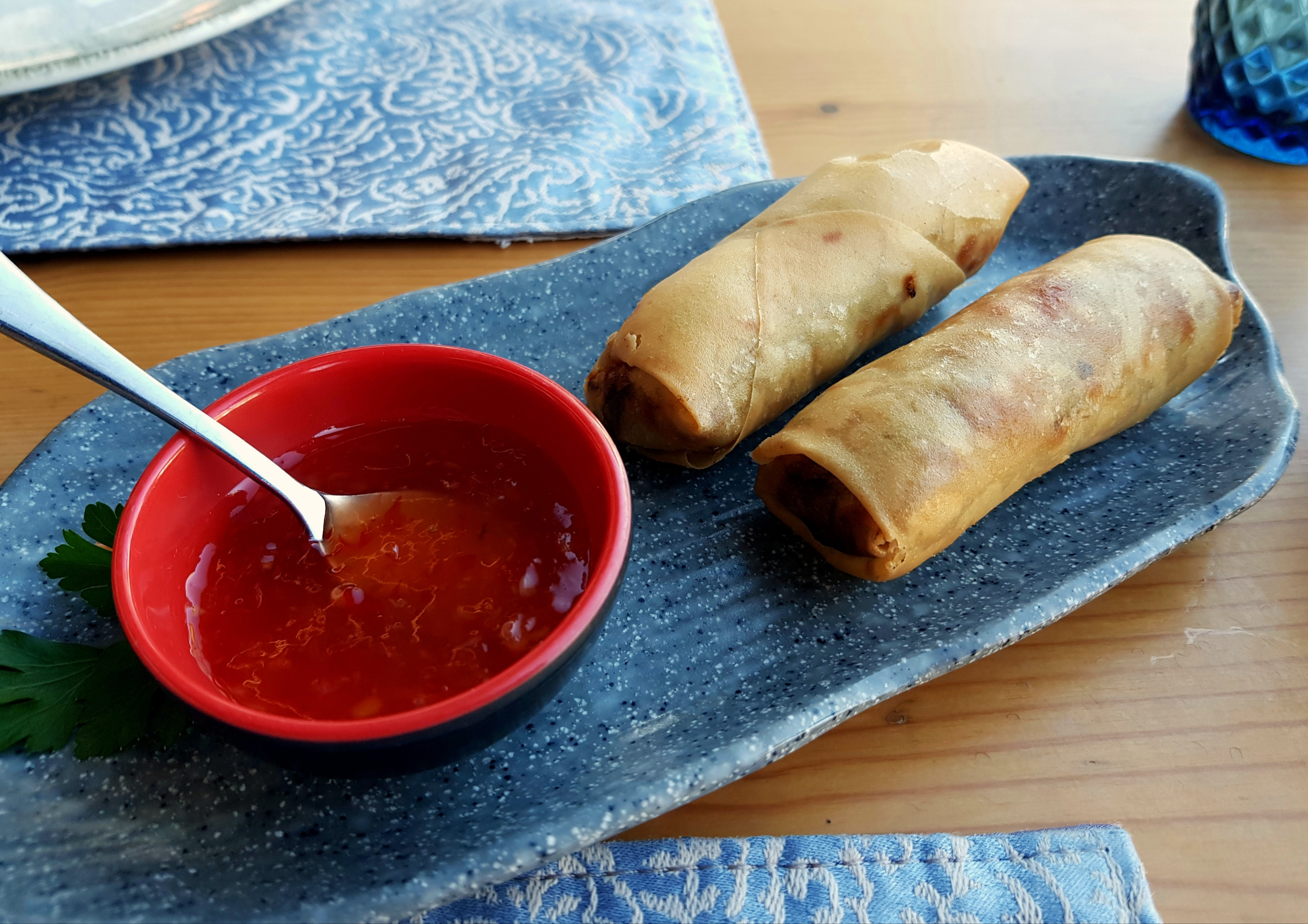
Spring rolls in Xàbia, Spain

==== Germany, France and Poland ====
In Austria, Switzerland, and Germany, deep-fried spring rolls are called Frühlingsrolle, while the Vietnamese salad rolls are called Sommerrolle ("summer roll"). The French call them nem for the fried ones and rouleaux de printemps for the others, whereas in Poland, they are known as sajgonki, named after Saigon, the city from which many of the Vietnamese immigrants in Poland originated.

==== Netherlands and Belgium ====
In the Netherlands and Belgium, spring rolls are known as loempia and are deep-fried or sometimes baked. They are thought to have been introduced by immigrants (including Chinese) from Indonesia, a former colony of the Netherlands. Loempias are filled with bean sprouts, chopped omelette, and sliced chicken or crab. It's also getting more common for loempias to appear with sweet and spicy sauces.

==== United Kingdom ====
In the United Kingdom spring rolls used to be, and sometimes still are, known as pancake rolls, though these tend to be somewhat larger than those described as spring rolls.

==== Northern Europe ====
In the Nordic countries, they are known as vårrullar/er (Swedish/Norwegian), forårsruller (Danish), or kevätkääryle (Finnish).

=== North America ===
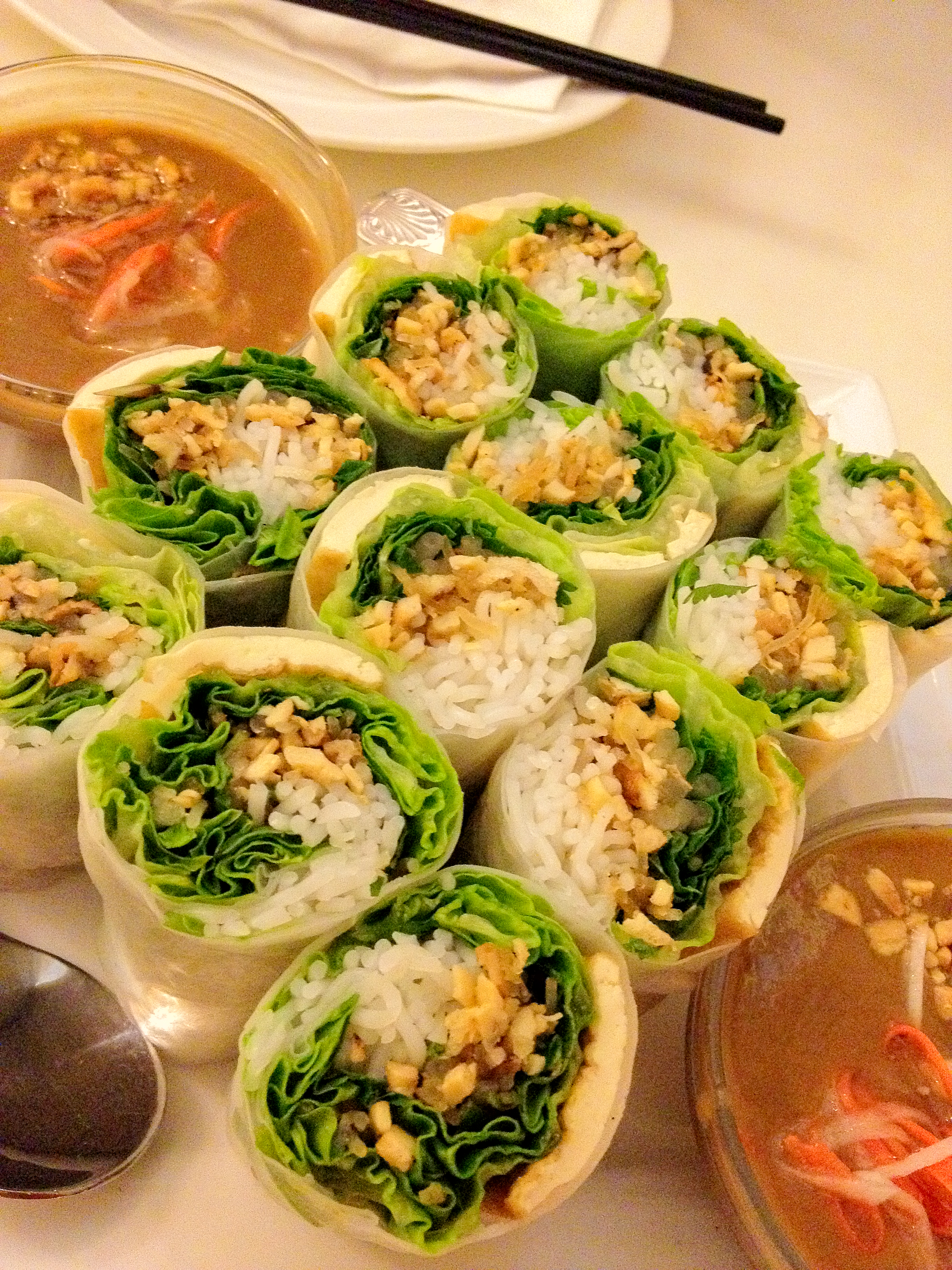
Spring rolls in San Francisco

==== United States ====
Madison, Wisconsin, has a hyper-local variety of spring roll unique to the city. In Madison, spring rolls are often served in an extra large format weighing between 1–1.5 lbs. These spring rolls, originally created by a Thai immigrant in 2006, are stuffed with cabbage, cilantro, iceberg lettuce, jalapeños, avocado, cucumbers and rice noodles. They can be found at numerous restaurants and food stalls in the city.

=== Latin America ===
==== Brazil ====
In Brazil, spring rolls are called either rolinhos-primavera (IPA: [ʁoˈlĩɲus pɾimɐˈvɛɾɐ]), which is an approximate free translation from English, or as it is called in Japanese restaurants and among people who are used to the plate by the way it came to Brazil from Japanese immigrants, "spring roll" (春巻き, harumaki) (IPA: [haɾɯmaki]). They can be found mostly in Chinese restaurants, usually served with a molho agridoce (sweet and sour sauce) to dip, usually bright red and hot, made with ketchup, vinegar, sugar and sometimes spices such as star anise, which accompanies some other kinds of dishes, and can include onion and sweet pepper. Some Japanese restaurants also serve spring rolls in Brazil, but generally plain or with soy sauce to dip (molho agridoce is also available in some). They are also found in buffet-like fast food restaurants, and can be called either by the Japanese or Brazilian Portuguese name, but most often the latter.

==== Chile ====
In Chile, spring rolls are called arrollado primavera, and supermarkets, street vendors and Chinese restaurants sell them. (However, in other countries, "arrollado primavera" refers to a savoury pinwheel-type roll made with thin sponge cake and should not be confused with the Chilean version.)

==== Costa Rica ====
In Costa Rica, spring rolls are called in Spanish rollito de primavera ("little spring roll"), but are popularly known as "Taco Chino" and are offered in almost all Chinese restaurants as an entree or appetizer.

==== Mexico ====
In Mexico, spring rolls are called rollos primavera (which translates directly to "spring rolls") and are sold in many Chinese restaurants and fast-food establishments accompanied with sweet and sour or soy sauces. On the northwest border with the US, especially in Mexicali, Baja California, the spring rolls are known as chunkun; this name could be related to the Korean chungwon (춘권). They are deep-fried and usually served with ketchup topped with a dot of hot mustard as a dipping sauce.

==== Argentina and Uruguay ====
In Argentina and Uruguay, spring rolls are commonly known as empanaditas chinas (Chinese turnover) and also arrolladitos primavera (which translates directly to "spring rolls"), and supermarkets and Chinese restaurants sell them. They are a common treat carried by catering services and are usually served with a small bowl of sweet and sour sauce to dip them in.

==== Venezuela ====
In Venezuela, spring rolls are called lumpia as in the Philippines and Indonesia. Many Chinese restaurants sell them, and they are usually served with sweet and sour or soy sauce.

== See also ==
- Egg roll
- Dim sum
- List of stuffed dishes
- Pastel
- Sambousa
- Summer roll
