= Bánh tráng trộn =

Vietnamese street food dish

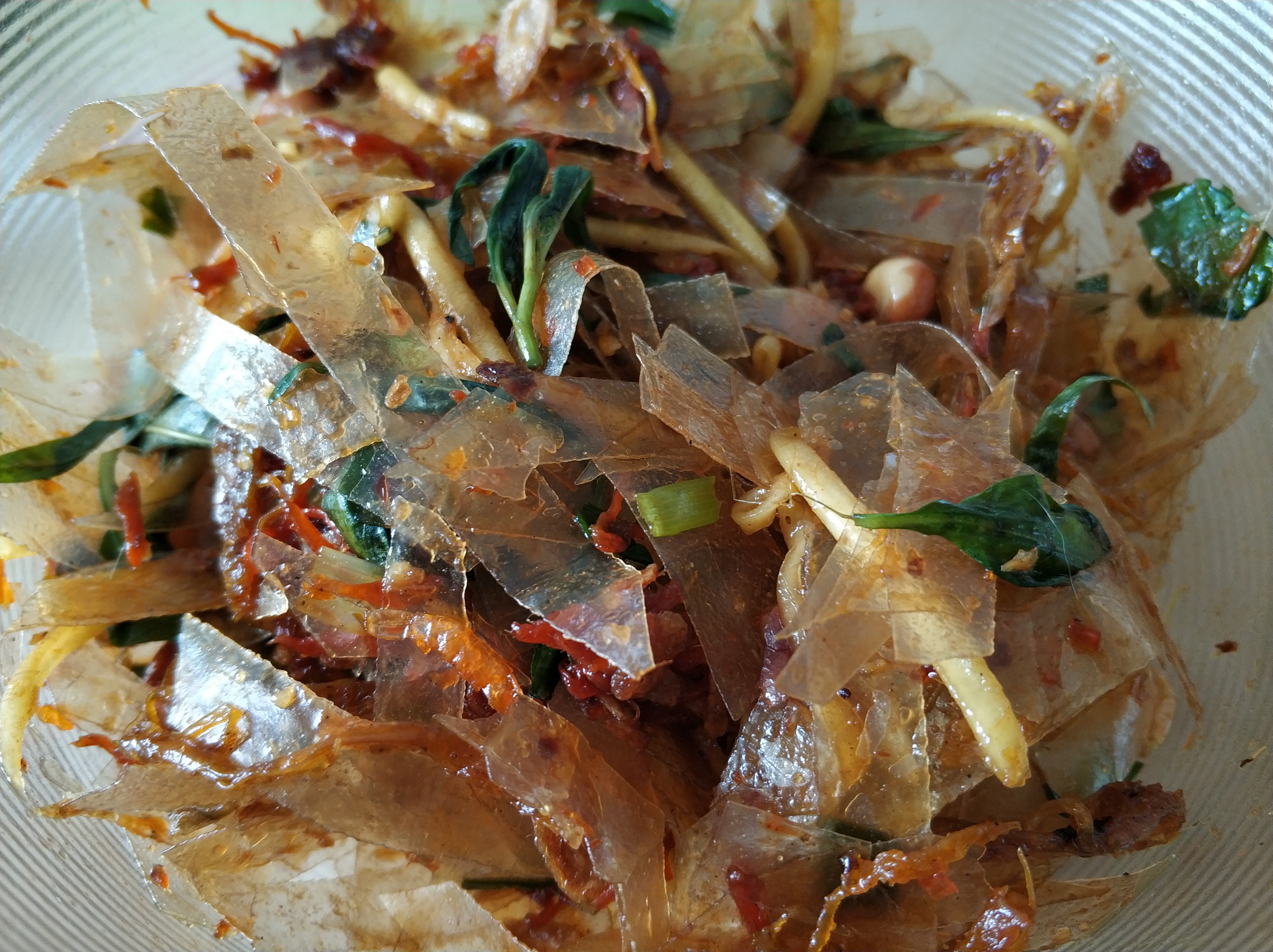
A dish of bánh tráng trộn

Bánh tráng trộn (lit. 'mixed rice paper' or 'rice paper salad'), is a popular Vietnamese street food made of bánh tráng mixing with a varieties of other ingredients. Originated as a snack for school students, bánh tráng trộn has since gained popularity in all over Vietnam and with oversea Vietnamese communities.

== Ingredients and variations ==
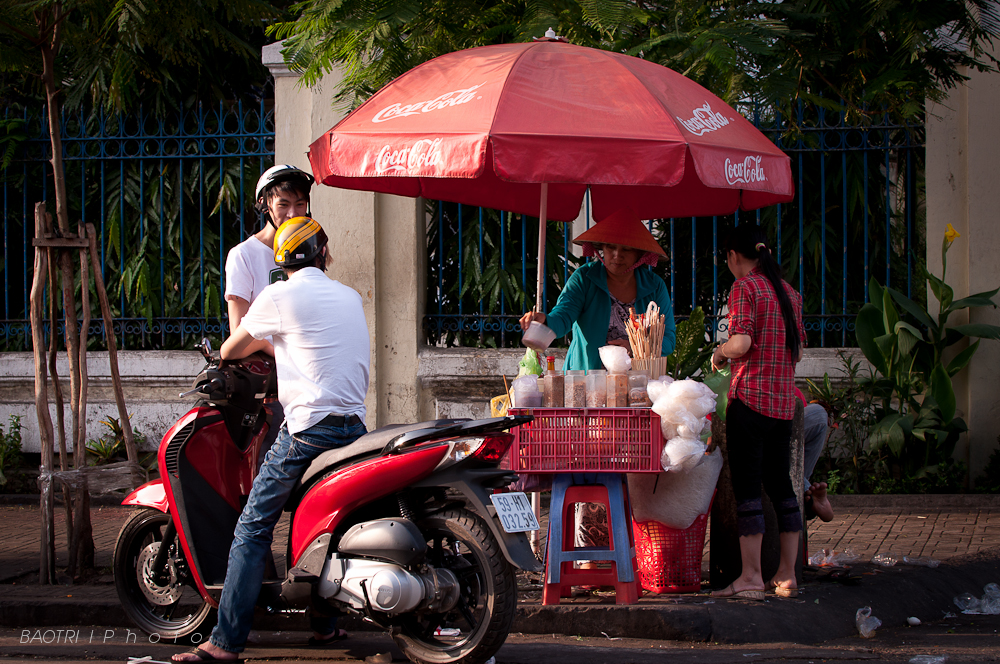
A food vendor selling bánh tráng trộn in Vietnam

Ingredients of bánh tráng trộn vary by region, however core ingredients typically consist of: rice paper strips/cuts, seasoned salt, chili powder, dried shrimp, flavoring oils and seasoned fried onions. Other popular ingredients are dried beef jerky strips, minced green mango, peanuts, fresh mint, basil, soft quail eggs and many kinds of sauces.

Bánh tráng trộn is a Vietnamese street food dish, where strips ofå rice paper are combined with green mango, Vietnamese coriander, shrimp salt, herbs and lime juice. Other ingredients might include dried beef or chicken floss, quail eggs, peanuts and other seasonings—combinations vary among preparations.

The mixture gives contrasting textures and flavors, to the chewy rice paper, ingredients like crunchy green mango, peanuts and fried shallots, and sour, salty and spicy seasonings.

Bánh tráng trộn is a popular food item in Vietnam and is sold as a street snack, where the bánh tráng is wrapped in plastic bags and served on skewers or chopsticks.

== In Vietnamese culture ==
Bánh tráng trộn is often considered as one of symbols of Vietnamese street food culture, particularly in Southern Vietnam, Tây Ninh and Ho Chi Minh City. The dish gains international exposure and can now be found in various countries around the world, such as Australia and the United States. In 2021, Miss Grand winner Nguyen Thuc Thuy Tien chose bánh tráng trộn as the representative food of Vietnam during her Miss Grand International pageant audition. Andrew Zimmern, a celebrity chef, has called bánh tráng trộn "Vietnam in a bag".
