= Milk rice paper =

Vietnamese culinary rice paper

Milk rice paper (or also called coconut milk rice paper) is a special type of the Vietnamese culinary rice paper, which was originated from Ben Tre province.

== Description ==
Milk rice paper is a steamed rice crepe sheet that has been dried. The shape of milk rice paper is similar to that of much regular Vietnamese rice paper: round and thin. However, milk rice paper type has milky color, while regular rice paper is translucent. Moreover, milk rice paper does not have the same chewy texture as regular rice paper and is thicker and harder.

== Ingredients ==
The basic ingredients used for making milk rice paper are: rice flour, cassava flour, water, salt, sugar, pandan leaves and coconut milk. The coconut milk is the key ingredient that ensures its distinctiveness. Additional ingredients such as durian, black sesame seeds, green rice, etc. are added to give it a variety of flavors.

== Usage ==
Milk rice paper can be used as either sweet or savory food, but the most commonplace way is to eat it as a sweet treat. Although milk rice paper cannot be combined with as many dishes as regular rice paper, people can still enjoy it straight out of the package or toasted on a fire to create a crunchier texture and bring out the coconut aroma.

== Traditional artisan villages ==
As the Vietnamese village of Ben Tre has recently become a popular tourist destination, milk rice paper – its specialty – is also becoming better known. However, rice paper manufacturing is not a very profitable industry, so many artisan villages are disappearing. In order to save them, the Vietnamese government has facilitated close cooperation between the artisan villages, which aims to sustainable survival and development.

Some famous artisan villages are Cu Lao May, My Long, and Cai Be. These villages still stick to the traditional production method of grinding rice, grating dried coconut, toasting sesame seeds, drying ingredients in the sunshine, etc. No additives are added. Thus, natural flavor is kept. Besides milk rice paper, these artisan villages also produce other products with various ingredients and usages such as rice paper with dried shrimps or with milk and eggs; rice paper for spring rolls or egg rolls, etc.

These artisan villages work all year around, but most of their earnings come in connection with the Tet holiday. During Tet, an average artisan family makes a few hundred sheets per day, which means the productivity during this period is three times higher than in the normal season.

Normally, with every 20 kilos of batter, 500-600 milk rice paper sheets can be produced.

== Appliance of technology in production ==
Just a few years ago, the production process was still old-fashioned, relying mainly on menial labor and experience handed down from generation to generation. Therefore, productivity and consistency in quality and quantity was not guaranteed. Increasingly, modern machines such as gristmills, electric coconut graters, kneading and mangle machines for the batter, cutting machines for the finished rice paper and vacuum machines for packing are used to increase output. The machines also increase the consistency of shape and flavor, and improve preservation and hygiene.

== See also ==
- Bánh tráng
