= Bánh tráng nướng =

Vietnamese rice flour dish

bánh tráng nướng (bánh đa nướng)
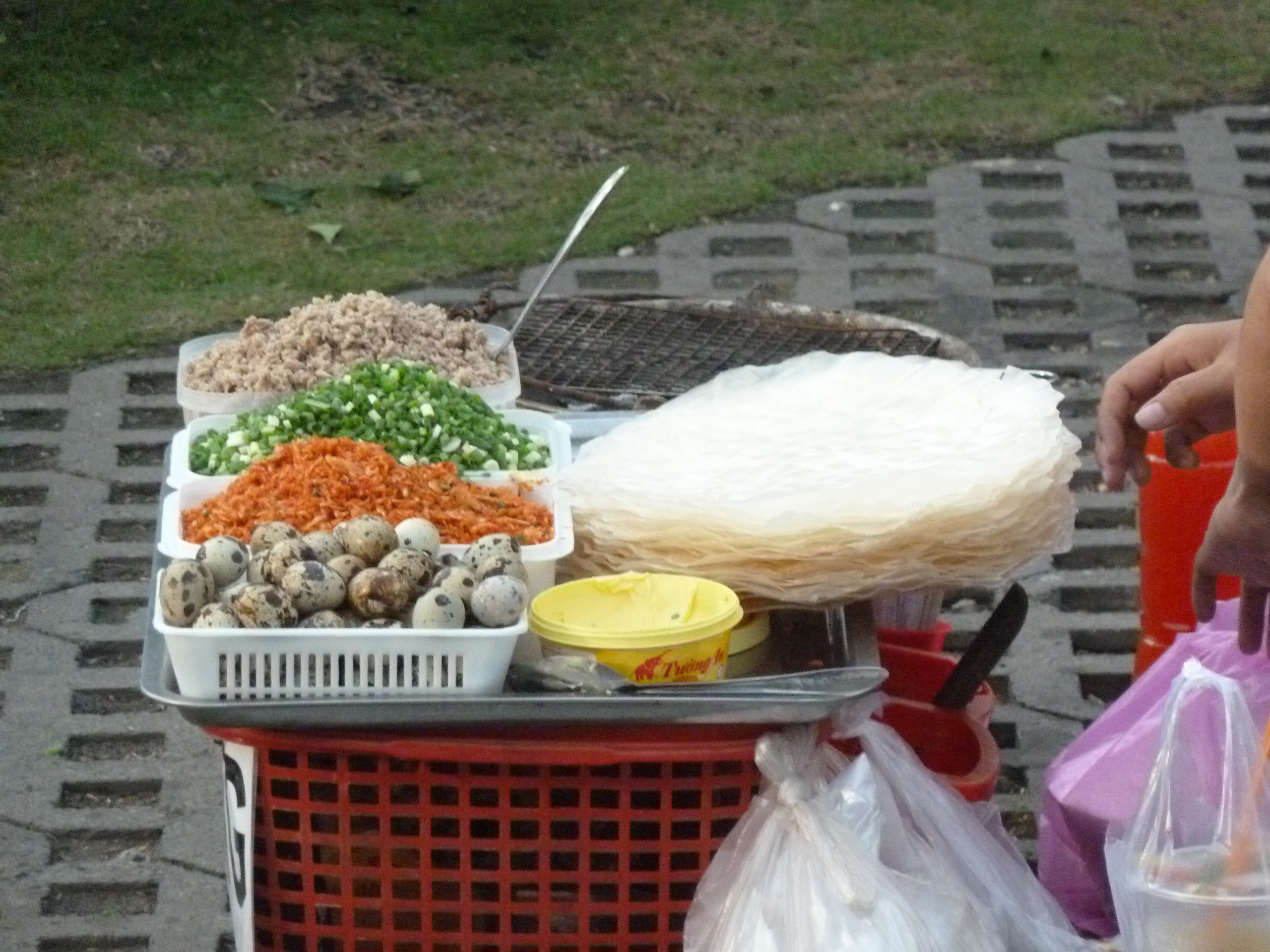
- Modern-style bánh tráng nướng sold in Ho Chi Minh City
- Country or region: Ho Chi Minh City, Lâm Đồng province
- Country or region: Vietnam

In Vietnamese cuisine, bánh tráng nướng (lit. 'grilled' or 'roasted bánh tráng') or bánh đa nướng is a type of bánh tráng or grilled rice cracker consumed in Vietnam.

Traditionally, bánh tráng nướng mè were large, round, thick rice crackers with sesame seeds, which could easily be shattered into smaller pieces. They can be eaten separately, although they are most commonly added into the vermicelli noodle dishes like cao lầu and mì Quảng. In recent years, modern street-food versions of bánh tráng nướng have become popular, featuring rice paper grilled with a wide variety of toppings.

They are particularly popular in Đà Lạt, Lâm Đồng province and Ho Chi Minh City, Vietnam. In addition, this dish has spread to Hanoi and other urban areas, where it is commonly sold near schools and night markets.

A Vietnamese household in Đà Lạt making bánh tráng nướng

Common toppings include: eggs, ground pork, dried shrimp or fermented shrimp paste, fried shallots, pork floss, scallion oil, hot chili sauce and mayo. Other variations may also include chicken, beef, cheese, butter, spam, or sausage. More recent variations include corn, seafood, French fries, ham, and pizza-style cheese.

Many variations of bánh tráng nướng exist, including ones with clear sesame seeds, prawn-like crackers with dried spring onions, and sweet milk.

== See also ==
- List of crackers
- Bánh tráng
