= Bánh tráng phơi sương =

Bánh tráng paper

The bánh tráng phơi sương (lit. ''dew-wetted rice paper'') is a special food of Lộc Du, Trảng Bàng District, Tây Ninh Province, Vietnam. It is a flexible two-layer rice paper.

== Process of production ==
There are seven steps in making the dish: steeping the rice, husking the rice, mixing the flour, spreading the flour, drying the rice paper in the sun, grilling the rice paper and wetting the paper by dew in the night. Commonly used rice strains are Bằng Cóc rice, So Miên rice or Nàng Miên rice. Rice is soaked in water equal to the volume of rice. If it is soaked too long, the rice will lose its fragrance. The soaked rice is mixed with salt and grilled, spread over a flat pan in a very thin round shape. When spreading, the water temperature must be kept constant. The next piece is spread over the pan just as the last piece is removed, and skilled workers time the rice paper cooking process by smelling the smoke. Next, the rice paper is spread over a bamboo grid and left to dry in the sun, and wind. If the rice paper is left to dry too long, it will be brittle, but if not left to dry long enough, it will be tough. The rice paper is then grilled over a fire of peanut shells, and the cooks turn the rice paper over regularly to prevent it from being burned or smoke-stained. When night dews begin to drop, the rice paper is left outside to be wetted by the dew; the length of time it is left outside depends on the amount of dew which falls that day.

== Spring roll wrap ==
Spring roll paper is used for making fresh summer rolls (salad rolls) or fried spring rolls in Vietnamese cuisine, where the rice paper is called bánh tráng or bánh tráng phơi sương. Ingredients of the food rice paper include white rice flour (95.5%), tapioca flour, salt (1.5%), and water (3%). The tapioca powder makes the rice paper glutinous and smooth. It is usually sold dried in thin, crisp, translucent round sheets that are wrapped in cellophane. The sheets are dipped briefly in hot water to soften them, then wrapped around savory or sweet ingredients.

Nutrition Information	Quantity per Serving	Quantity per 100g
Energy	425Kcal	126Kcal
Protein	5.5g	1.5g
Fat, total	0g	0g
Saturated	0g	0g
Carbodydrate	107g	28.5g
Sugar	0g	0g
Sodium	950mg	253mg

== Summer roll ==
People wrap rice paper around a range of ingredients: pork simmered in coconut water, and a variety of vegetables, such as cucumber, coriander, Thai basil, spearmint, houttuynia cordata, peppermint or perilla. People serve it with sweet and sour fish sauce.
