= Chả giò =

Vietnamese spring roll

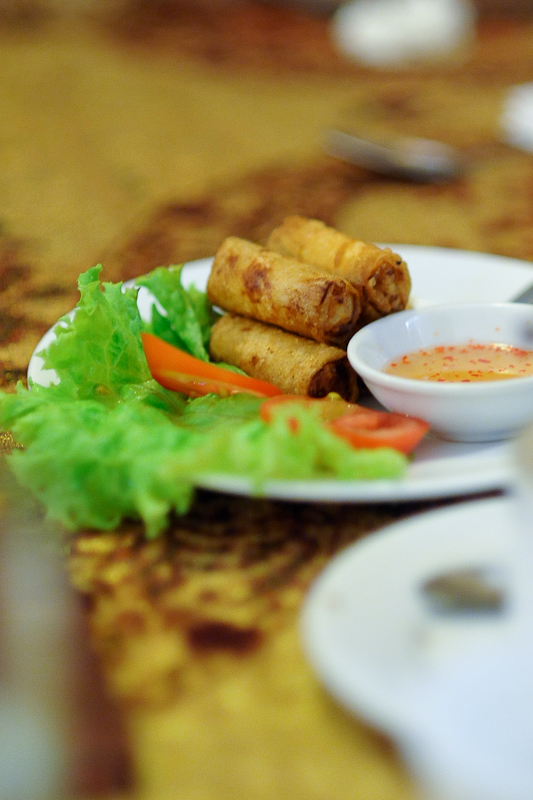
- Alternative names: Nem rán, imperial roll, Vietnamese fried roll
- Course: Hors d'oeuvre
- Place of origin: Nam Kỳ
- Associated cuisine: Vietnamese
- Main ingredients: Ground pork, mushrooms, cellophane noodles, various julienned vegetables (carrots, kohlrabi, jicama), Bánh tráng

Chả giò (Vietnamese: [ca˧ˀ˦˥ zɔ˨˩]), or nem rán (Vietnamese: [neʲm˧ ʐan˧˥]), also known as fried spring roll, is a popular dish in Vietnamese cuisine and usually served as an appetizer in Europe, North America, and Australia, where there are large communities of the Vietnamese diaspora. It is ground meat, usually pork, wrapped in rice paper and deep-fried.

== Ingredients ==
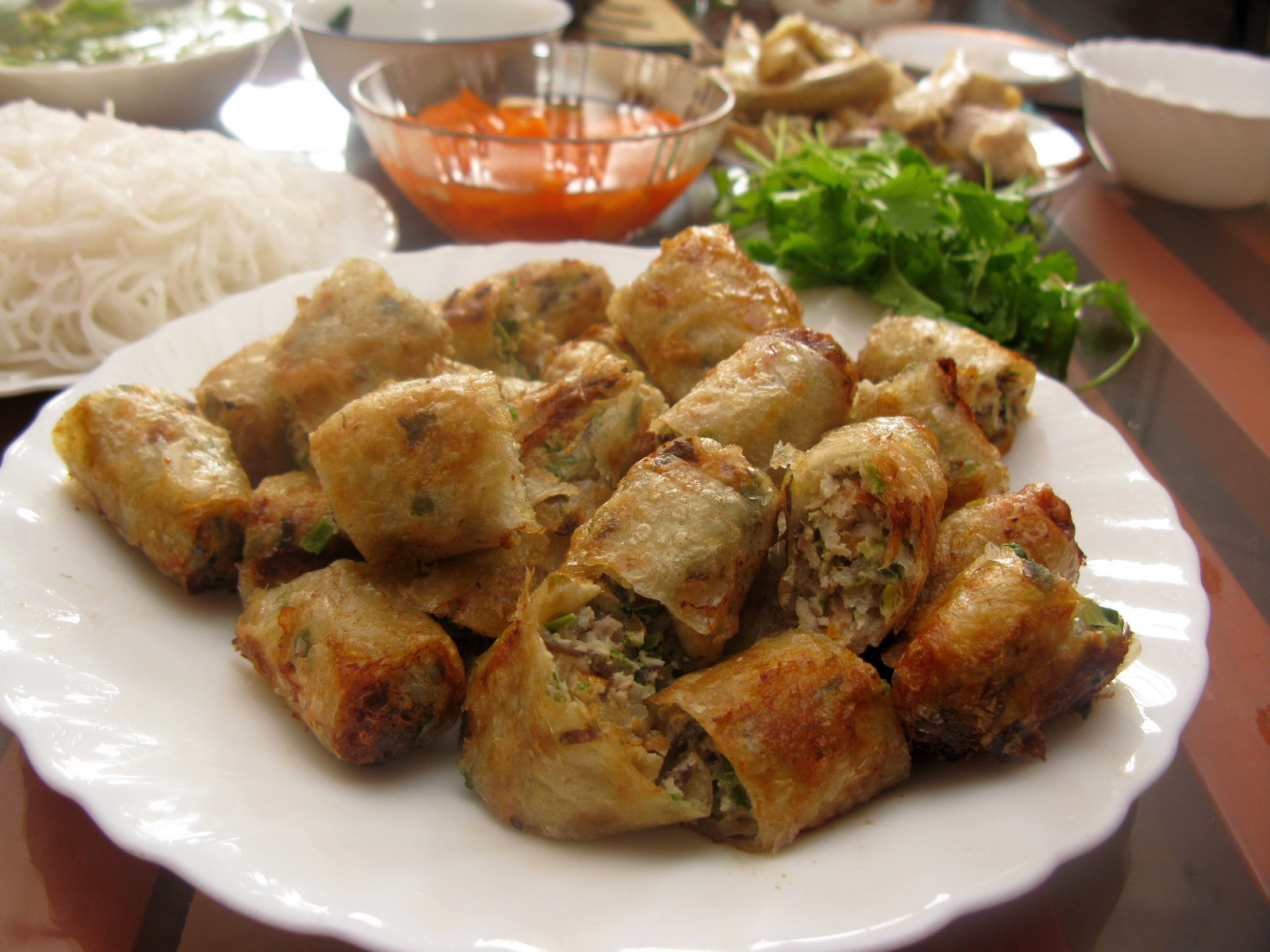
Chả giò (Northern style)

The main structure of a roll of chả giò is commonly seasoned ground meat, mushrooms, vermicelli, and diced vegetables such as carrots, kohlrabi and jicama, rolled up in a sheet of moist rice paper. The roll is then deep-fried until the rice paper coat turns crispy and golden brown.

The ingredients are not fixed. The most commonly used meat is pork, but one can also use crab, shrimp, chicken, and sometimes snails (in northern Vietnam), and tofu (for vegetarian chả giò, also known as chả giò chay). If diced carrots and jicama are used, the stuffing is slightly crunchy, matching the crispy fried rice paper, but the juice from these vegetables can cause the rolls to soften after a short time. If the rolls are to be stored for a long time, mashed sweet potato or mung beans may be used instead to keep the rolls crispy. One may also include bean sprouts and rice vermicelli. Eggs and various spices can be added to one's preference. Sometimes, the ingredients can include julienned taro root and carrots if jicama cannot be found. Taro roots give it a fatty and crunchy taste.

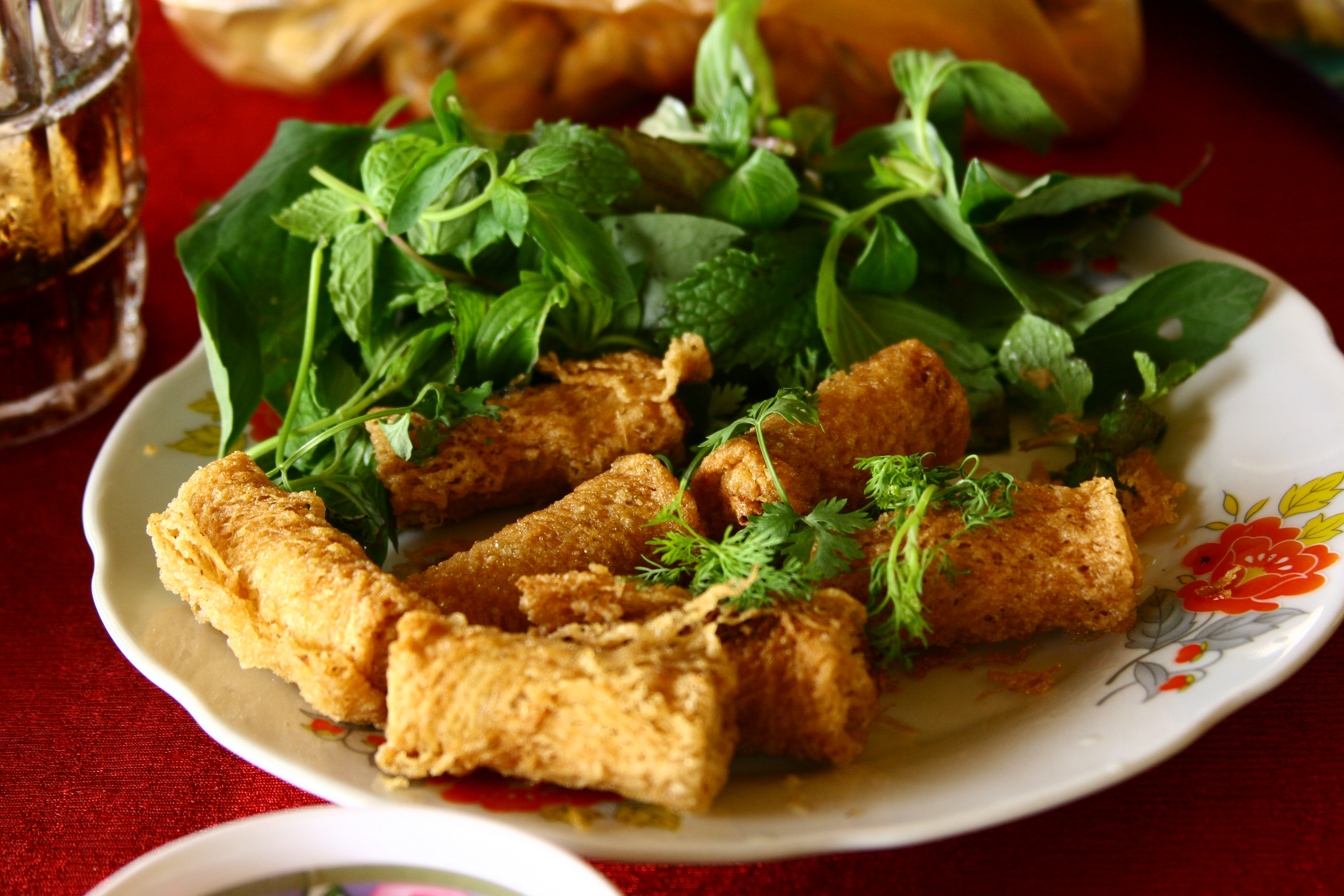
Chả giò rế

Chả giò rế is an uncommon kind of chả giò that uses bánh hỏi (thin rice vermicelli woven into a sheet) instead of rice paper. The stuffing inside the roll is the same as normal chả giò, and the roll is also deep-fried. As the sheets of bánh hỏi are narrow, and the rice vermicelli strands are brittle, chả giò rế rolls are often small and difficult to make. They are only seen at large parties and restaurants.

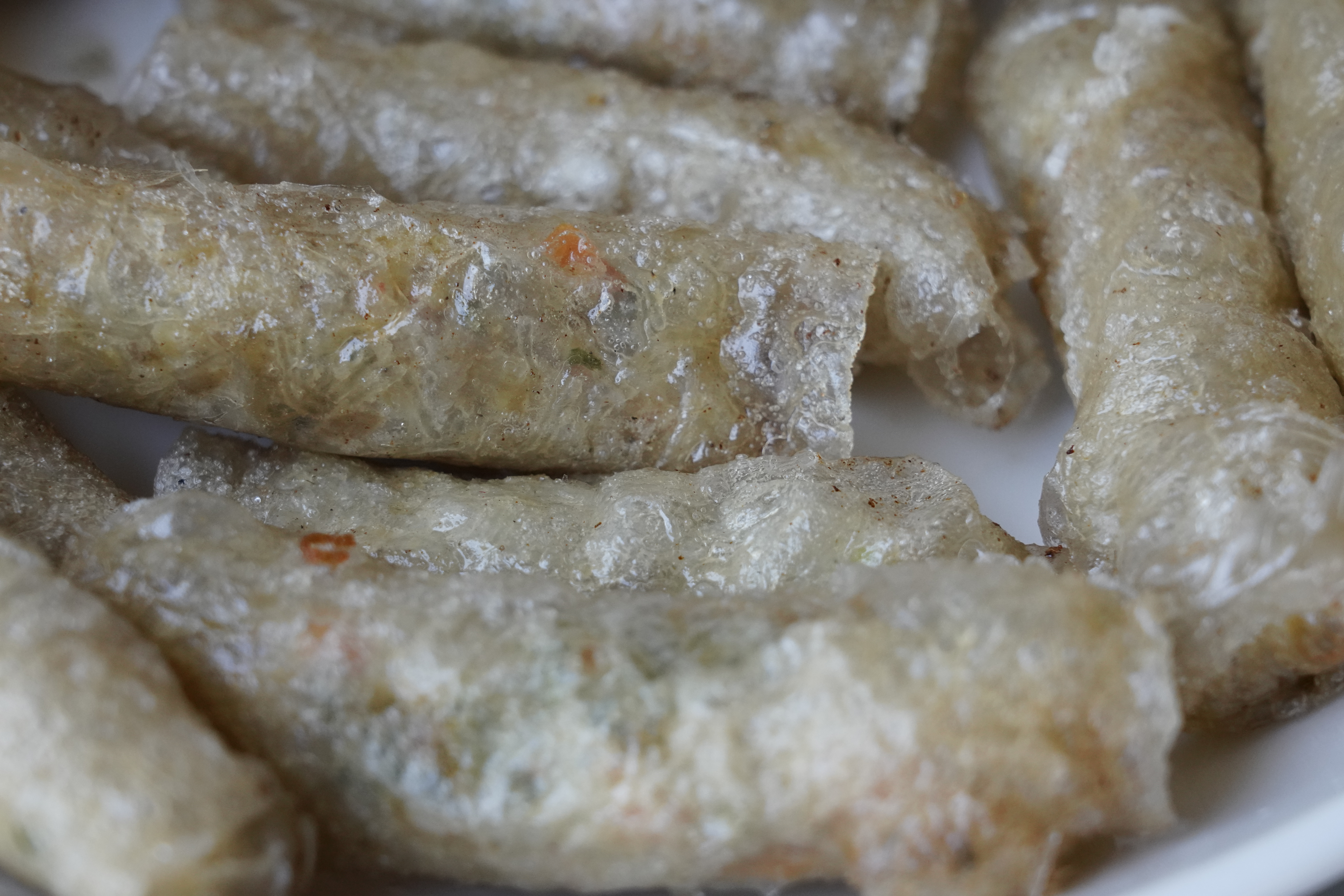
Chả giò at World Heritage Cuisine Summit & Food Festival 2018

== Condiments ==
Chả giò can be eaten by itself, dipped into nước chấm or nước mắm pha (fish sauce mixed with lime juice or vinegar, water, sugar, garlic and chili pepper), or served with rice vermicelli (in bún chả giò). Usually it is served with a dish of rau sống (raw vegetable) containing several kinds of vegetable such as lettuce, coriander, etc. It is very common to wrap the chả giò in lettuce before eating it.

== Confusion with other varieties of rolls ==
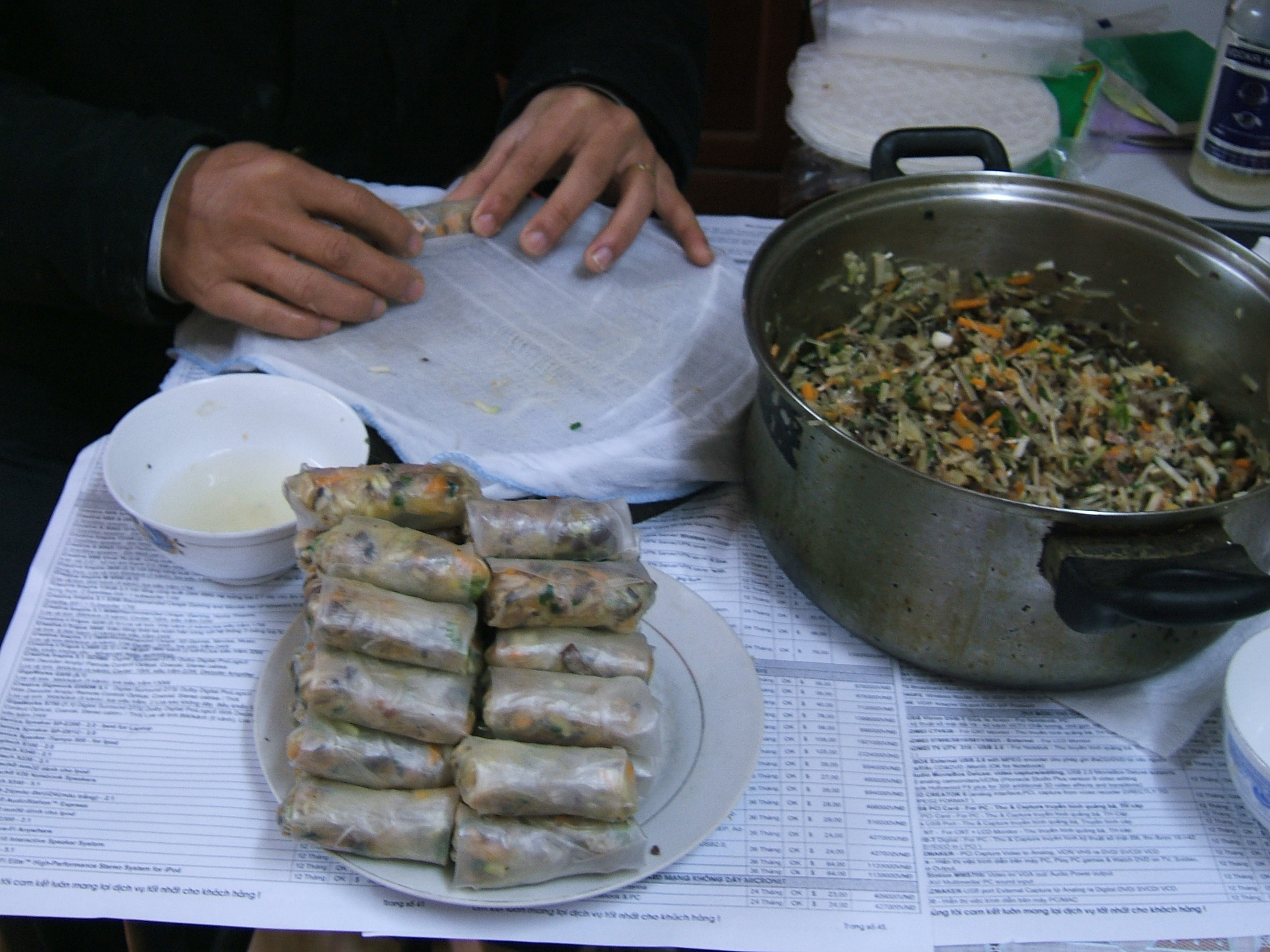
A woman is wrapping nem to prepare for frying.

There can often be confusion as to what exactly is meant by nem depending on the circumstances. In Vietnam, there can be confusion between northerners and southerners because northerners tend to use the term nem to refer to a variety of different rice paper rolls containing meat, including gỏi cuốn, which northerners call nem cuốn (often referred to in Western restaurants as "salad rolls"). The southerners, however, tend to adopt a more narrow definition of nem, using the word nem to only refer to ground meat food items like nem nướng (literally "grilled sausage", a minced pork sausage mixed infused with crushed garlic and fish sauce and then grilled).

Further confusion can occur outside of Vietnam because the English translation of chả giò varies according to restaurants' menus, chả giò is often confused with other dishes, such as egg rolls or salad rolls. As chả giò made with bánh tráng can easily be shattered when fried, and also stay crispy for only a few hours, restaurants outside of Vietnam have adopted wheat flour sheet to make chả giò, in place of rice paper, thus blurring the difference between chả giò and the Chinese egg roll. Besides that, there is also a kind of roll called nem cua bể (crab spring roll). Crab spring roll is considered the two most representative dishes for the culinary processing style of Hai Phong people and has main ingredients made from crab meat, mushroom, carrots and some other vegetables then fried and served with vermicelli, vegetables.

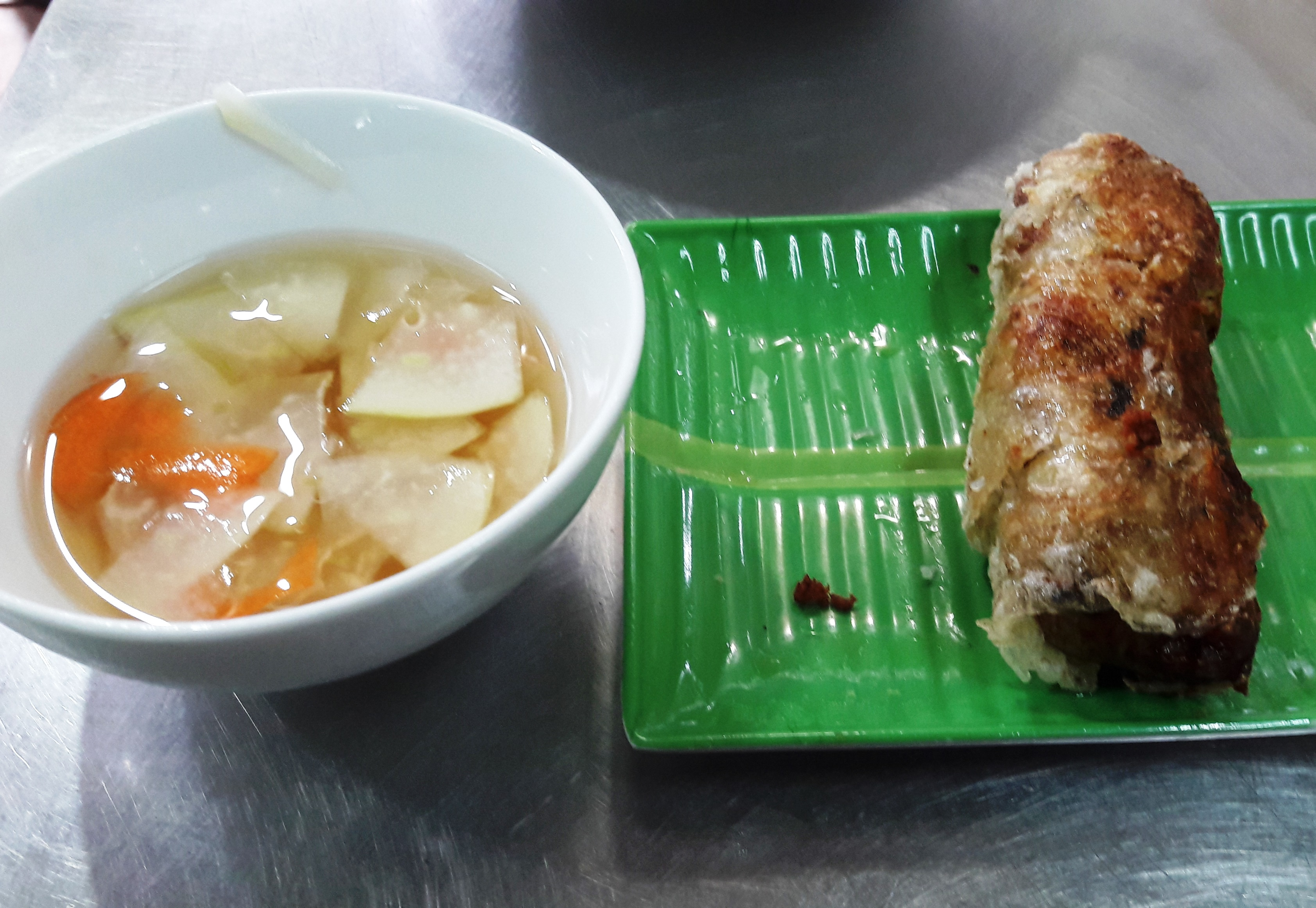
Nem cua bể Haiphong

== See also ==
- Gỏi cuốn
- List of stuffed dishes
