= Bánh tráng =

Edible Vietnamese culinary wrapper

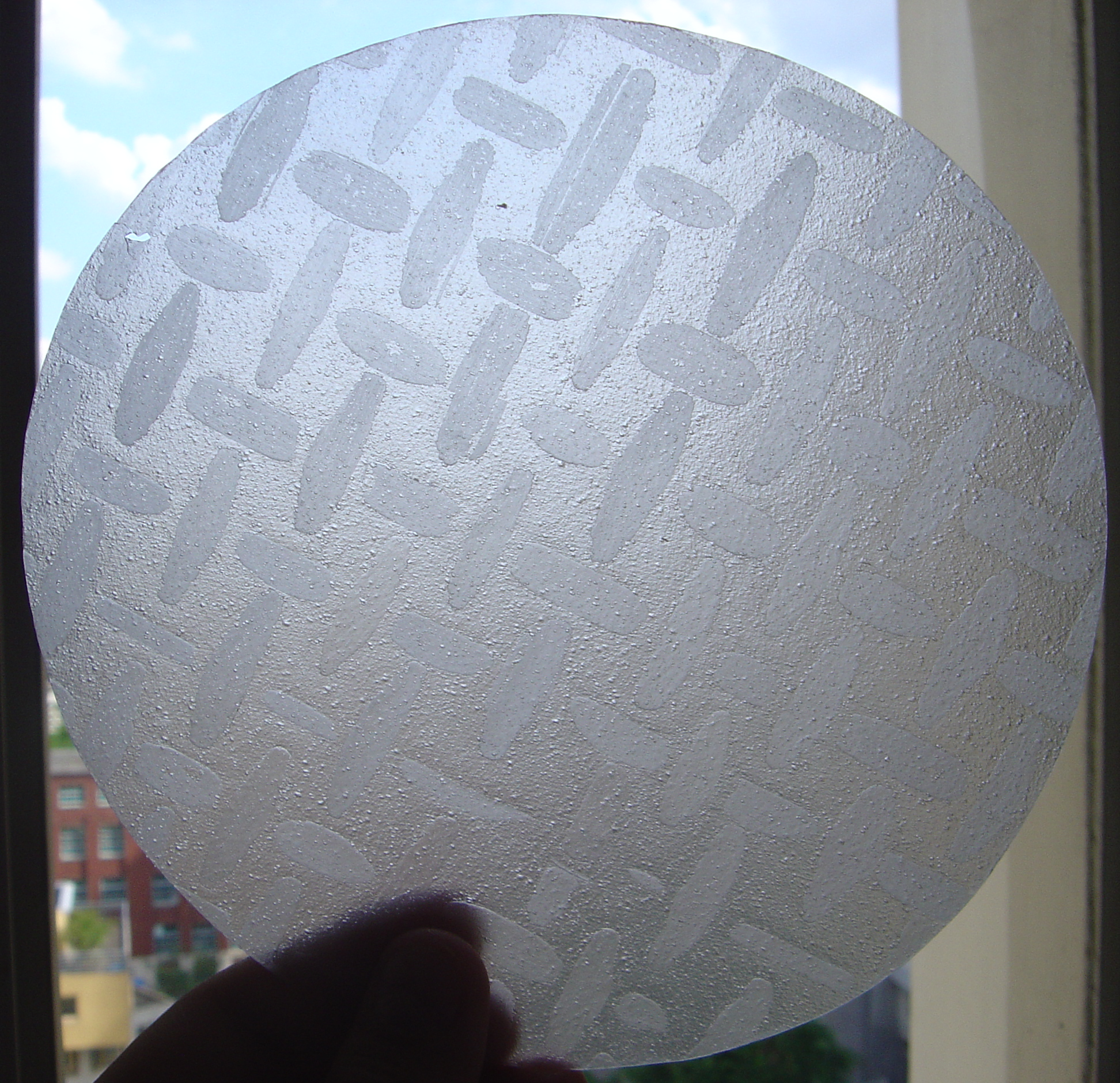
- A bánh tráng wrapper
- Type: Edible wrapper
- Place of origin: Vietnam
- Region or state: Regions of Vietnam
- Main ingredients: Rice flour, tapioca, maize, mungbean, potato, and sweet potato starch (varied), and various ingredients, including spices
- Variations: Thin, soft to thick, depending on the type of banh trang

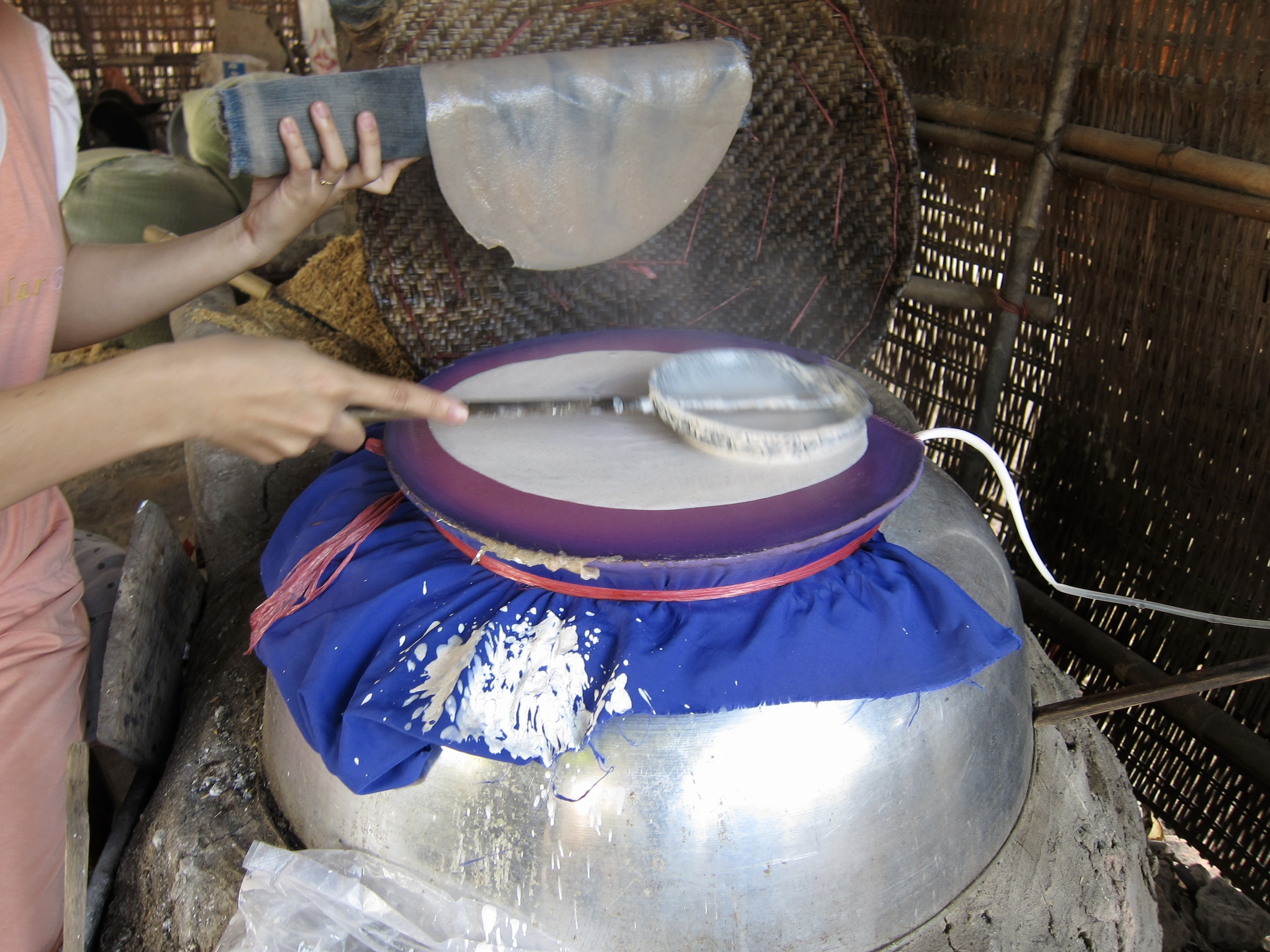
Spreading and steaming rice paper

Bánh tráng (Vietnamese: [ɓǎɲ ʈ͡ʂǎŋ]), a Vietnamese term (literally, coated bánh), sometimes called rice paper wrappers, rice crepes, rice wafers or nem wrappers, are edible Vietnamese wrappers used in Vietnamese cuisine, primarily in finger foods and appetizers such as Vietnamese nem dishes. The term rice paper wrappers can sometimes be a misnomer, as some banh trang wrappers are made from rice flour supplemented with tapioca flour or sometimes replaced completely with tapioca starch. The roasted version is bánh tráng nướng.

== Description ==
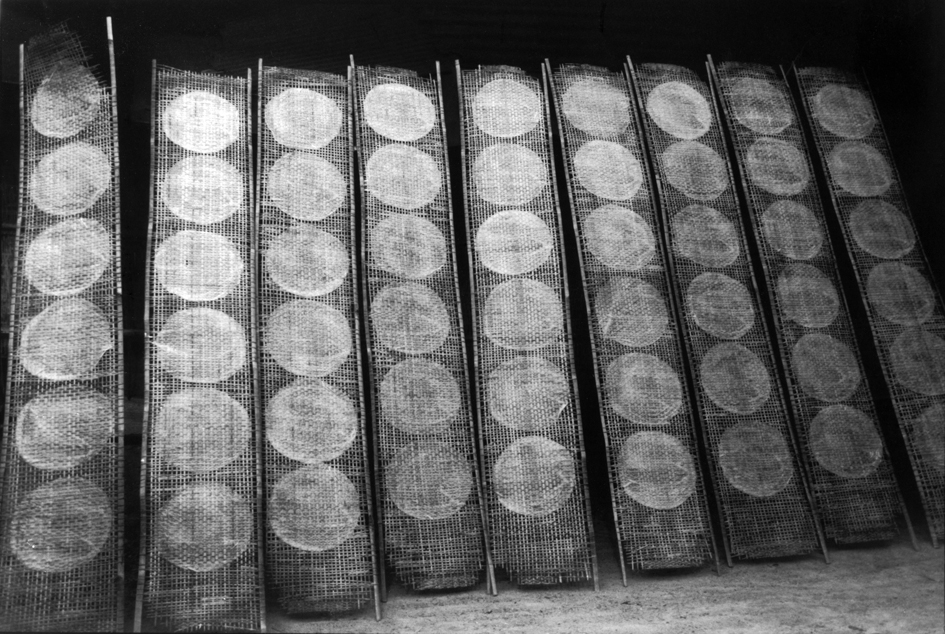
Banh trang production in Vietnam

Vietnamese banh trang are rice paper wrappers that are edible. They are made from steamed rice batter, then sun-dried. A more modern method is to use machines that can steam and dry the wrapper for a thinner and more hygienic product, suitable for the export market.

== Types ==
Vietnamese banh trang wrappers come in various textures, shapes and types. Textures may vary from thin, soft to thick (much like a rice cracker). Banh trang wrappers come in various shapes, though circular and squared shapes are most commonly used. A plethora of local Vietnamese ingredients and spices are added to Vietnamese banh trang wrappers for the purpose of creating different flavors and textures, such as sesame seeds, chili, coconut milk, bananas, and durian.

Types include:

Bánh tráng
Southern Vietnamese term for rice wrappers, which are also commonly used overseas. These banh trang wrappers are made from a mixture of rice flour with tapioca starch, water and salt. These wrappers are thin and light in texture. They are often used for chả giò and gỏi cuốn. There are also certain rice wrappers products that are specifically for frying.
Bánh đa nướng (grilled rice cracker)
Bánh đa nướng are roasted or grilled rice crackers. Some are thicker than the standard rice wrappers and can also include sesame seeds. It is often used in dishes like mì Quảng as a topping.
Bánh đa nem (vỏ ram / bánh ram)

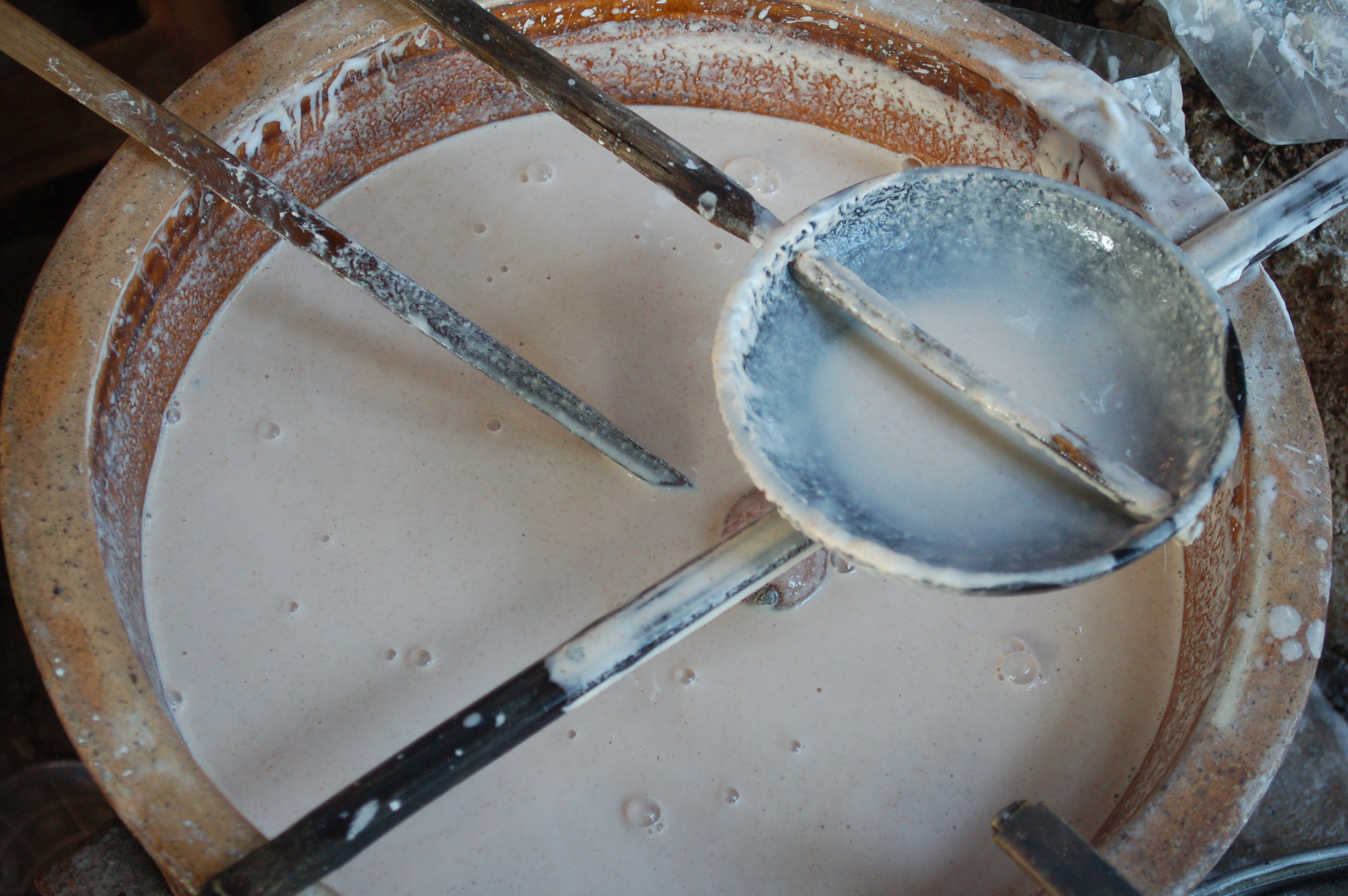
Batter and tools for making rice paper by hand

This is a northern Vietnamese term for rice paper. There is a special variety that contains only rice flour and no tapioca starch, water and salt. Brown bánh đa nem may contain cane syrup (mật mía). These wrappers are very thin and translucent. They also do not require to be soaked with water before usage. When fried, they are crispier and not as chewy like its southern counterpart. It is used as a wrapper when making nem cua bể.
Bánh tráng rế (woven banh trang)
These banh trang wrappers are made from rice flour, green beans, vegetable oil and salt. These wrappers are delicate and thin. They are lacy, net-like wrappers typically used for deep-fried cha gio rolls.

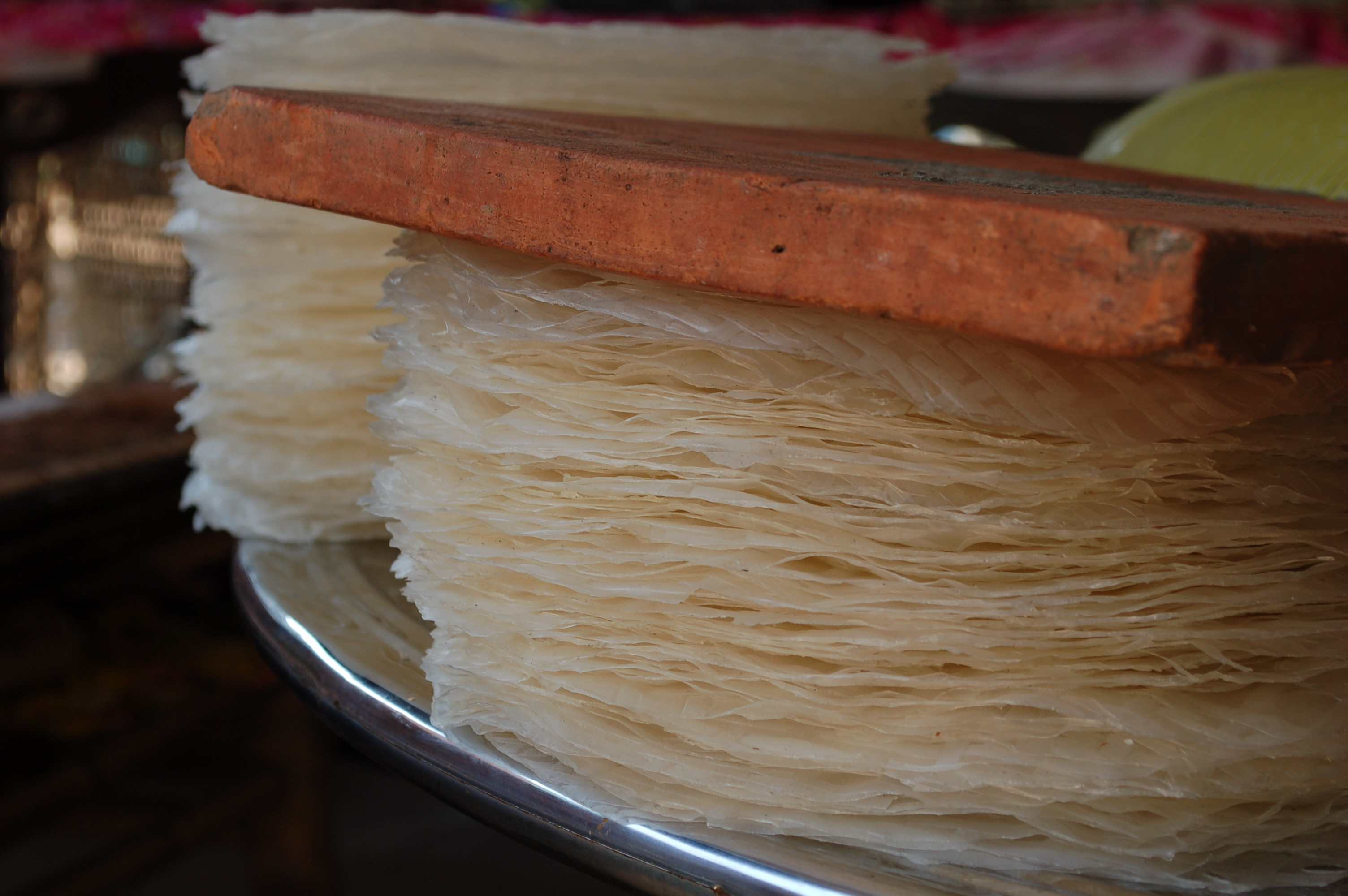
Pressing newly dried rice paper

Bánh tráng mè (Sesame banh trang)
These banh trang wrappers are typically made from rice starch, then adding sesame seeds. Its texture resembles that of a rice cracker.
Bánh tráng tôm mè (Sesame-shrimp banh trang)
These banh trang wrappers are made by adding sesame seeds and dried shrimps. Its texture resembles that of a rice cracker.
Bánh tráng sữa (Milky banh trang)
Bánh tráng sữa are made by adding milk. This type of banh trang is softer, and supposed to melt on your tongue.
Bánh tráng dẻo
Bánh tráng dẻo are soft and malleable sheets. They also come in different flavors.
Bánh tráng mỏng (thin bánh tráng)
Thin sheets made from only tapioca starch. They are dried and translucent and are more sticky when activated with water.
Bánh tráng dừa (Coconut flavored banh trang)
These banh trang wrappers are typically made by adding coconut milk, sugar, rice flour, sesame seeds, and water. The texture resembles that of a cracker, similar to the sesame banh trang.
Bánh tráng phơi sương
Bánh tráng phơi sương are wrappers with flexible two layered rice paper.
Bánh tráng trộn (Mixed rice paper)
Mixed rice paper has the main ingredient is rice paper cut yarn, mixed with fried dried shrimp with fat.

== Culinary uses ==
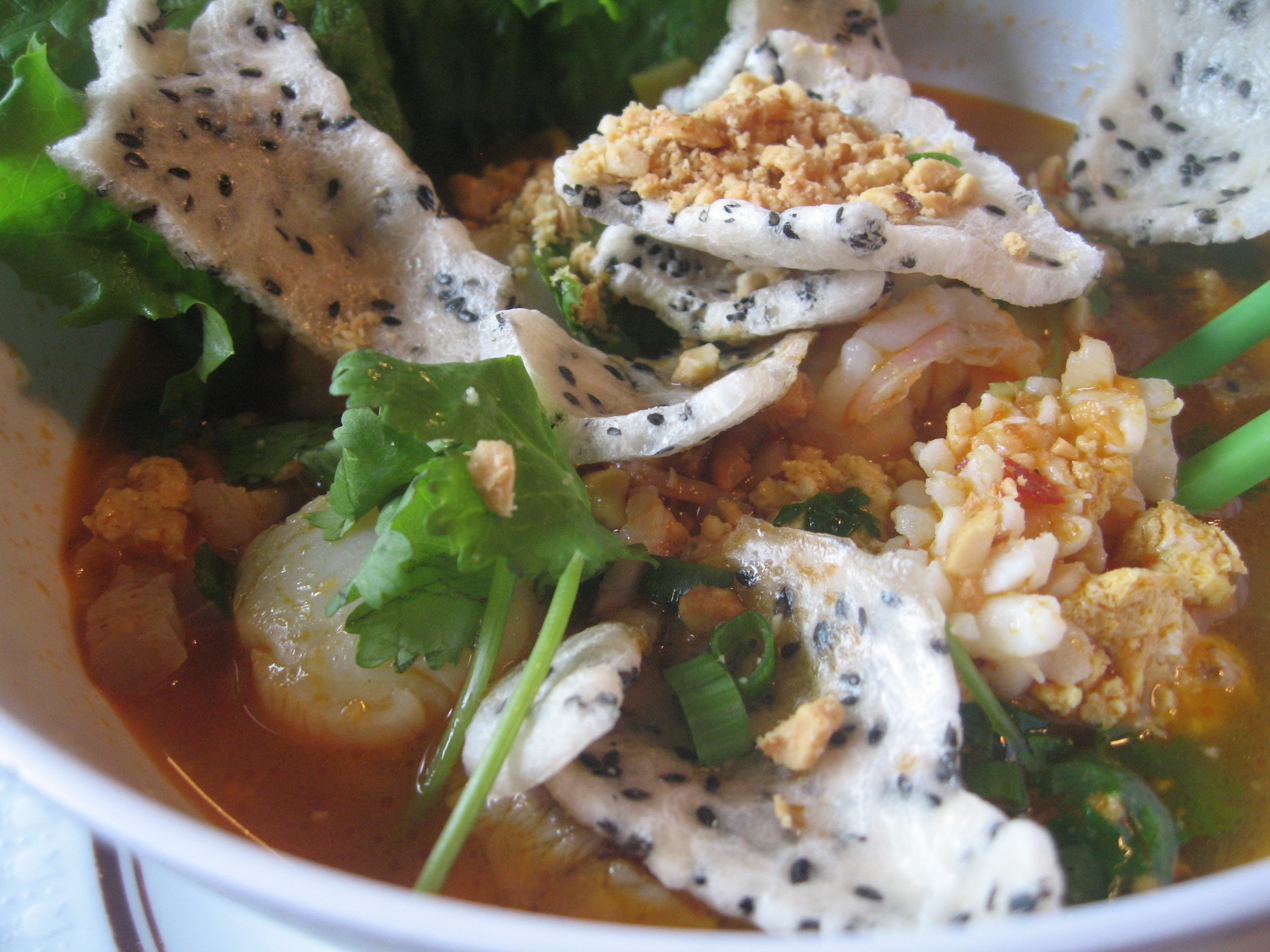
Baked sesame banh trang topped in mi Quang

Banh trang wrappers are typically used in Vietnamese nem dishes. These wrappers are eaten dried (khô), fried (rán), baked (nướng) or soaked (ướt). They are typically served rolled (cuộn) or baked (nướng), in salads, soups and stirred fried Vietnamese dishes.

The light, translucent traditional banh trang wrappers are typically used for various Vietnamese rolls, more commonly the goi cuon (salad rolls). Though commonly used in fresh rolls, Vietnamese cuisine often use these wrappers in chả giò (Northern Vietnamese: Nem rán), a crispy, fried springroll. Traditional banh trang wrappers are also used to wrap common Vietnamese dishes such as banh xeo (Vietnamese sizzling pancakes), bò 7 món (Vietnamese seven courses of beef) and cá nướng (Vietnamese grilled fish) and then dipped into a sauce.

The traditional banh trang wrappers are also used to make a Vietnamese salad dish called bánh tráng trộn (stirred banh trang salad).

Woven banh trang wrappers are typically deep-fried to make aesthetically appealing cha gio (Vietnamese crispy spring rolls).

Sesame banh trang wrappers are typically baked or soaked in water, depending on individual textural preference, then served with salads, mi Quang and various other dishes.

== Outside Vietnam ==
Banh tráng is a delicacy among the Vietnamese diaspora, who reside in countries outside Vietnam.
