= Gỏi cuốn =

Vietnamese dish

Gỏi cuốn / cold roll
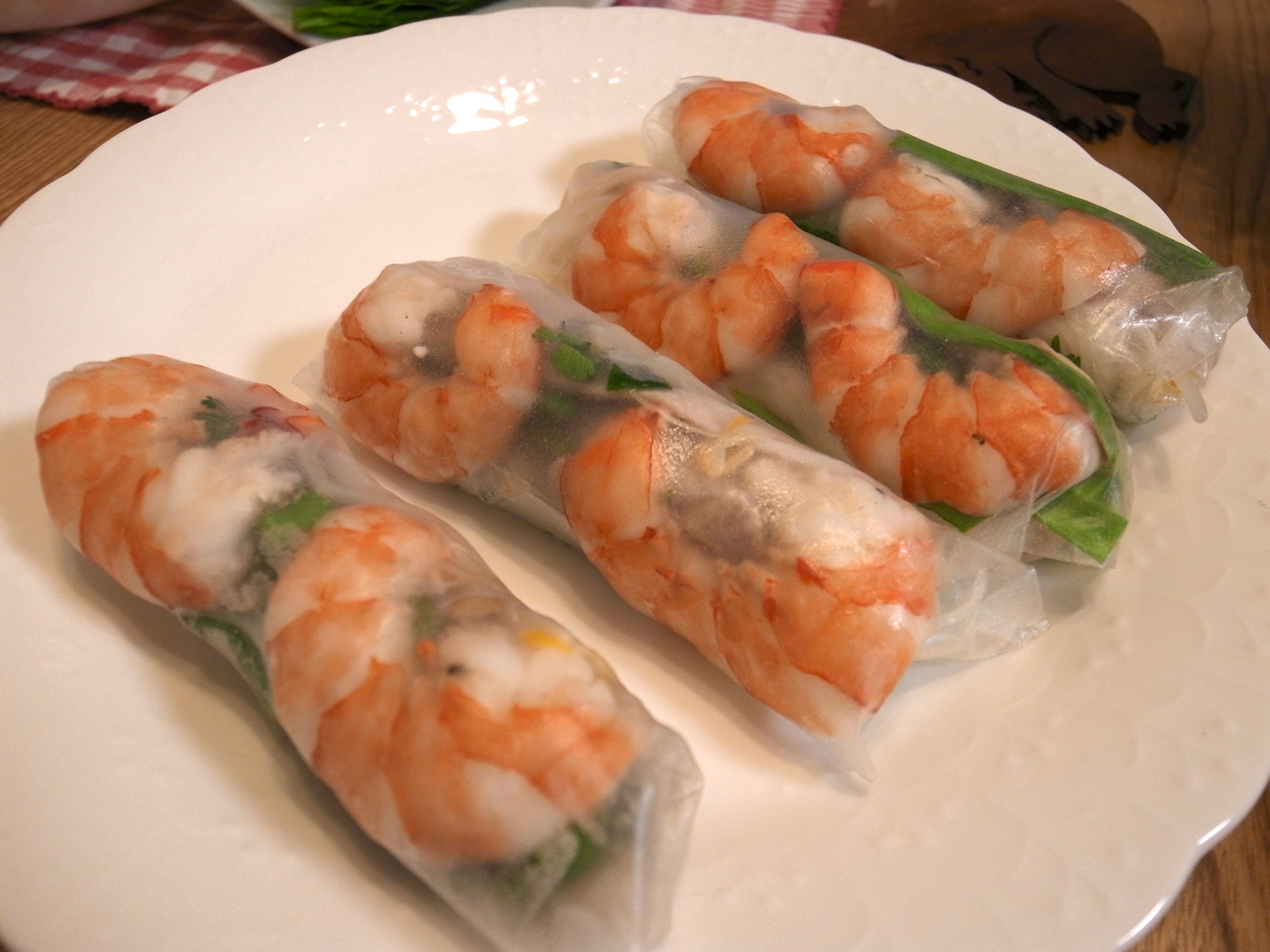
- Vietnamese spring rolls (gỏi cuốn)
- Alternative names: Nem cuốn; fresh spring roll; summer roll; salad roll; cold roll; rice paper roll
- Course: Hors d'oeuvre
- Place of origin: Vietnam
- Region or state: Regions of Vietnam
- Serving temperature: Room temperature
- Main ingredients: Pork; prawns; vegetables; bún; bánh tráng

Gỏi cuốn, (Vietnamese pronunciation: [ɣɔj˧˩ kuən˧˦]) nem cuốn, salad roll, summer roll, fresh spring roll, or rice paper roll is a Vietnamese dish traditionally consisting of pork, prawn, vegetables, bún (rice vermicelli), and other ingredients wrapped in bánh tráng (commonly known as rice paper or cold roll).

Gỏi cuốn are served fresh, unlike similar rolls that are fried, like the Vietnamese chả giò. They are served at room temperature (or cooled) and are not cooked on the outside.

== Preparation ==
Video demonstration of summer roll preparation

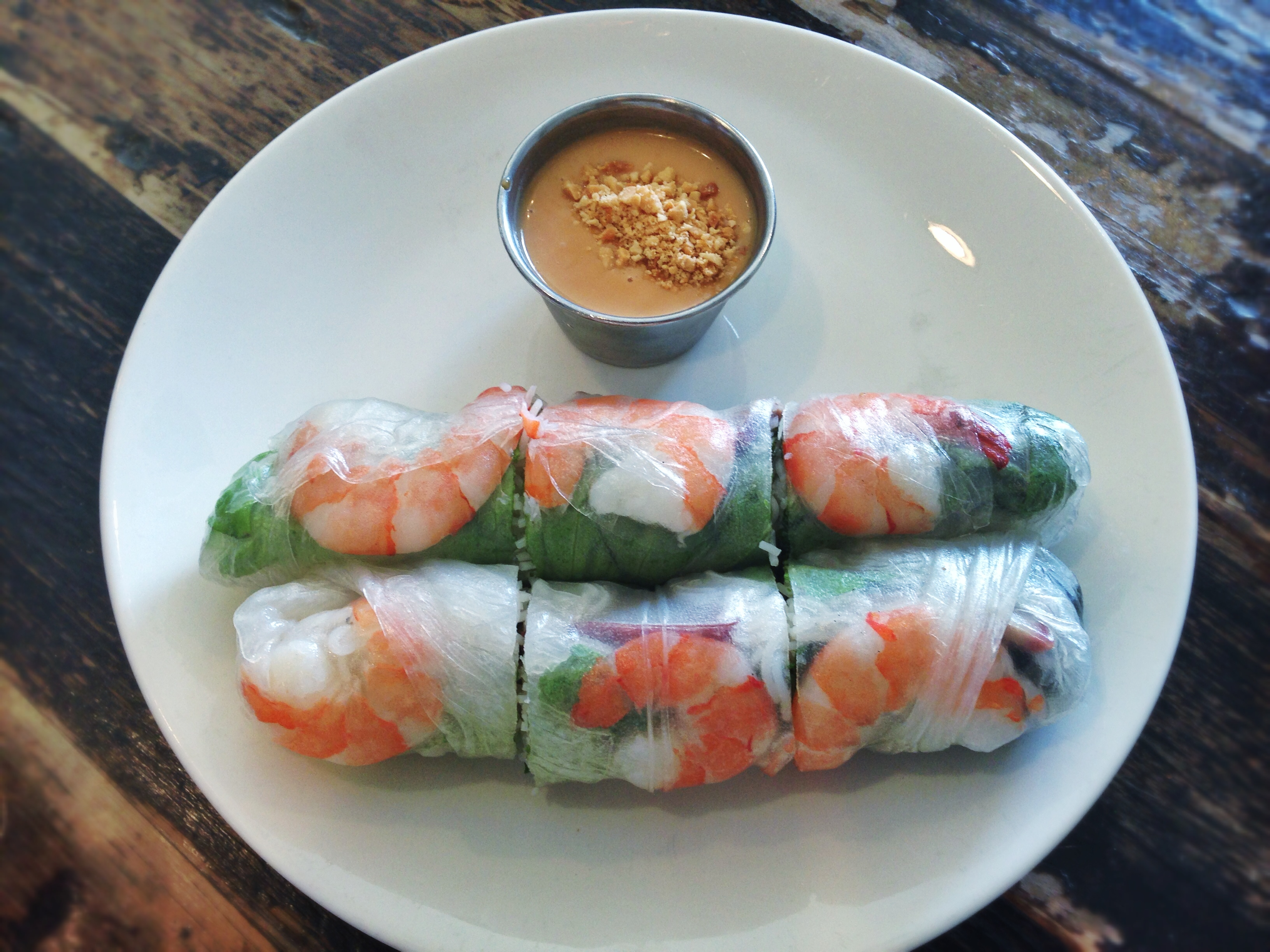
Gỏi cuốn with peanut sauce

The bánh tráng is dipped in water, then laid flat on a plate with the desired amount of ingredients placed on top. The fresh gỏi cuốn is then rolled up and ready to be eaten. Gỏi cuốn can be served with tương xào (also known as hoisin sauce), which consists of ground tương (tương đen or tương xay) and mixed coconut water (or broth), before being stir-fried with garlic and some sugar and then sprinkled with chili powder and ground peanuts. Alternatively, gỏi cuốn can be served with peanut sauce or other Vietnamese dipping sauces, such as nước chấm, a condiment based on fish sauce.

In Vietnam and in various parts of Southeast Asia, Vietnamese can be seen hand-making bánh tráng and placing them on the rectangular bamboo trays around their houses. Traditionally, gỏi cuốn are eaten with a large group of people at a home setting.

== Regional ==
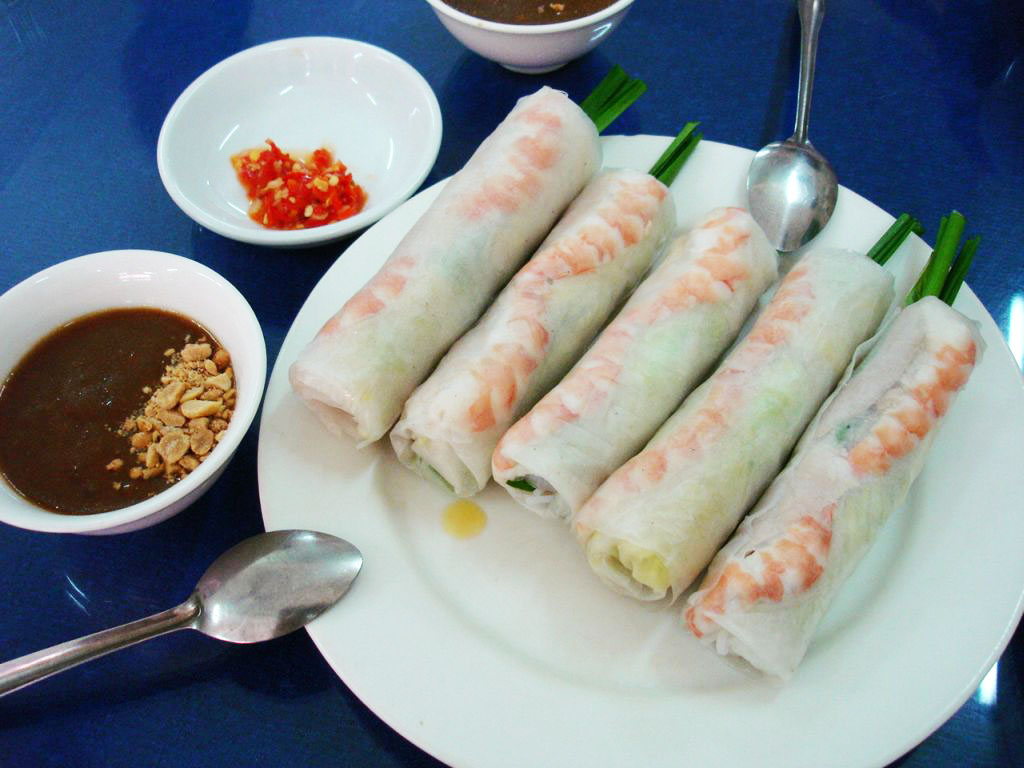
Gỏi cuốn with accompaniments: tương and fresh chili

In southern Vietnam, these rolls are called gỏi cuốn, meaning salad rolls, while in northern Vietnam, these rolls are called nem cuốn, meaning nem rolls. In central Vietnam, they are simply called "rice paper" rolls. In the West, these rolls are called by several different English names, including "salad roll", "spring roll" and "summer roll." Sometimes the word "Vietnamese" is added at the beginning of these words; for example, in Hong Kong, they are called "Vietnamese rolls", and in Australia and the United States they may be called "Vietnamese spring rolls" (although specifically in Australia they may sometimes be referred to as "cold rolls"). Some Asian restaurants in the United States also refer to them as "crystal rolls", "soft rolls" or "salad rolls". The name "summer roll" was popularized by some Vietnamese American restaurants for easier marketing and as a seasonal play on the term "spring roll". But many Vietnamese American restaurants still use "spring roll" as the English translation.

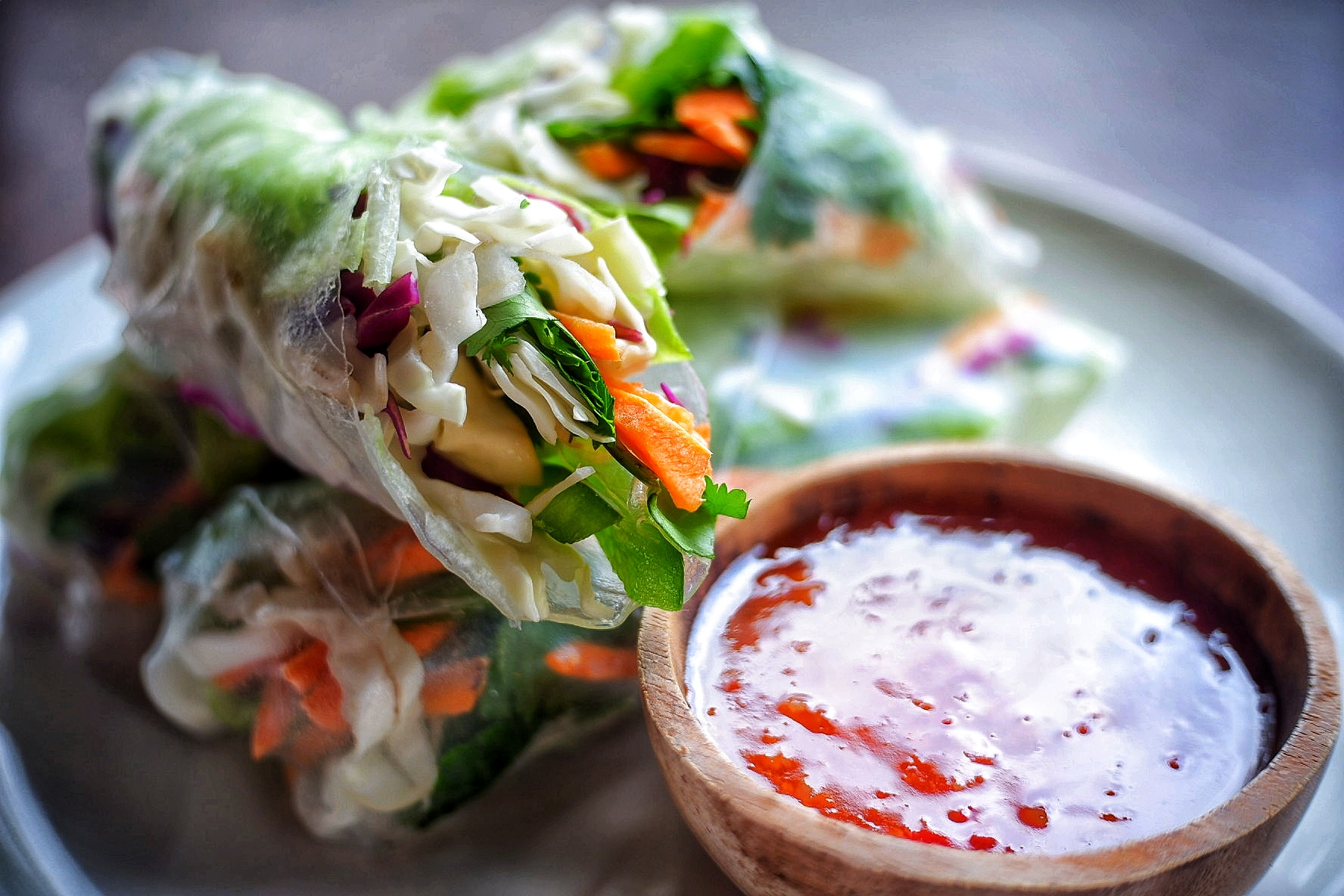
Vegetarian gỏi cuốn filled with vegetables and dipped in tương

Fresh rolls are easily distinguished from similar rolls by the fact that they are not fried, and the ingredients used are different from (deep-fried) Vietnamese egg rolls. In Cambodia, Vietnamese gỏi cuốn are called nime chao, meaning "raw rice paper"; they are produced by a different technique in the Siem Reap and Battambang areas from that in Vietnam. Another dish called kuy tieu kat ("cut rice noodles") is created by steaming the water mixture and adding meat, vegetables and other assorted condiments. In Japan, they are called nama harumaki (生春巻き) ("raw spring rolls"), and are typically filled with shrimp.

== Variants ==
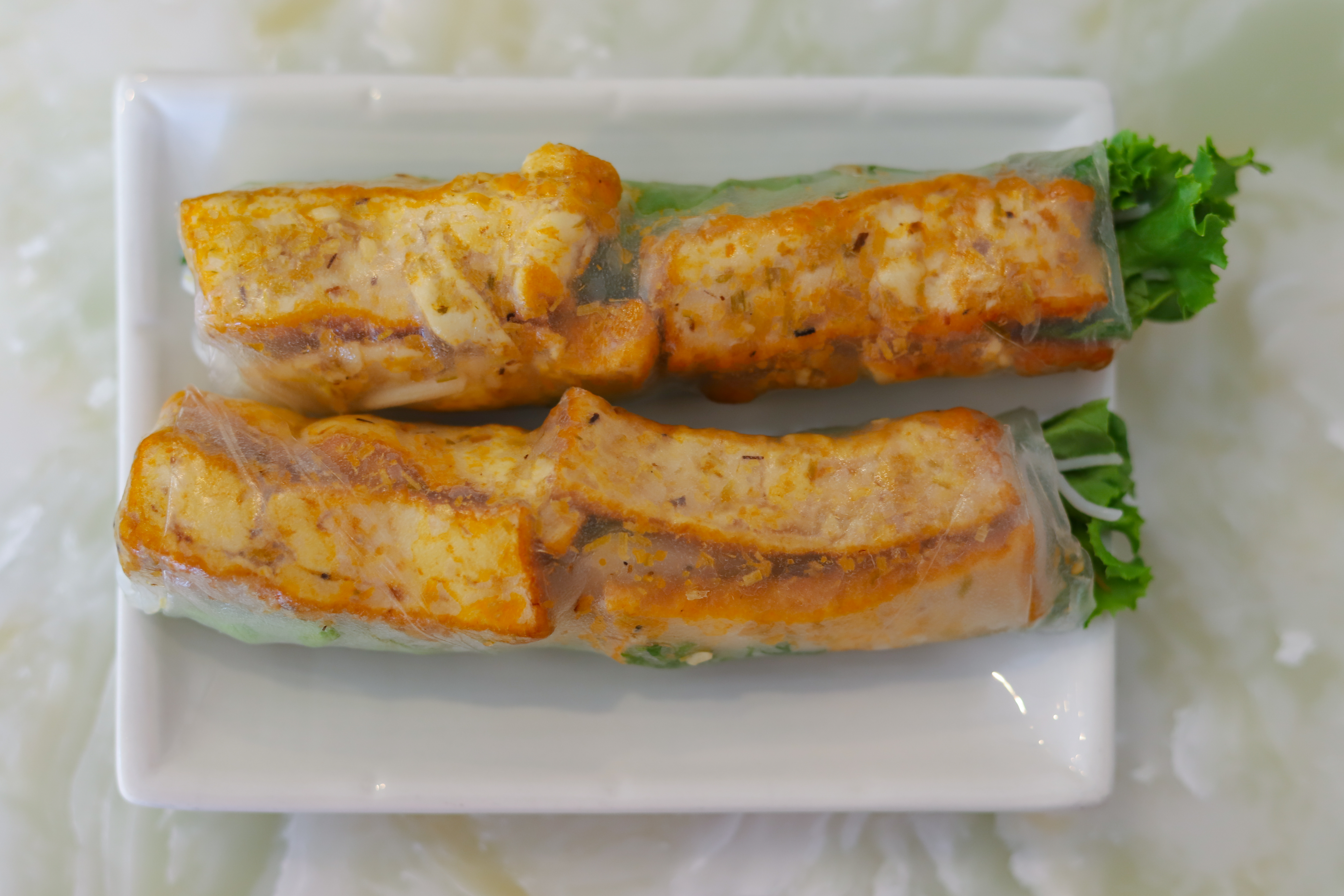
Vegetarian gỏi cuốn with vegetarian chả

The fillings can vary from the standard pork slices, Vietnamese sausage slices (chả), and shrimp; fish, pan-fried seafood (such as squid), beef poached in a lemongrass broth, grilled nem nướng sausages, braised pork, and egg are among some of the other popular spring roll variations. Vegan variations include tofu, mushrooms or avocado.

== See also ==
- Chả
- Nem
- Rice noodles
- Spring roll
