= Bun cha =

Vietnamese dish

Bún chả
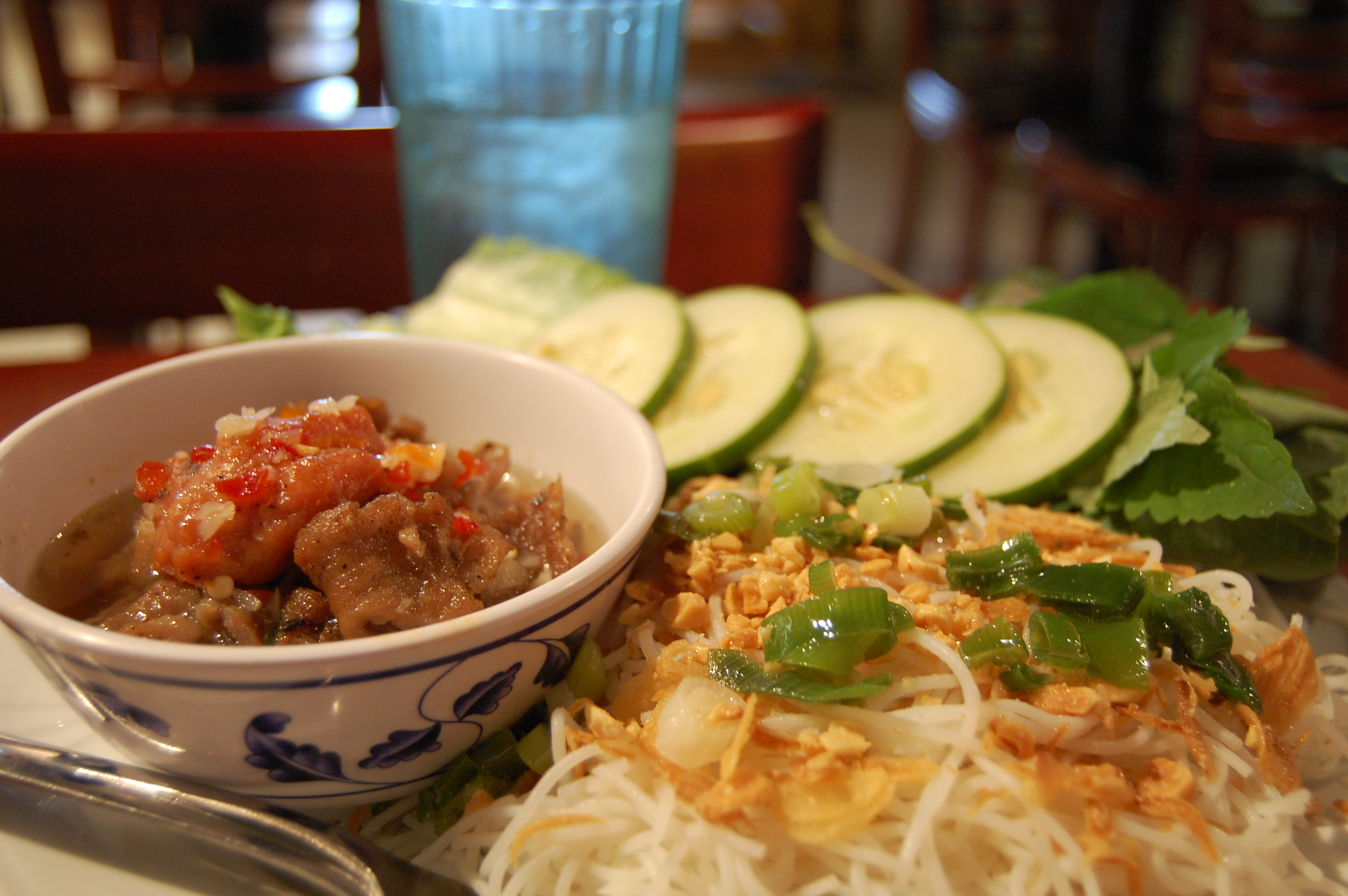
- Bún chả dish served in Hanoi.
- Type: Noodle soup
- Place of origin: Vietnam
- Region or state: Hanoi
- Serving temperature: Hot
- Main ingredients: Rice vermicelli, grilled pork, fresh herbs, nước chấm

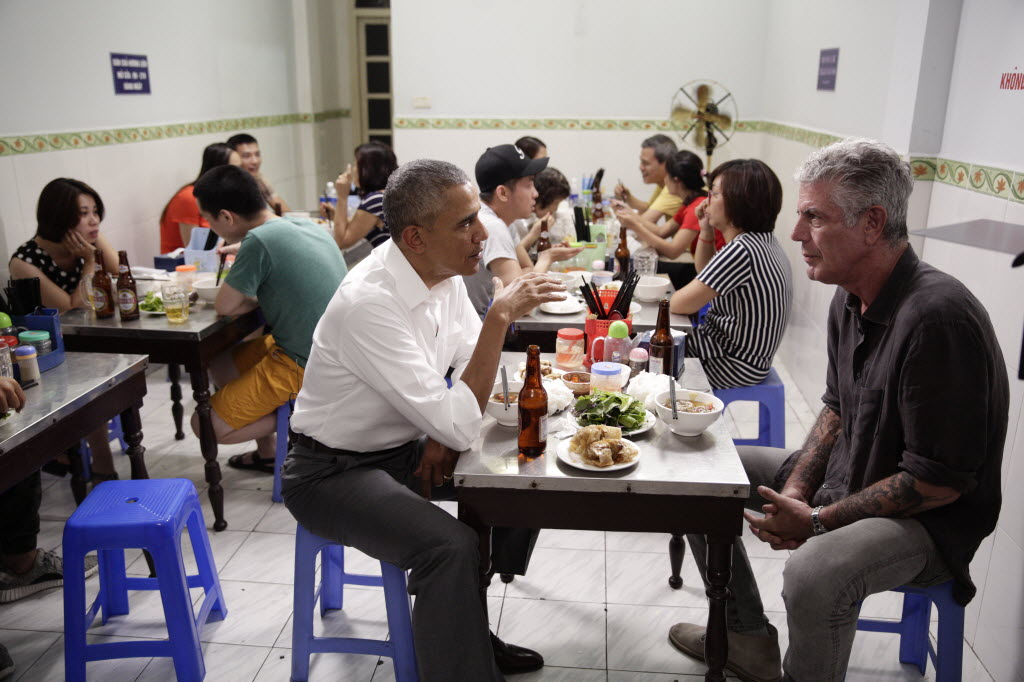
U.S. President Barack Obama (left) and chef Anthony Bourdain (right) dining at Bún chả Hương Liên in Hanoi, Vietnam, May 2016

Bún chả (Vietnamese: [ɓun˨˩ ca˧ˀ˦˥]) is a Vietnamese dish of grilled pork and noodles, which is thought to have originated from Hanoi, Vietnam. Bún chả is served with grilled fatty pork (chả) over a plate of white rice noodles (bún) and herbs with a side dish of dipping sauce. The dish was described in 1959 by Vietnamese food writer Vũ Bằng (1913–1984), who described Hanoi as a town "transfixed by bún chả". Hanoi's first bún chả restaurant was on Gia Ngư, Hoàn Kiếm District, in Hanoi's Old Quarter.

== Description and origins ==
Bún chả remains very popular in Hanoi and throughout Vietnam. Although it is a common misconception among non-Vietnamese diners that bún chả is related to the Southern Vietnam dish of vermicelli and grilled skewered pork called bún thịt nướng, the two dishes are completely distinct in both culinary history and cultural perception.

The origin of the dish is unknown, but one story is that it was created by a grill master in the late 19th or early 20th century in Hanoi. The dish has French influences from the period of French colonialism, such as the techniques used to make the minced pork patties.

=== Bún chả in Hanoi ===
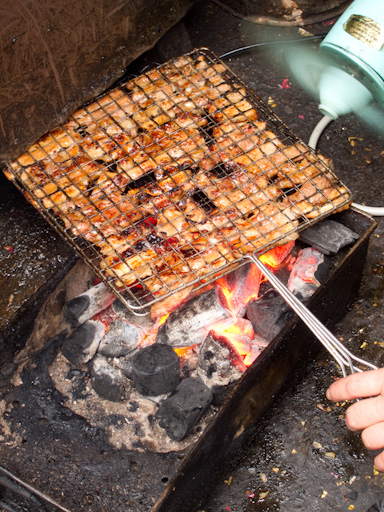
Meat being grilled for bún chả

Bún chả is made up of many ingredients, which include:

1. Meat: minced pork shoulder to make meatballs, pork belly. The meat is skewered or put between grills, then grilled on top of charcoal.
2. Rice vermicelli
3. Dipping sauce: diluted fish sauce with sugar, lime juice, vinegar, stock, crushed garlic, chilli, etc.
4. Pickled vegetables: green papaya (or carrots, onion, kohlrabi)
5. Fresh herbs: lettuce, Láng basil, rice paddy herb (ngổ), bean sprouts, Vietnamese balm (kinh giới)
6. Side dishes: crushed garlic, crushed chilli, vinegar, ground pepper, sliced limes

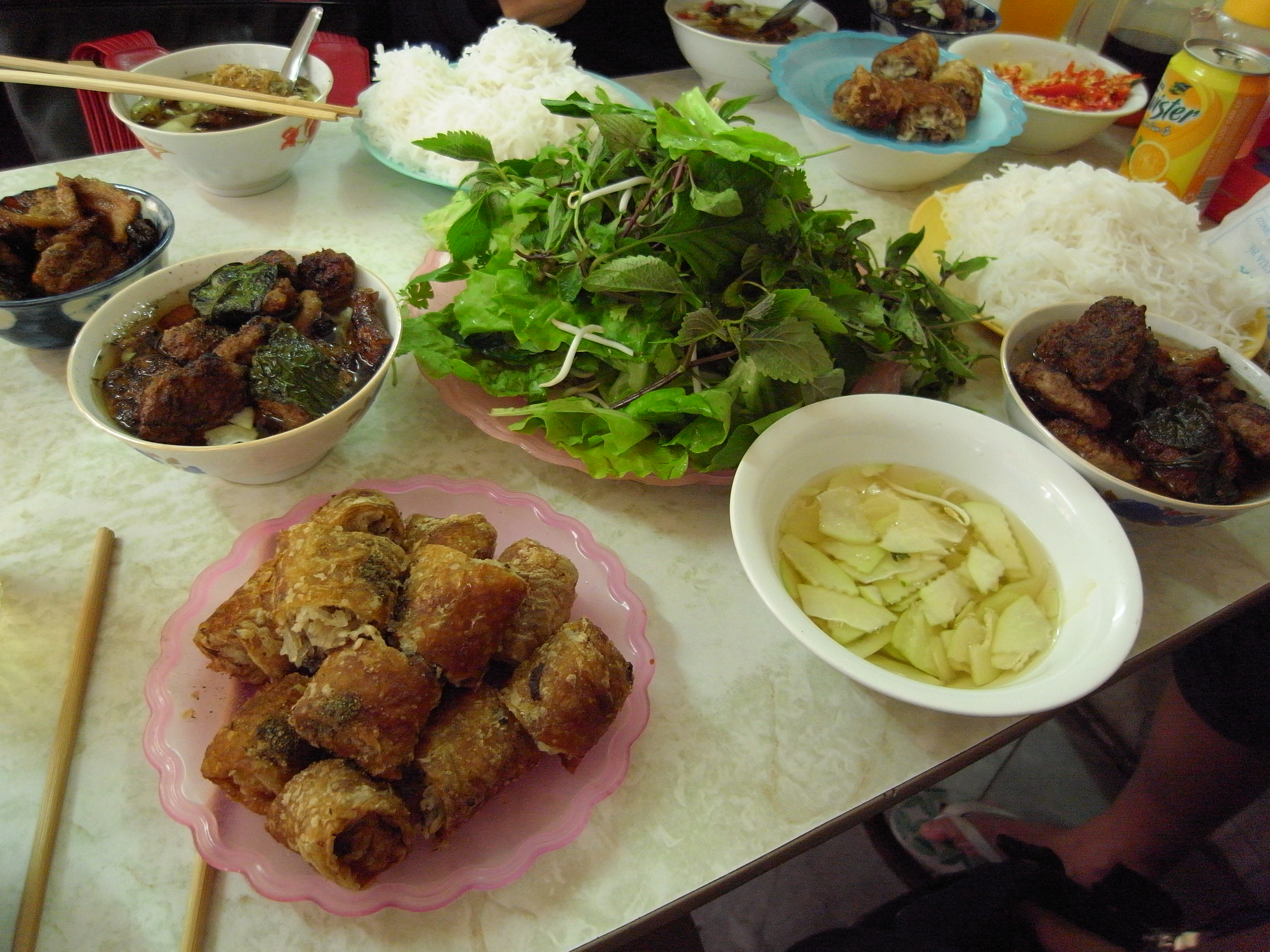
Bún chả and crab spring rolls in Hàng Mành street, Hanoi

Bún chả is traditionally eaten at lunchtime as a unique cultural feature of the capital city. Nowadays, there are shops that sell bún chả all day long.

There are many variations of bún chả in Hanoi, and some shops have created their own styles by changing the preparation method or serving time, such as bún chả wrapped in banana leaves, wrapped in pork fat, skewered on bamboo sticks, or served with bone broth.

== Cultural significance ==
The Hanoi restaurant Bún Chả Hương Liên became famous after United States President Barack Obama dined there with Chef Anthony Bourdain during his trip to Vietnam in May 2016. The restaurant has since gained the nickname Bún Chả Obama, featuring photos of his visit on their walls, as well as offering a "combo Obama", consisting of the bún chả, fried seafood roll and bottle of Hanoi Beer that the president ordered.

== See also ==
- Bún thịt nướng
- Rice noodles
- Vietnamese noodles
