= Bún thịt nướng =

Vietnamese cold rice vermicelli dish

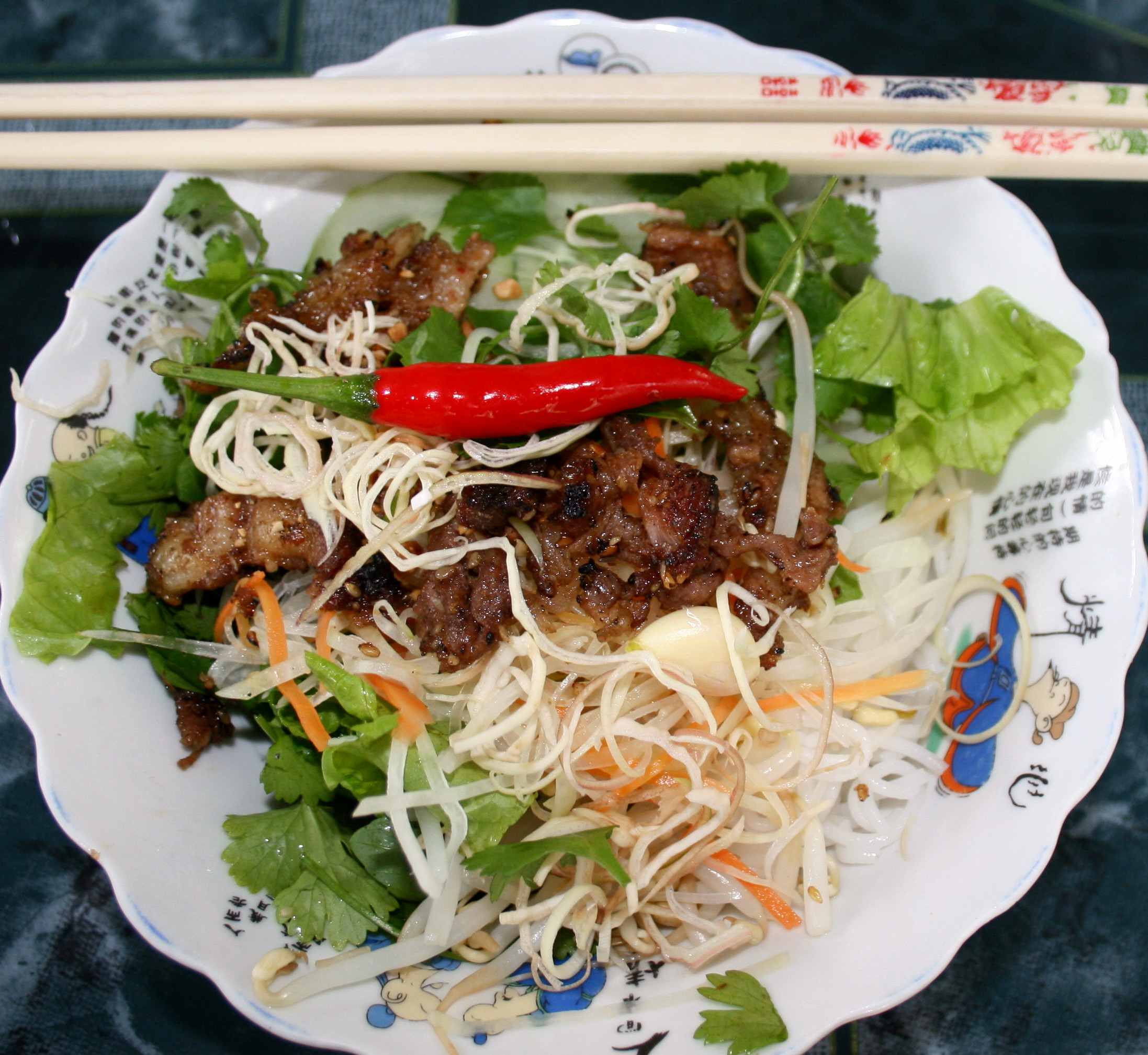
- A plate of bún thịt nướng
- Type: Cold noodles
- Place of origin: Vietnam
- Region or state: Southeast Asia
- Main ingredients: Rice vermicelli, grilled pork, fresh herbs, salad, and nước chấm

Bún thịt nướng (Vietnamese: [ɓǔn tʰìt nɨ̌əŋ], 'rice noodles [with] grilled meat'), which originated from Southern Vietnam, is a popular Vietnamese dish of cold rice noodle topped with grilled pork, fresh herbs like basil and mint, fresh salad, giá (bean sprouts), and chả giò (spring rolls). The dish is dressed in nước mam fish sauce (nước chấm). The dish is topped with roasted peanuts, Vietnamese pickled carrots, nem nướng̣ (grilled garlic pork sausage) or grilled prawns. Bún thịt nướng is popular in all regions of Vietnam, alongside Hanoi's bún chả.

== Varieties ==
- Bún nước lèo (vegetarian, using tofu in place of meat)
- Bún thịt nướng bò (rice noodles with grilled beef)
- Bún thịt nướng tôm (with grilled prawns)
- Bún thịt nướng chả giò (with egg rolls)
- Bún thịt nướng Đà Nẵng (Da Nang style)

== See also ==
- Bún chả
- Rice noodles
- Vietnamese noodles
