= Rice vermicelli =

Thin dried noodles made of rice

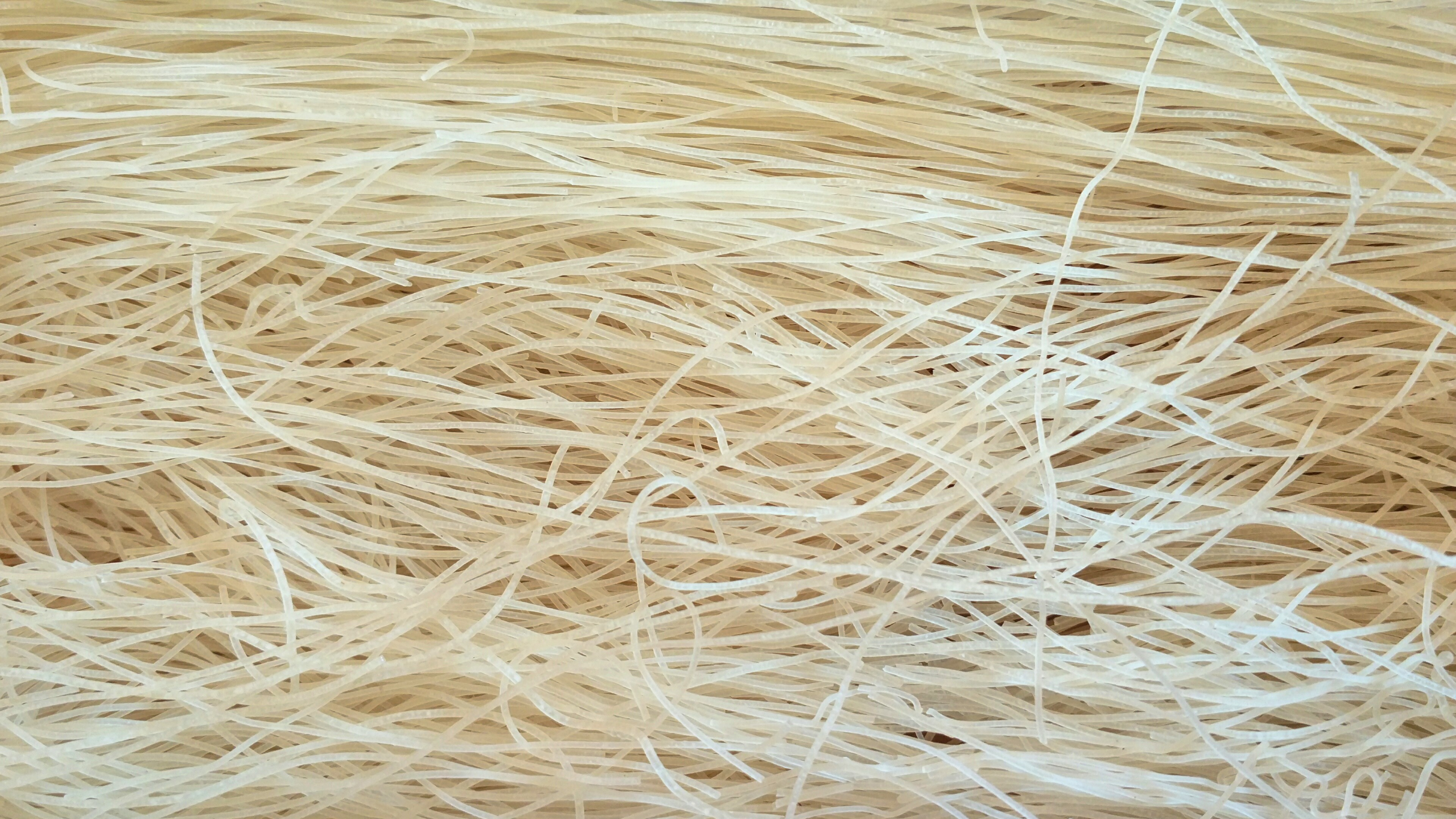
- Strands of rice vermicelli
- Alternative names: Rice noodles, rice sticks
- Type: Rice noodles
- Place of origin: Southern China
- Region or state: East Asia, Indian subcontinent, and Southeast Asia
- Main ingredients: Rice
- Variations: Guìlín mǐfěn

Rice vermicelli

Chinese name
- Chinese: 米粉
Transcriptions
Standard Mandarin
- Hanyu Pinyin: mífěn
Hakka
- Romanization: mi fun
Yue: Cantonese
- Jyutping: mai5 fan2
Southern Min
- Hokkien POJ: bí-hún
- Tâi-lô: bí-hún
Eastern Min
- Fuzhou BUC: mī-hūng
Pu-Xian Min
- Hinghwa BUC: bî-heông

Burmese name
- Burmese: ဆန်ကြာဆံ (san kyar zan)

Vietnamese name
- Vietnamese alphabet: bún
- Chữ Nôm: 𥻸

Thai name
- Thai: เส้นหมี่
- RTGS: sen mee

Japanese name
- Kana: ビーフン
Transcriptions
- Romanization: bīfun

Malay name
- Malay: bihun

Indonesian name
- Indonesian: bihun

Filipino name
- Tagalog: bihon

Tamil name
- Tamil: சேவை (sevai)

Lao name
- Lao: ເຂົ້າປຸ້ນ (Khao poon)

Khmer name
- Khmer: មីសួរ (Mii Sur)

Rice vermicelli is a thin form of rice noodle. It is sometimes referred to as "rice noodles" or "rice sticks", but should not be confused with cellophane noodles, a different Asian type of vermicelli made from mung bean starch or rice starch rather than rice grains themselves.

== Presentation and varieties ==
Rice vermicelli is a part of several Asian cuisines, where it is often eaten as part of a soup dish, stir-fry, or salad. Being in such widespread use, multiple varieties exist. One particularly well-known, slightly thicker variety, called Guìlín mǐfěn (桂林米粉), comes from the southern Chinese city of Guilin, where it is a breakfast staple.

== Names ==
Rice vermicelli is widely known in Asia by cognates of Hokkien 米粉 (bí-hún, lit. 'rice vermicelli'). These include bīfun (Japan), bí-hún or mifen (Taiwan), bíjon or bihon (Philippines), bee hoon (Singapore), bihun or mee hoon (Malaysia and Indonesia), and mee hoon (Southern Thailand). Other names include num banh chok (Cambodia), hsan-kya-zan (Myanmar), and bún (Vietnam).

=== Naming in Taiwan ===
Beginning July 1, 2014, Food and Drug Administration of Taiwan rules have been in effect that only products made of 100% rice can be labeled and sold as "米粉"(bí-hún, mǐfěn) in Taiwan, usually translated as "rice vermicelli" or "rice noodle". If the product contains starch or other kinds of grain powder as ingredients but is made of at least 50% rice, it is to be labelled as "調和米粉", meaning "blended rice vermicelli". Products made of less than 50% rice cannot be labelled as rice vermicelli.

== Notable dishes ==
=== East Asia ===
==== Mainland China ====
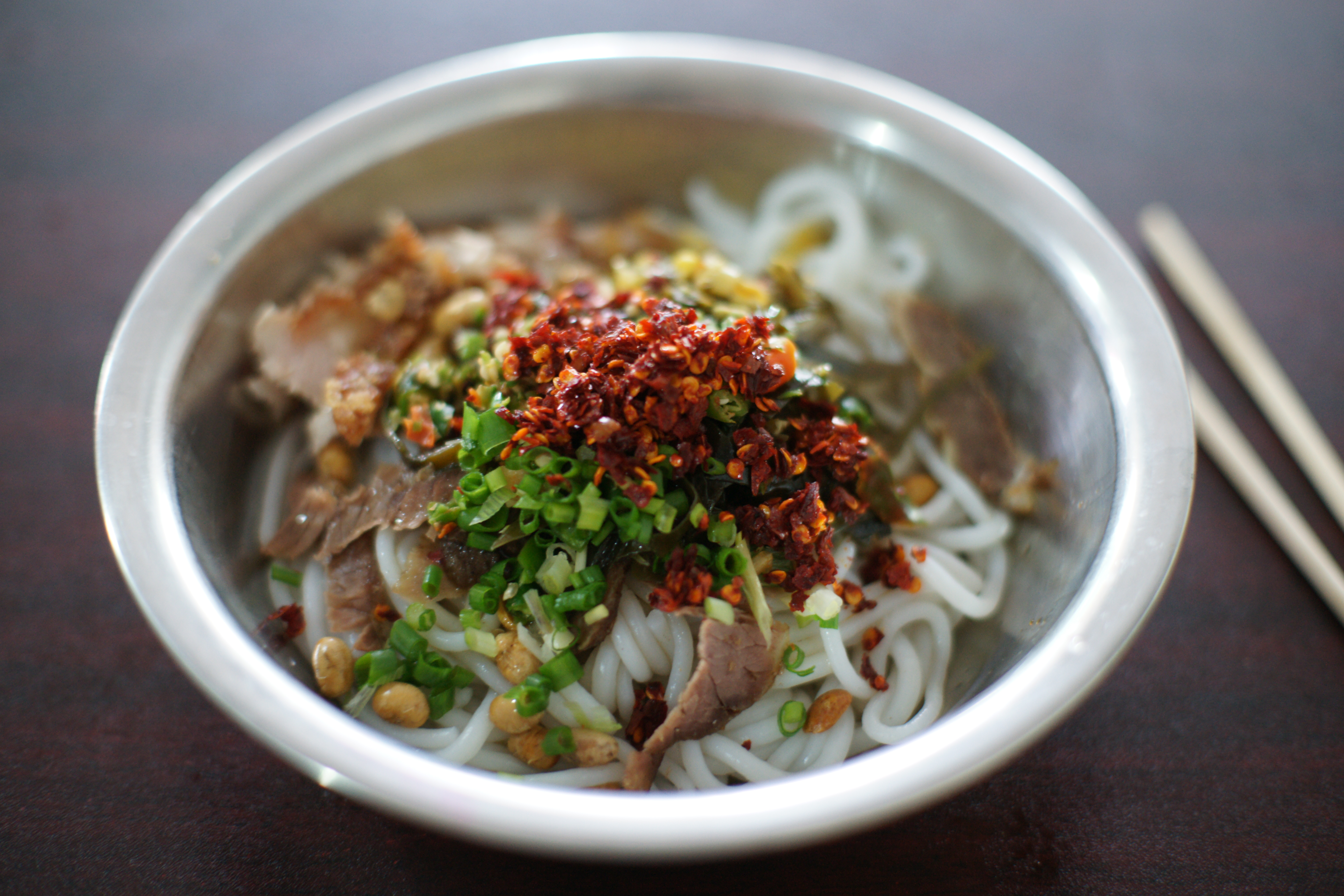
Guilin rice noodles

- Yunnan and Guangxi cuisine—famous dishes include crossing-the-bridge noodles, mixian, Guilin noodles, and luosifen (snail noodles). Rice noodles are also a staple of ethnic Tai, Miao, and Zhuang cuisine.
- Cantonese noodles—a large number of Cantonese dishes use this ingredient (called 米粉 maifun or "rice" in Cantonese). Usually, the noodles are simmered in broth with other ingredients, such as fish balls, beef balls, or fish slices.
- Fujian and Teochew cuisine—rice vermicelli is a commonly used noodle and is served either in soup, stir-fried and dressed with a sauce, or "dry" (without soup) with added ingredients and condiments.

As the term 米粉 (mifen) literally only means "rice noodles" in Chinese, there is considerable variation among rice noodles granted this name. In Hubei and historically in much of Hunan, mifen refers to thick, flat rice noodles made using a wet mix, similar to shahe fen. In Changde, the term refers to thick, round noodles that have supplanted the other mifen in Hunan. These are mifen in China, but not rice vermicelli noodles.

==== Hong Kong ====
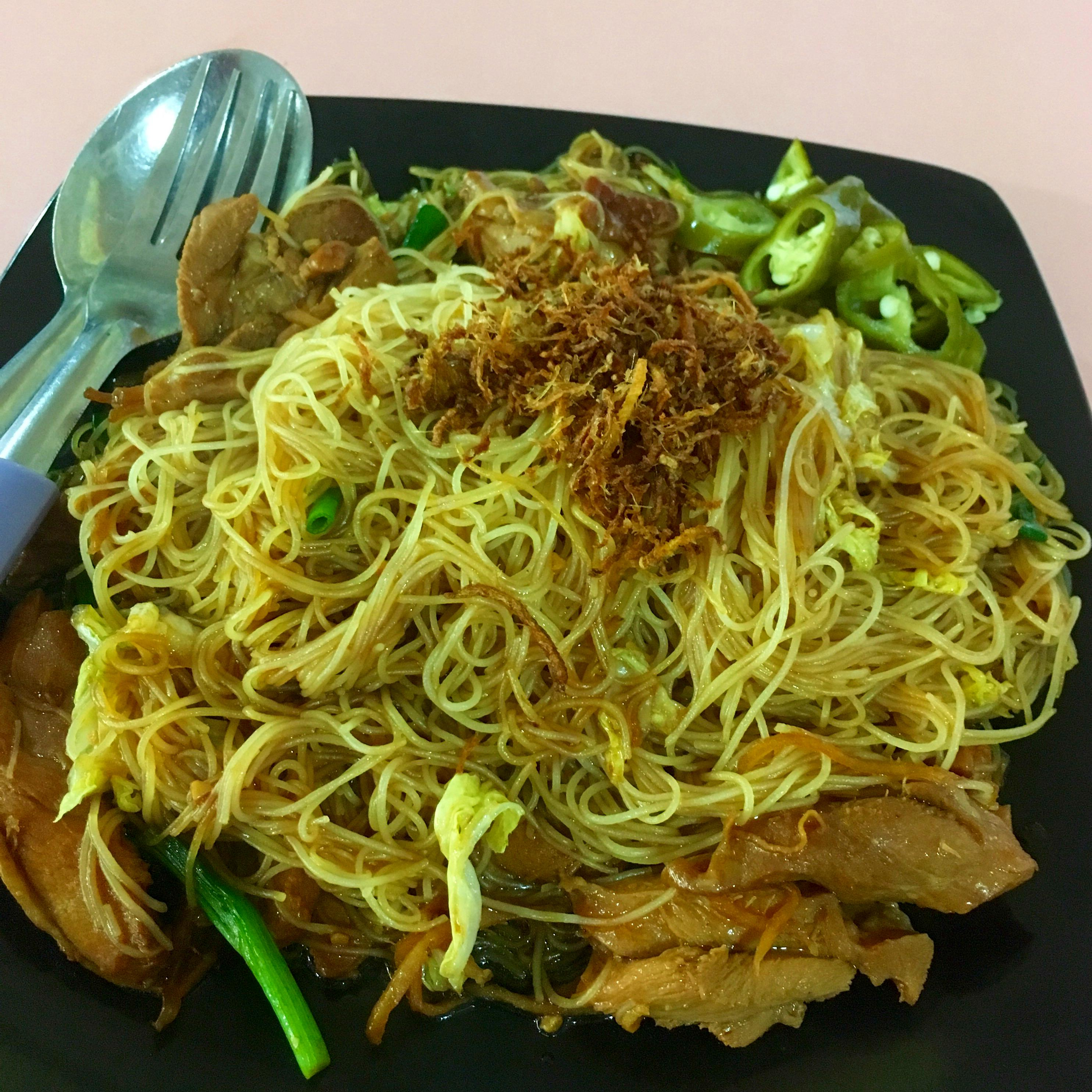
Singapore fried rice noodles

- Singapore-style noodles (星州炒米, Xīng zhōu cháo mǐ)—a dish of fried rice vermicelli common in Hong Kong Cantonese-style eateries, inspired by the spicy cuisines of Southeast Asia. This dish is made from rice vermicelli, char siu, egg, shrimp and curry.

==== Taiwan ====
- Taiwanese fried rice vermicelli is the dry, stir-fried local style (particularly known in the Hsinchu region). Its main ingredients include sliced pork, dried shrimp, and carrots.
- A Hsinchu specialty from Taiwan is to serve rice vermicelli 'dry' (乾 gan, not in a soup) with mushroom and ground pork.

=== South Asia ===
==== Indian Subcontinent ====
- Sevai is a south Indian dish prepared in houses during festive occasions. It is made in different flavours such as lemon, tamarind and coconut milk.
- शेवया (in Marathi) or shevaya are served to the groom and bride a day before their wedding called halad (हळद) in some parts of Maharashtra.
- Paayasam is a South Indian sweet dish made from vermicelli, sago, sugar, spices and nuts and milk.
- Idiyappam is a staple South Indian breakfast dish. It is typical of Tamil Nadu, Kerala and other southern Indian states, as well as Sri Lanka, where it is known as string hopper.

=== Southeast Asia ===
==== Cambodia ====
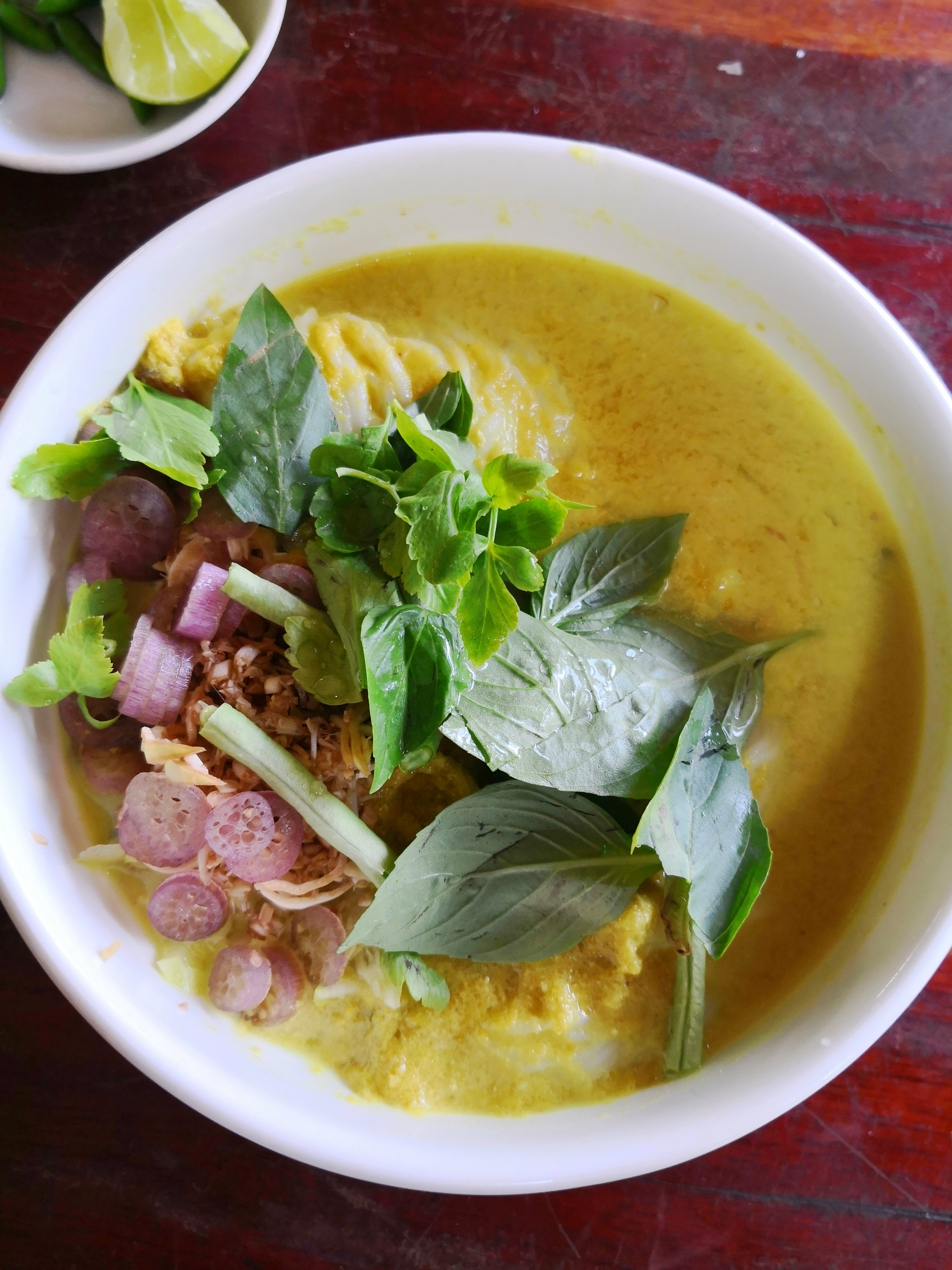
Num banh chok

- Cha mee sor is a stir-fry glass noodle dish common in Cambodia. This dish is commonly made during Pchum Ben. It is taken to the temple and given to the ancestors along with other Cambodian dishes. This dish is sold on the streets of Cambodia and can be eaten any time during the year, mostly enjoyed at parties. Cha mee sor is made with vermicelli noodles and ground pork and sautéed with different Asian sauces. Green onions can be used as garnish at the end.
- Neorm is a Cambodian cold noodle salad, cabbage and vermicelli noodles being the main ingredients, usually served cold with chicken, pork, or shrimp. A variety of vegetables and mints are added and it is mixed with a homemade sweetened fish sauce, topped with crushed peanuts. This dish can be served and eaten any time of the year. It can also be made vegetarian.
- Num banhchok is one of the most popular Khmer dishes, normally served in family gatherings or parties. The typical num banhchok is served with samlor proher, a greenish soup made of fish and kroeung. Fresh vegetables such as chopped cucumbers or bean sprouts can be added as preferred. Num banhchok stalls are usually found in the fresh market and street vendors.

==== Indonesia ====
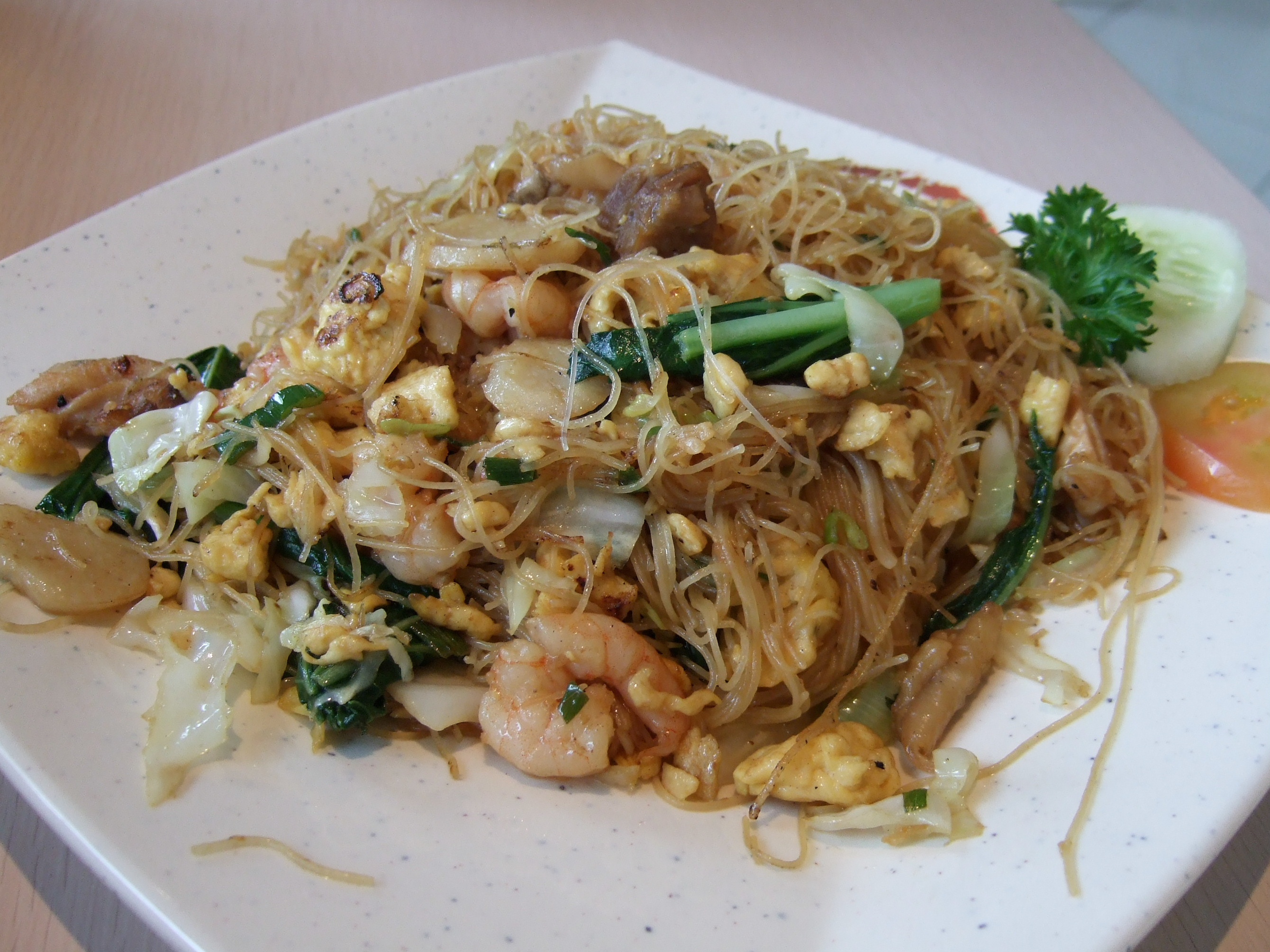
Bihun goreng

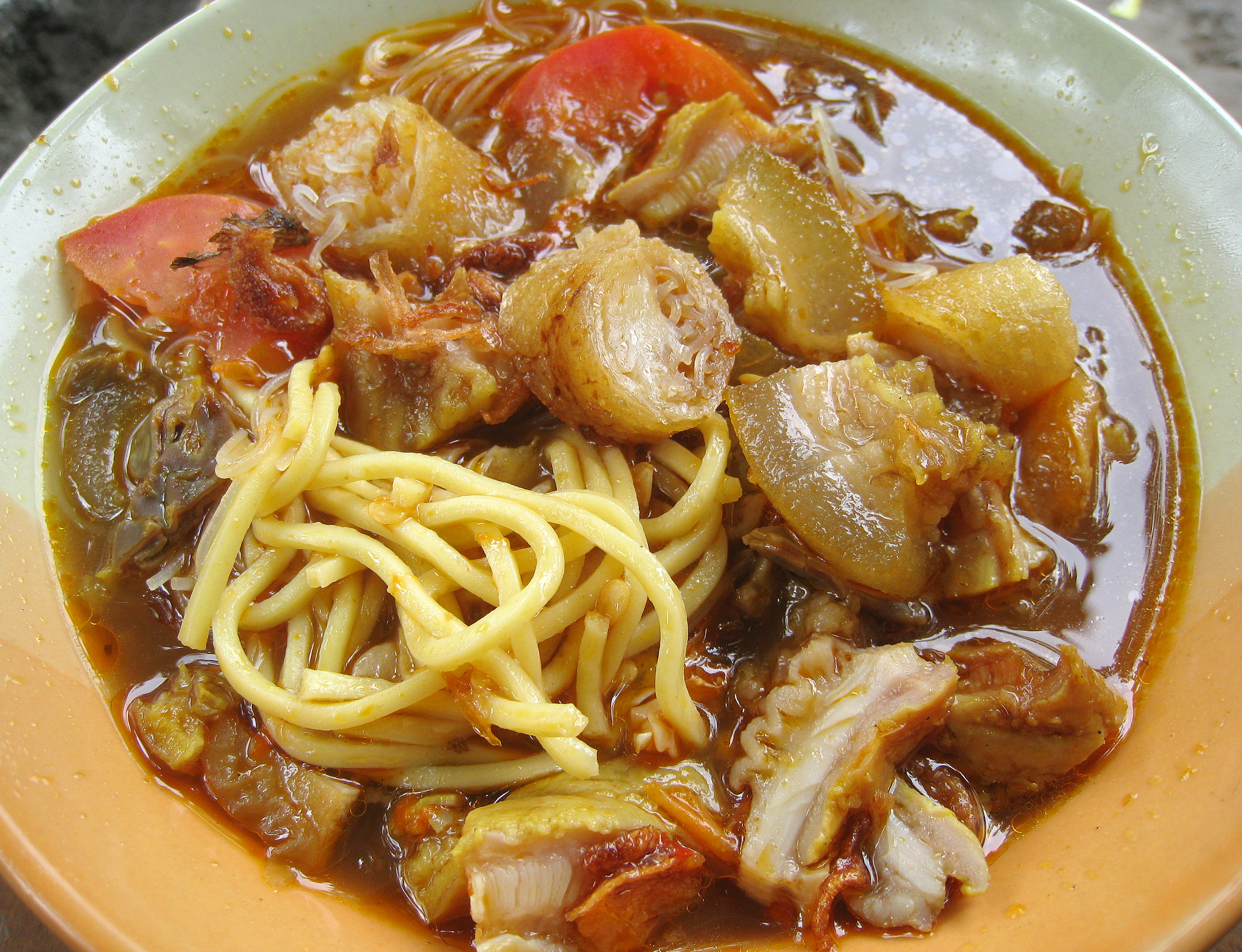
Soto mie bogor-style noodle and rice vermicelli, cabbage, tomato, cartilage and tendons of cow's trotters, and tripe, risoles spring rolls, served in broth soup with added sweet soy sauce, sprinkled with fried shallots and sambal chilli

- Bihun bebek, rice vermicelli topped with duck meat. Specialty of Medan, North Sumatra.
- Bihun goreng, in Chinese Indonesian cuisine, is stir-fried rice vermicelli with sweet soy sauce
- Bihun kari, rice vermicelli mixed with curry
- Bihun rebus or bihun kuah, also Chinese Indonesian cuisine rice vermicelli soup
- Lumpia and risoles, several types of spring rolls (gorengan, fritters) with rice vermicelli and vegetable filling
- Bihun bakso, meatballs served with rice vermicelli soup
- Soto (traditional Indonesian soup), various types of which often include rice vermicelli, as in soto ayam
- Sup oyong (Chinese okra), vegetable soup with rice vermicelli
- Tekwan, a surimi-type fish ball soup related to pempek from South Sumatra, also including rice vermicelli, mushroom, jicama and sedap malam flower

==== Malaysia ====
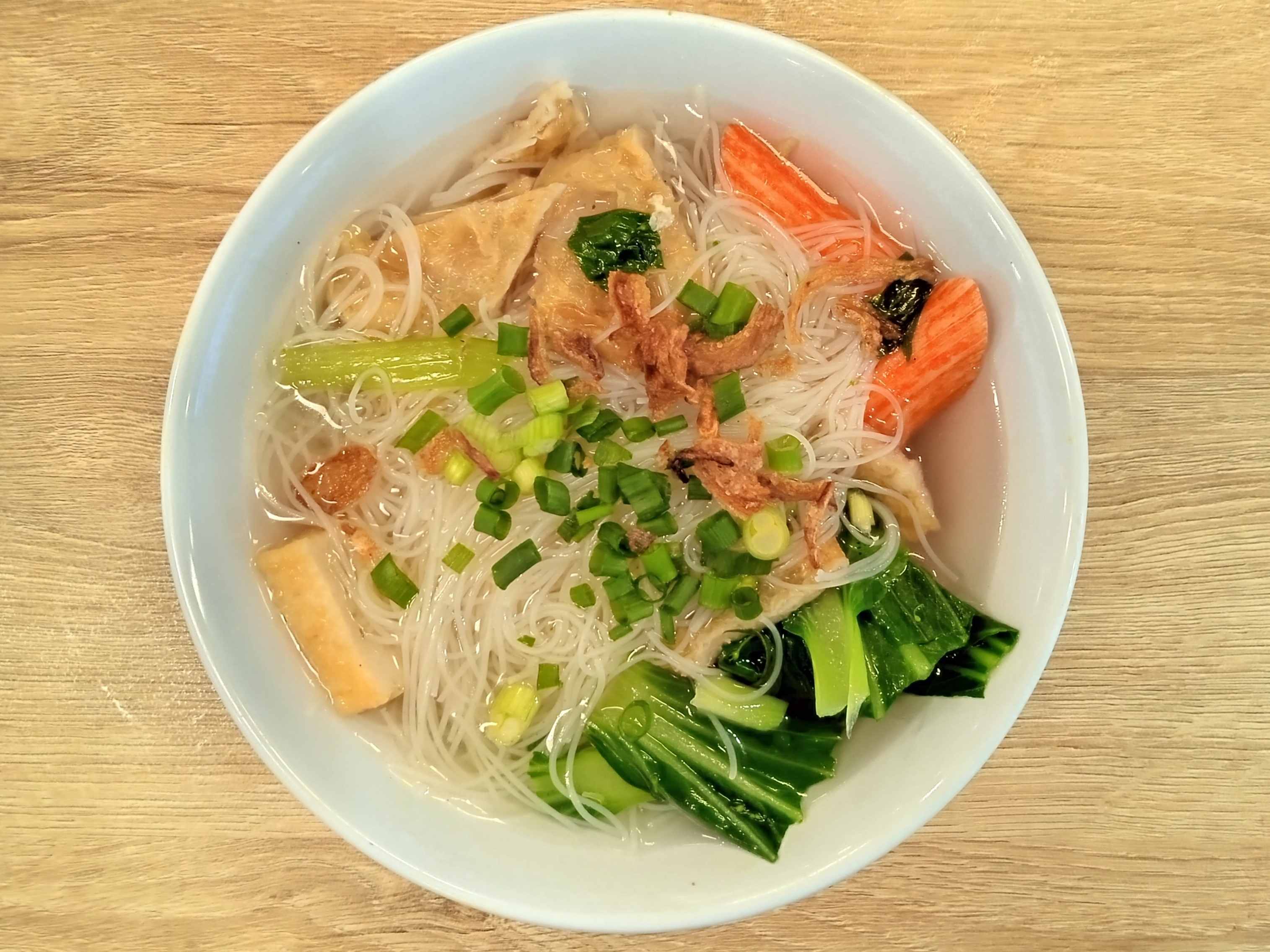
Bihun sup

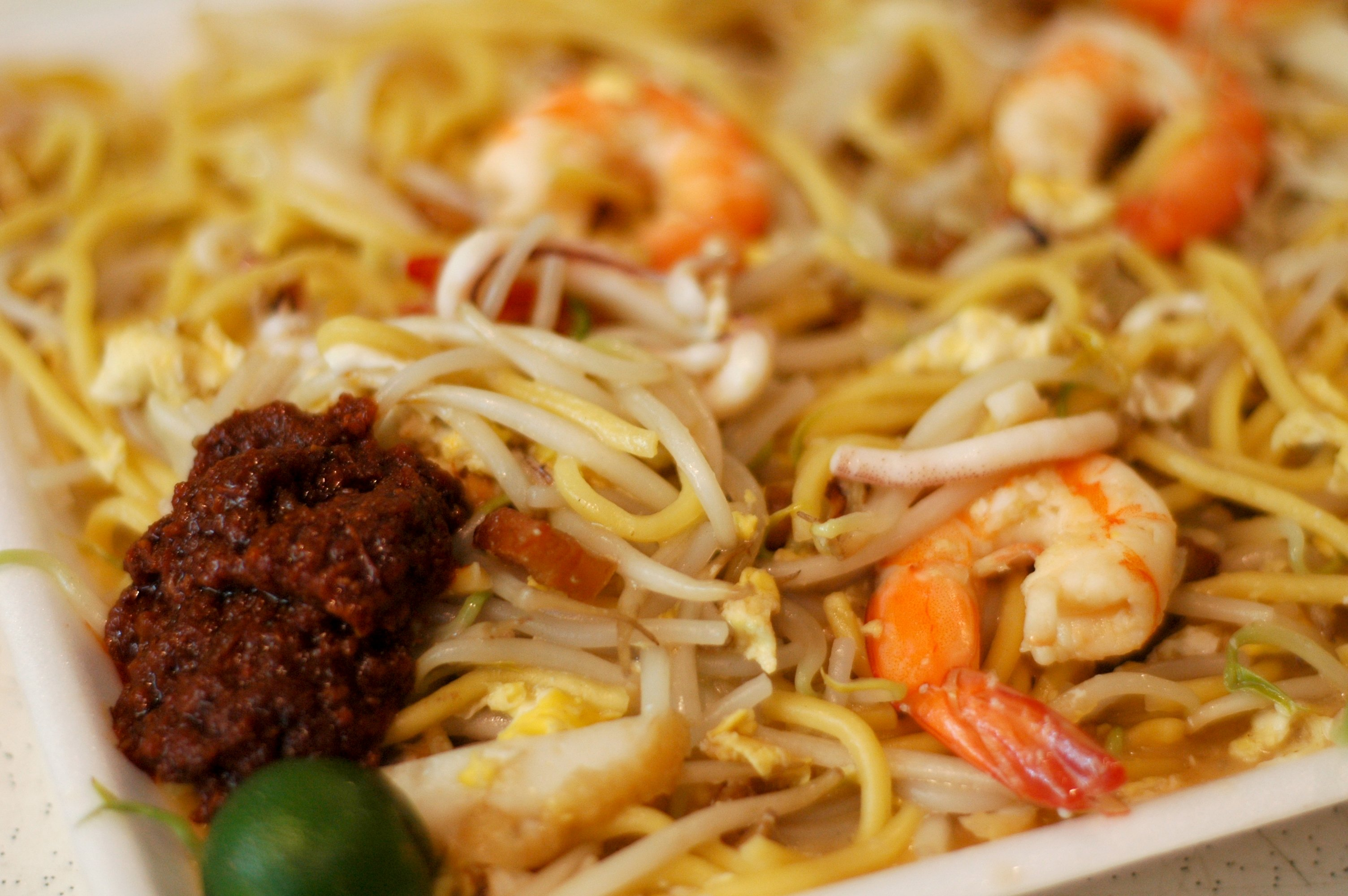
Singaporean-style Hokkien mee

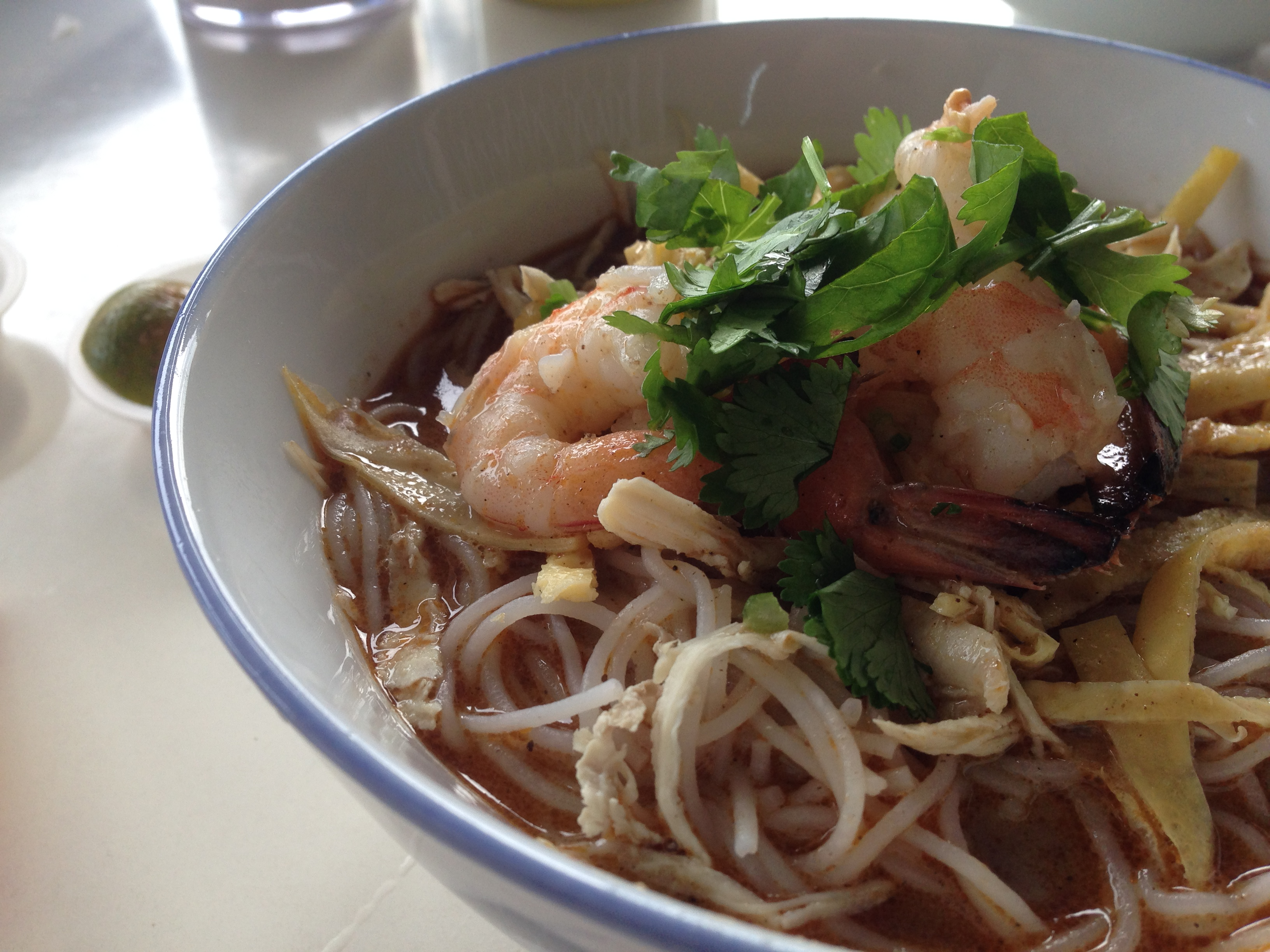
Laksa Sarawak is the de facto state dish of Sarawak

In Malaysia, rice vermicelli may be found as mihun, mi hoon, mee hoon, bihun, or bee hoon.

There are many types of bihun soup.

- Ak thui bihun reng is a duck noodle herbal soup.
- Bihun kari mixed with curry, with mung bean sprout, fried tofu and red chillies sambal added
- Bihun soto is in a yellow spicy chicken broth, served with chicken and a potato cutlet.
- Bihun sup is a Malay-style dish, mixed with spiced beef broth or chicken broth; sometimes it comes with sambal kicap (pounded bird's eye chilli mixed with dark soy sauce) as a condiment.
- Bihun tom yam is mixed with tom yam.
- Char bihun is a Chinese version of fried noodles.
- Hokkien mee throughout Malaysia varies considerably due to regional differences.
- Laksa Sarawak is mixed with a base of sambal belacan, sour tamarind, garlic, galangal, lemon grass and coconut milk, topped with omelette strips, chicken strips, prawns, fresh coriander and optionally lime; ingredients such as bean sprouts, (sliced) fried tofu or seafood are not traditional but are sometimes added.
- Mee siam is a dry stir-fried style dish in Malaysia.
- Sang nyuk mee is a type of pork noodle from Sabah, Malaysia.

==== Myanmar ====
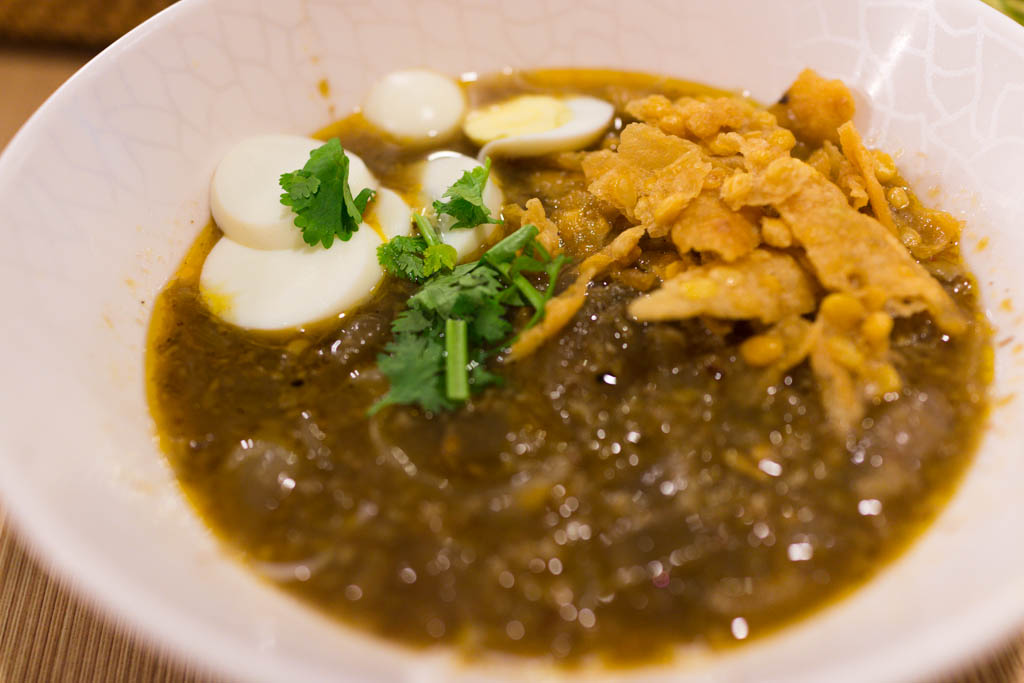
Mohinga with fritters

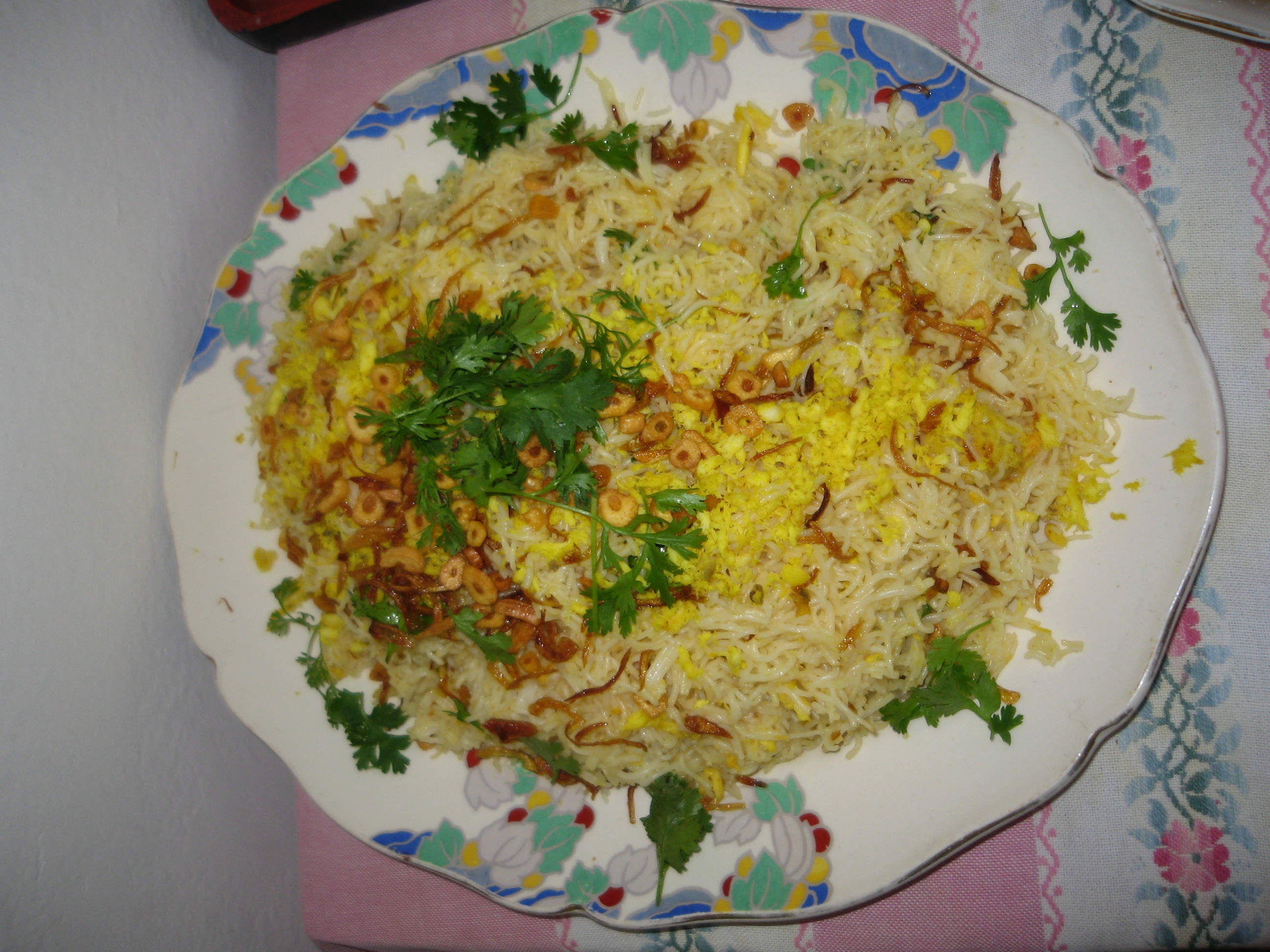
Rakhine mont di fish soup with garnish

- Mohinga—rice vermicelli served with curry gravy and fish, considered by some to be the national dish of Myanmar
- Mont di—fish soup; there are a number of dishes, the Rakhine version from the Arakanese in western Myanmar is the most popular
- Kyar san kyaw—rice vermicelli fried with vegetables; chicken, pork, and seafood are possible additions

==== Philippines ====
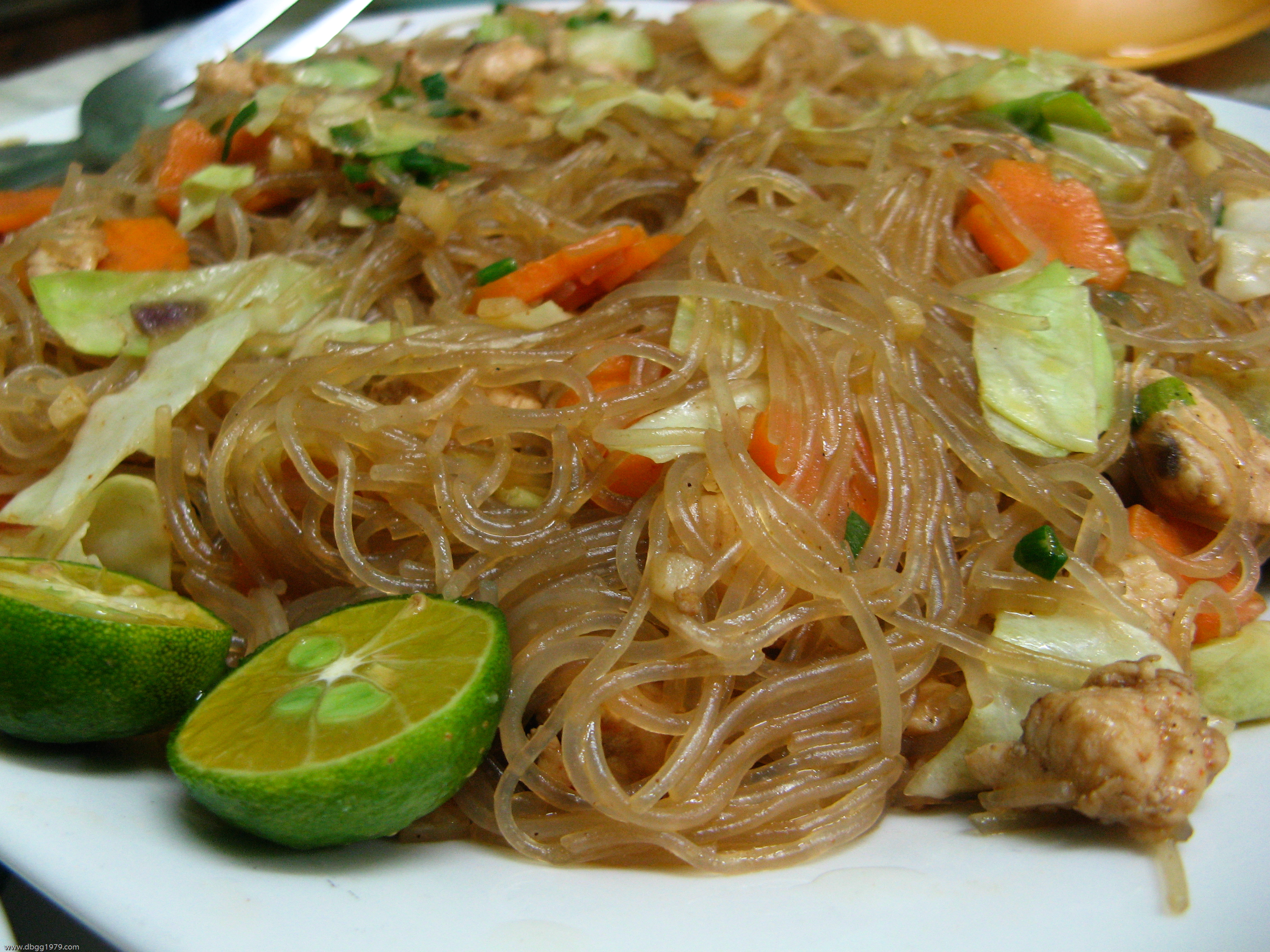
Filipino pancit bihon served with calamansi

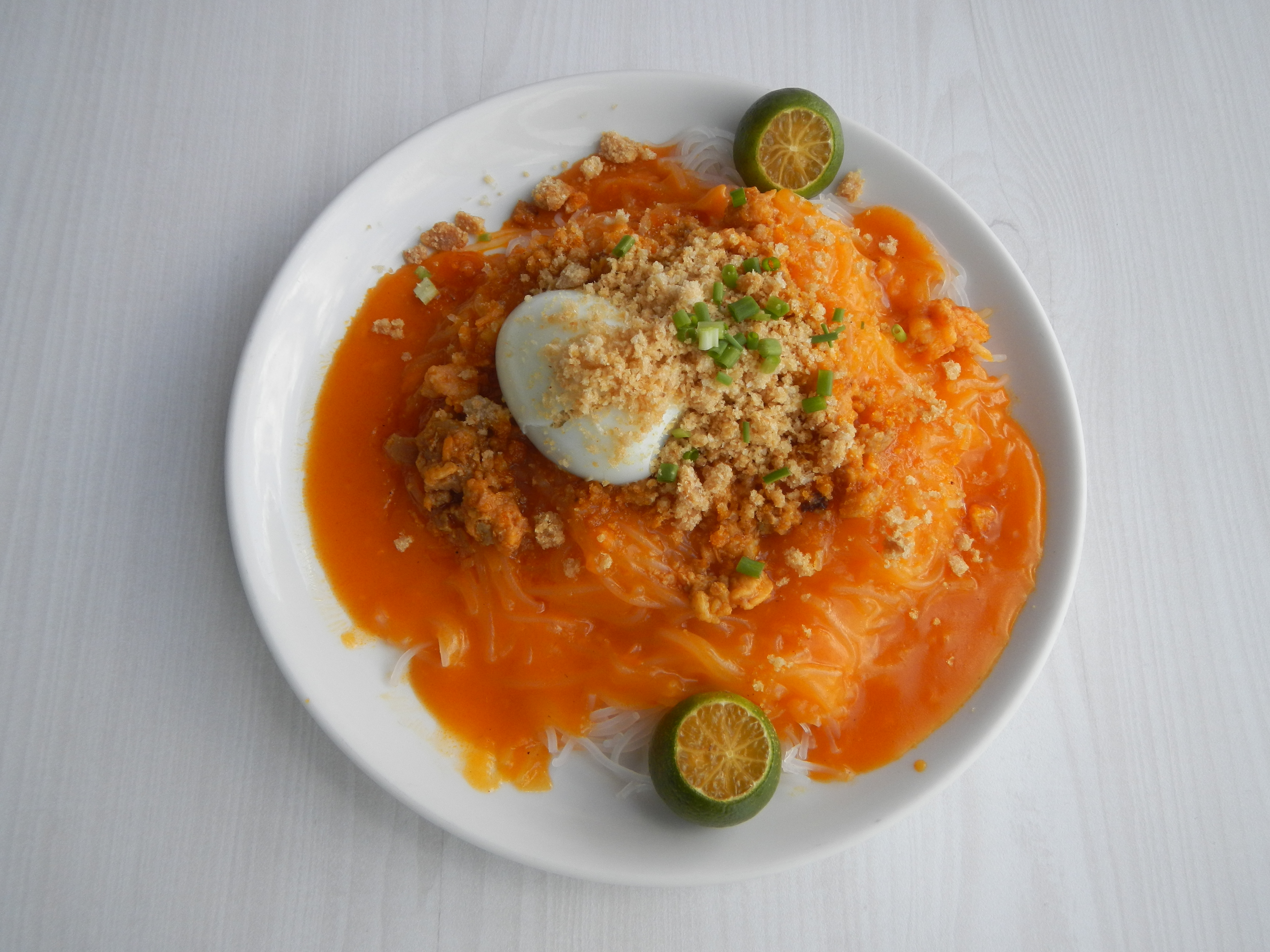
Filipino pancit palabok

- Pancit bihon (or pancit bihon guisado) is a general term for rice vermicelli dishes with a mixture of stir-fried shrimp, meat (usually pork or chicken) and various vegetables cooked in an adobo-style sauce with garlic, black pepper, soy sauce, patis (fish sauce), and other spices to taste. Usually topped with hard-boiled eggs and served with calamansi as a condiment. It is also a common filling for the empanadas of the Tausūg people known as pastil.
- Pancit choca (or pancit choca en su tinta) is a black seafood noodle dish made with squid ink and rice vermicelli from Cavite.
- Pancit palabok is a rice vermicelli dish with shrimp sauce, topped with shrimp, pork, crushed chicharon, tinapa (smoked fish) flakes, hard-boiled eggs, scallions, and toasted garlic. Served with calamansi.
- Pancit miki at bihon guisado is a combination of pancit bihon and pancit miki (egg noodles).
- Pancit canton at bihon guisado is a combination of pancit bihon and pancit canton (wheat noodles).
- In the Philippines, bihon is also made from cornstarch instead of rice; these noodles are sold as "cornstarch sticks".

==== Singapore ====
- Kerabu bee hoon is a Nyonya-style rice vermicelli dish, mixed with herbs and other seasonings.
- Hokkien mee, commonly in Singapore, consists of rice vermicelli mixed with yellow noodles and fried with shrimp, sliced cuttlefish and pork bits. Hokkien mee throughout Malaysia varies considerably due to regional differences.
- Satay bee hoon is rice vermicelli served with spicy peanut satay sauce, common in Singapore.
- Seafood bee hoon is rice vermicelli cooked with sauce and served in seafood broth and seafood such as lobster, crayfish, clams, scallops and prawns.

==== Vietnam ====
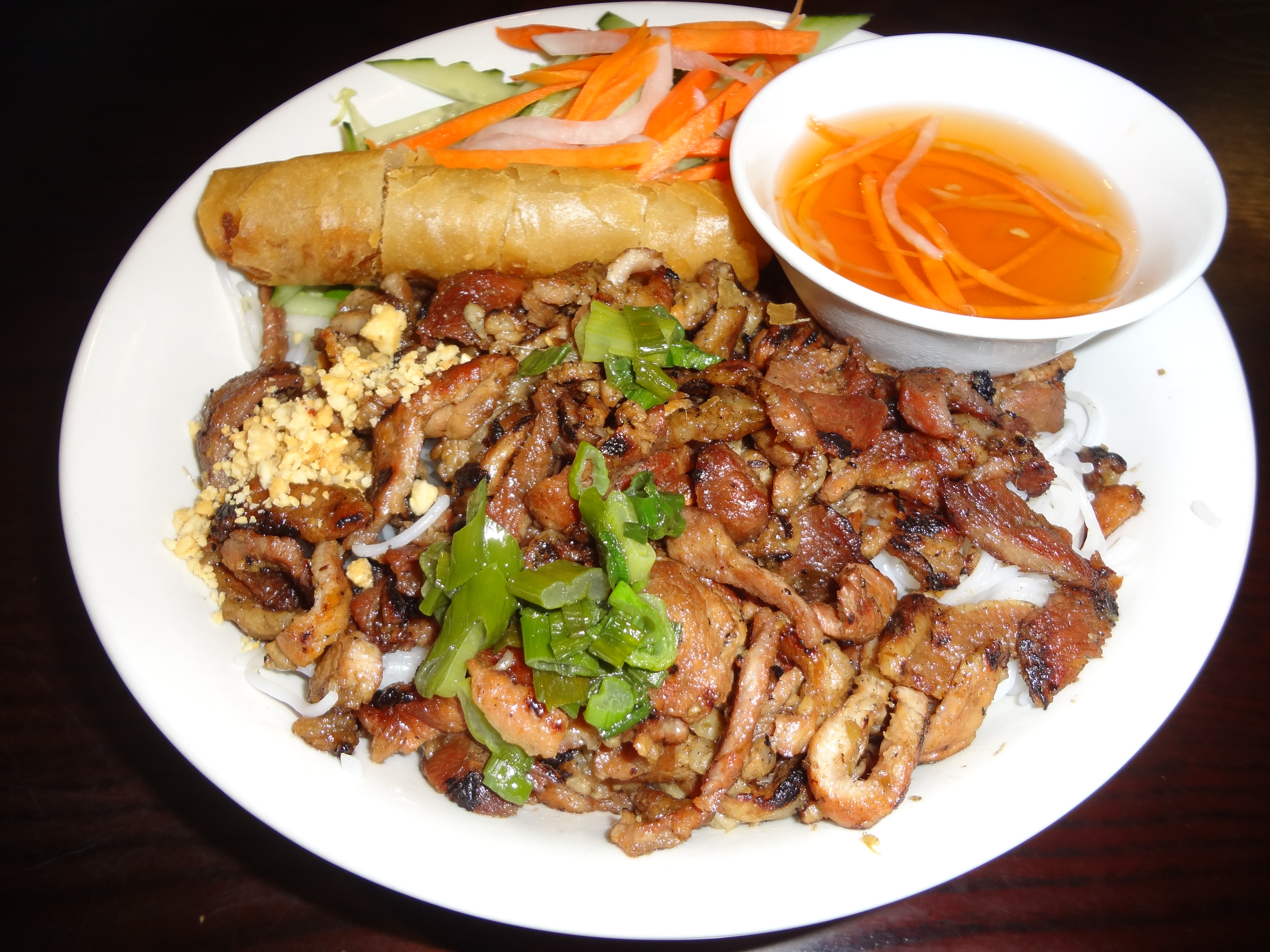
Vietnamese bún thịt nướng chả giò

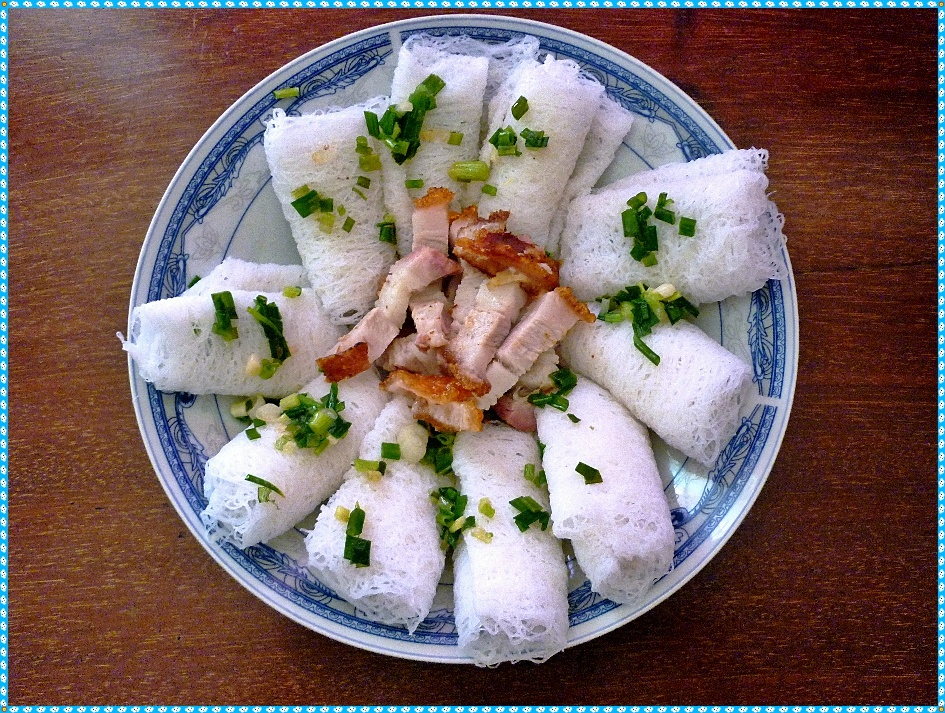
A dish of bánh hỏi in Ho Chi Minh City

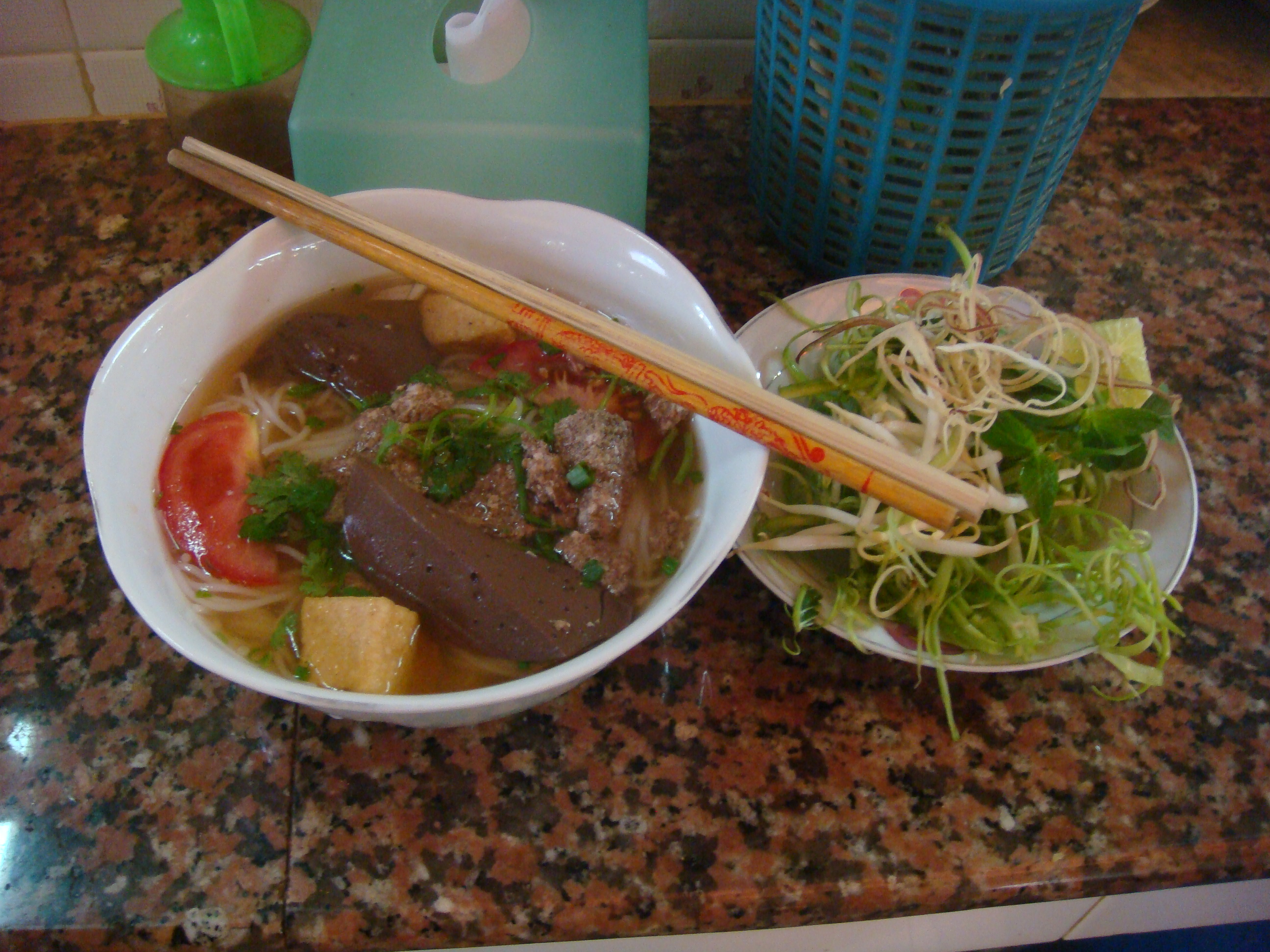
A bowl of bún riêu and a dish of vegetables

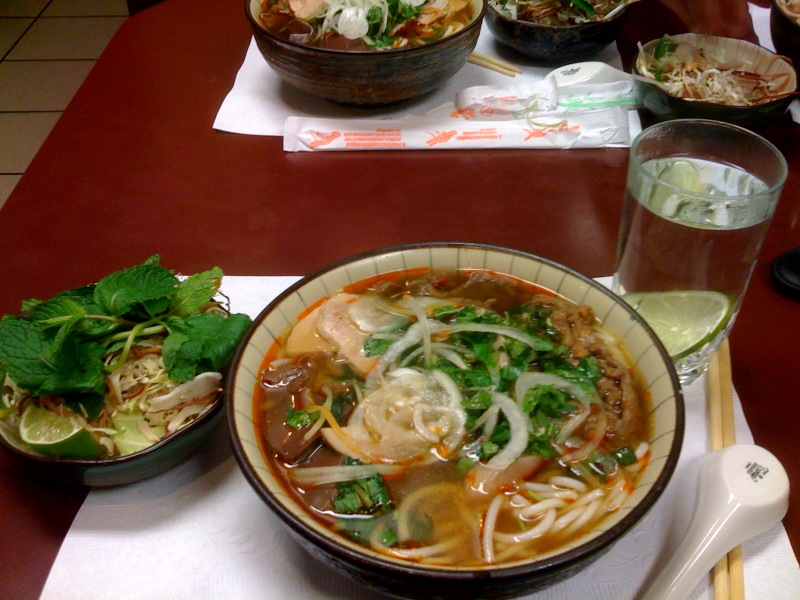
A bowl of bún bò (at Bún Bò Huế An Nam restaurant)

- Bánh hỏi—a Vietnamese dish consisting of rice vermicelli woven into intricate bundles and often topped with chopped scallions or garlic chives sauteed in oil, served with a complementary meat dish.
- Bún riêu—rice vermicelli in soup with crab meat. It has a bright, sour flavor and is typically eaten in the summer. There are many restaurants in Vietnam that sell this dish.
- Bún bò Huế—rice vermicelli in soup with beef from Huế.
- Bún chả—a dish from Hanoi consisting of grilled fatty pork and over a plate of white rice vermicelli and herbs with a side dish of dipping sauce.
- Bún thịt nướng—a Vietnamese dish consisting of grilled pork (often shredded) and vermicelli noodles over a bed of greens (salad and sliced cucumber), herbs and bean sprouts. Also, it often includes a few chopped spring rolls, spring onions, and shrimp. It is commonly served with roasted peanuts on top and a small bowl of nước mắm pha (fish sauce with garlic, chilli, sugar, lime juice, water or coconut juice).
- Gỏi cuốn—rice vermicelli with pork, shrimp and herbs in a rice paper roll. It is served with nước chấm.

== See also ==
- Chinese noodles
- Khanom chin
- Khao poon
- Laksa
- List of noodle dishes
- List of noodles
- Pancit
