= Bánh hỏi =

Vietnamese dish

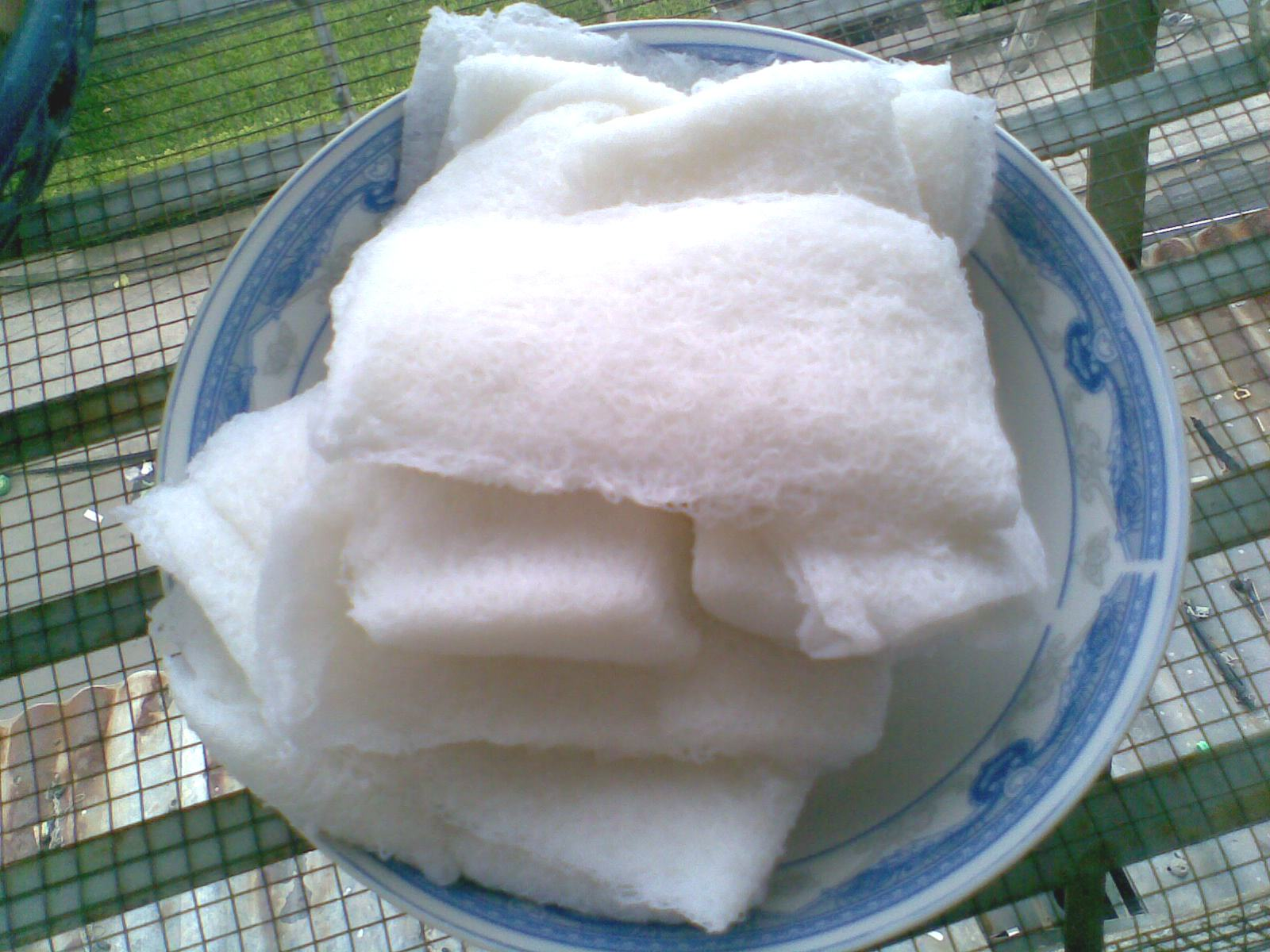
- Bowl of bánh hỏi
- Type: Noodle
- Place of origin: Vietnam
- Region or state: Bình Định Province
- Main ingredients: Rice vermicelli, scallions or garlic chives

Bánh hỏi (Vietnamese: [ɓajŋ˧˥ hɔːj˧˩; ɓan˧˥ hɔːj˧˩˧]) is a Vietnamese dish consisting of rice vermicelli woven into intricate bundles and often topped with chopped scallions or garlic chives sauteed in oil, served with a complementary meat dish. The strings of noodles are usually only as thin as a toothpick; the texture is firm enough so the noodles do not fall apart but is not at all sticky to keep the dish light.

== Origin ==
Bánh hỏi originated from the Bình Định Province (now is Gia Lai province) of Vietnam's South Central Coast region. People in Bình Định eat bánh hỏi for almost any meal during the day, instead of rice or noodle soups.

== Production ==
Making bánh hỏi is a multistep process. First, good rice is soaked in water overnight, then washed with water again three or four times until the water comes out clean. Then the rice is either ground with water into a mixture, or ground without water, but mixed into the water three or four times afterwards to leaven it without using any additional agent. The flour mixture is then either steamed and kneaded, or cooked in a pan, stirred continuously until it starts to coagulate, but no flour gets stuck on the stirring tool. This step is crucial in making bánh hỏi soft, light, and not sticky, but the strings of noodles will still have a firm texture. When the experienced bánh hỏi maker feels the dough is done, it is ready for pressing.

Special copper or aluminium cylinders, with several small holes (the size of a needle eye), shape the cooked dough into noodle form. Pressing the dough requires great strength, as the dough is hard and the holes are small, so it is usually done with leverage. When one person presses the dough, another "catches" the noodles coming out on the other side, presses them together and cuts them off every 10 cm or so, creating a kind of mesh of noodle, which is then laid onto a flat surface, but not in layers. Finally, the sheets are steamed one last time for about five minutes.

== Serving ==
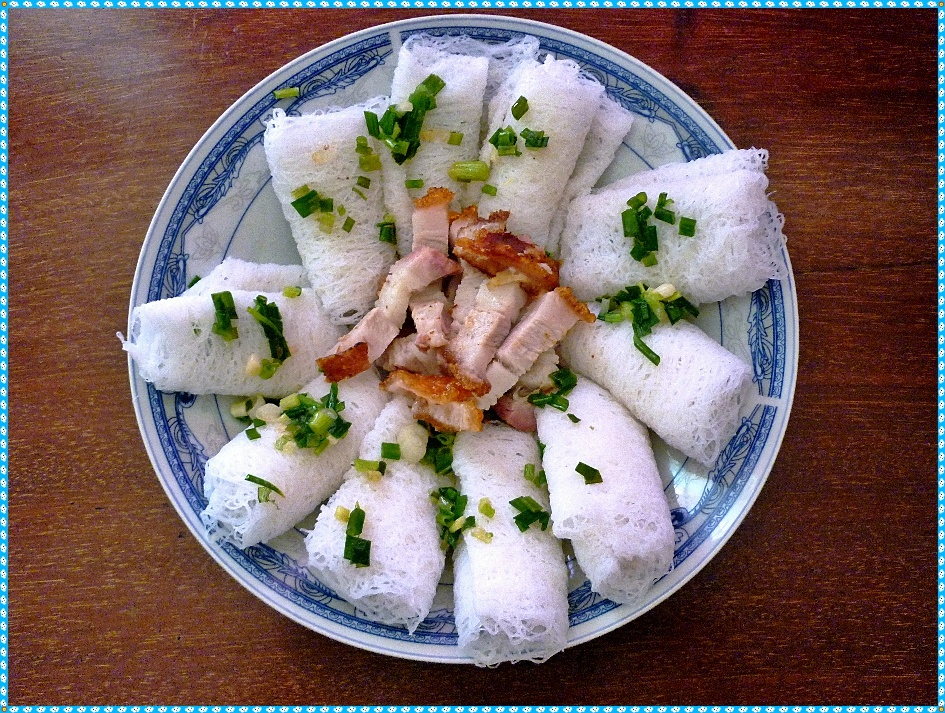
A dish of bánh hỏi in Ho Chi Minh City.

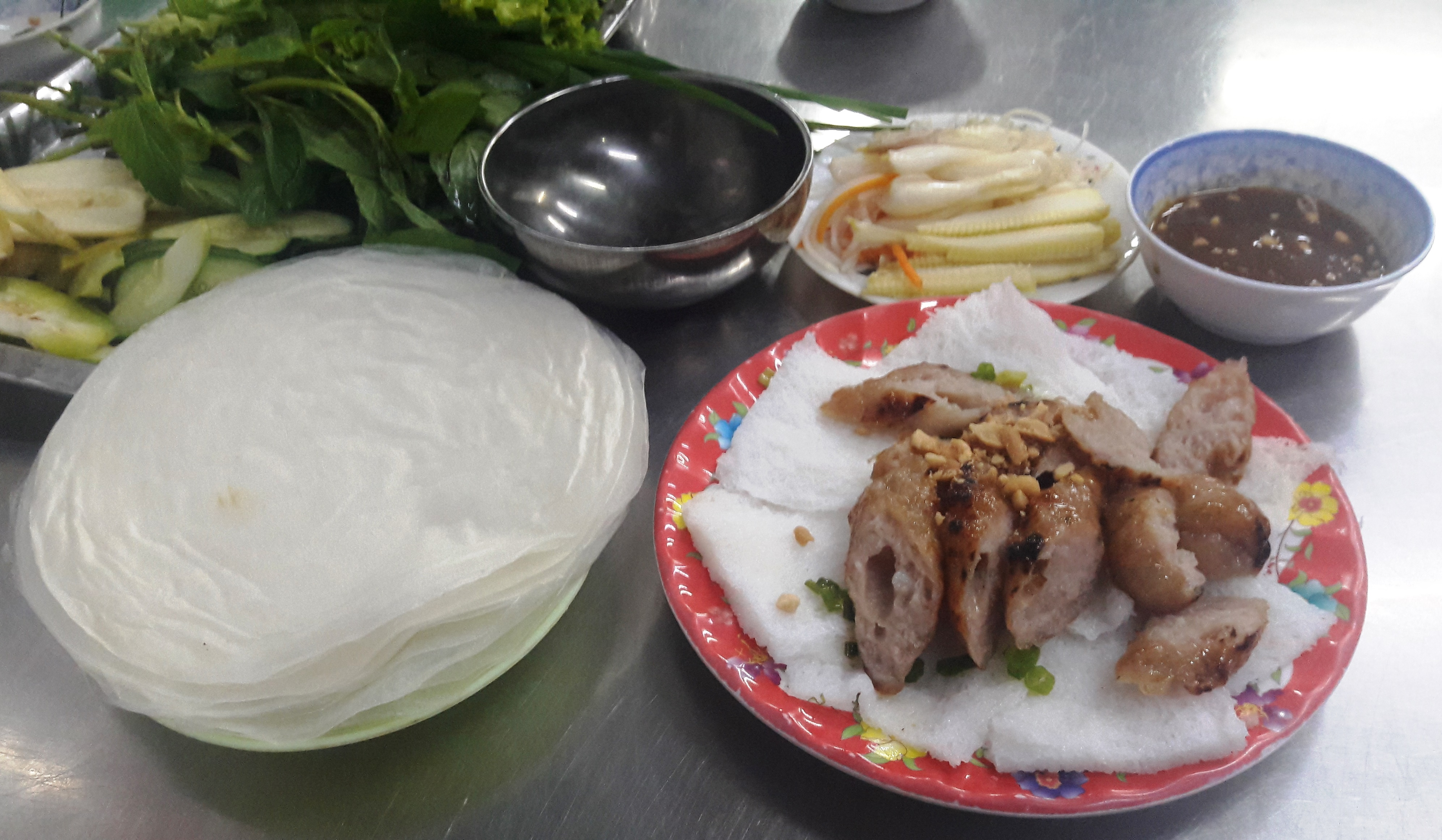
Bánh hỏi is eaten with bánh tráng

Like bún (rice vermicelli) dishes, bánh hỏi is served cold. Traditionally bánh hỏi in Bình Định is rolled into bundles and always served with chopped garlic chives. The garlic chives are quickly stir-fried with oil, its aroma and taste go well with bánh hỏi, which makes the dish enjoyable by itself and without any other kinds of herbs.

In central Vietnam, such as Huế, bánh hỏi is eaten with dried prawns and nước chấm. In southern Vietnam, bánh hỏi is eaten with a variety of meats, especially roast pork or duck. There are also bánh hỏi chả giò, bánh hỏi with shrimp paste on sugar cane stick, and bánh hỏi with grilled pork, chicken, or beef. At the Gò Duối market in Xuân Lộc commune, Sông Cầu district, Phú Yên Province, one also finds bánh hỏi lòng heo Gò Duối, which is bánh hỏi with boiled pig offal.

Since making bánh hỏi is a skillful process, the dish is highly regarded, and is served at ceremonial parties, such as weddings and ancestor memorial days.

Covering bánh hỏi tightly reduces surface drying, which can make it sour, so market sellers put fresh bánh hỏi in bamboo baskets with banana leaves, and usually leave it open to the air. For convenience or sanitary reasons, there are dried, packaged bánh hỏi, similar to dried, packaged rice vermicelli, for people who want to cook it themselves instead of buying fresh bánh hỏi from the markets.

== See also ==
- Vietnamese noodles
