= Bihun goreng =

Southeast Asian fried rice vermicelli dish

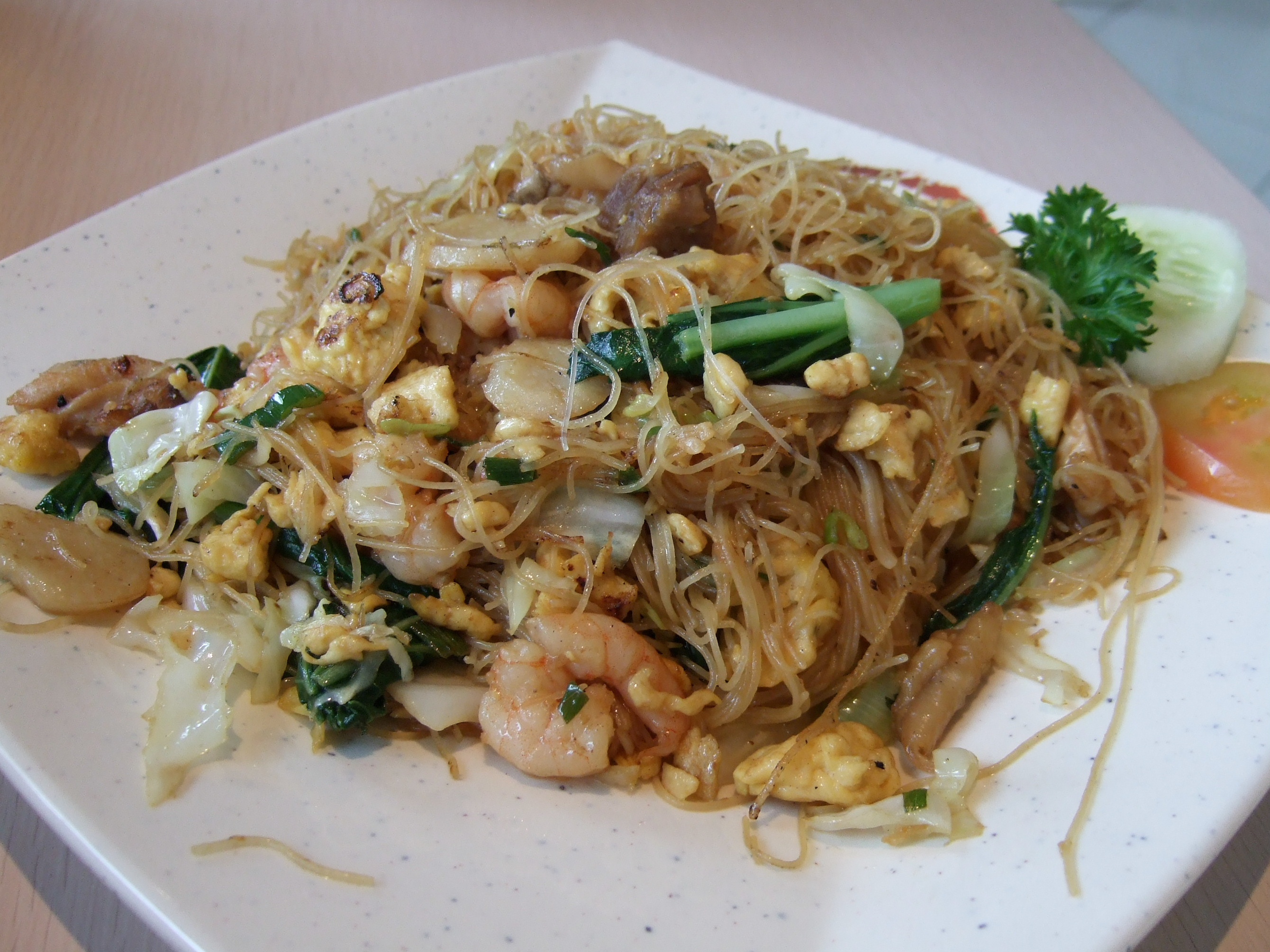
- Bihun goreng with shrimp, sliced bakso, chicken and vegetables in Indonesia
- Course: Main course
- Region or state: Maritime Southeast Asia
- Associated cuisine: Indonesia, Malaysia, Singapore
- Serving temperature: Hot
- Main ingredients: Rice vermicelli

Bihun goreng, bee hoon goreng or mee hoon goreng refers to a dish of fried noodles cooked with rice vermicelli in both the Indonesian and Malay languages. In certain countries, such as Singapore, the term goreng is occasionally substituted with its English equivalent for the name of the dish.

There is no single defined recipe for the dish, and its composition and preparation varies greatly from household to household in all relevant cultural and linguistic regions, which may include vegetarian versions.

== Variants ==
=== Indonesia ===
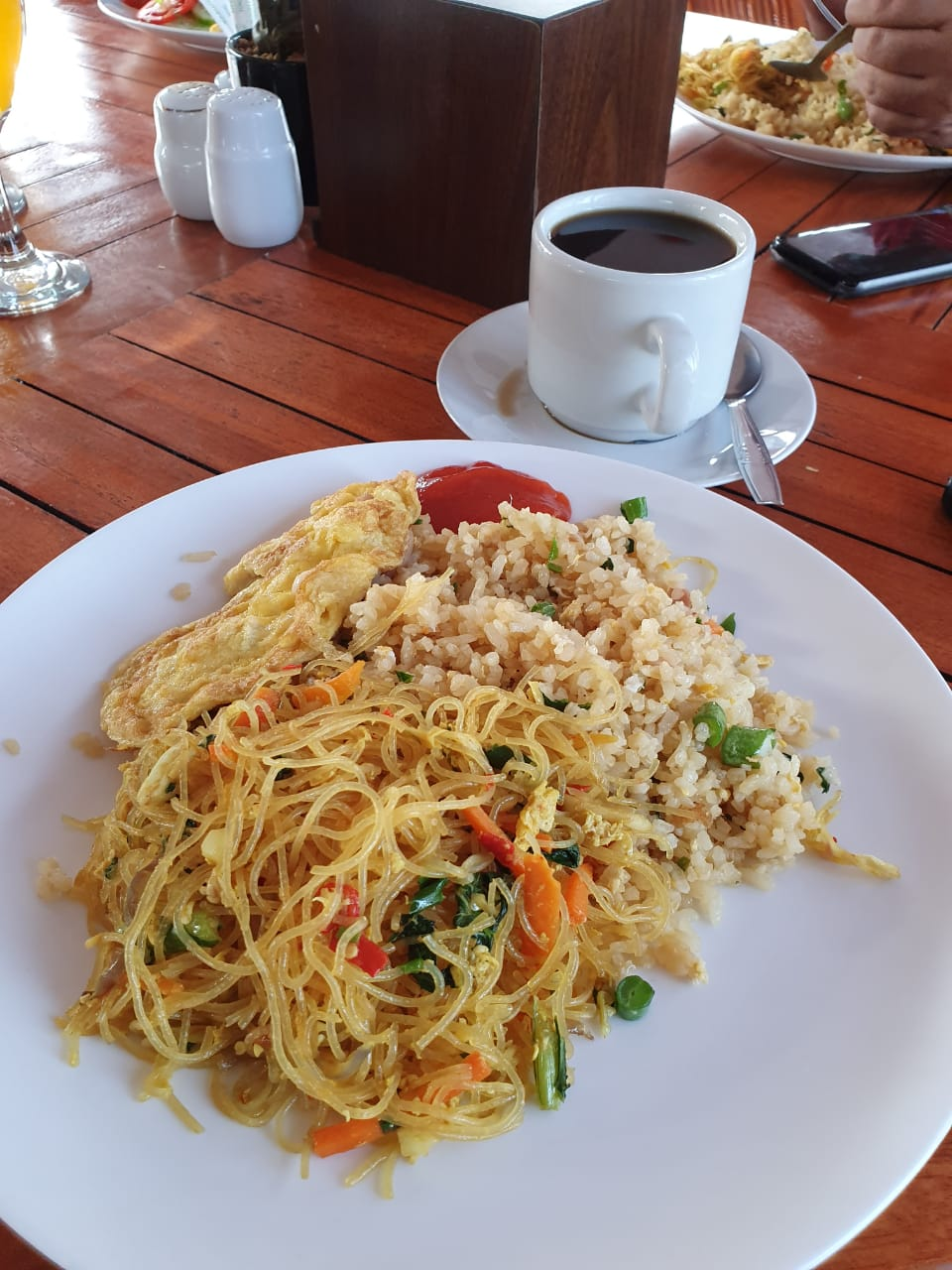
Nasi goreng and bihun goreng served with fried eggs and coffee for breakfast in an Indonesian hotel

In Indonesian cuisine, bihun goreng is associated with Chinese Indonesian and Javanese cuisine. Like mie goreng or kwetiau goreng, bihun goreng is usually seasoned with kecap manis (sweet soy sauce) and bumbu. Typical ingredients involved in its preparation include garlic, onion or shallots, fried prawn, chicken, beef, or sliced bakso (meatballs), chili, Chinese cabbage, cabbages, tomatoes, egg, and other vegetables. The dish may be accompanied with acar and garnished with fried shallots.

There are two distinct varieties—one is Chinese Indonesian version which does not use sweet soy sauce, the other is the Javanese version which does use sweet soy sauce. Bihun goreng with sweet soy sauce has that sweet and savoury flavour with smoky aroma. The Chinese Indonesian version however, uses no sweet soy sauce, thus similar to common Chinese-style stir fried rice vermicelli, akin to Singaporean fried bee hoon.

In Indonesia bihun goreng might be consumed solely as a main dish, or served as an addition or topping in other dish, such as add upon nasi uduk (fragrant coconut rice) or nasi campur (mixed rice).

=== Malaysia ===
Noteworthy variants of the dish found in Malaysia include bihun goreng utara or Northern-style fried rice vermicelli, which refers to its prevalence in the northern region of Peninsular Malaysia. A popular breakfast food and snack, it is fried to a dry texture, and seasoned with chilli powder and chives.

=== Singapore ===
In Singapore, rice vermicelli is locally known and spelled as bee hoon, mee hoon, or mai fun. The dish is generally prepared mild without any spicy seasonings, and is a popular option for breakfast.

== Gallery ==
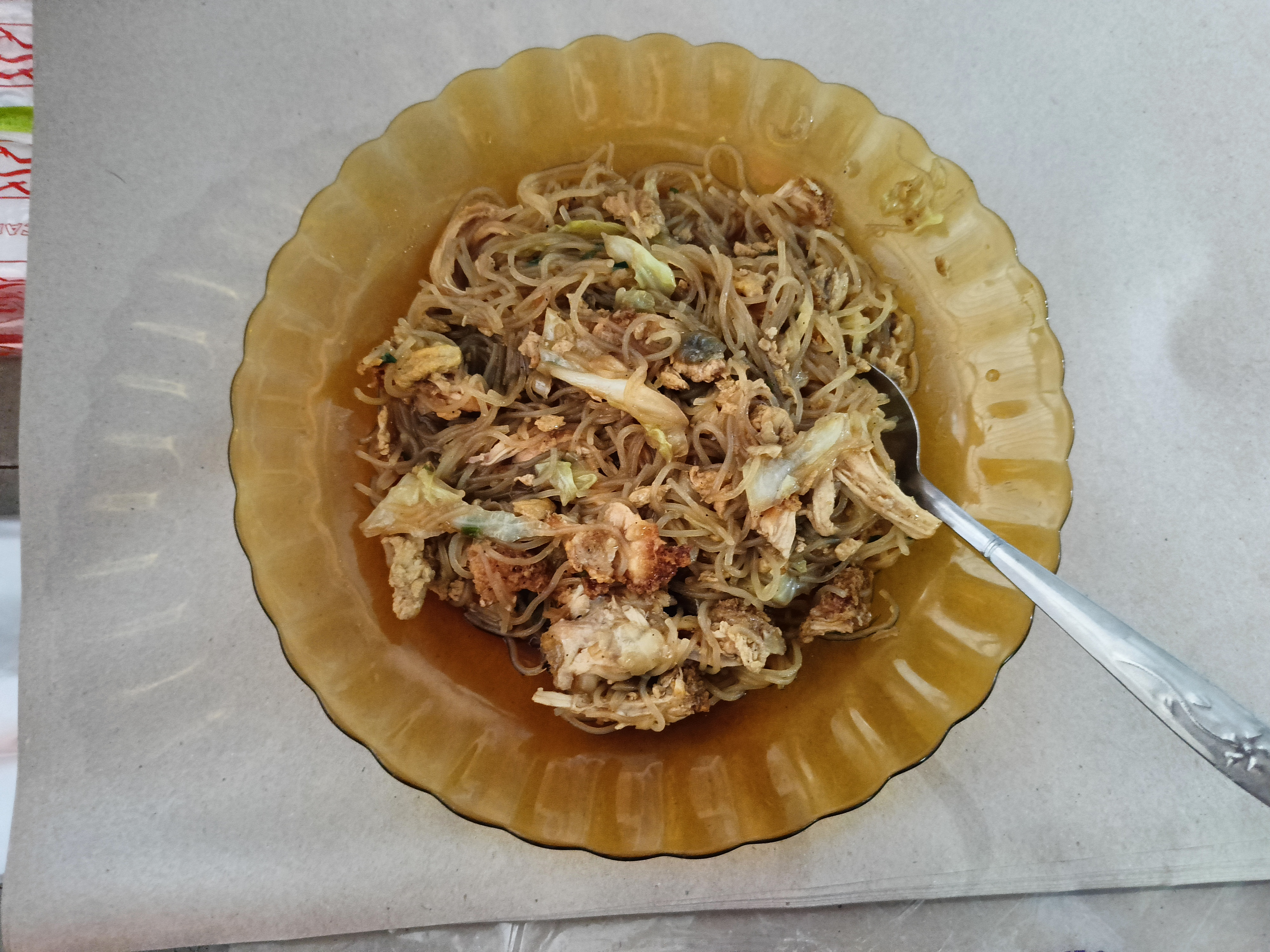
Bihun goreng with chicken

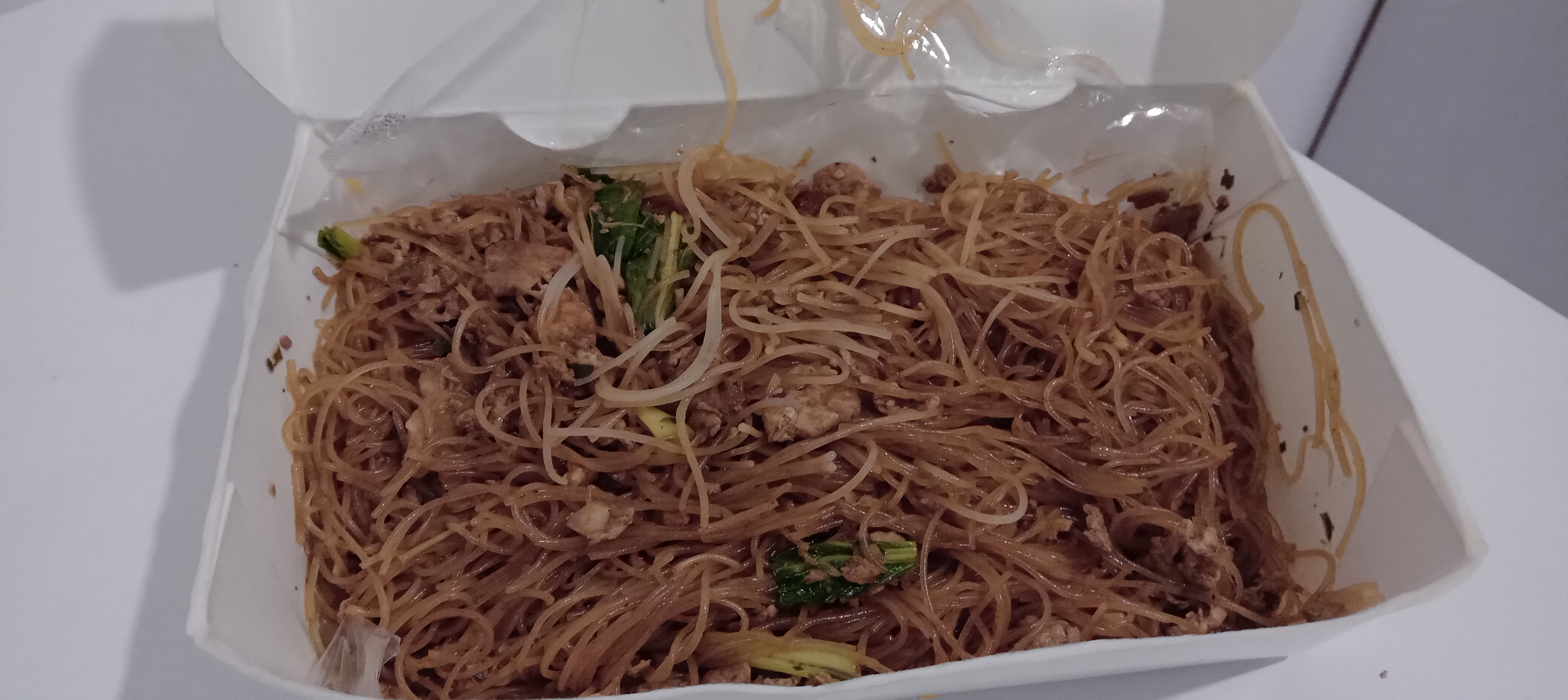
Vegetarian style bihun goreng in a take away lunch box

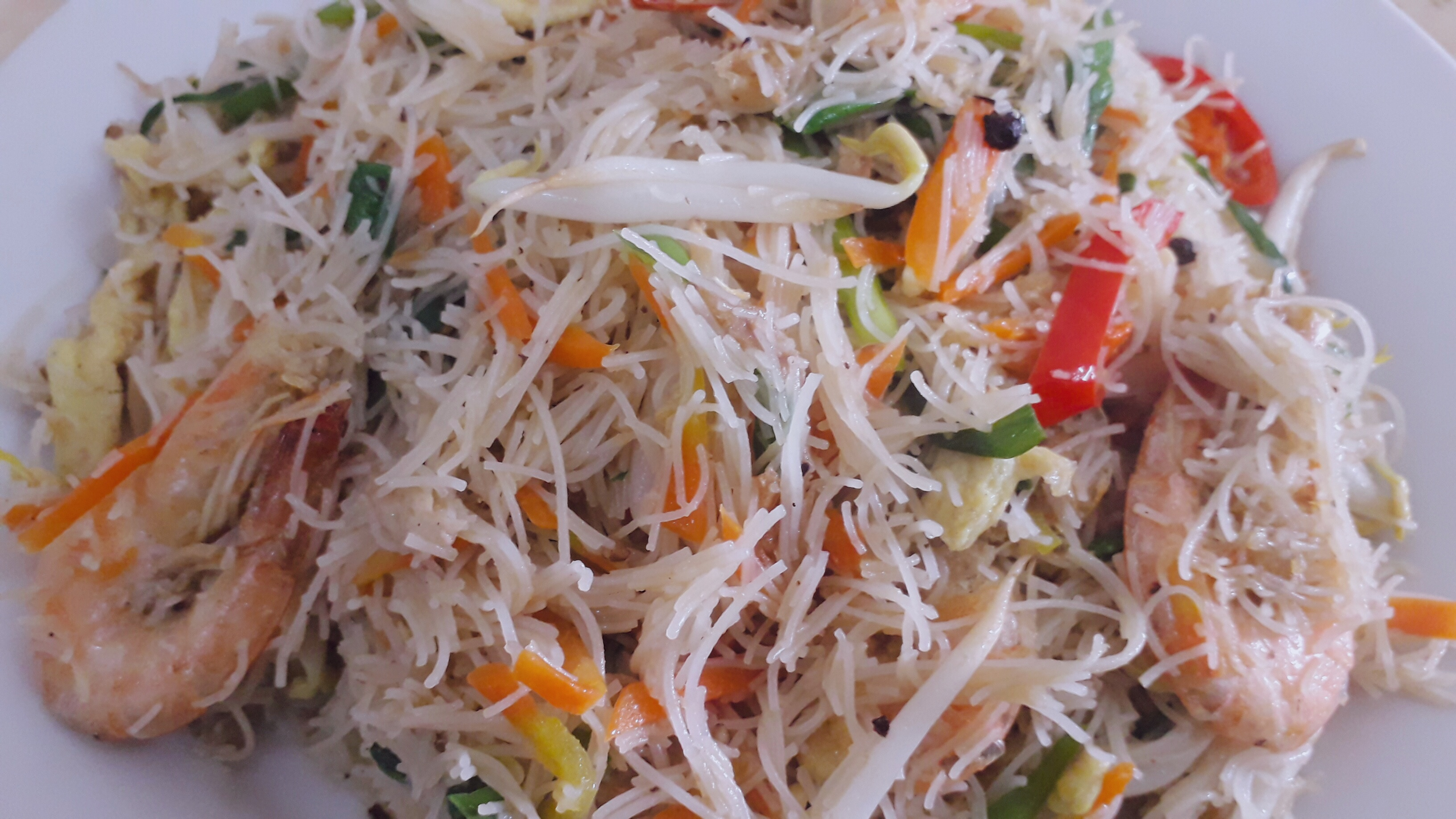
Singapore style rice noodles

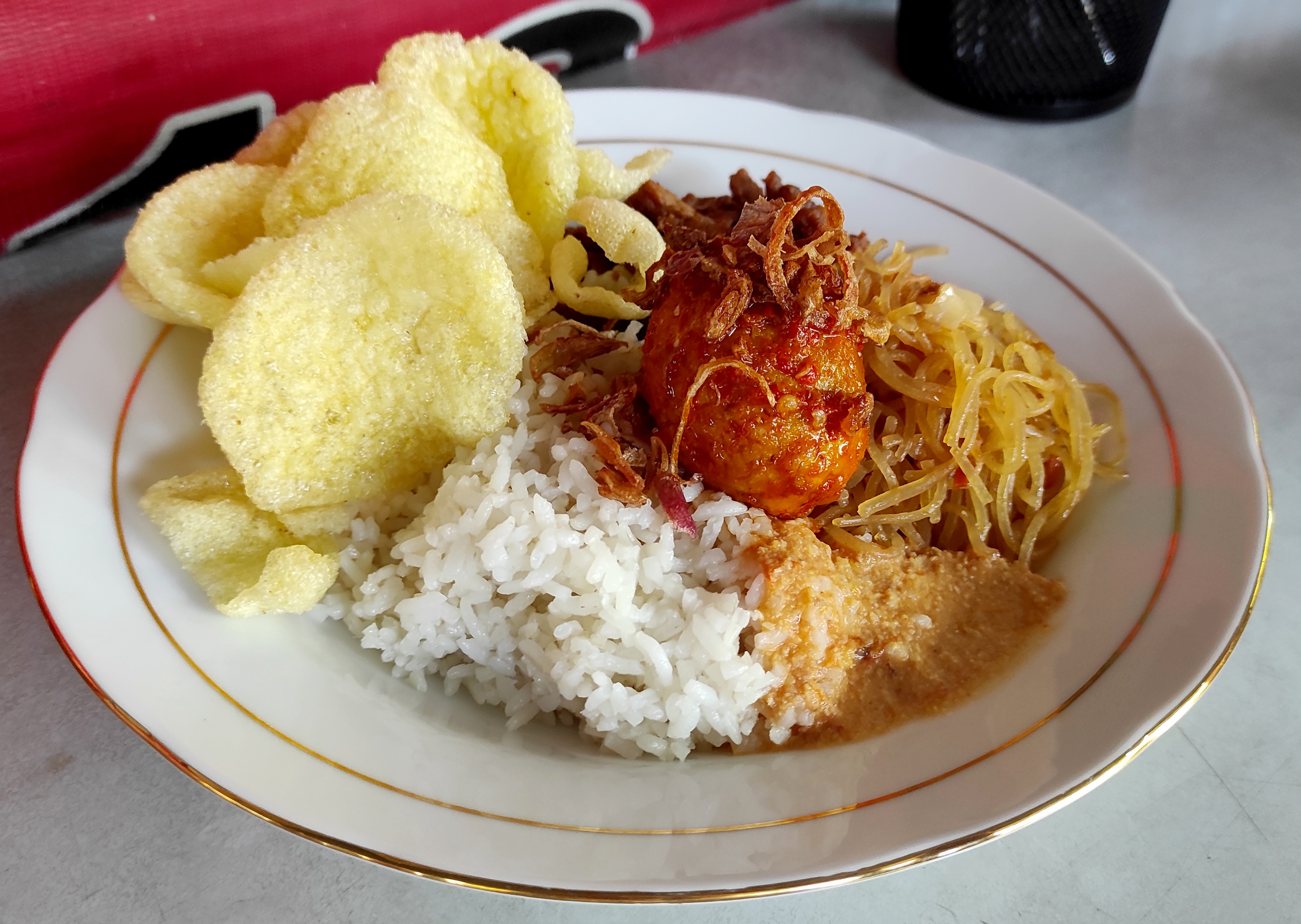
Bihun goreng as add on topping in Betawi nasi uduk in Jakarta

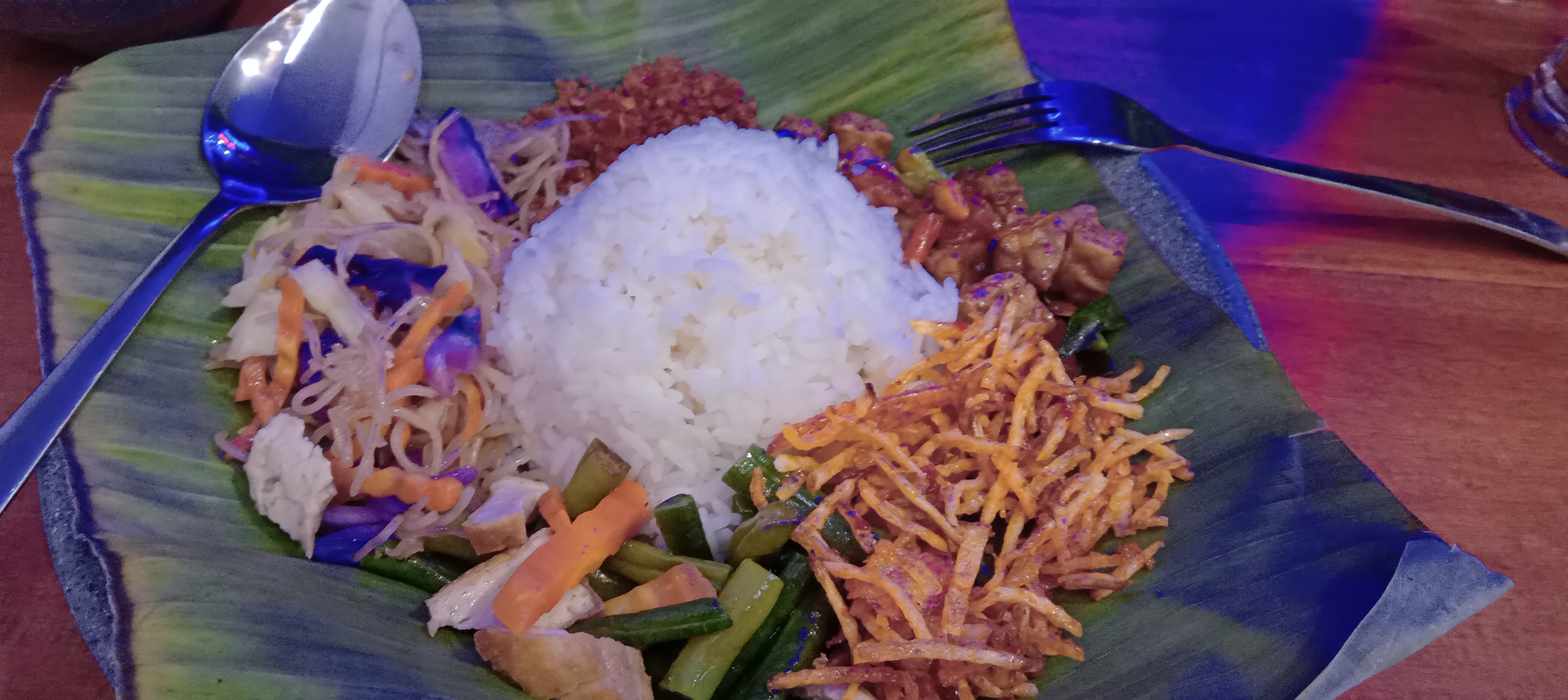
Bihun goreng as part of nasi rames in Indonesia

== See also ==
- Kwetiau goreng
- Mee goreng
- Mee siam
- Mie goreng
- Pancit
- Singapore-style noodles
- Rice noodles
- Rice vermicelli
