= Nước chấm =

Vietnamese dipping sauce

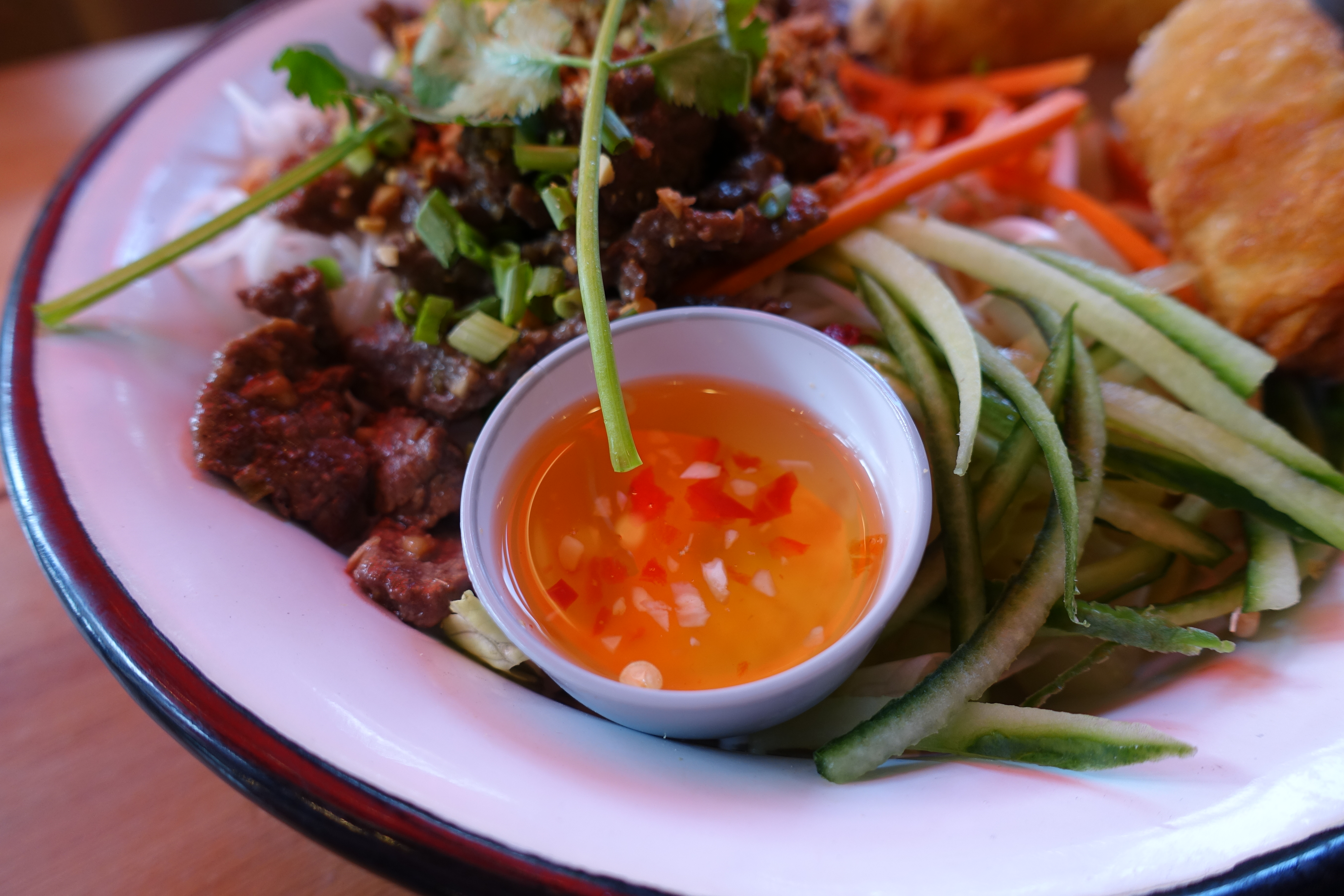
A bowl of nước chấm

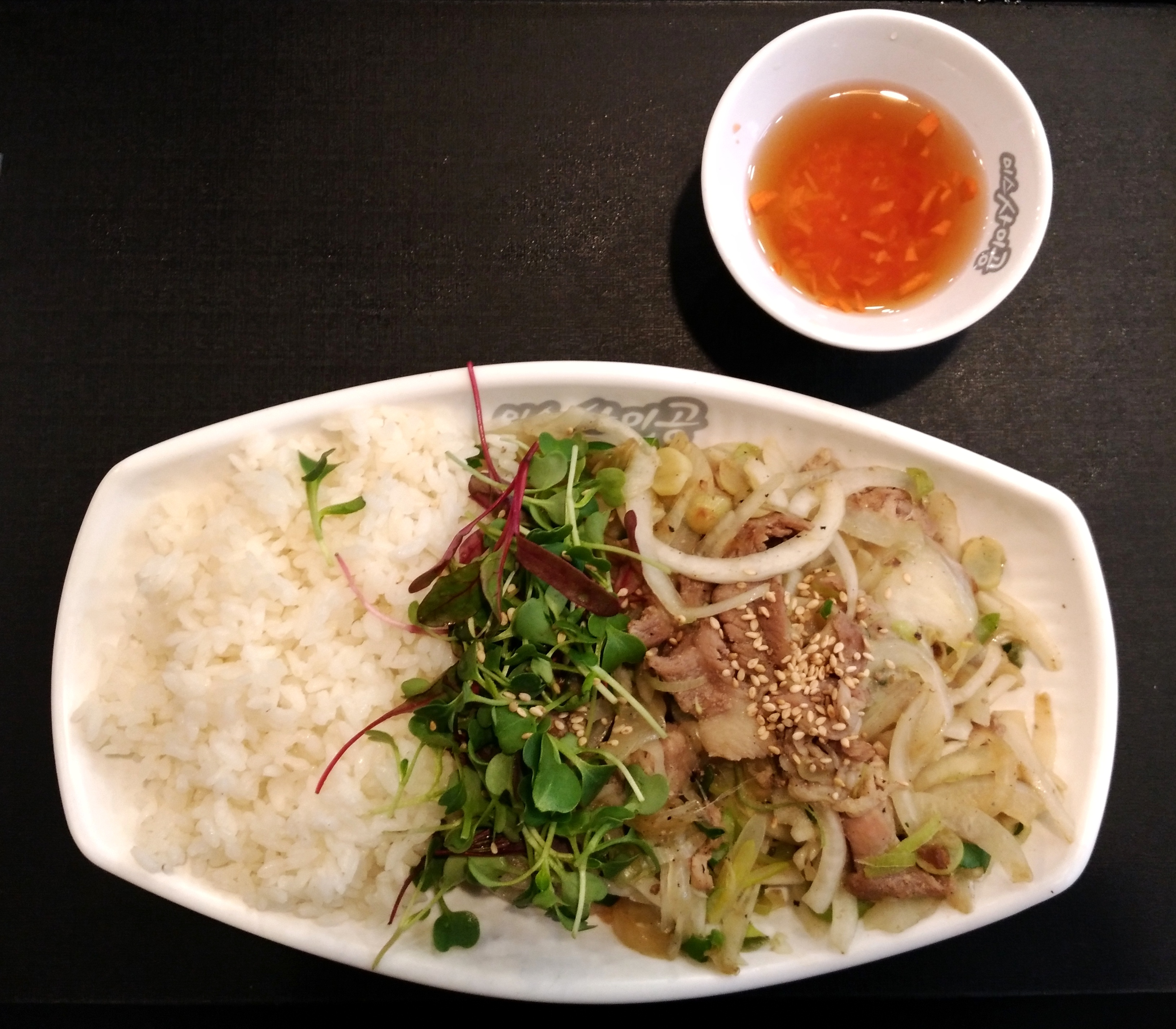
Nước chấm for pork rice

Nước chấm (Vietnamese: [nɯɤk̚˧˥ cʌm˧˥]), (Note: Approximately nwok cham or nwok chum.) or more specifically nước mắm chấm (Note: Approximately nwok mam cham or nwok mam chum.) for the fish-sauce version, is a Vietnamese dipping sauce often served as a condiment. It is a sweet, sour, salty, savoury sauce that often (but not always) contains bird's eye chili for spiciness.

== Nước mắm pha ==
Nước mắm pha (mixed fish sauce) is the most well known dipping sauce made from fish sauce. Its simplest recipe is some lime juice, or occasionally vinegar, one part fish sauce (nước mắm), one part sugar and two parts water. Vegetarians create nước chấm chay (vegetarian dipping sauce) or nước tương (soy sauce) by substituting Maggi seasoning sauce or soy sauce for fish sauce (nước mắm).

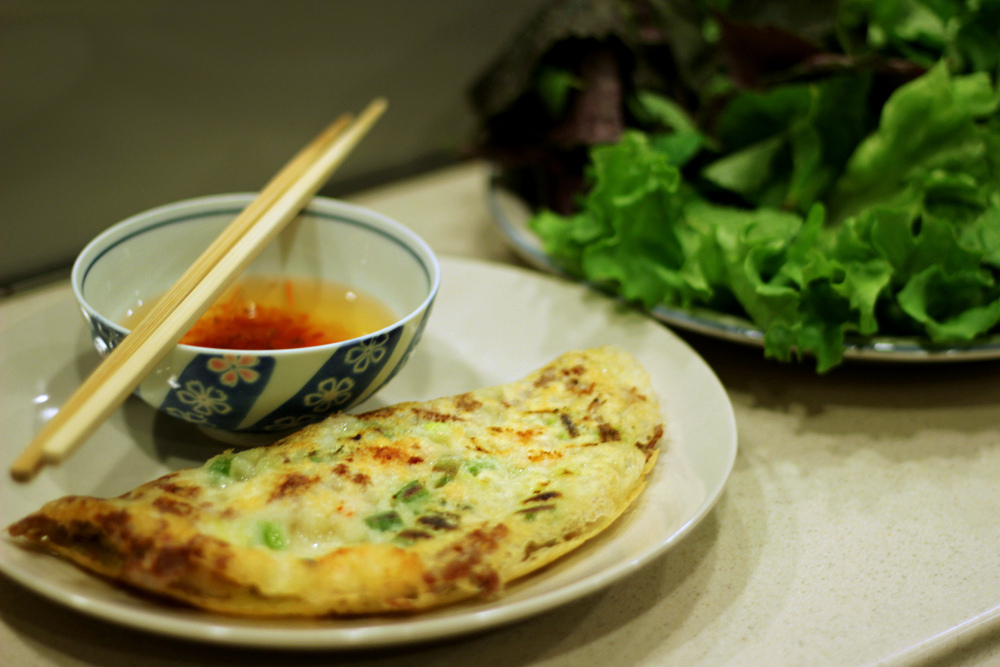
Bánh xèo with nước mắm

To this, people will usually add minced uncooked garlic, chopped or minced bird's eye chilis, and in some instances, shredded pickled carrot or white radish and green papaya for bún. Otherwise, when having seafood, such as eels, people also serve some slices of lemongrass.

It is often prepared hot on a stove to dissolve the sugar more quickly, then cooled. The flavor can be varied depending on the individual's preference, but it is generally described as pungent and distinct, sweet yet sour, and sometimes spicy.

== Varieties by region ==
People in the north of Vietnam tend to use nước mắm pha, as cooked by using the above recipes, but add broth made from pork loin and penaeid shrimp (tôm he). In the central section of the country, people like using a less dilute form of nước mắm pha that has the same proportions of fish sauce, lime, and sugar as the recipe above, but less water, and with fresh chili. Southern Vietnamese people often use palm sugar and coconut water as the sweetener.

== Uses ==
Nước mắm pha is typically served with:

- Cơm tấm, a cracked-rice dish with meat, poultry, eggs, seafood or vegetables. The toppings are often fried, grilled, braised, steamed/boiled, or stir-fried.
- Chả giò, spring rolls
- Gỏi cuốn, which are sometimes called shrimp salad rolls or "rice paper" rolls, or as spring rolls (Alternately, gỏi cuốn are served with a peanut sauce containing hoisin sauce and sometimes chili, or tương xào made from tương, a Vietnamese fermented bean paste/soy sauce.)
- Bánh cuốn or "rice rolls", where wide sheets of rice noodles rolled up, and topped (or stuffed) with stir-fried or braised meat or seafood, with soy sauce or fish sauce
- Bánh xèo, a pan-fried crêpe made from rice flour and coconut milk, and filled with pork, shrimp, onion and bean sprouts, and topped with herbs
- Bánh hỏi, very thin vermicelli layered into sheets, and separated by thin layers of mỡ hành (scallions in oil)
- Bún, rice noodles with meat, poultry, eggs, seafood or vegetables. The toppings are often fried, grilled, braised, steamed/boiled, or stir-fried.

== See also ==
- List of dips
- List of sauces
