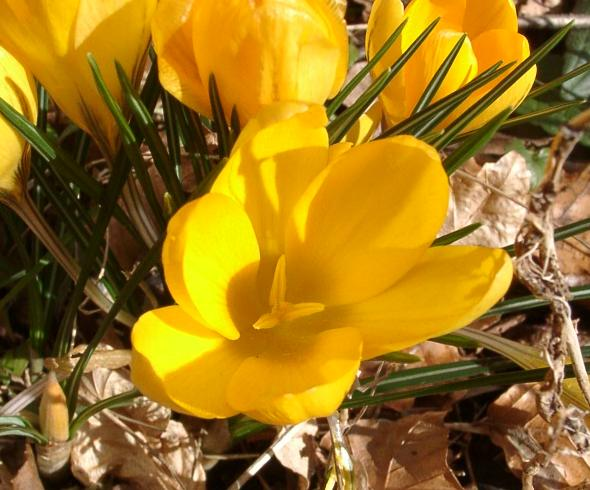

Scientific classification
- Kingdom: Plantae
- Clade: Embryophytes
- Clade: Tracheophytes
- Clade: Angiosperms
- Clade: Monocots
- Order: Asparagales
- Family: Iridaceae
- Genus: Crocus
- Species: C. chrysanthus

Binomial name
- Crocus chrysanthus (Herb.) Herb.

Subspecies
- Crocus chrysanthus subsp. chrysanthus; Crocus chrysanthus subsp. multifolius Papan. & Zacharof

Synonyms
- Crocus annulatus var. chrysanthus Herb.

= Crocus chrysanthus =

Species of flowering plant

Crocus chrysanthus, the snow crocus or golden crocus, is a species of flowering plant in the family Iridaceae.

== Description ==
C. chrysanthus bears vivid orange-yellow bowl-shaped flowers, and it has smaller corms and a smaller flower than the giant Dutch crocus (Crocus vernus), although it produces more flowers per corm than the latter. Its common name, "snow crocus", derives from its exceptionally early flowering period, blooming about two weeks before the giant crocus, and often emerging through the snow in late winter or early spring. The leaves are narrow with a silver central stripe. Its height is between 3 and 4 inches (7.6 and 10.2 cm).

== Etymology ==
The specific epithet chrysanthus means "golden-flowered".

== Distribution and habitat ==
It is native to southeastern Europe and Turkey, and is an introduced species in Czechoslovakia, Germany, and Great Britain.

== Cultivars ==
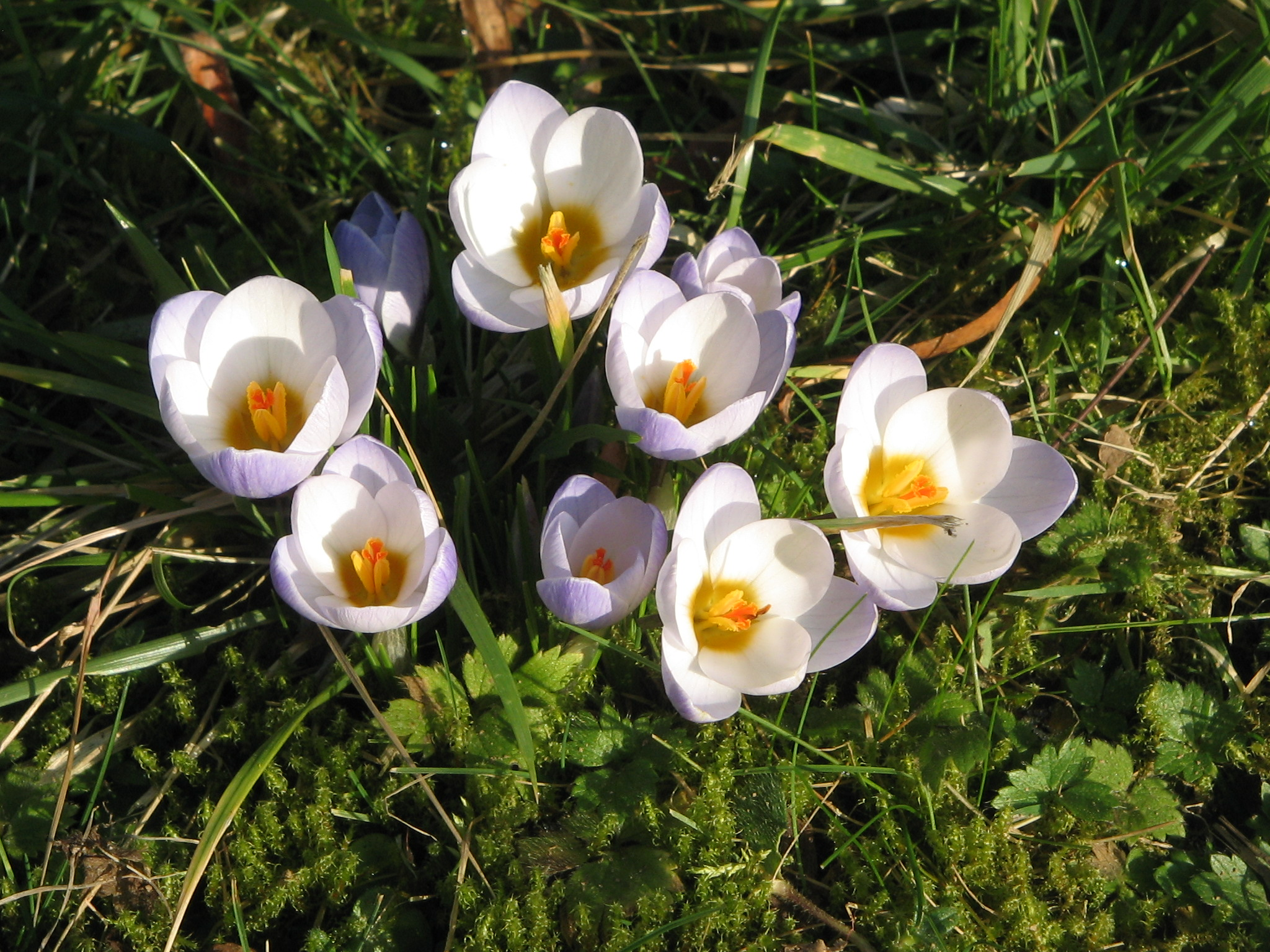
Crocus chrysanthus 'Blue Pearl' won the Royal Horticultural Society's Award of Garden Merit.

Crocus chrysanthus cultivars are selections from Crocus chrysanthus and hybrids of this species with several subspecies of Crocus biflorus and Crocus aerius. Yellow cultivars are selections of Crocus chrysanthus. Blue and white cultivars are hybrids or selections close to Crocus biflorus.

An intensive hybridisation and selection programme was initiated by Jan Hoog (Van Tubergen nursery) and E.A. Bowles involving crosses between C. chrysanthus and a number of forms of C. biflorus; the results with larger flowers and usually flower markings and colors were named.

Several of their numerous selections are still available. Examples include the following:

- 'Advance': inside yellow, outside violet-blue
- 'Ard Schenk': white with bronze throat
- 'Blue Pearl' agm: pale lavender or lobelia-blue with a bronze-yellow throat and base; rich blue tepal backs, paler within and with a yellow basal blotch
- 'Blue Peter': midnight blue outside, palest blue within
- 'Cream Beauty' agm: creamy yellow with bronze throat
- 'Goldilocks' agm: butter yellow with bronze feathering
- 'Ladykiller' Pale lilac-white interior and deep purple-violet exterior with white margins
- 'Prince Claus': white, blue flash on exterior
- 'Romance': inside creamy, outside blueish
- 'Saturnus': yellow inside, dark purple outside
- 'Skyline': inside light blue, outside bright blue
- 'Snow Bunting' agm: white inside, outside creamy white with lilac feathering; bronze throat
- 'Zwanenburg Bronze' agm: gold yellow, outside bronze

Those cultivars marked agm have gained the Royal Horticultural Society's Award of Garden Merit.
