= DYC =

DYC may refer to:

- Damned yellow composite, any yellow flower in the family Asteraceae
- Dartford Youth Council, a county youth-led organisation in the United Kingdom
- Defend Your Castle, a Flash game by XGen Studios
- Destilerías y Crianza del Whisky S.A., a Spanish brand of whisky
- Detroit Yacht Club
- Department of Youth Corrections, for young offenders
- Dhananjaya Y. Chandrachud, the 50th Chief Justice of India
