= Minibeast =

Common term for a small invertebrate

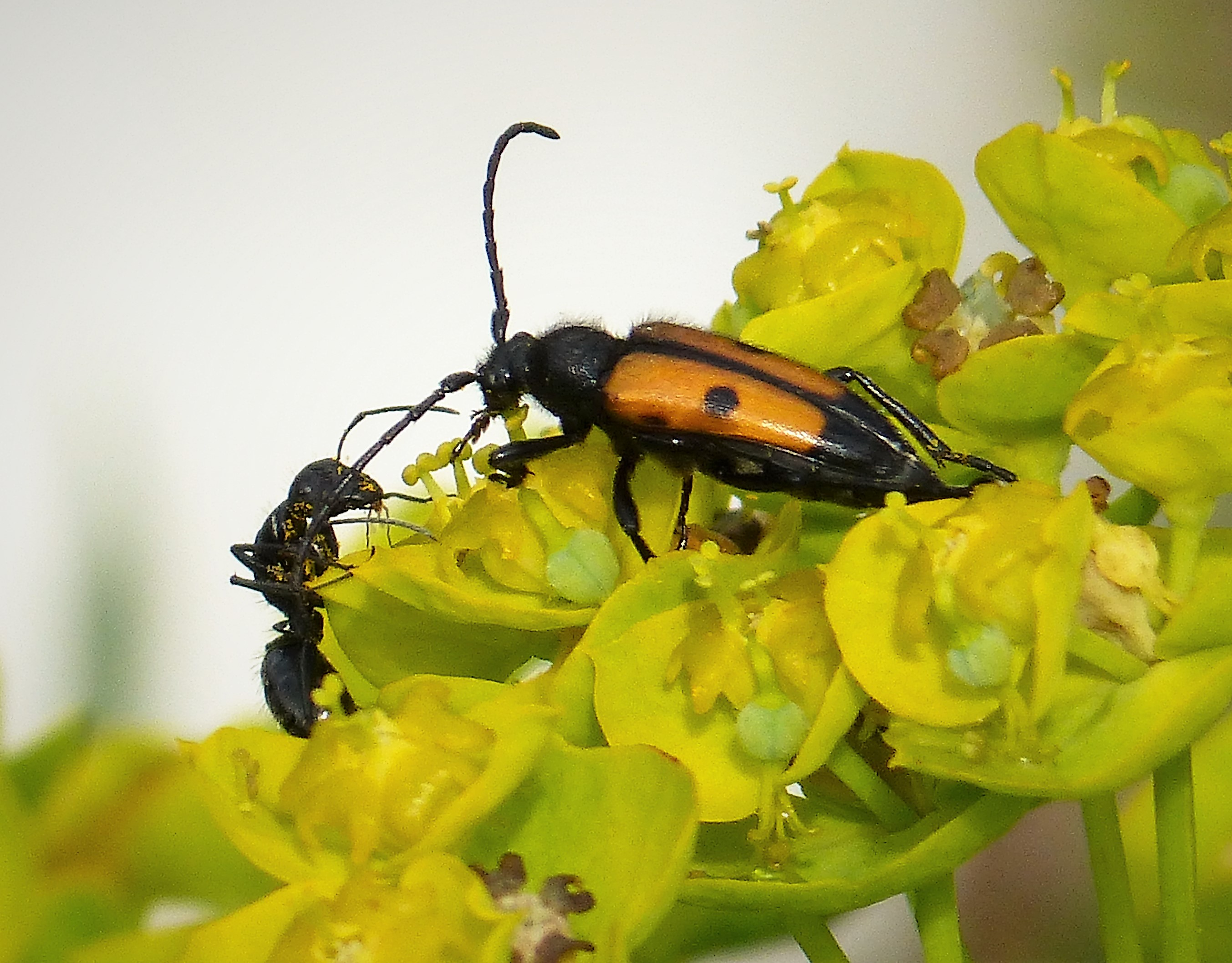
Two minibeasts: a Camponotus vagus carpenter ant encountering a Vadonia beetle

In the context of ecological literacy, arthropods and other small invertebrates are often referred to by informal names such as minibeasts, bugs, creepy crawlies (-ie and -y in the singular), or minifauna (contrasting with megafauna). The term is used for spiders, insects, woodlice, centipedes, slugs, snails, worms and many other animals.

== Definition ==
The British-based Young People's Charitable Trust defines minibeasts as "small animals" in a factsheet written for young readers. There is a "Minibeast Zooseum" in Michigan dedicated to invertebrates.

Minibeasts, as indicated by their name, are generally miniature compared to pets and livestock that people are more often familiar with. The study of minibeasts is common as part of the primary school curriculum. Studying minibeasts is a very effective way to observe many biological concepts first hand, which is not possible with many larger animals. Life cycles, food chains, and bodily structure and function are just some of the basic elements of biological science which can be easily explained using minibeasts. "Bugs Alive!" at Melbourne Museum features a huge number of live minibeasts with detailed information about them, while services such as "Minibeast Wildlife" and "Travelbugs" take live minibeasts to school and provide educational resources.

== See also ==
- Damned yellow composite—Numerous difficult-to-identify dandelion-like plants
- Little brown bird
- Little brown mushroom—Difficult-to-identify mushrooms
- Small shelly fauna
