= Inkpen Crocus Field =

Protected area in Berkshire, England

Inkpen Crocus Fields
- Site of Special Scientific Interest
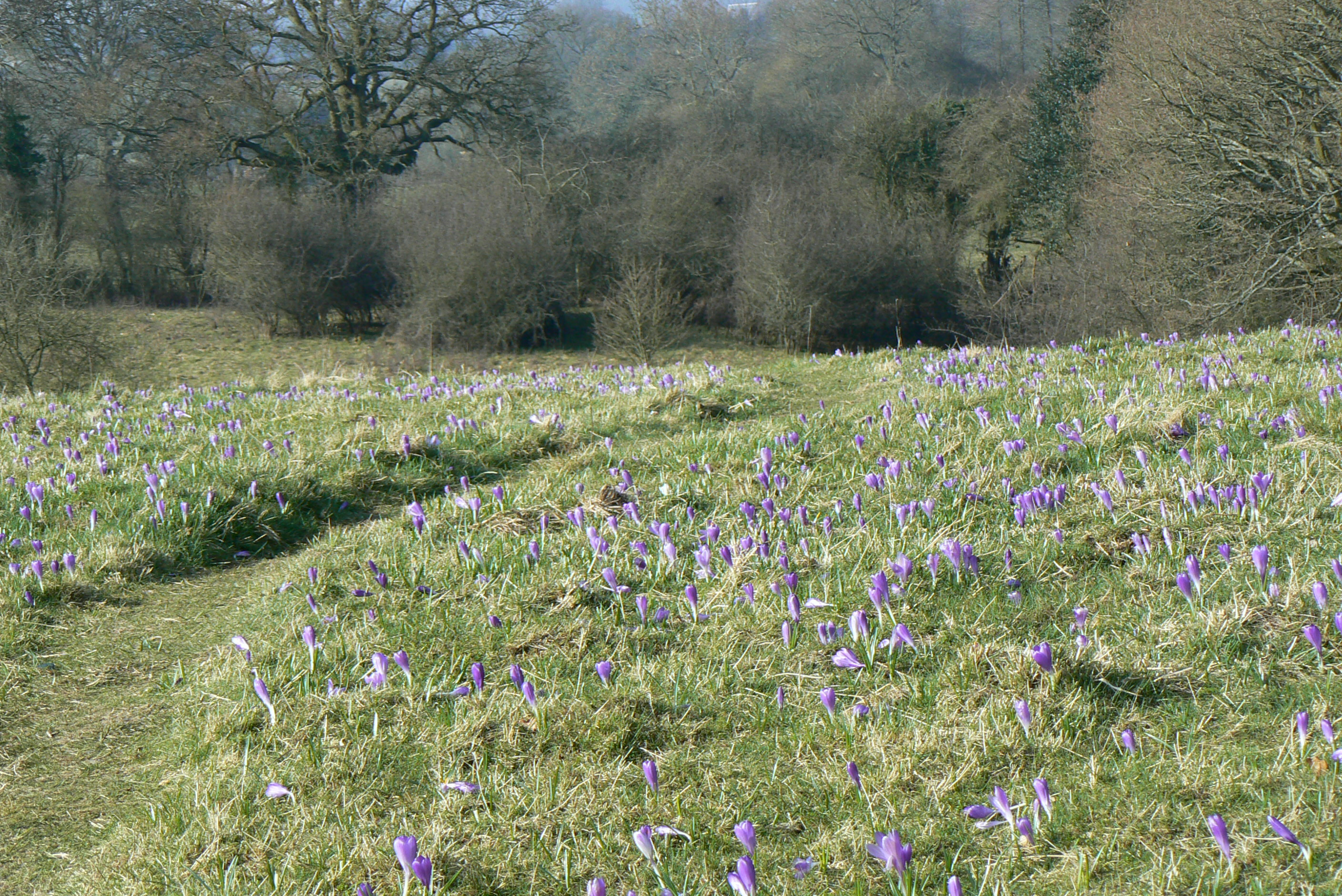

- Location within Berkshire
- Location of Inkpen Crocus Fields.
- Area of search: Berkshire
- Grid reference: SU 369 639
- Coordinates: 51.373°N 1.471°W
- Interest: Biological
- Area: 3.1 hectares (7.7 acres)
- Notification date: 1986
- Location map: Magic Map

Inkpen Crocus Fields is a 3.1-hectare (7.7-acre) biological Site of Special Scientific Interest near Inkpen in Berkshire. It is managed by the Berkshire, Buckinghamshire and Oxfordshire Wildlife Trust.

== Geography ==
The field is old pasture which has not been ploughed or 'improved' with fertilisers. Cattle are used to graze the site in the summer and autumn to ensure coarse grasses don't out-compete the flower-rich sward and orchids.

The crocus field slopes down to a spring-fed stream, then rises to become fine meadowland. Along the edge of the pasture an old hedgerow offers food and refuge to a host of birds.

== History ==
Inkpen parish records have shown the crocuses have been there for at least 200 years. There is a local legend that 12th-century Crusaders brought the crocuses back from Europe as a source of saffron to flavour food.

In 1986 the site was designated a site of special scientific interest (SSSI). The site was created as a SSSI not for its crocuses, as they are non-native, but for its species-rich meadowland.

== Fauna ==
The site has the following fauna:

=== Birds ===
- Dunnock
- Song thrush
- Eurasian blackcap
- Common chiffchaff
- Lesser whitethroat
- Willow warbler
- Northern lapwing

=== Mammals ===
- Dexter cattle

=== Invertebrates ===
- Bombus terrestris

== Flora ==
The site has the following flora:

- Crocus vernus
- Cynosurus cristatus
- Centaurea nigra
- Festuca rubra
- Lotus corniculatus
- Anthoxanthum odoratum
- Trifolium pratense
- Lathyrus pratensis
- Conopodium majus
- Ranunculus acris
- Leucanthemum vulgare
- Ajuga reptans
- Sorrel
- Danthonia decumbens
- Succisa pratensis
- Stachys officinalis
- Pedicularis sylvatica
- Ranunculus repens
- Caltha palustris
- Dactylorhiza fuchsii
- Lathyrus montanus
- Saxifraga granulata
- Ficaria verna
- Ranunculus flammula
- Primula vulgaris
- Cirsium palustre
- Juncus articulatus
- Juncus effusus
- Dactylis glomerata
- Holcus lanatus
- Deschampsia cespitosa
- Lolium perenne
- Galanthus nivalis
