= Little Grey =

Little grey or little gray may refer to:

== Animals ==
- Little grey flycatcher, a bird species
- Little grey greenbul, a bird species
- The little gray kiwi or little spotted kiwi, Apteryx owenii is a small New Zealand bird
- Little gray rattlesnake, Sistrurus catenatus is a venomous pitviper species of snake
- Little grey woodpecker, a bird species
- Little grey bird, a birding term for an undistinguished bird

== Other uses ==
- The Little Grey Men, a children's book by Denys Watkins-Pitchford
- Ferguson TE20, a tractor model commonly known as Little Grey Fergie
- Lexie Grey, nicknamed Little Grey, a television character on Grey's Anatomy
- Little Grey River, or the Māwheraiti, a river of the West Coast Region of New Zealand
