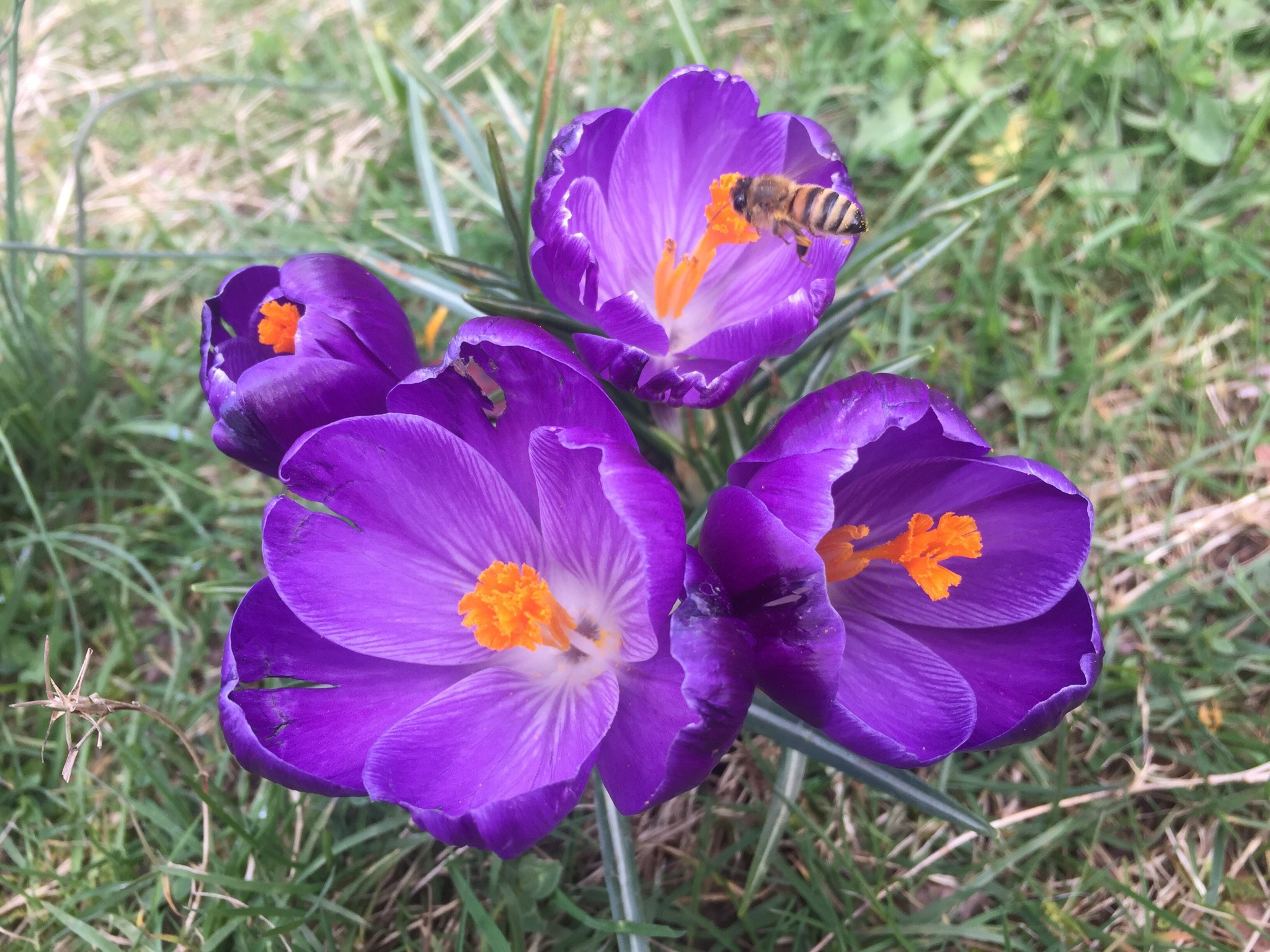

Scientific classification
- Kingdom: Plantae
- Clade: Tracheophytes
- Clade: Angiosperms
- Clade: Monocots
- Order: Asparagales
- Family: Iridaceae
- Genus: Crocus
- Species: C. vernus

Binomial name
- Crocus vernus (L.) Hill

= Crocus vernus =

Species of flowering plant

Crocus vernus (spring crocus, giant crocus) is a species of flowering plant in the family Iridaceae, native to the Alps, the Pyrenees, and the Balkans. Its cultivars and those of Crocus flavus (Dutch crocus) are used as ornamental plants. The Dutch crocuses are larger than the other cultivated crocus species (e.g., Crocus chrysanthus). Depending on the year, Crocus vernus starts flowering about the same time or up to 2 weeks after Crocus chrysanthus (snow crocus) starts flowering. Height: 4–6 inches (10–15 cm).

== Taxonomy ==
The Latin specific epithet vernus refers to both 'vernal' (spring) and 'crocus'.

== Habitat ==
Within Britain, it can be found in grasslands, including churchyards and roadside verges.

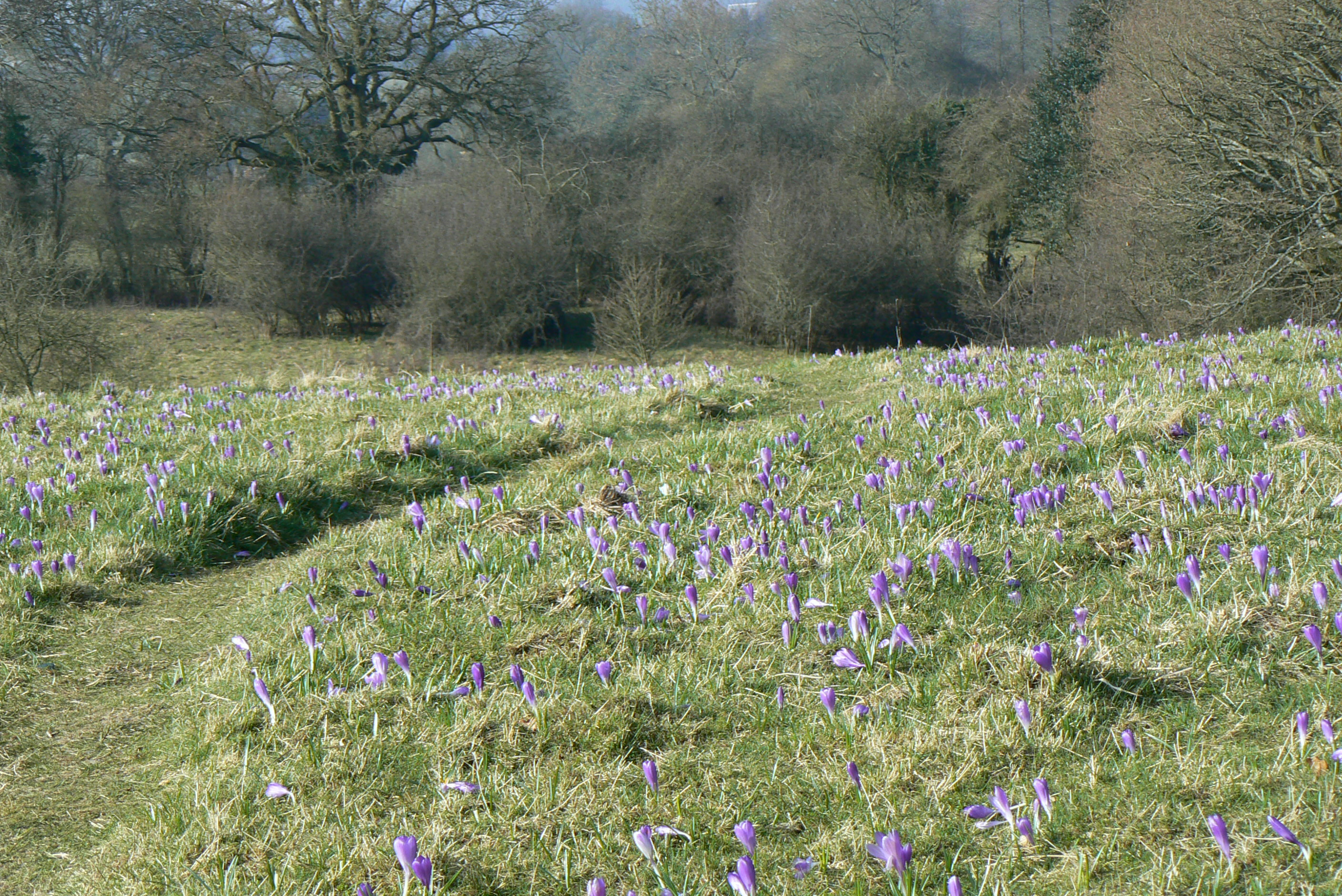
The Inkpen Crocus Field in Inkpen, England.

== Cultivars ==
- 'Flower Record' (Blue)
- 'Grand Maitre' (blue)
- 'Jeanne d'Arc' (Glistening white with an interior, dark purple base)
- 'Pickwick' (violet mauve, striped)
- 'Purpurea Grandiflora' (deep purple)
- 'Queen of Blues' (Ageratum-blue with paler margins and a dark base)
- 'Remembrance' (dark blue and purple)
- 'Silver Coral' (White, purple base)
- 'Vanguard' (silvery blue/violet, light purple)

== Synonyms ==
Several other spring blooming species, among others Crocus flavus Weston (Syn. Crocus aureus), have been called 'Crocus vernus' by other authors.

== Gallery ==
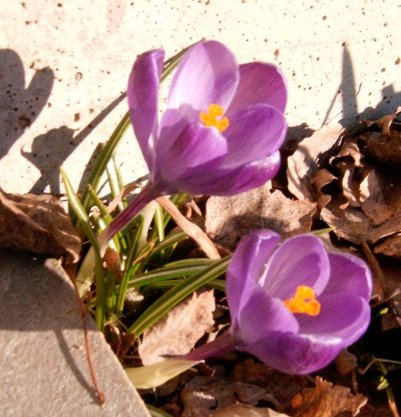
A Crocus vernus Cultivar

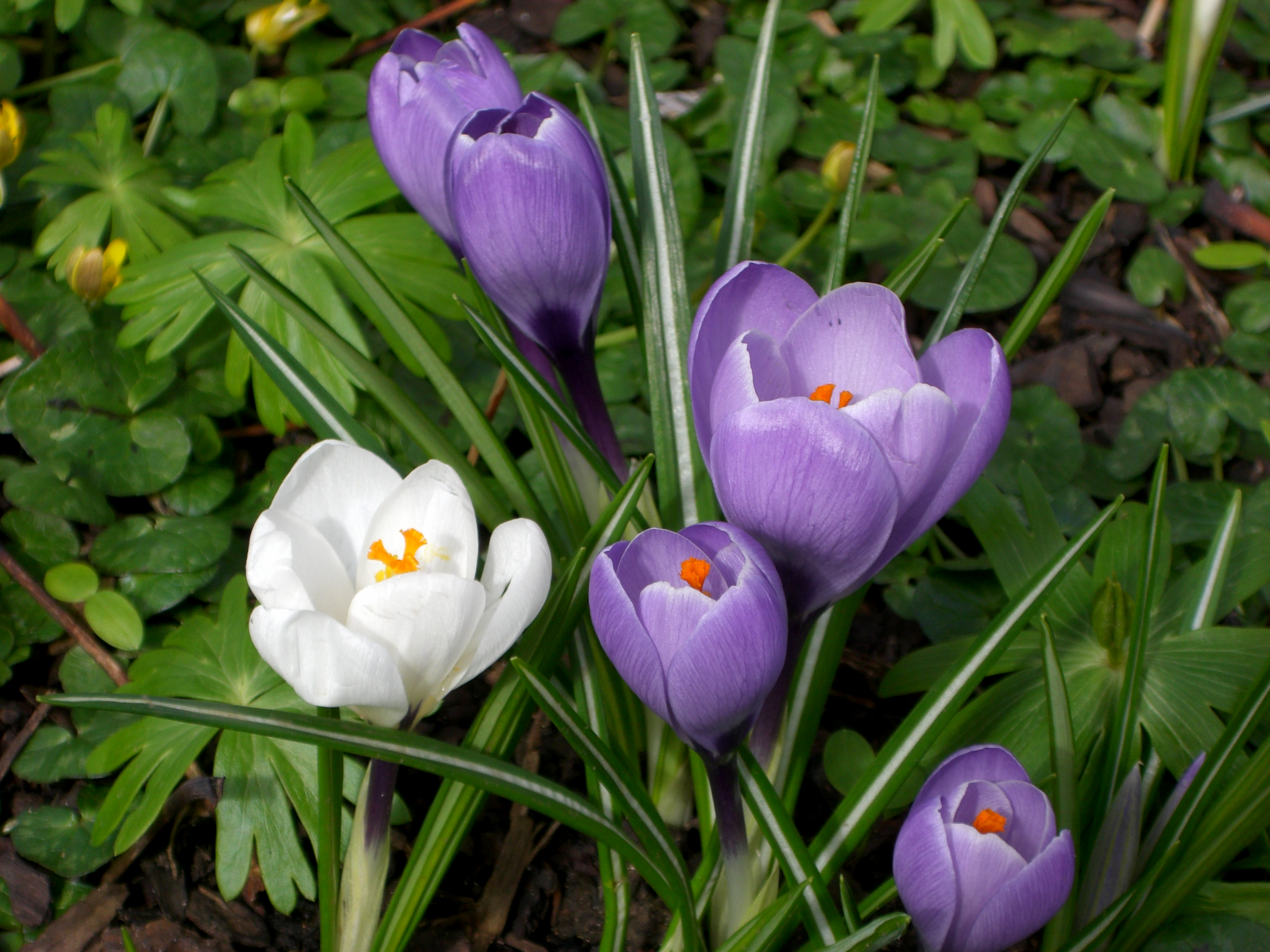
Purple and white Crocus vernus

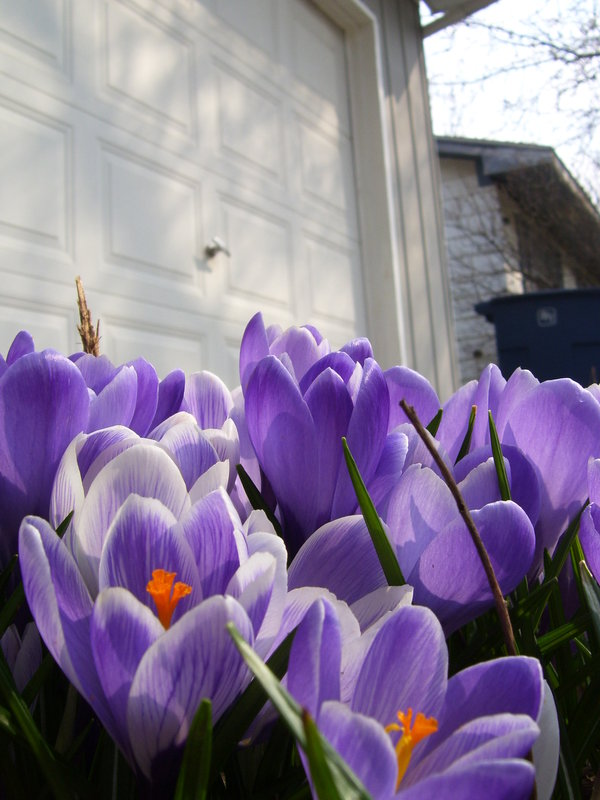

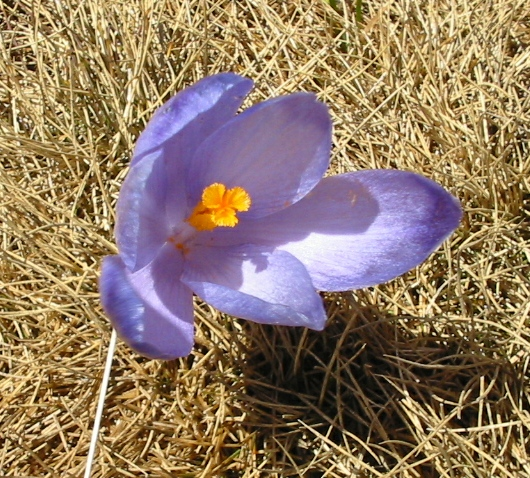
Close up of the flower.

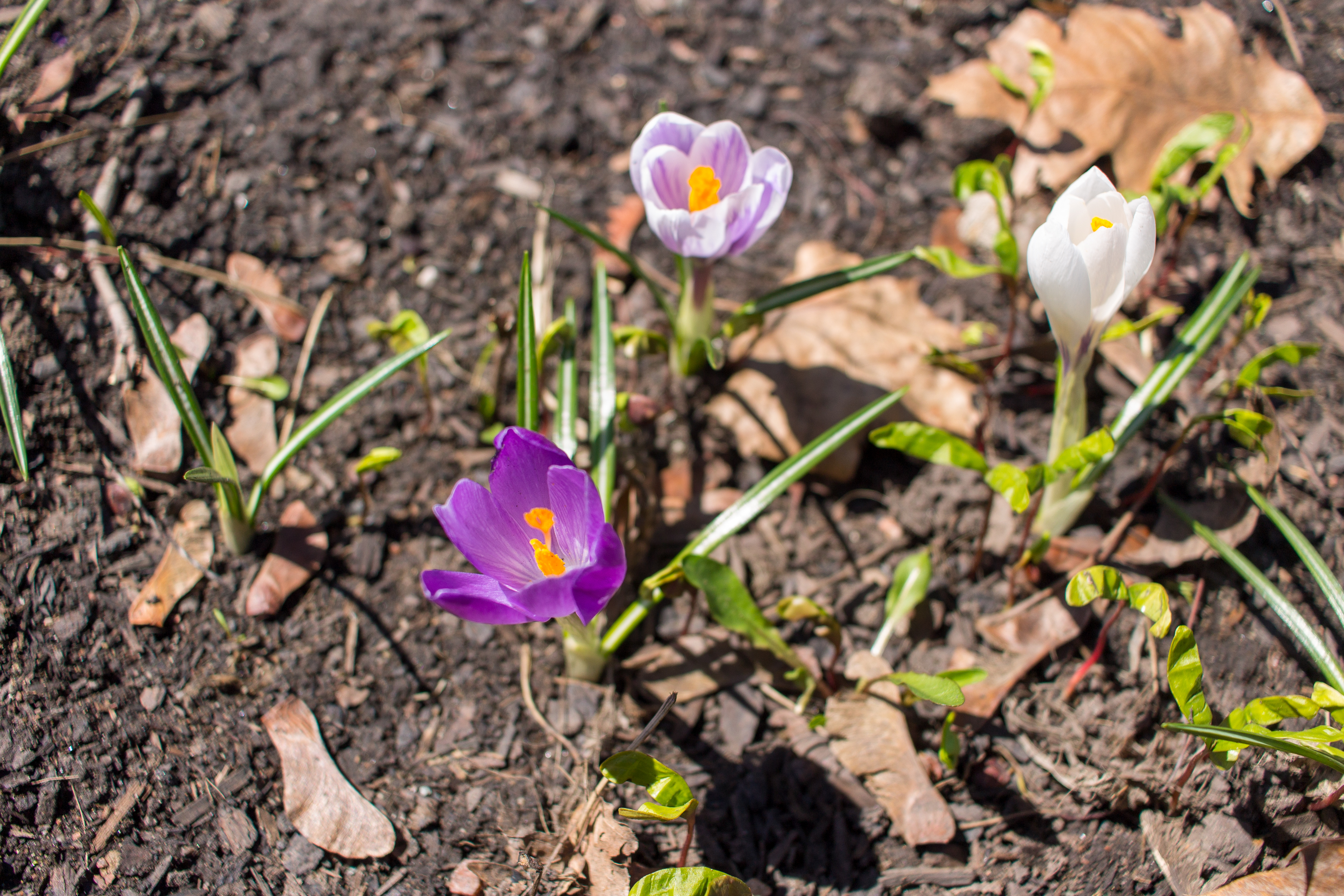
Purple and white crocus vernus.
