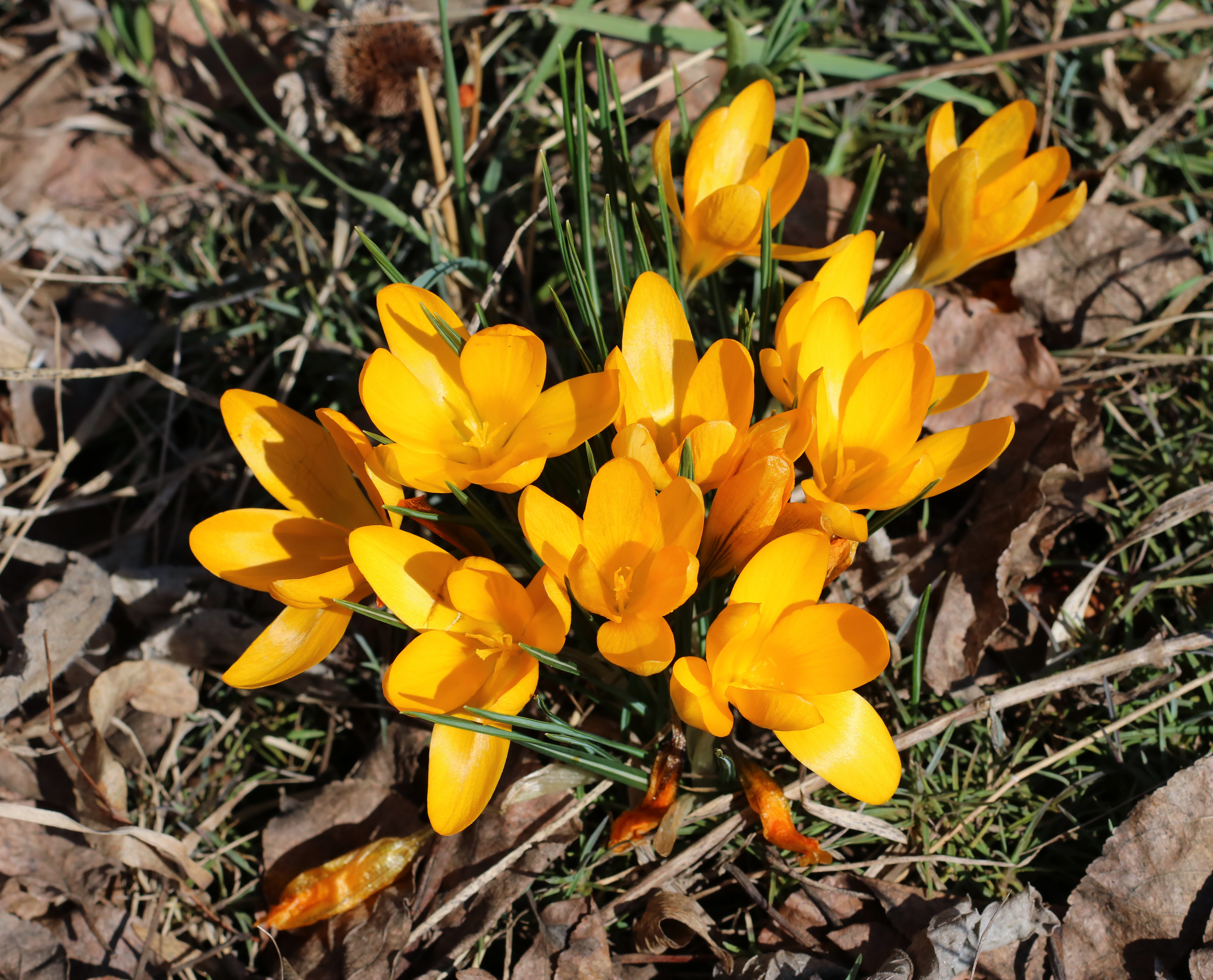

Scientific classification
- Kingdom: Plantae
- Clade: Tracheophytes
- Clade: Angiosperms
- Clade: Monocots
- Order: Asparagales
- Family: Iridaceae
- Genus: Crocus
- Species: C. flavus

Binomial name
- Crocus flavus Weston

Synonyms
- Crocus luteus Lam.; Crocus aureus Sm.

= Crocus flavus =

Species of flowering plant

Crocus flavus, known as yellow crocus, Dutch yellow crocus or snow crocus, is a species of flowering plant in the genus Crocus of the family Iridaceae. It grows wild on the slopes of Bulgaria, Greece, parts of former Yugoslavia (North Macedonia, Kosovo and Serbia), Romania and northwestern Turkey, with fragrant bright orange-yellow flowers. It is a small crocus (5–6 cm (2–2 in), despite the names of some cultivars, compared to the giant Dutch crocuses (C. vernus). Its cultivars are used as ornamental plants.

The Latin specific epithet flavus means "yellow".

== Description ==
Crocus flavus is a herbaceous perennial geophyte growing from a corm. The globe shaped corms are relatively large for a crocus species, and the tunics have parallel fibers. The chromosome count is 2N=8 with 11 B-chromosomes.

Subspecies

1. Crocus flavus subsp. dissectus T.Baytop & B.Mathew - western Turkey
2. Crocus flavus subsp. flavus - Bulgaria, Greece, Kosovo, North Macedonia, Romania, Serbia, Turkey; naturalized in Utah
3. Crocus flavus subsp. sarichinarensis Rukšans - Turkey

Crocus flavus subsp. flavus has gained the Royal Horticultural Society's Award of Garden Merit.

== Cultivation ==
Crocus flavus naturalizes well in gardens, and has escaped cultivation and become naturalized in the US state of Arkansas. The majority of plants grown in gardens are triploids that do not produce seeds and are propagated vegetatively. The species has been hybridized with other crocus species to produce a number of other cultivars.

Cultivars include Crocus flavus 'Grosser Gelber' ('Big Yellow'), with large orange-yellow flowers.

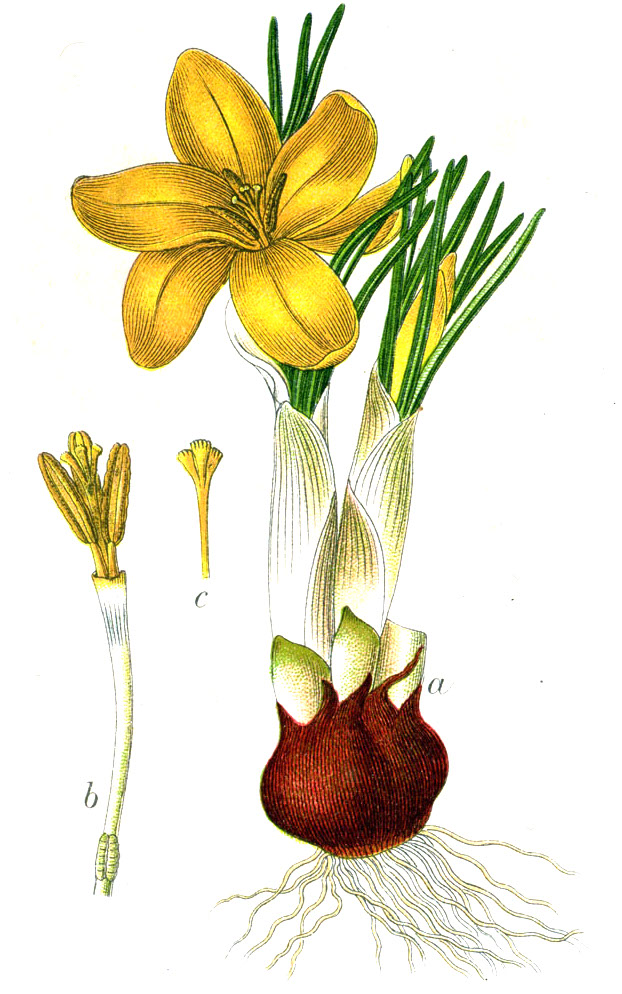
Illustration from Deutschlands Flora in Abbildungen

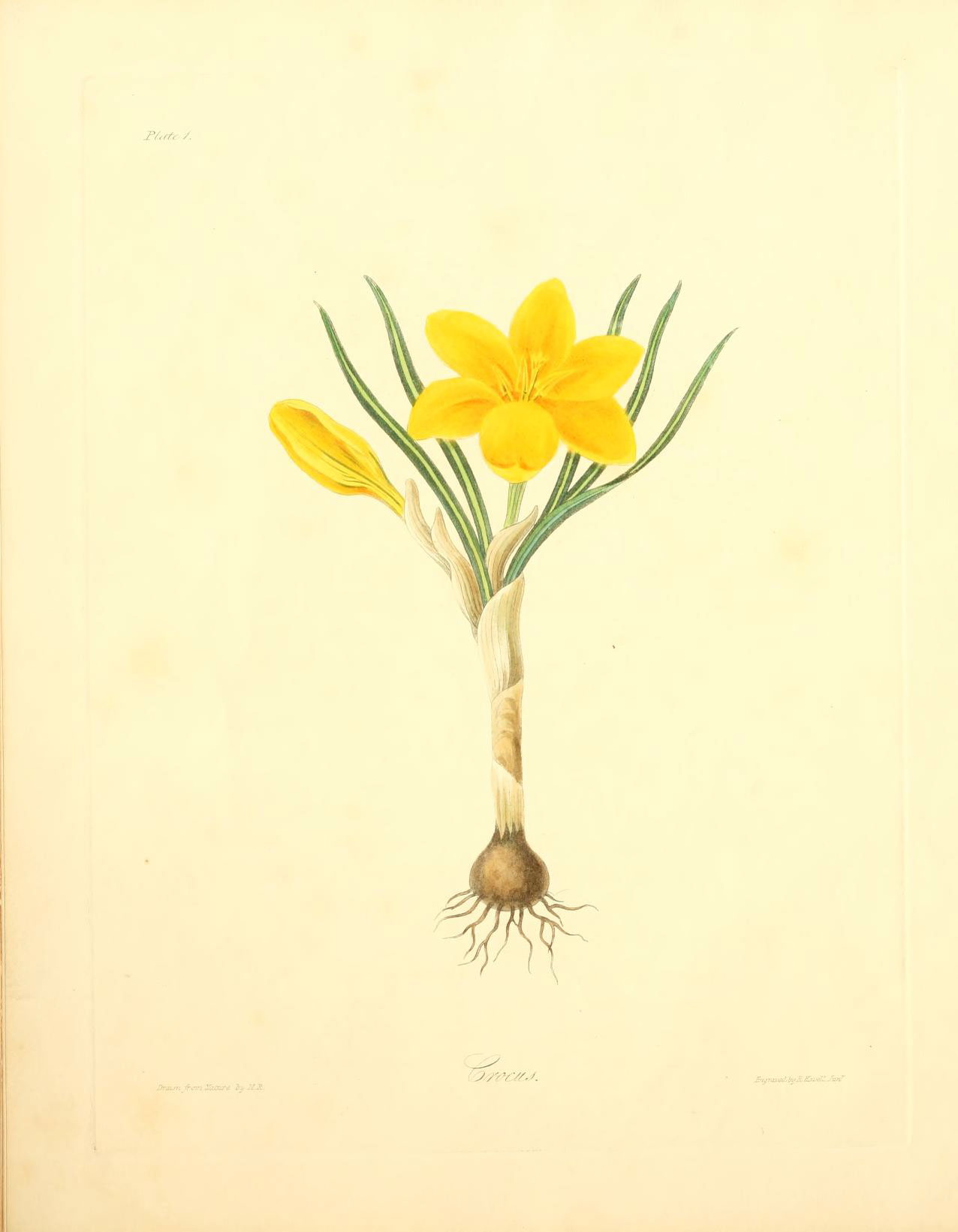
Illustration by Margaret Roscoe

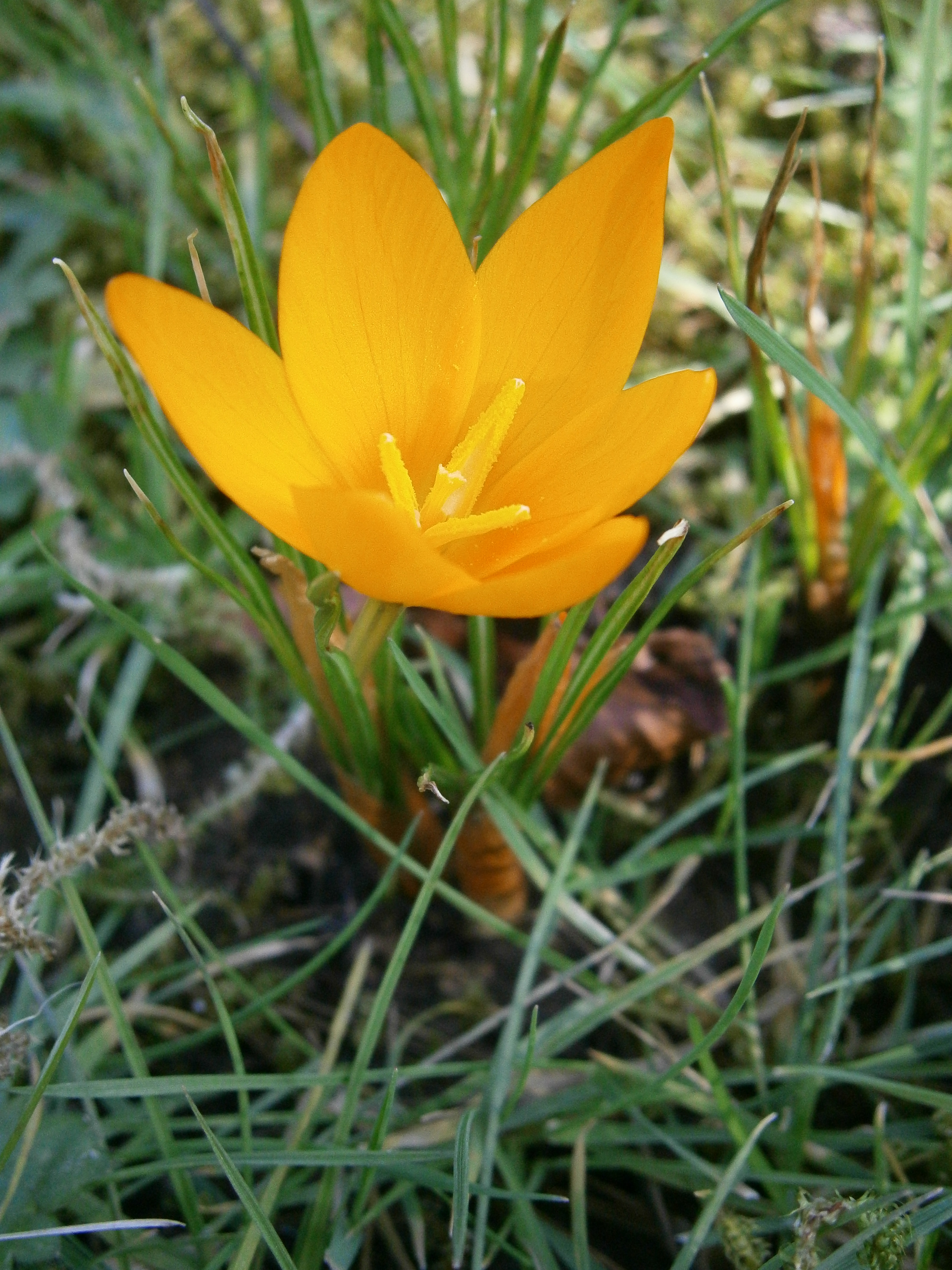
Crocus flavus subsp. flavus
