= Conrad Moench =

German botanist (1744–1805)

- Konrad Mönch
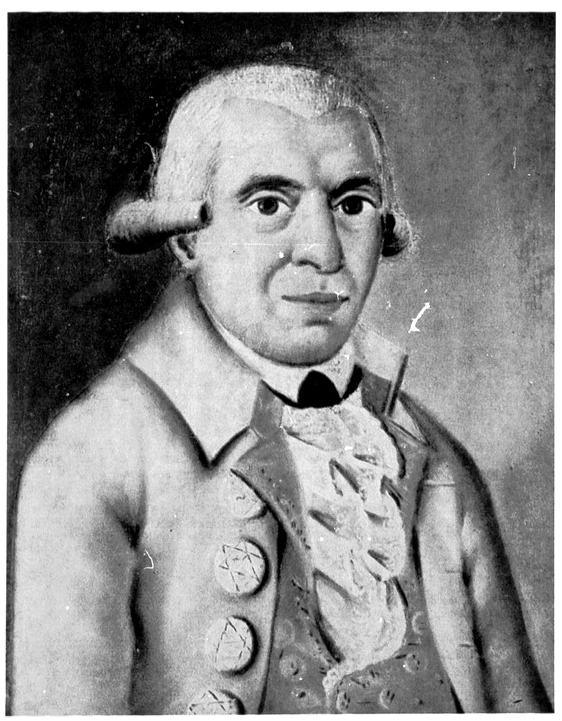
- 1800
- Born: 15 August 1744; Kassel
- Died: 6 January 1805 (aged 60); Marburg
- Citizenship: German
- Education: Doctorate in Medicine, 12 October 1781
- Alma mater: Marburg University
- Spouse: Catharine Margarethe Schmölder
- Scientific career
- Fields: botanist / pharmacist / chemist
- Institutions: Rats-Apotheke in Hanover, pharmacy of Samuel Wyttenbach in Bern, pharmacy in Kassel, assessor of Medizinalkollegs, professor of botany at the Collegium Carolinum, assessor of botany at Marburg University,
- Author abbrev. (botany): Moench

Conrad Moench (sometimes written Konrad Mönch; 15 August 1744 – 6 January 1805) was a German botanist, professor of botany at Marburg University from 1786 until his death.

He wrote Methodus Plantas horti botanici et agri Marburgensis; in 1794, an arranged account of plants in the fields and gardens of Marburg. Largely in this work, and in a supplement published in 1802, Moench published over 1,500 original scientific names of plants, including about 150 genera. The genera include Bergenia, Echinacea, Galactites, Kniphofia, Olearia, and Sorghum.

The botanical genus Moenchia (family Caryophyllaceae) is named in his honor.

The standard botanical author abbreviation Moench is applied to plants he described.

== Principal writings ==
- Enumeratio plantarum indigenarum Hassiae praesertim inferioris, secundum methodum sexualem dispositarum, 1777.
- Moench, Conrad (1794). Methodus plantas horti botanici et agri Marburgensis: a staminum situ describendi (in Latin). Marburg: Marburgi cattorum: in officina nova libraria academiae. (published in several editions)
- Systematische Lehre von denen gebräuchlichsten Einfachen und zusammengesezten Arzney-Mitteln : zum Gebrauch Akademischer Vorlesungen, 1795 – Systematic teaching of simple and compound medicines; academic lectures.
- Einleitung zur Pflanzen-Kunde, 1798 – Introduction to botany.

== Sources ==
- Johnson M. The Genus Clematis pp 89-90, 2001.
- Monroe WR. Analysis of the rhizome of Aralia californica. American Journal of Pharmacy volume 70 number 10, October 1898.

== External Sources ==
- Works by or about Conrad Moench at Wikisource
