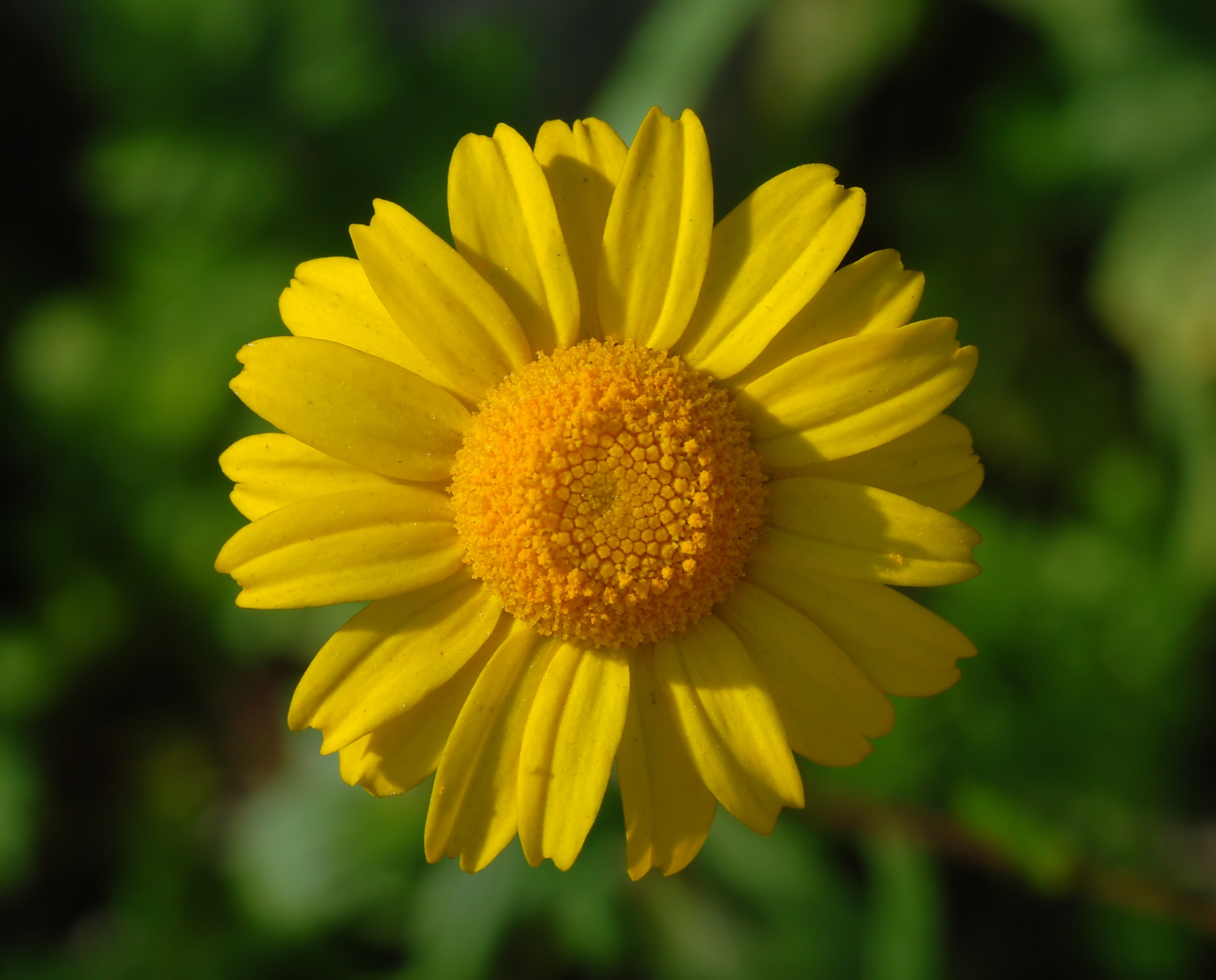
- Coleostephus myconis

Scientific classification
- Kingdom: Plantae
- Clade: Tracheophytes
- Clade: Angiosperms
- Clade: Eudicots
- Clade: Asterids
- Order: Asterales
- Family: Asteraceae
- Subfamily: Asteroideae
- Tribe: Anthemideae
- Genus: Coleostephus; Cass.

Type species
- Coleostephus myconis (L.) Rchb. f.

Synonyms
- Myconella Sprague; Myconia Sch.Bip. (1844), NOT Myconia Lapeyr. (1813); Kremeria Durieu; Chrysanthemum sect. Coleostephus (Cass.) Boiss.

= Coleostephus =

Genus of flowering plants

Coleostephus is a genus of flowering plants in the family Asteraceae (daisy family).

Species

- Coleostephus multicaulis (Desf.) Durieu - Algeria
- Coleostephus myconis (L.) Cass. - Spain, Portugal, France, Corsica, Sardinia, Italy, Yugoslavia, Greece, Algeria, Morocco
- Coleostephus paludosus (Durieu) Alavi - Spain, Portugal, Corsica, Sardinia, Italy, Sicily, Algeria, Tunisia, Libya
