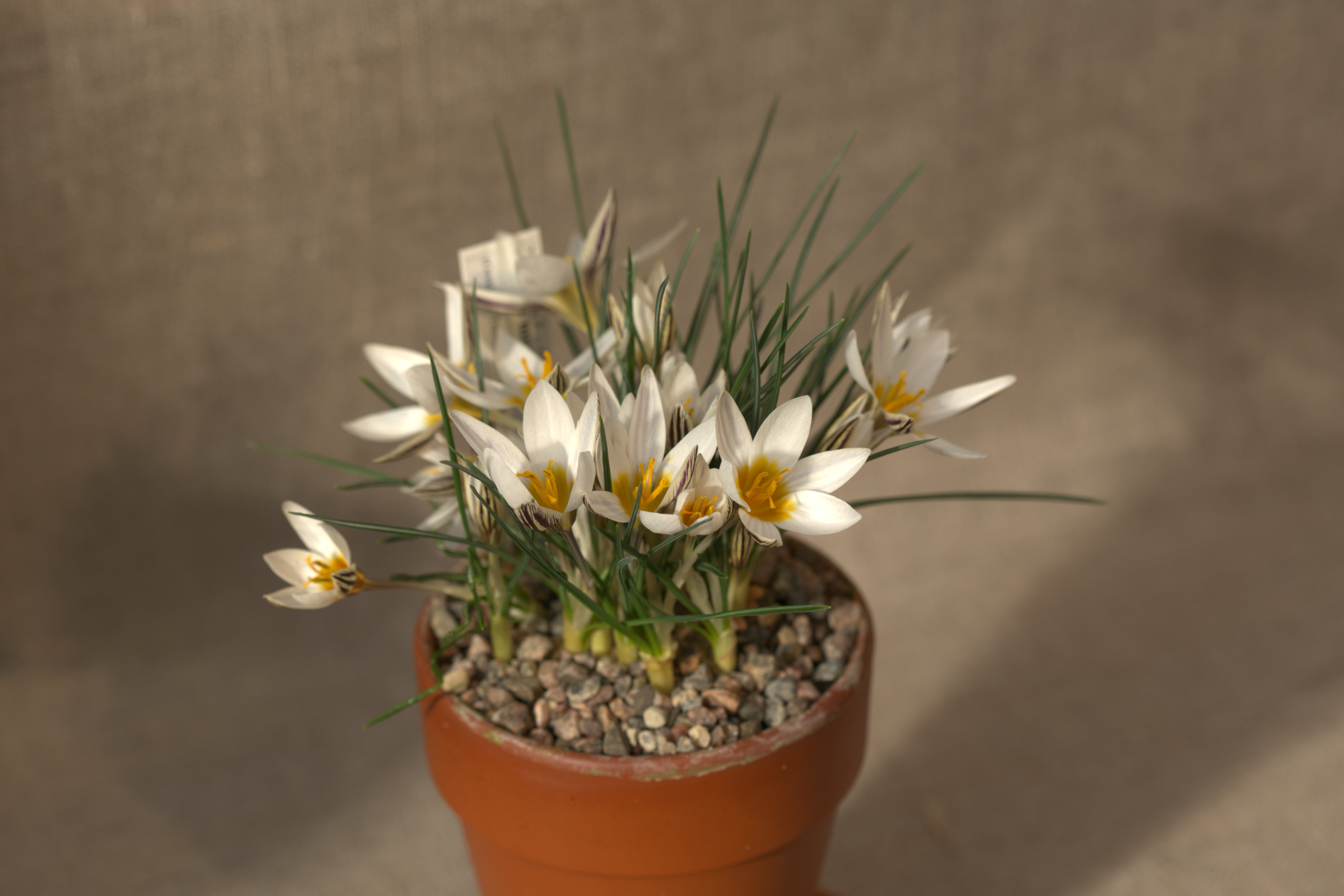
- Crocus biflorus subsp. stridii at a Crocus exhibition in the greenhouses at Gothenburg Botanical Garden, spring 2016

Scientific classification
- Kingdom: Plantae
- Clade: Tracheophytes
- Clade: Angiosperms
- Clade: Monocots
- Order: Asparagales
- Family: Iridaceae
- Genus: Crocus
- Species: C. biflorus
- Subspecies: C. b. subsp. stridii

Trinomial name
- Crocus biflorus subsp. stridii (Papan. & Zacharof) B.Mathew

= Crocus biflorus subsp. stridii =

Subspecies of flowering plant

Crocus biflorus subsp. stridii is a subspecies of flowering plant in the genus Crocus of the family Iridaceae, found in the northeastern Greece and particular in Xanthi and Thessaloniki.
