= Damned yellow composite =

Group of flowers

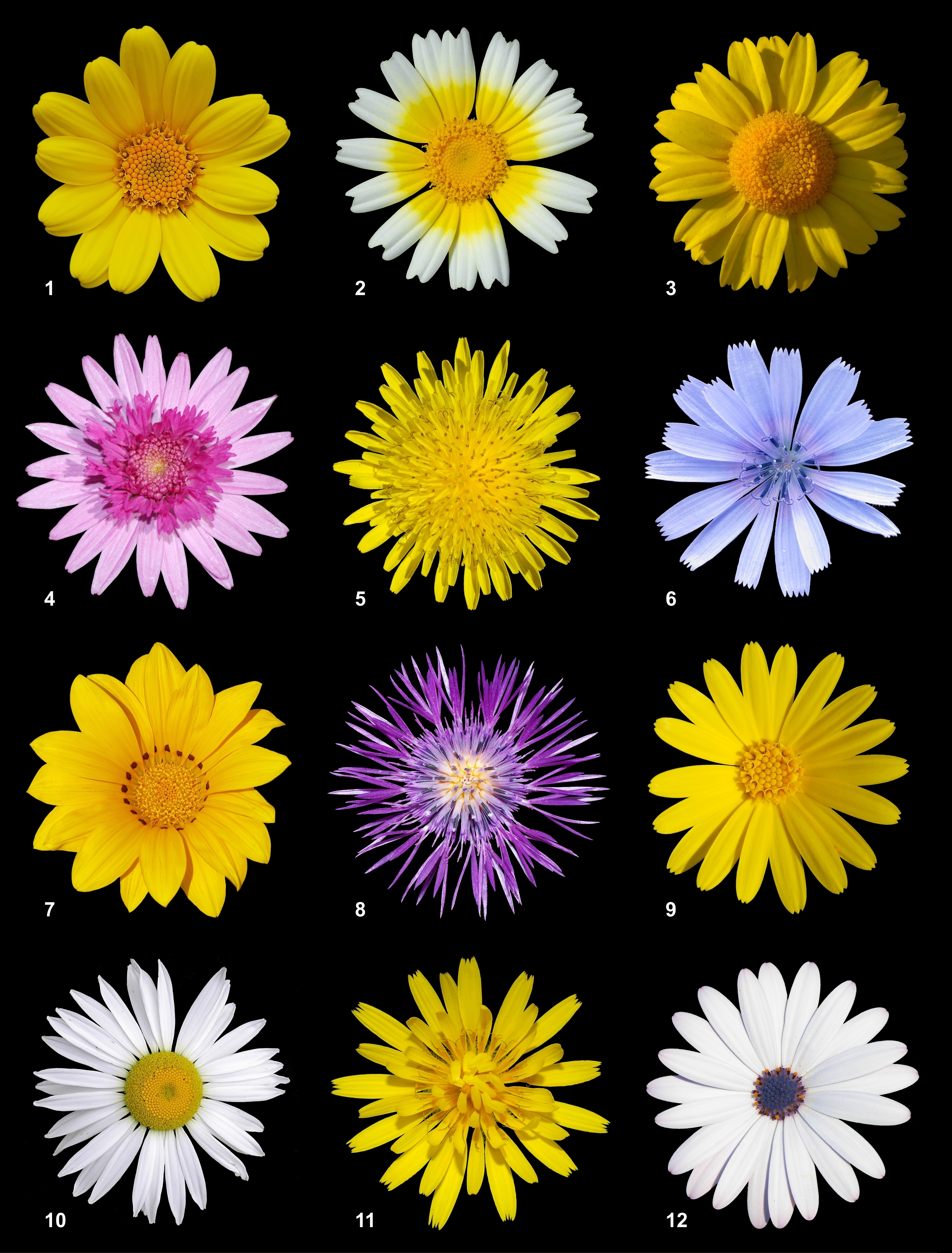
Flowers from twelve species of the family Asteraceae: 1. Yellow chamomile 2. Garland chrysanthemum 3. Coleostephus myconis 4. Garden marguerite 5. Sow thistle 6. Chicory 7. Treasure flower 8. Purple milk thistle 9. Field marigold 10. Ox-eye daisy 11. Common hawkweed 12. Cape daisy

A damned or damn yellow composite (DYC) is any of the numerous species of composite flowers (family Asteraceae) that have yellow flowers and can be difficult to tell apart in the field. It is a jocular term, and sometimes reserved for those yellow composites of little particular interest. Notable individuals who referred to these flowers as "DYCs" include Oliver Sacks and Lady Bird Johnson. The U.S. National Park Service provides information to help visitors identify "Darn Yellow Composites".

== See also ==
- Little brown bird
- Little brown mushroom
