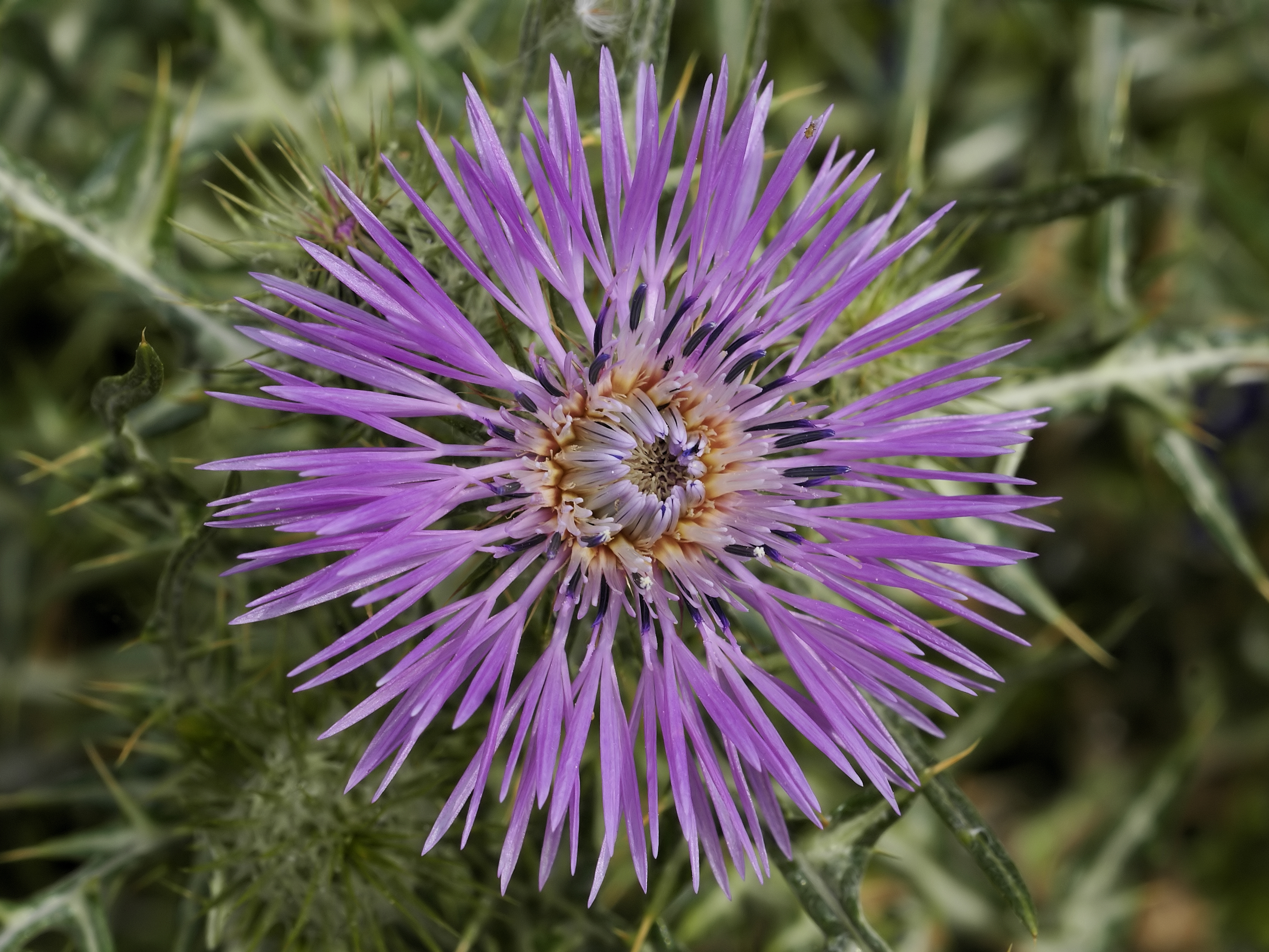
- Galactites tomentosus

Scientific classification
- Kingdom: Plantae
- Clade: Tracheophytes
- Clade: Angiosperms
- Clade: Eudicots
- Clade: Asterids
- Order: Asterales
- Family: Asteraceae
- Subfamily: Carduoideae
- Tribe: Cardueae
- Subtribe: Carduinae
- Genus: Galactites; Moench

Type species
- Galactites tomentosus Moench

Synonyms
- Lupsia Neck. ex Neck.

= Galactites =

Genus of flowering plants

Galactites is a genus of flowering plants in the family Asteraceae. The name is derived from the Greek γάλα (= "milk"). The best-known species is Galactites tomentosus.

== Species ==
- Galactites duriaei Spach ex Durieu - Spain, France, Channel Islands (UK), Monaco, Andorra, Gibraltar, Algeria, Morocco
- Galactites mutabilis Durieu - Algeria, Tunisia
- Galactites rigualii Figuerola, Stübing & Peris - Spain
- Galactites tomentosus Moench (sometimes spelled tomentosa but see Tropicos) - Spain, France, Italy, Greece, Albania, Montenegro, Malta, Algeria, Tunisia, Morocco, Azores, Canary Islands, Madeira
