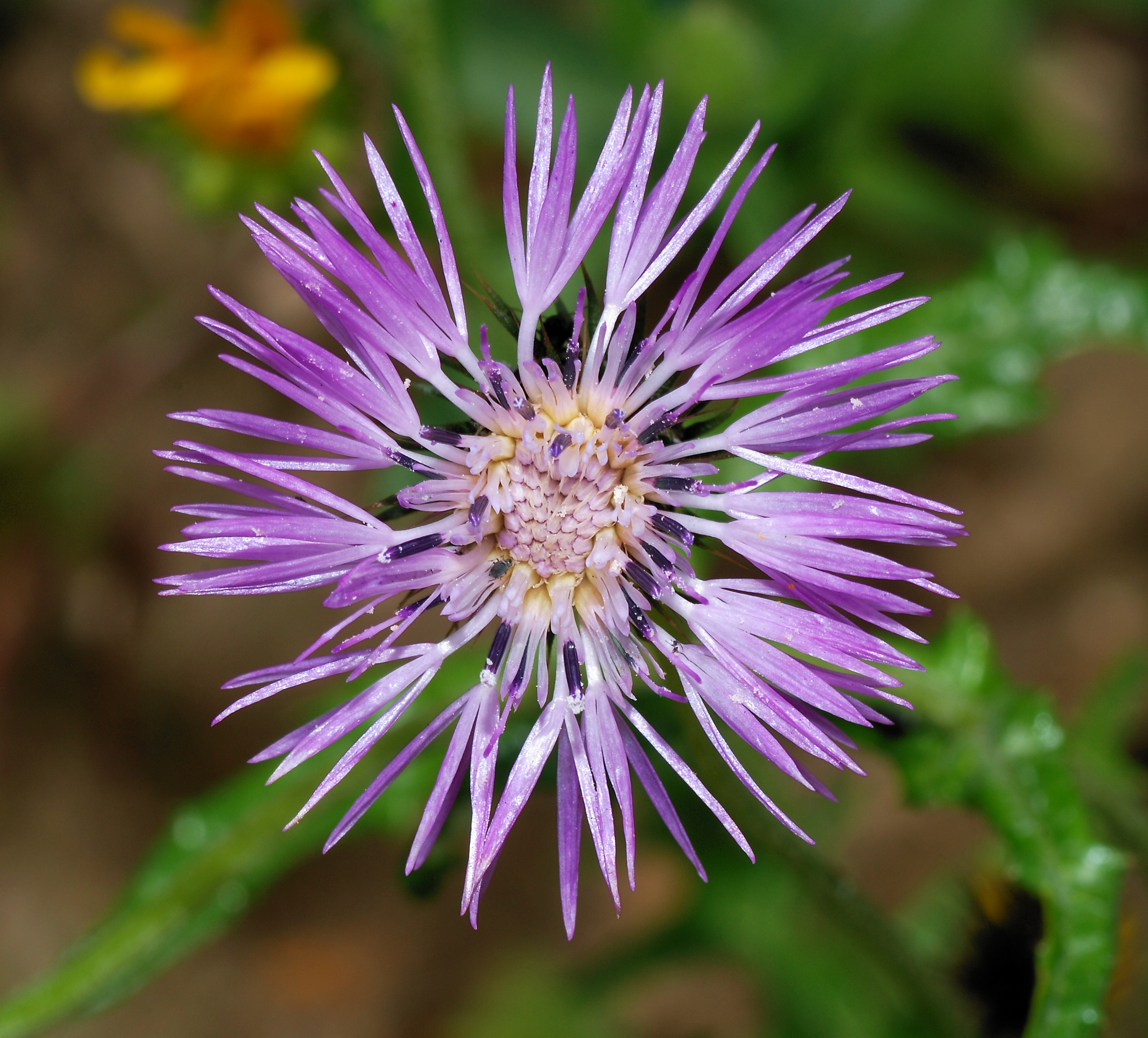

Scientific classification
- Kingdom: Plantae
- Clade: Tracheophytes
- Clade: Angiosperms
- Clade: Eudicots
- Clade: Asterids
- Order: Asterales
- Family: Asteraceae
- Genus: Galactites
- Species: G. tomentosus

Binomial name
- Galactites tomentosus Moench

Synonyms
- Galactites pumila Porta; Carduus galactites (L.) Chaub.; Lupsia galactites (L.) Kuntze; Galactites elegans (All.) Nyman ex Soldano

= Galactites tomentosus =

Species of flowering plant

Galactites tomentosus, the purple milk thistle, is a biennial herbaceous plant belonging to the genus Galactites of the Asteraceae family.

== Description ==
Galactites tomentosus is a hemicryptophyte plant up to 1 metre (3 ft 3 in) tall. The stem is erect and pubescent, branched at the top. The leaves are green, long and pinnatisect, lanceolate, mottled with white markings, while the underside is whitish and covered with matted woolly hairs. The margins of the leaves bear strong thorns.

The flower heads are quite large – about 3 centimetres (1.2 in) in diameter. The involucre of the flower head is covered by hairy scales ending with a single grooved thorn. The central flowers are hermaphrodite and are pollinated by insects, while external flowers are sterile; their color varies from white or pink to lilac-purple.

The flowering period extends from April through July and the seeds ripen from August through September. The fruits are achenes with whitish hairy appendages (pappus).

== Etymology ==
The genus name derives from the Greek γάλα (= "milk"), referring to the dense white hairs covering the stems and leaves of this species, the species name tomentosus means hairy in Latin.

== Distribution ==
This plant is distributed around the Mediterranean Basin, from Greece to the Iberian Peninsula, Morocco and Madeira and Canary Islands. It has been introduced to the Azores.

== Habitat ==
This plant prefers sunny places and usually grows on the uncultivated or barren grounds, waste places, well-drained soils, pastures and roadsides.

== Uses ==
It is an edible plant.

== Gallery ==
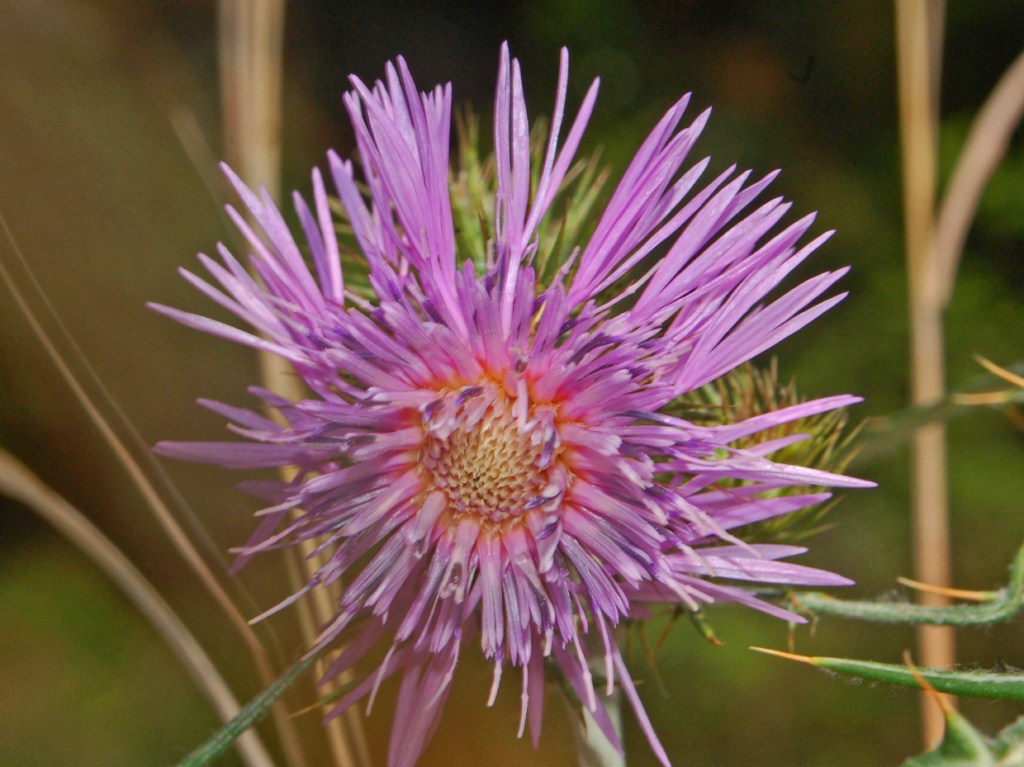
Flowerhead of Galactites tomentosus

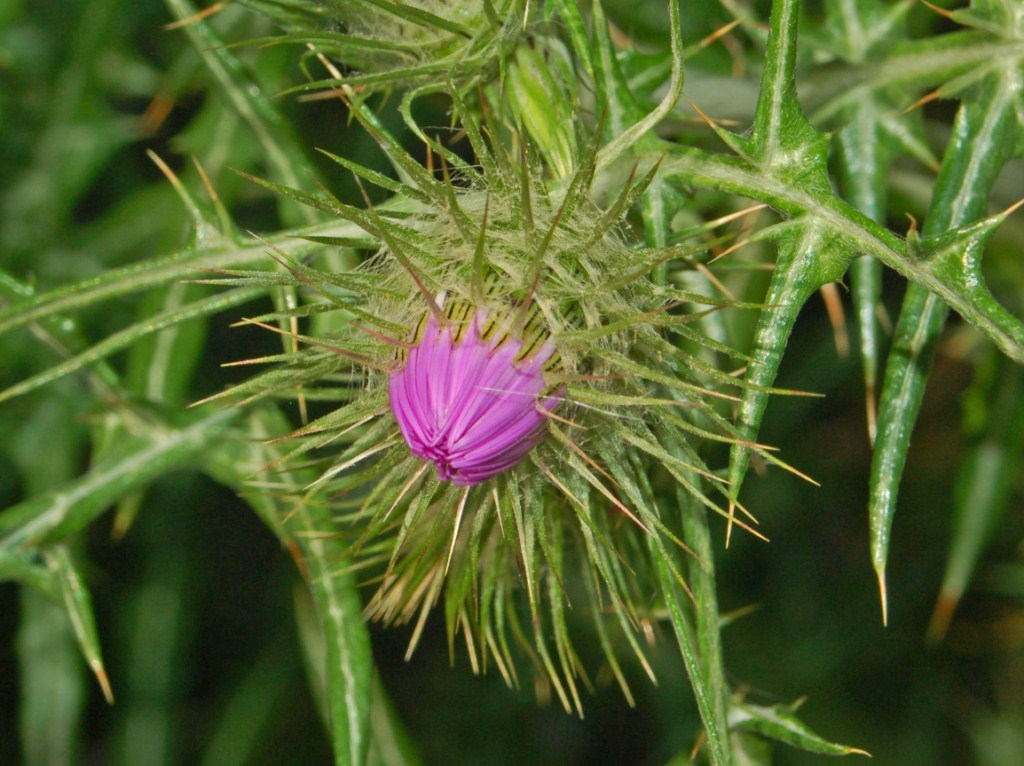
Bud of Galactites tomentosus

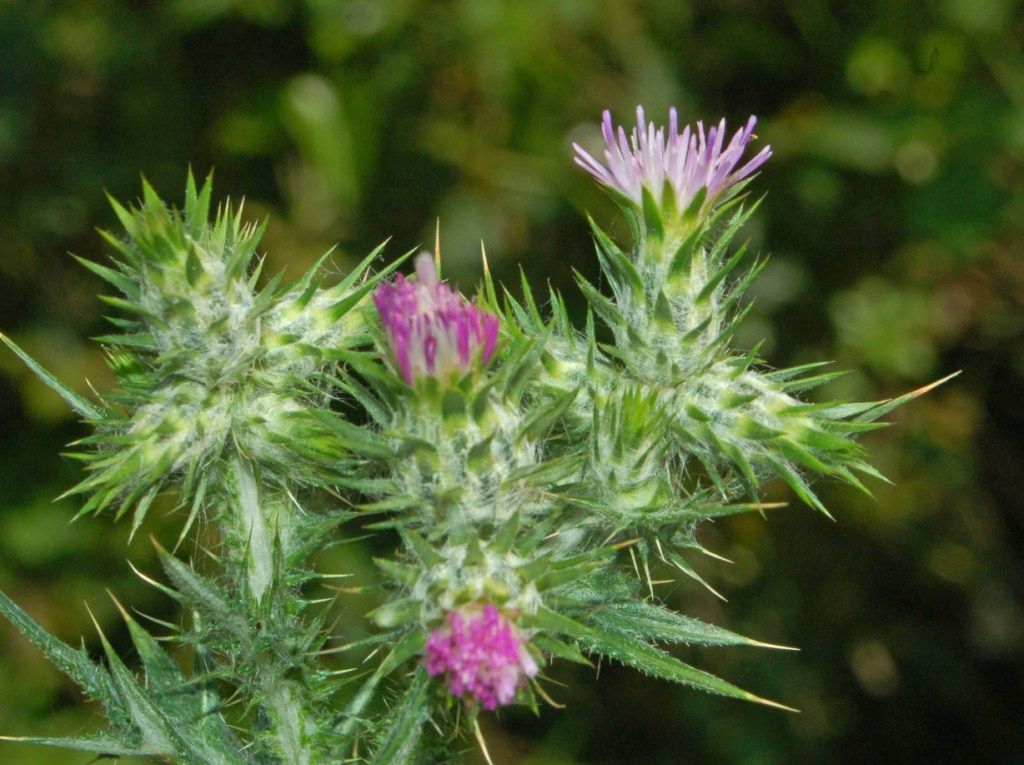
Flowerheads of Galactites tomentosus

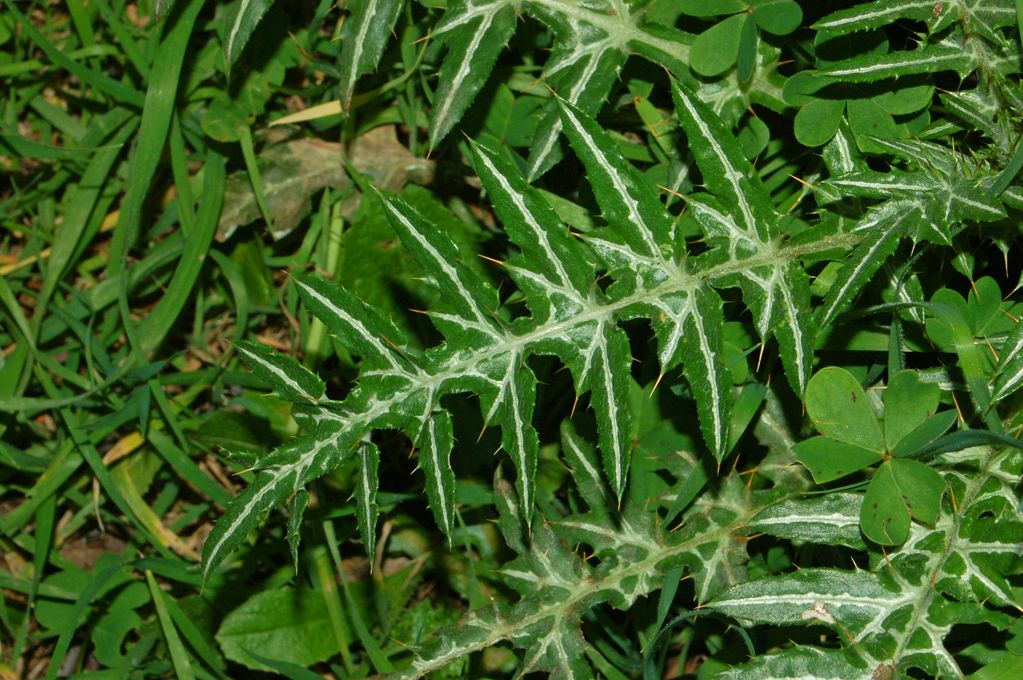
Leaf of Galactites tomentosus

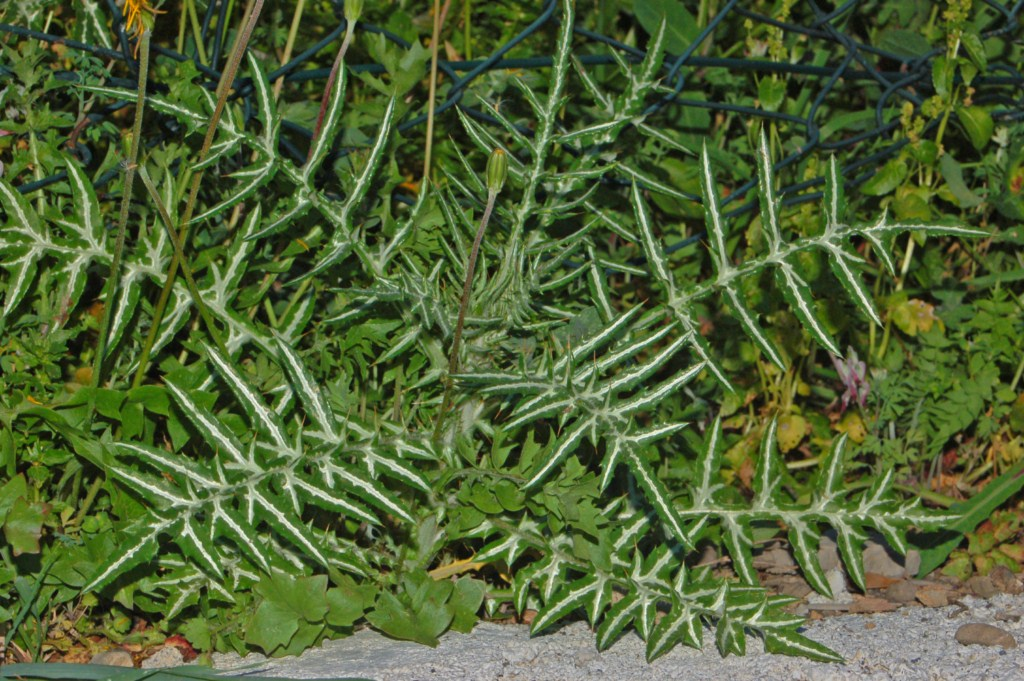
Plant of Galactites tomentosus
