= Little brown bird =

Informal name used by birdwatchers

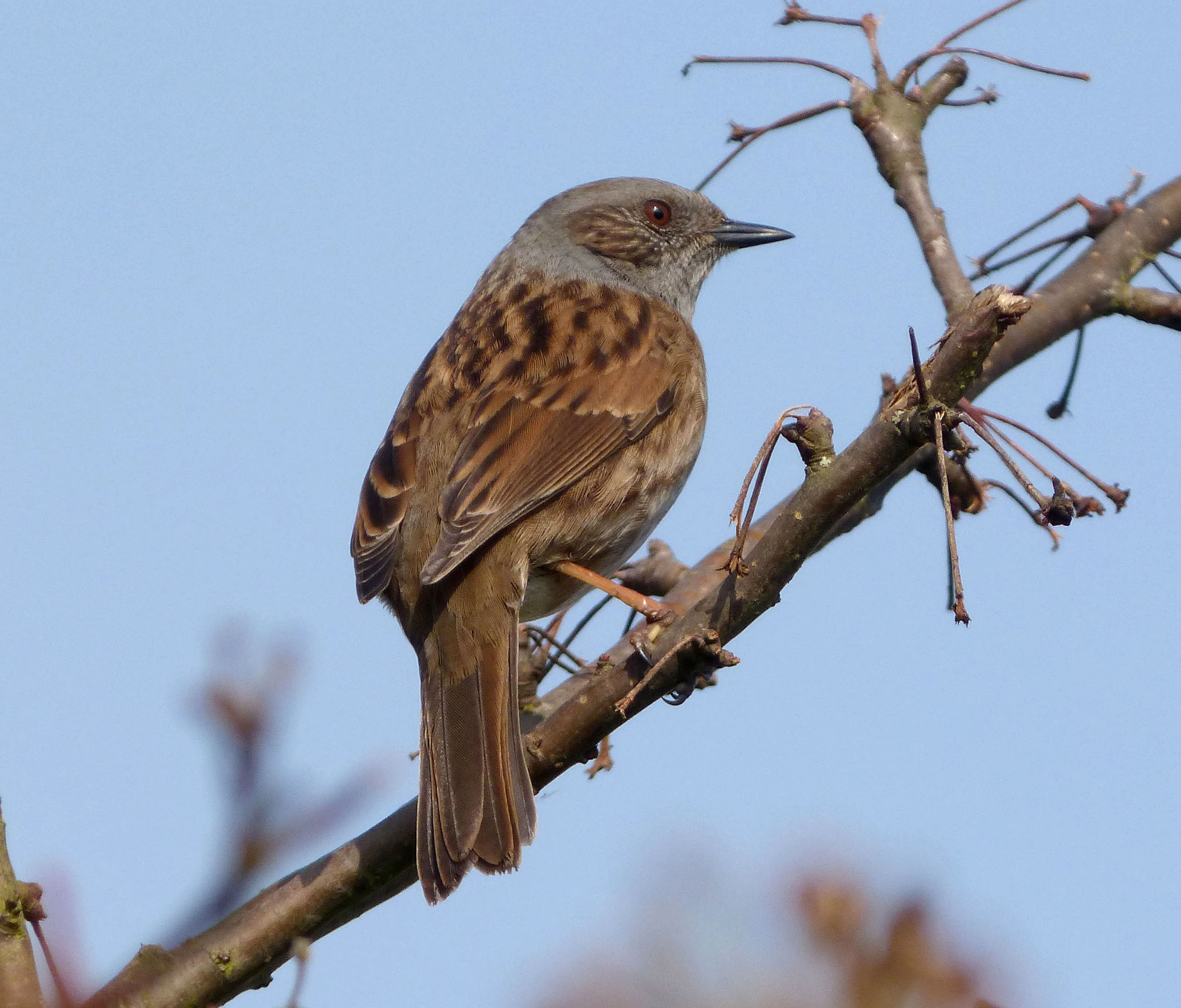
The dunnock is the archetypal little brown bird: its name actually means 'little brown bird', from Old English dun, brown, and ock diminutive for a bird.

Little brown bird (LBB) or little brown job (LBJ) is an informal name used by birdwatchers for any of the large number of species of small brown passerine birds, many of which are notoriously difficult to distinguish. This is especially true for females of species which show sexual dimorphism, which may lack much of the differentiating colouring present in males.

The name little brown bat is also applied to records in general observations of microchiroptera species, many of which are indistinguishable by their greyish-brown fur and similar structure.

== See also ==
- Damned yellow composite, a similar term for the numerous difficult-to-identify dandelion-like plants
- Little brown mushroom, a similar term for difficult-to-identify mushrooms
- Minibeast
- Small shelly fauna
