= Crocus aerius =

Conservation status
- Endangered (IUCN 3.1)

Scientific classification
- Kingdom: Plantae
- Clade: Tracheophytes
- Clade: Angiosperms
- Clade: Monocots
- Order: Asparagales
- Family: Iridaceae
- Genus: Crocus
- Species: C. aerius

Binomial name
- Crocus aerius Herb.

Synonyms
- Crocus aerius var. pulchricolor Herb.; Crocus aerius var. stauricus Herb.; Crocus biliottii Maw

Species of flowering plant

Crocus aerius is a species of flowering plant in the family Iridaceae. It is a cormous perennial native to Turkey.

Commonly found in the Pontus Mountains growing in grassy areas and those with a lot of stones at an elevation of 2000 meters, flowering occurs in May.

The glaucous leaves are curved and more firm than typical Crocus foliage.
