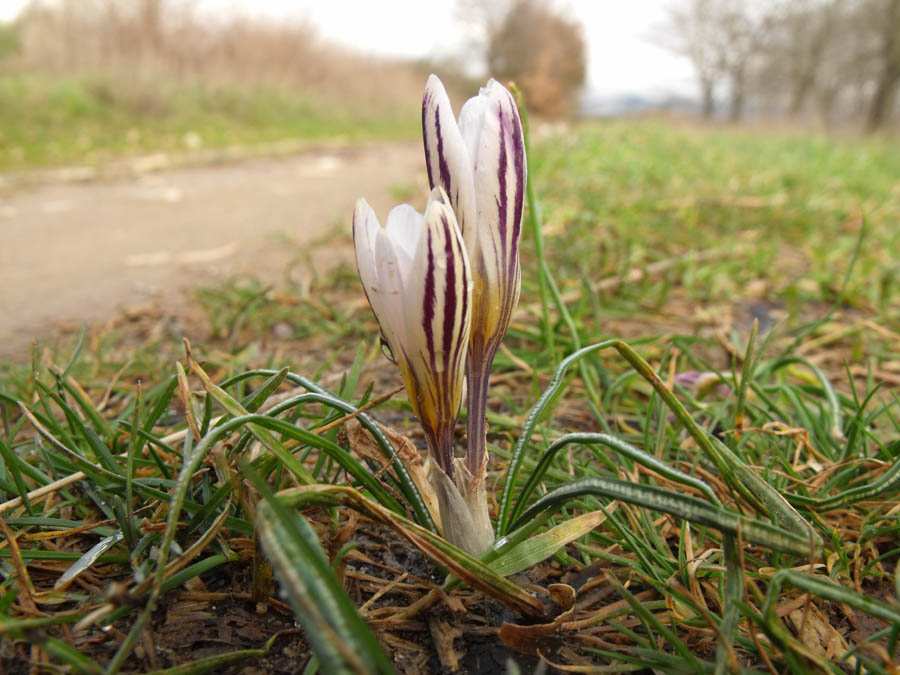
- In Tuscany

Scientific classification
- Kingdom: Plantae
- Clade: Tracheophytes
- Clade: Angiosperms
- Clade: Monocots
- Order: Asparagales
- Family: Iridaceae
- Genus: Crocus
- Species: C. biflorus

Binomial name
- Crocus biflorus Mill.

= Crocus biflorus =

Species of flowering plant

Crocus biflorus, the silvery crocus or scotch crocus, is a species of flowering plant in the family Iridaceae. It is native to south-eastern Europe and south-western Asia, including Italy, the Balkans, Ukraine, Turkey, Caucasus, Iraq, and Iran. It is a cormous perennial growing to 6 cm (2.4 in) tall and wide. It is a highly variable species, with flowers in shades of pale mauve or white, often with darker stripes on the outer tepals. The flowers appear early in spring.

== Description ==
Crocus biflorus is a herbaceous perennial geophyte growing from a corm. The corm is globe-shaped with flattened ends, covered with a smooth tunic that has two or three rings. The white-lilac flowers with yellow throats have purple-blue striped outer surfaces. Each blooming corm typical produces two flowers, thus the species epithet "biflorus".

== Classification ==
According to the taxonomic classification proposed by Brian Mathew in 1982, C. biflorus falls within the series Biflori of the section Nudiscapus within the genus Crocus. However, modern DNA analysis is challenging whether the series Biflori can be separated from the Reticulati and Speciosi series. At least 21 subspecies of C. biflorus have been named; furthermore numerous cultivars have been raised for garden use.

Subspecies

- Crocus biflorus subsp. adamii (J.Gay) K.Richt. - Balkans, Ukraine, Crimea, Caucasus, Iran
- Crocus biflorus subsp. albocoronatus Kerndorff - Taurus Mountains in Turkey
- Crocus biflorus subsp. artvinensis (J.Philippow) B.Mathew - Caucasus, northeastern Turkey
- Crocus biflorus subsp. atrospermus Kernd. & Pasche - Turkey
- Crocus biflorus subsp. biflorus - Italy including Sicily, Turkey, Rodhos (Ρόδος, Rhodes) Island in Greece
- Crocus biflorus subsp. caelestis Kernd. & Pasche - Turkey
- Crocus biflorus subsp. caricus Kernd. & Pasche - Turkey
- Crocus biflorus subsp. crewei (Hook.f.) B.Mathew - Turkey, Greek islands
- Crocus biflorus subsp. fibroannulatus Kernd. & Pasche - Artvin Province in Turkey
- Crocus biflorus subsp. ionopharynx Kernd. & Pasche - Turkey
- Crocus biflorus subsp. isauricus (Siehe ex Bowles) B.Mathew - Turkey
- Crocus biflorus subsp. leucostylosus Kernd. & Pasche - Denizli Province in Turkey
- Crocus biflorus subsp. nubigena (Herb.) B.Mathew - Turkey and Greek islands in the Aegean. Found growing in evergreen oak scrub and pine forests from 100 to 1000 meters; blooming in November to March.
- Crocus biflorus subsp. pseudonubigena B.Mathew - Turkey
- Crocus biflorus subsp. pulchricolor (Herb.) B.Mathew - Turkey
- Crocus biflorus subsp. punctatus B.Mathew - Turkey
- Crocus biflorus subsp. stridii (Papan. & Zacharof) B.Mathew - northeastern Greece
- Crocus biflorus subsp. tauri (Maw) B.Mathew - Caucasus, Turkey, Iran, Iraq. Found growing in damp woods, on open hillside with dry soils, and in alpine turf up to 3000 meters in elevation. Flowering from January to May.
- Crocus biflorus subsp. weldenii (Hoppe & Fürnr.) K.Richt - Italy, Albania, Yugoslavia. Found growing around 1000 meters in rocky woods, commonly on limestone.
- Crocus biflorus subsp. yataganensis Kernd. & Pasche - Turkey

== Award ==
The cultivar 'Blue Pearl' has gained the Royal Horticultural Society's Award of Garden Merit.
