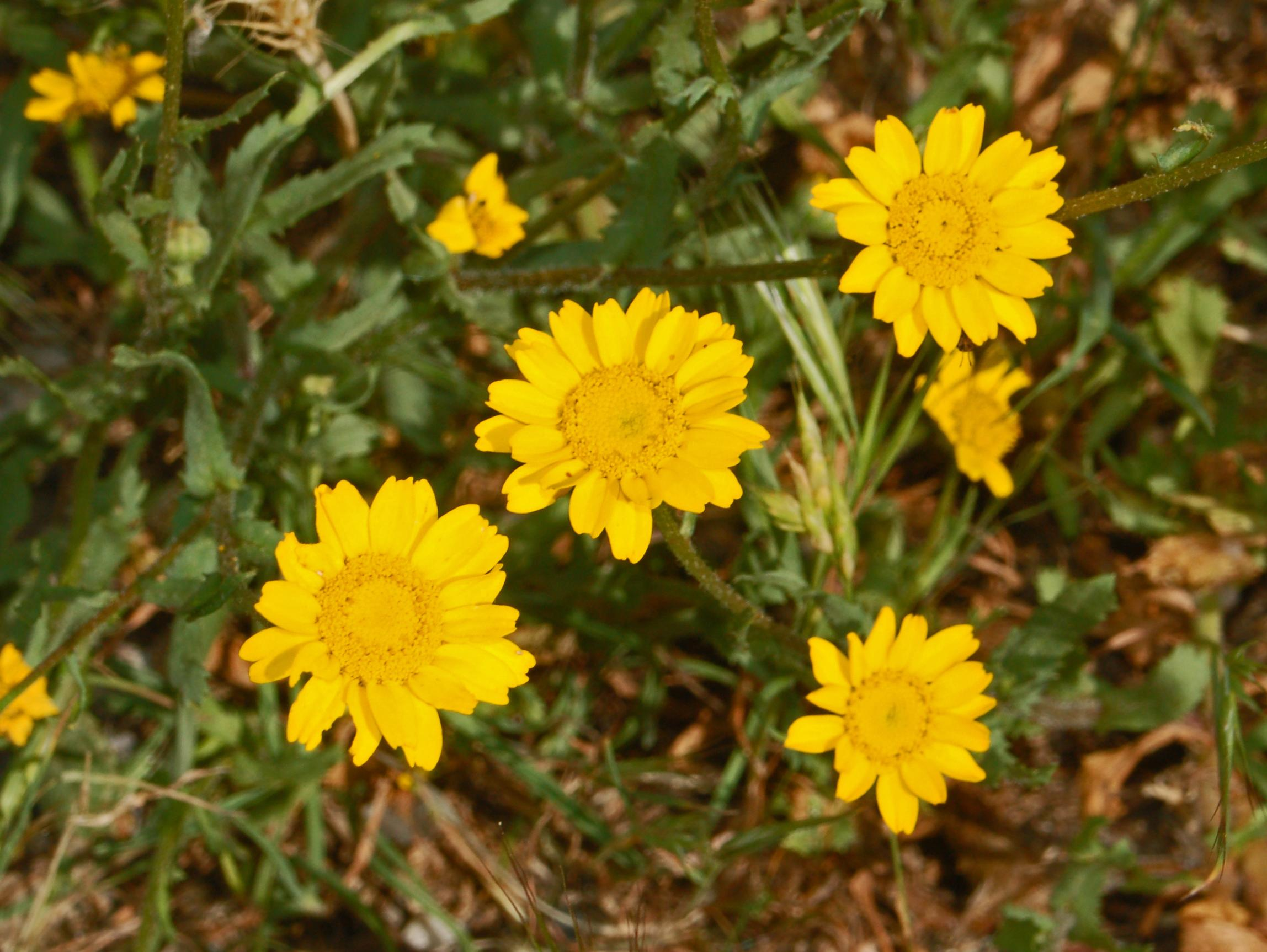

Scientific classification
- Kingdom: Plantae
- Clade: Tracheophytes
- Clade: Angiosperms
- Clade: Eudicots
- Clade: Asterids
- Order: Asterales
- Family: Asteraceae
- Genus: Coleostephus
- Species: C. myconis

Binomial name
- Coleostephus myconis (L.) Rchb.f.

Synonyms
- Chrysanthemum myconis L.; Myconia myconis (L.) Briq.; Pyrethrum myconis (L.) Moench

= Coleostephus myconis =

Species of flowering plant

Coleostephus myconis, known as the corn marigold, is an annual herbaceous plant belonging to the genus Coleostephus of the family Asteraceae.

== Description ==
Coleostephus myconis is an annual plant that reaches a height of 20–50 centimetres (8–20 in). It is glabrous to hairy, the stem is erect, usually branched. The lower leaves are spatulate. the median ones are lanceolate, dentate, more or less amplexicaul. Inflorescences are orange-yellow, about 2–3 centimetres (0.8–1.2 in) wide, solitary and terminal. The flowering period extends from April to July.

== Distribution and ecology ==
C. myconis occurs in the Mediterranean region of southern Europe. It usually grows in grassy fields, at altitudes of 0–800 metres (0–2,625 ft). It has also been introduced in the south of Brazil, Argentina and Uruguay, where it is considered an invasive species.
