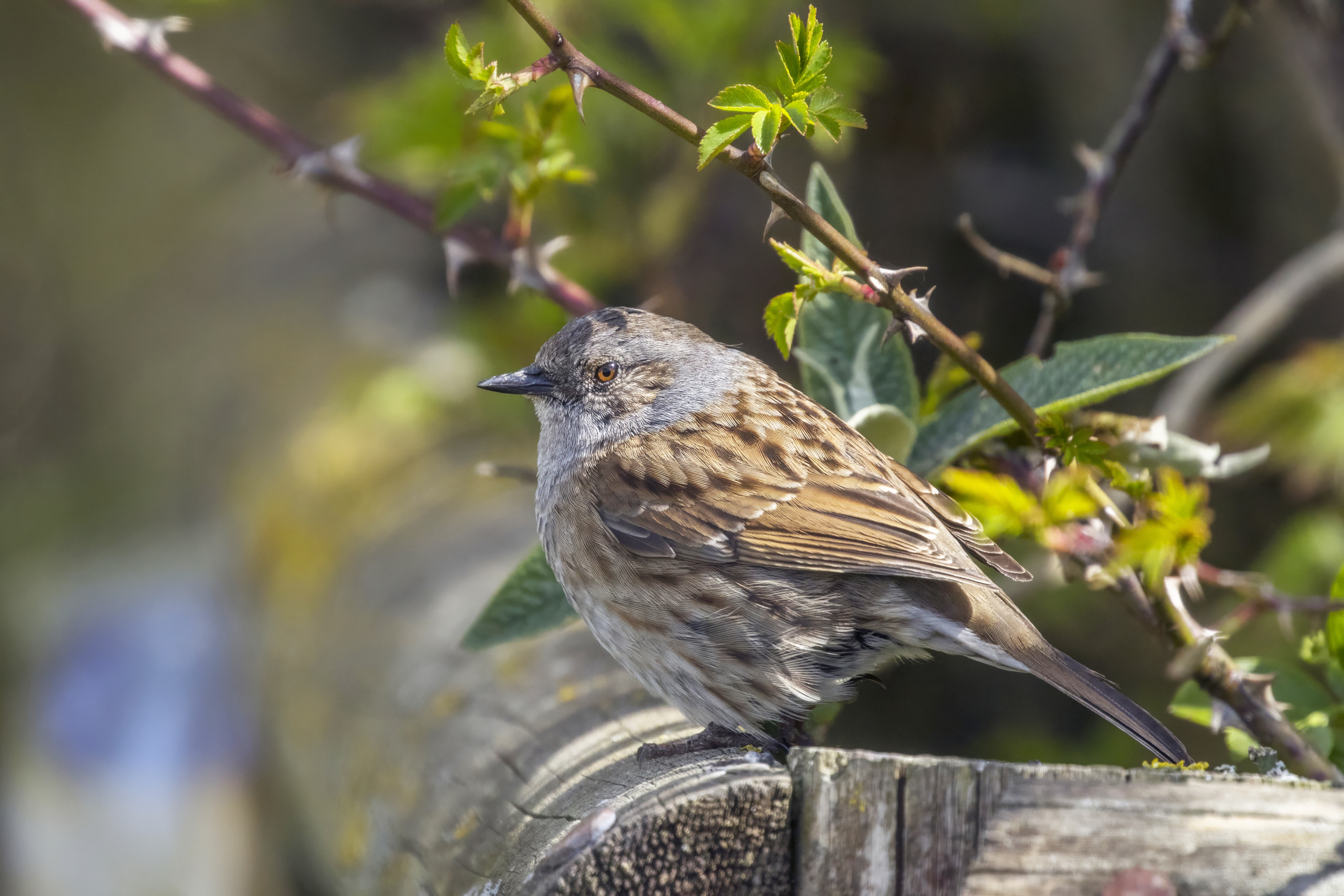

Conservation status
- Least Concern (IUCN 3.1)

Scientific classification
- Kingdom: Animalia
- Phylum: Chordata
- Class: Aves
- Order: Passeriformes
- Family: Prunellidae
- Genus: Prunella
- Species: P. modularis

Binomial name
- Prunella modularis (Linnaeus, 1758)
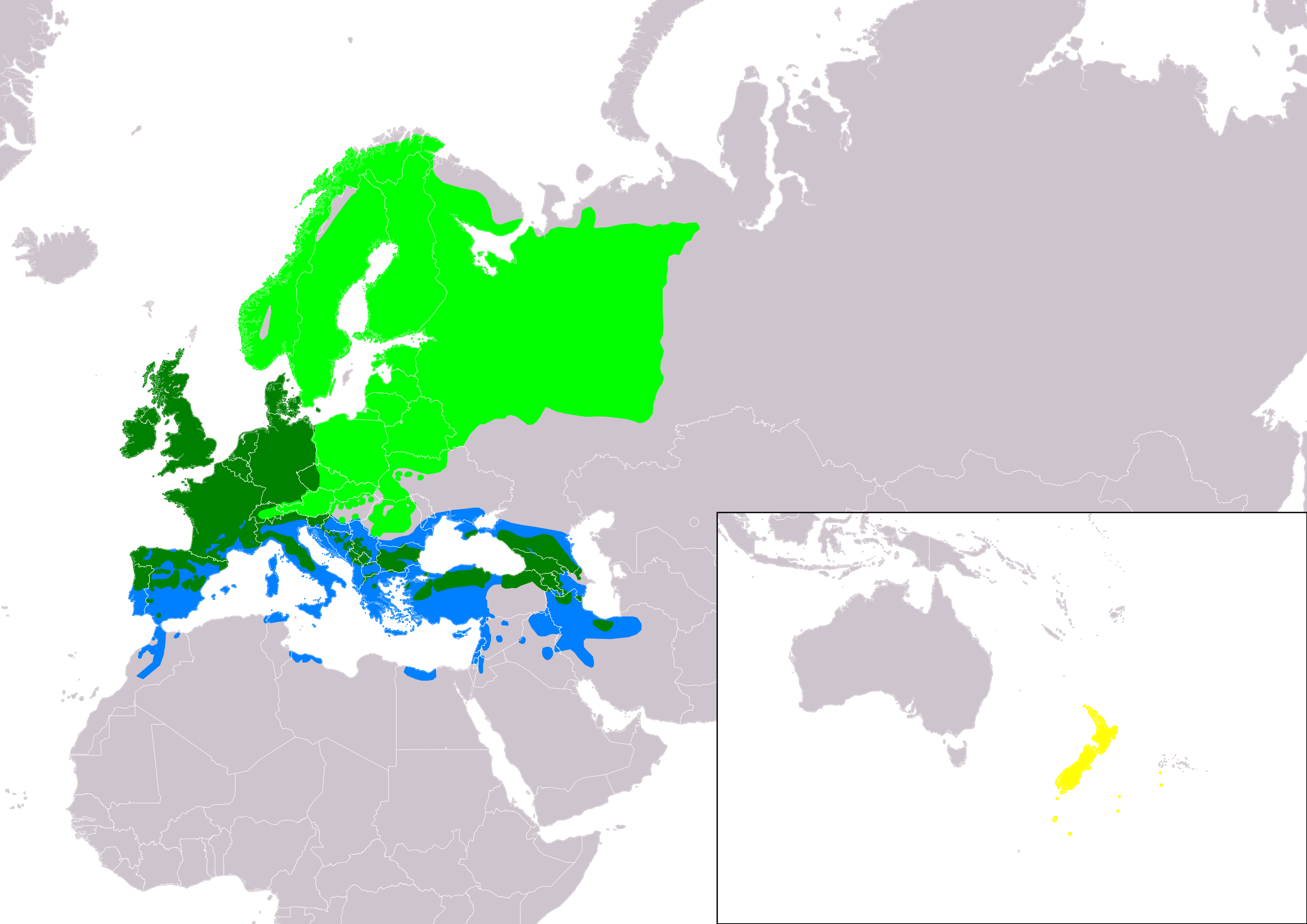
- Global range Summer range Year-round range Winter range Non-native range

Synonyms
- Motacilla modularis Linnaeus, 1758; Accentor modularis (Linnaeus, 1758)

Audio
- Song recorded on Dartmoor in Devon, England

= Dunnock =

Species of bird

Prunella modularis

The dunnock (Prunella modularis) is a small passerine, or perching bird, found throughout temperate Europe and into Asian Russia. Dunnocks have also been introduced and become common in New Zealand. It is the most widespread member of the accentor family; most other accentors are limited to mountain habitats. Other, largely archaic, English names for the dunnock include hedge accentor, hedge sparrow, hedge warbler, and titling.

== Taxonomy ==
The dunnock was described by the Swedish naturalist Carl Linnaeus in 1758 in the tenth edition of his Systema Naturae. He coined the binomial name of Motacilla modularis. The specific epithet is from the Latin modularis "modulating" or "singing". This species is now placed in the genus Prunella that was introduced by the French ornithologist Louis Pierre Vieillot in 1816.

The name "dunnock" comes from the English dun (dingy brown, dark-coloured) and the diminutive form of bird ock (thus, the original "little brown bird"), while "accentor" is from post-classical Latin and means a person who sings with another. The genus name Prunella is from the German Braunelle, "dunnock", a diminutive of braun, "brown".

Seven subspecies are accepted by the IOC list:

- P. m. hebridium Meinertzhagen, R, 1934 – Ireland and the Hebrides (west of Scotland)
- P. m. occidentalis (Hartert, 1910) – Scotland (except the Hebrides), England, Wales and west France
- P. m. modularis (Linnaeus, 1758) – north and central, and southeast Europe (including the formerly accepted P. m. meinertzhageni of the Balkans)
- P. m. fuscata Mauersberger, 1971 – south Crimean Peninsula (north coast of the Black Sea)
- P. m. euxina Watson, 1961 – northwest and north Turkey
- P. m. mabbotti Harper, 1919 – Iberian Peninsula, south-central France and Italy
- P. m. obscura (Hablizl, 1783) – northeast Turkey, Caucasus and north Iran

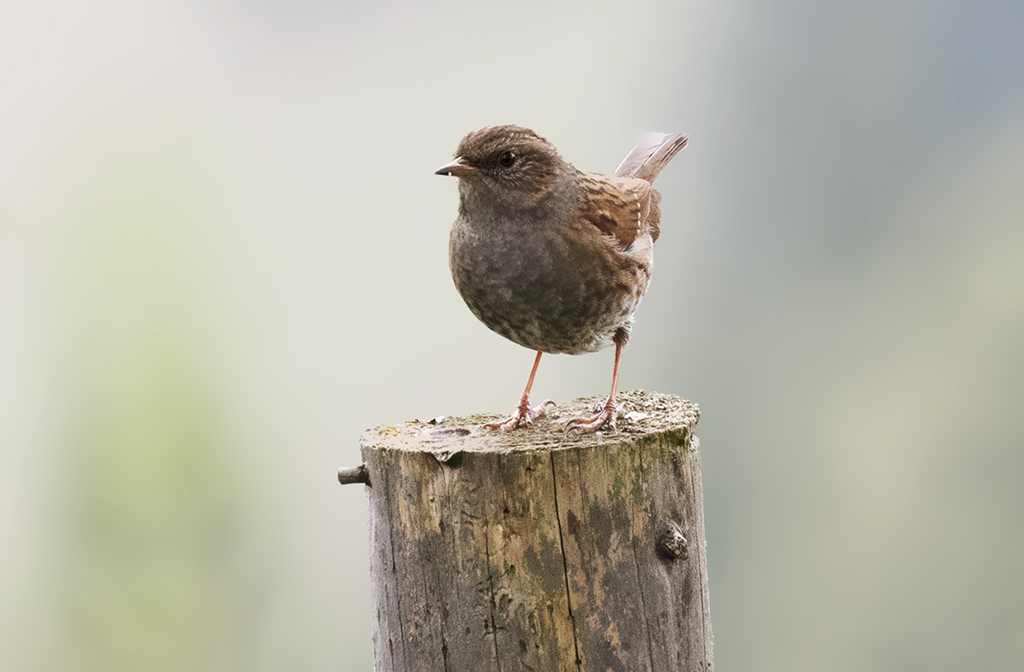
P. m. obscura, with its browner head at all ages, is the most distinct subspecies; here at Giresun, northeastern Turkey.

Acceptance of these seven subspecies has not been universal; Shirihai & Svensson (2018) accept only three subspecies, P. m. occidentalis (including P. m. hebridium), P. m. modularis (including P. m. euxina, P. m. mabbotti), and P. m. obscura (including P. m. fuscata). Another study however recently suggested that dunnock might be better treated as three species, with P. m. mabbotti and P. m. obscura being elevated from subspecies status to separate species.

== Description ==
A robin-sized bird, the dunnock typically measures 13–14.5 cm (5.1–5.7 in) in length. It has a brown back streaked blackish, somewhat resembling a small house sparrow. Like that species, the dunnock has a drab appearance which may have evolved as camouflage to avoid predation. It is brownish underneath, and has a fine pointed bill. Adults have a dull grey head, and both sexes are similarly coloured; juveniles are browner on the head, looser, 'fluffy' feathering, and more obviously streaked overall. Unlike any similar sized small brown bird in Europe, dunnocks exhibit frequent wing flicking, especially when engaged in territorial disputes or when competing for mating rights. This gave rise to the old nickname of "shufflewing".

The main call of the dunnock is a shrill, persistent tseep along with a short, weak trilling note, which betrays the bird's otherwise inconspicuous presence. The song is rapid, thin and tinkling, a sweet warble.

== Distribution and habitat ==
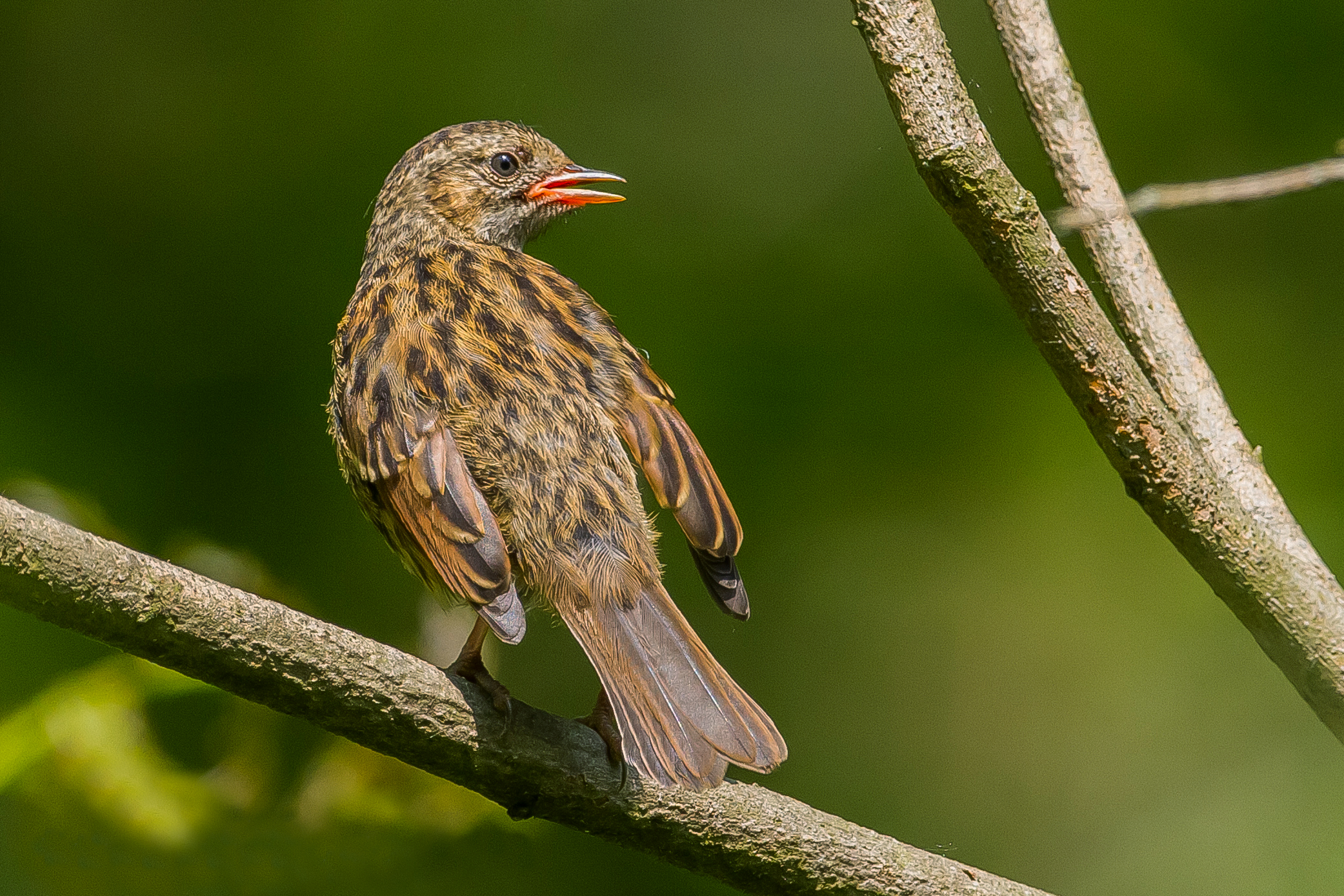
Juvenile, showing the browner, fluffy plumage. Hampshire, UK.

Dunnocks are native to large areas of Eurasia, inhabiting much of Europe and southwest Asia including Lebanon, northern Iran, and the Caucasus. It is the only accentor commonly found in temperate lowland areas; the others all inhabit upland areas, or (Siberian accentor) subarctic lowlands. Favoured habitats include woodlands, shrubs, gardens, and hedgerows where they typically feed on the ground, often seeking out detritivores as food, though it will take seeds, especially in Winter.

Dunnocks were intentionally introduced into New Zealand during the 19th century, and are now widely distributed around the country and some offshore islands.

== Territoriality ==
Dunnocks are territorial and may engage in conflict with other birds that encroach upon their nests. Males sometimes share a territory and exhibit a strict dominance hierarchy. Nevertheless, this social dominance is not translated into benefits to the alpha male in terms of reproduction, since paternity is usually equally shared between males of the group. Furthermore, members of a group are rarely related, and so competition can result.

Female territorial ranges are almost always exclusive. However, sometimes, multiple males will co-operate to defend a single territory containing multiple females. Males exhibit a strong dominance hierarchy within groups: older birds tend to be the dominant males and first-year birds are usually sub-dominant. Studies have found that close male relatives almost never share a territory.

The male's ability to access females generally depends on female range size, which is affected by the distribution of food. When resources are distributed in dense patches, female ranges tend to be small and easy for males to monopolise. Subsequent mating systems, as discussed below, reflect high reproductive success for males and relatively lower success for females. In times of scarcity, female territories expand to accommodate the lack of resources, causing males to have a more difficult time monopolising females. Hence, females gain a reproductive advantage over males in this case.

== Breeding ==
=== Mating systems ===
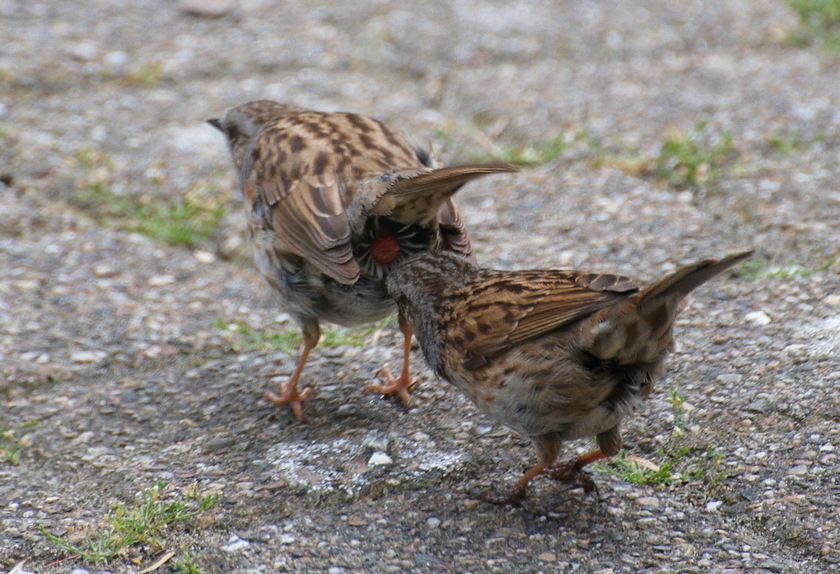
Male dunnock pecking cloaca of female before mating

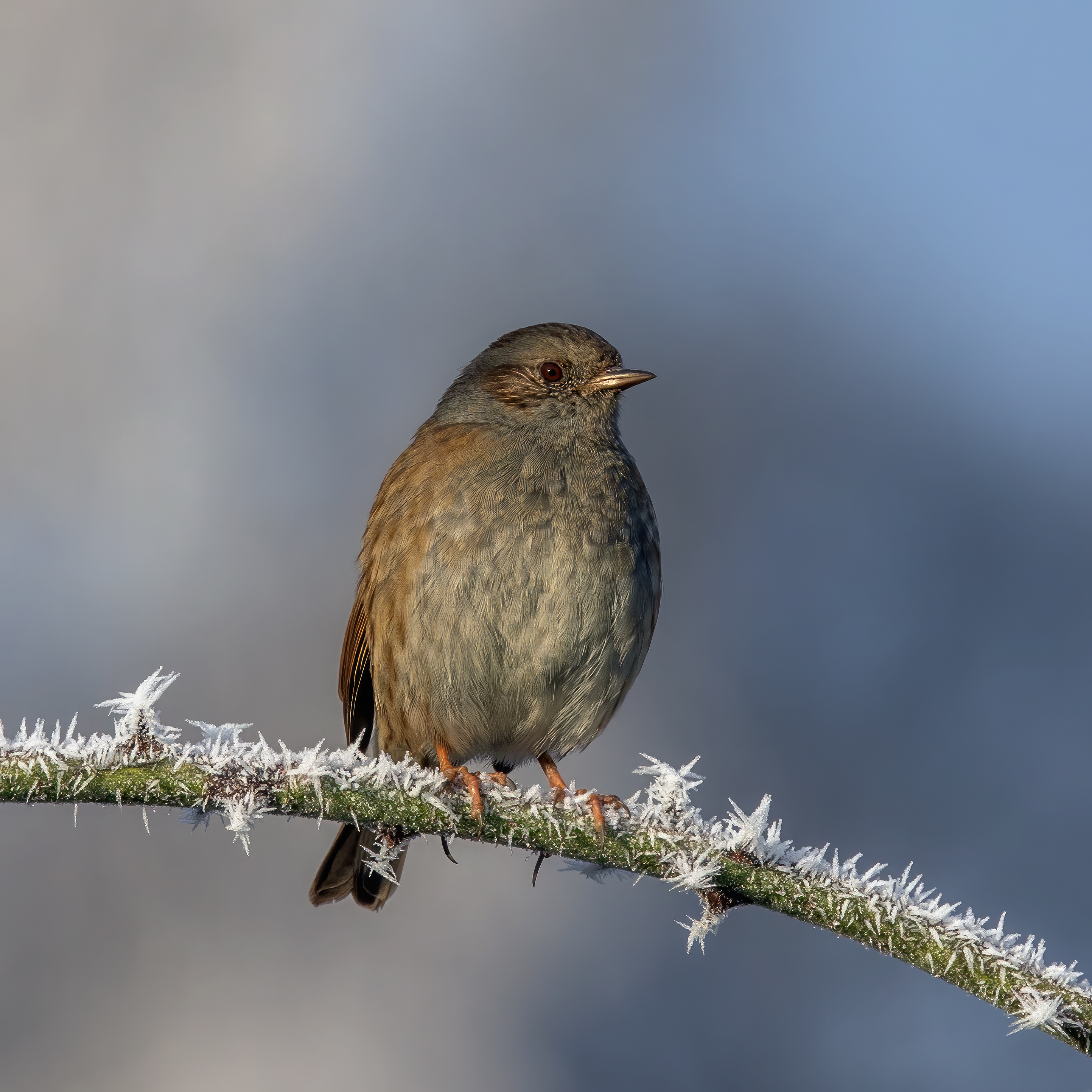
On branch with hoar frost

The dunnock possesses variable mating systems. Females are often polyandrous, breeding with two or more males at once, which is quite rare among birds. This multiple mating system leads to the development of sperm competition amongst the male suitors. DNA fingerprinting has shown that chicks within a brood often have different fathers, depending on the success of the males at monopolising the female. Males try to ensure their paternity by pecking at the cloaca. of the female to stimulate ejection of rival males' sperm. Dunnocks take just one-tenth of a second to copulate and can mate more than 100 times a day. Males provide parental care in proportion to their mating success, so two males and a female can commonly be seen provisioning nestlings at one nest.

Other mating systems also exist within dunnock populations, depending on the ratio of male to females and the overlap of territories. When only one female and one male territory overlap, monogamy is preferred. Sometimes, two or three adjacent female territories overlap one male territory, and so polygyny is favoured, with the male monopolising several females. Polygynandry also exists, in which two males jointly defend a territory containing several females. Polyandry, though, is the most common mating system of dunnocks found in nature. Depending on the population, males generally have the best reproductive success in polygynous populations, while females have the advantage during polyandry.

Studies have illustrated the fluidity of dunnock mating systems. When given food in abundance, female territory size is reduced drastically. Consequently, males can more easily monopolise the females. Thus, the mating system can be shifted from one that favours female success (polyandry), to one that promotes male success (monogamy, polygynandry, or polygyny).

=== Nest ===
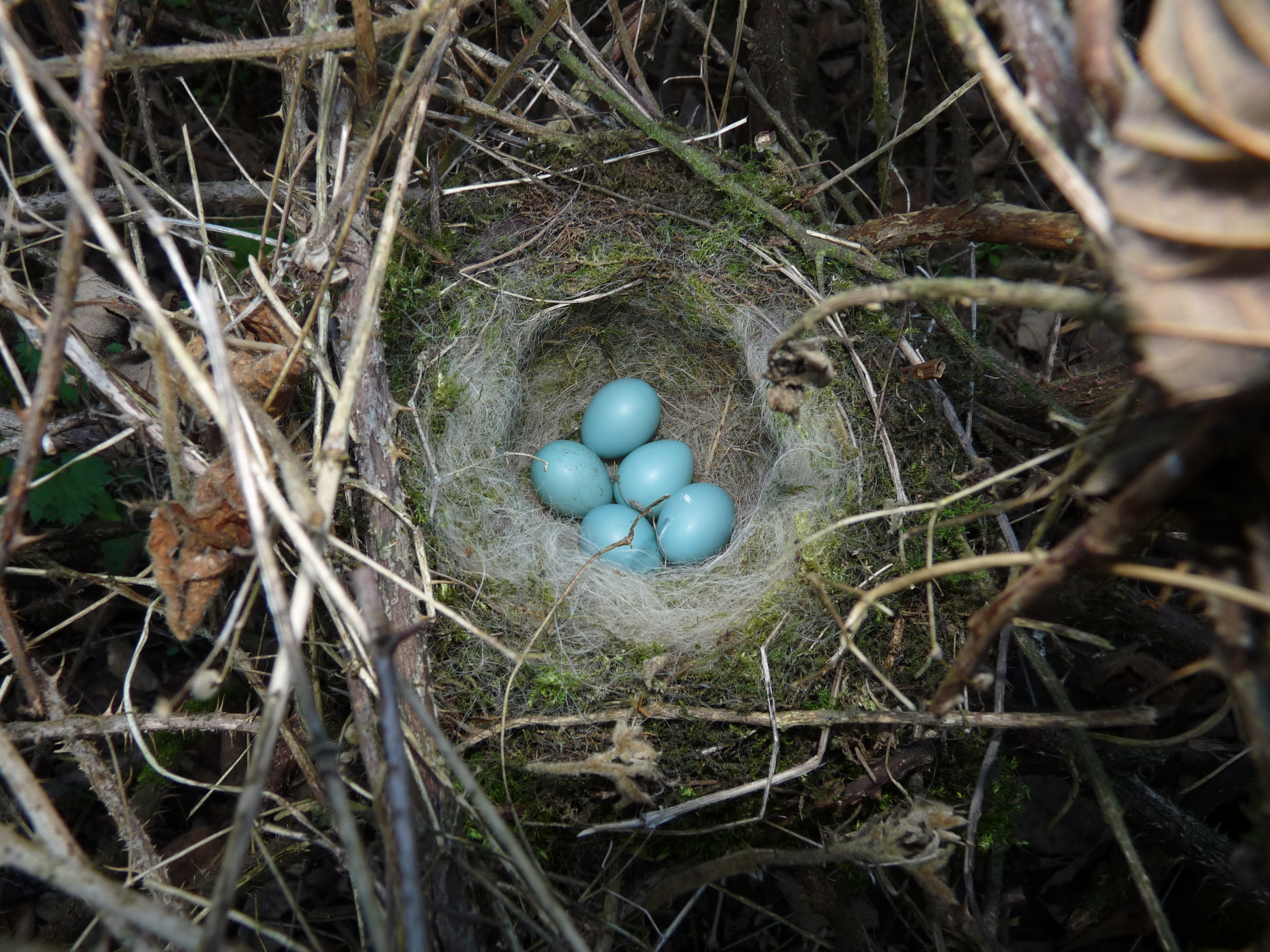
Dunnock nest and eggs

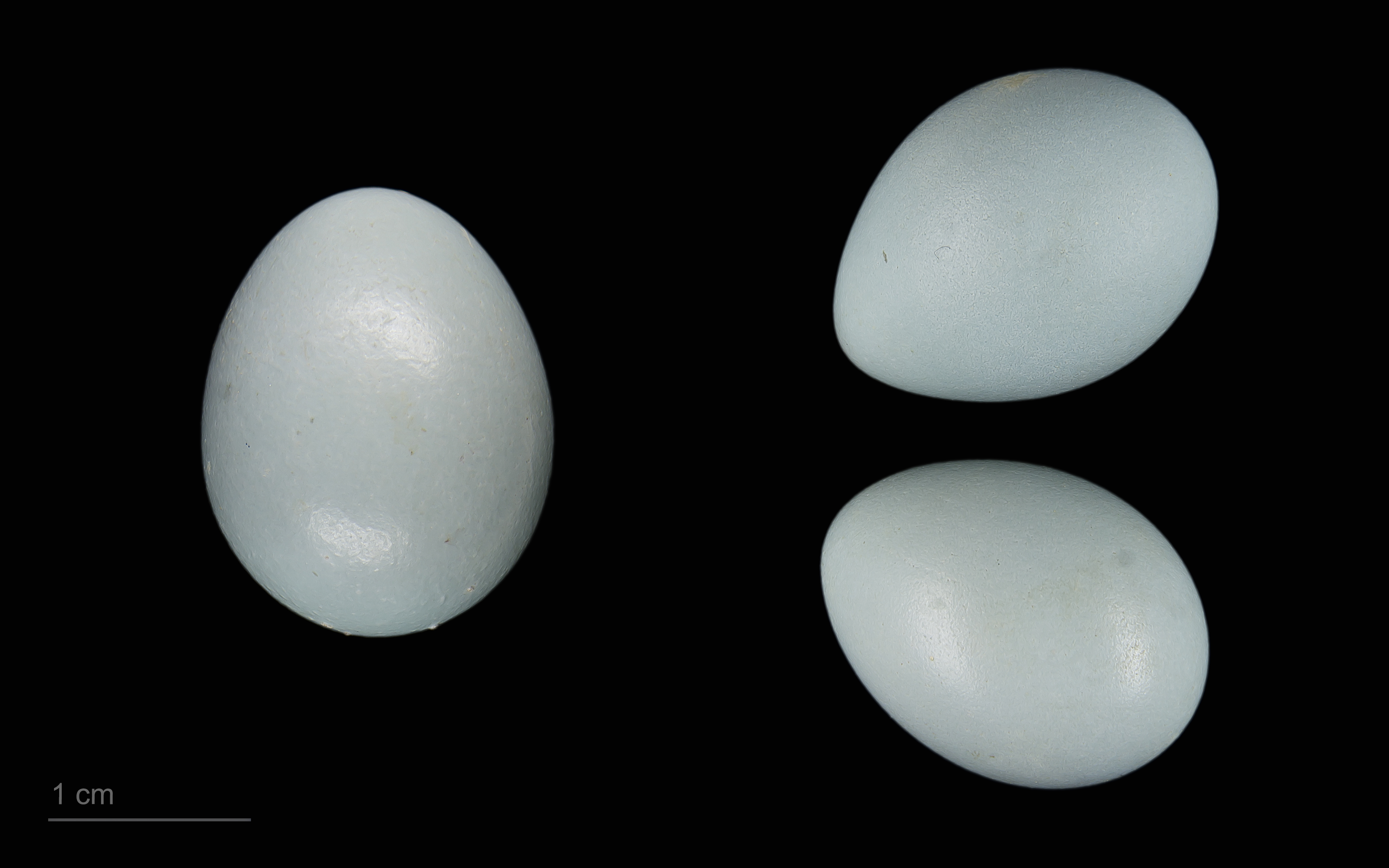
Egg of Cuculus canorus canorus in a spawn of Prunella modularis - MHNT

The dunnock builds a nest (predominantly from twigs and moss and lined with soft materials such as wool or feathers), low in a bush or conifer, where adults typically lay three to five unspotted blue eggs.

=== Parental care and provisioning ===
Broods, depending on the population, can be raised by a lone female, multiple females with the part-time help of a male, multiple females with full-time help by a male, or by multiple females and multiple males. In pairs, the male and the female invest parental care at similar rates. However, in trios, the female and alpha male invest more care in chicks than does the beta male. In territories in which females are able to escape from males, both the alpha and beta males share provisioning equally. This last system represents the best case scenario for females, as it helps to ensure maximal care and the success of the young.

A study has found that males tend to not discriminate between their own young and those of another male in polyandrous or polygynandrous systems. However, they do vary their feeding depending on the certainty of paternity. If a male has greater access to a female, and therefore a higher chance of a successful fertilisation, during a specific mating period, it would provide more care towards the young.
