= Pokeweed (disambiguation) =

Pokeweed may refer to several species of genus Phytolacca:

- Phytolacca americana, or American pokeweed
- Phytolacca acinosa, or Indian pokeweed
- Phytolacca sandwicensis, or Hawai'i pokeweed
- Phytolacca pruinosa, or Levantine pokeweed

== See also ==
- Phytolaccaceae, also known as the pokeweed family
