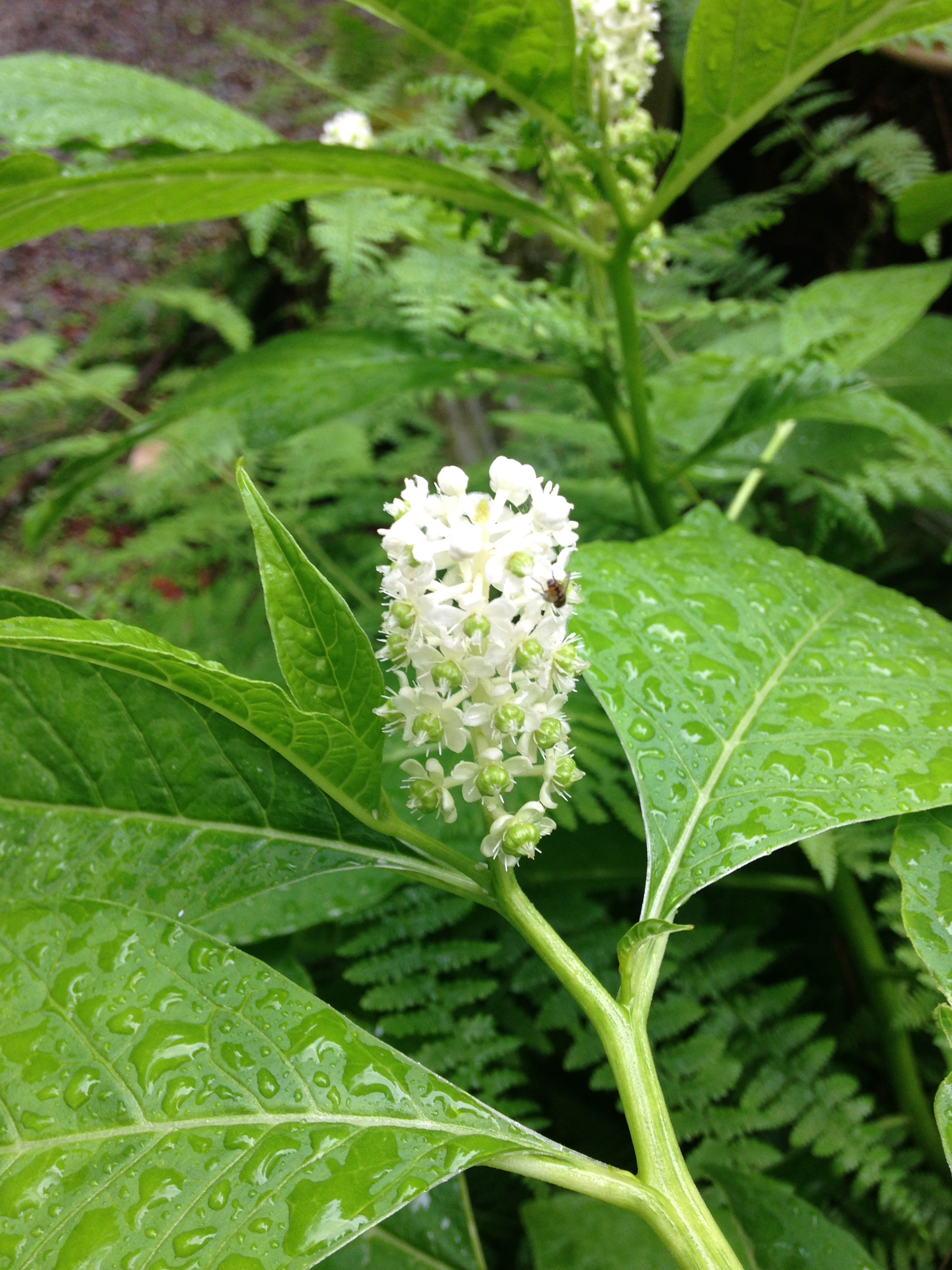

Scientific classification
- Kingdom: Plantae
- Clade: Tracheophytes
- Clade: Angiosperms
- Clade: Eudicots
- Order: Caryophyllales
- Family: Phytolaccaceae
- Genus: Phytolacca
- Species: P. japonica

Binomial name
- Phytolacca japonica Makino

Synonyms
- Phytolacca hunanensis Hand.-Mazz.

= Phytolacca japonica =

Species of flowering plant

Phytolacca japonica is a species of flowering plant in the pokeweed family, Phytolaccaceae. It native to eastern Asia, where it is found in China and Japan (from the Kantō region westward). Its natural habitat is in forests edges, in ravines and along riversides.

Phytolacca japonica is an herbaceous perennial, growing to 1.5 meters tall. Its stem is thick and fleshy, and turns red with age. It produces erect racemes of flowers that are initially pale pink, turning reddish with maturity. Flowering time is from June to September. Its ripe fruits are purplish-black.

It can be distinguished from the similar-looking Phytolacca acinosa by its fused carpels, and from Phytolacca americana by its more dense and erect inflorescence.
