= P. esculenta =

P. esculenta may refer to:

- Platonia esculenta, a synonym for Platonia insignis, a tree species found in South America
- Psoralea esculenta, a synonym for Pediomelum esculentum, an herbaceous perennial plant species native to prairies and dry woodlands of central North America
- Phytolacca esculenta, a synonym for Phytolacca acinosa, a large herbaceous perennial plant native to parts of Asia and introduced elsewhere

== See also ==
- List of Latin and Greek words commonly used in systematic names#E
