= P. dioica =

P. dioica may refer to:

- Phytolacca dioica, the ombú, a massive evergreen herb species growing as a tree native to the Pampas of South America
- Pimenta dioica, the allspice, Jamaica pepper, kurundu, myrtle pepper, pimenta or newspice, a mid-canopy tree species native to the Greater Antilles, southern Mexico and Central America
- Polyscias dioica, a flowering plant species in the genus Polyscias
