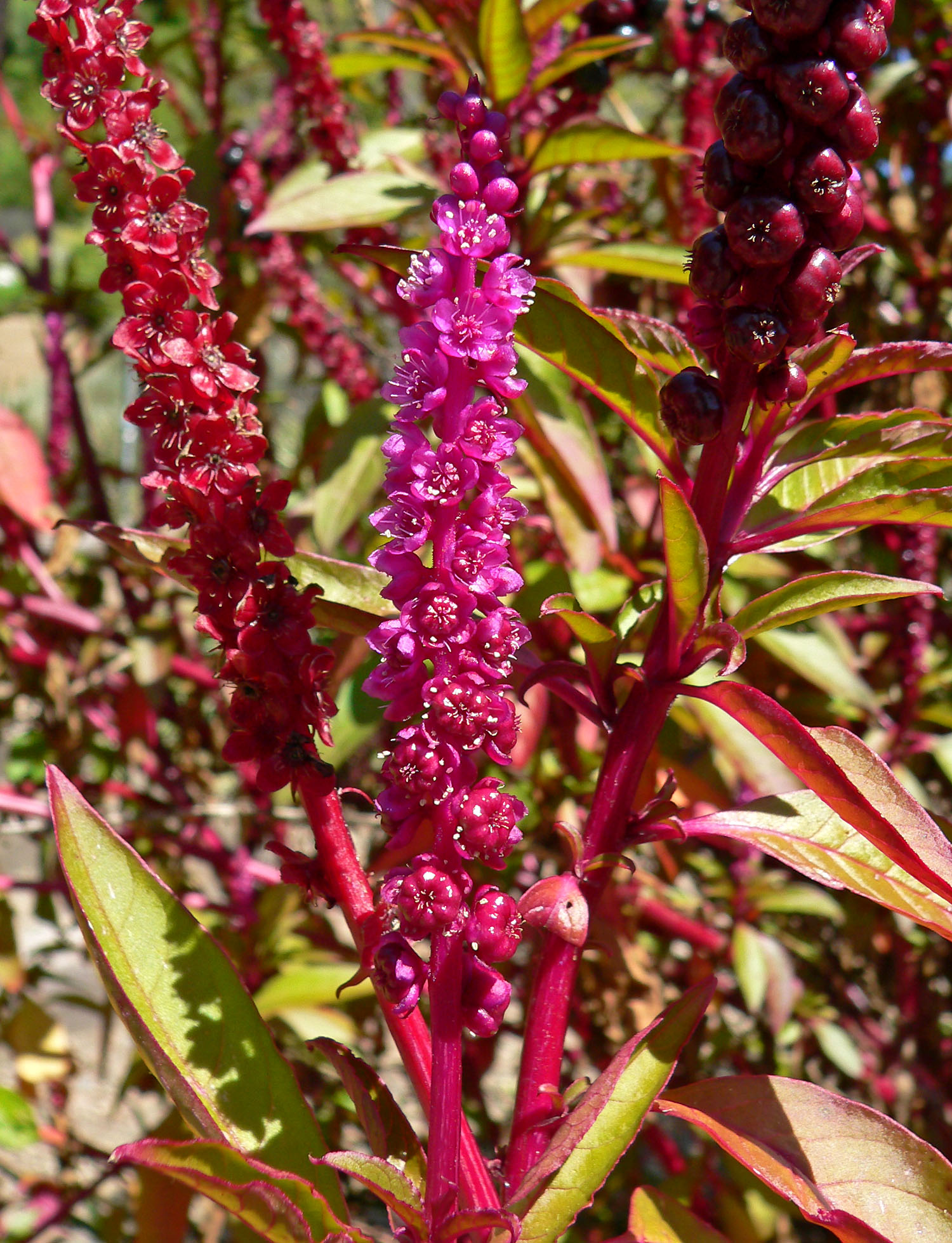

Scientific classification
- Kingdom: Plantae
- Clade: Tracheophytes
- Clade: Angiosperms
- Clade: Eudicots
- Order: Caryophyllales
- Family: Phytolaccaceae
- Genus: Phytolacca
- Species: P. icosandra

Binomial name
- Phytolacca icosandra L.

= Phytolacca icosandra =

Species of flowering plant

Phytolacca icosandra, sometimes known as button pokeweed or tropical pokeweed, is a species of flowering plant found in the neotropics and introduced into the warmer areas of the western USA.

It reaches up to 3 m in height, with leaves of 10–20 cm by 9–14 cm. The flowers are produced in racemes 10–15 cm long, each flower 5–10 mm diameter, with 8-20 stamens (icosandra means "twenty stamens"). The fruit is a black berry, 5–8 mm diameter.

Raphides occur profusely in at least the leaves, red petioles and midribs.

== Bibliography ==
- Gulliver, George (1864). "Observations on Raphides and other Crystals". The Annals and Magazine of Natural History, Including Zoology, Botany, and Geology. Third Series. 14: 250–252.
