= Pokeweed mitogen =

Type of protein

Pokeweed mitogen is a mitogen derived from the roots of Phytolacca americana. It functions as a lectin and a mitotic stimulus for the division of lymphocytes.

== Biological functions ==
This lectin specifically induces the proliferation of B cells, plasma cells and T cells. This lectin contains Toll-like receptor 4 (TLR4) proteins which signals for the B-cell for a proliferative response. B cells are shown to have no response to pure PWM without the Toll-like receptor suggesting that PWM inducing ability relies on TLR4 protein's presence for the signaling of B-cells and the response.

== Research ==
PWM can contribute to B-cell assay or other lymphocytes for testing. The amplified number of proliferated cells makes it easier to test different lymphocyte functions, biological mechanisms, and response to different stimuli. Pokeweed mitogen is also used in research studies to stimulate different lymphocytes and observe change. When looking at deficiency of CD26 in knockout mice, after stimulation with PWM the role of CD26 in development of CD4+ T cells was observed. Another study where PWM was used as a stimulus was in the proteome analysis of lymphocytes of different immune phenotypes in cows. Other research involves the PWM lectin playing a role in cancer detection. The PWM lectin was found to have affinity for human colorectal cancers indicating its usefulness in analysis of glycoconjugates found in colorectal cancer and detection of cancerous tissue.

== Clinical significance ==
Pokeweed mitogen has the ability to play a role in immunology. It can test for immunodeficiency by inducing cell proliferation and test for abnormal counts of lymphocytes. It can also induce proliferation of cells that target tumors, which is useful for the treatment of cancer. Other studies in mice showed that PWM contributes to weight-loss effects and increased glucose uptake which makes this lectin a subject for implementation in diabetes or obesity in humans.
