= Phytolacca heterotepala =

Scientific classification
- Kingdom: Plantae
- Clade: Tracheophytes
- Clade: Angiosperms
- Clade: Eudicots
- Order: Caryophyllales
- Family: Phytolaccaceae
- Genus: Phytolacca
- Species: P. heterotepala

Binomial name
- Phytolacca heterotepala H.Walt.

Species of plant

Phytolacca heterotepala, the Mexican pokeweed, is a species of plant in the pokeweed family Phytolaccaceae. It is native to the state of Tamaulipas in northeast Mexico and has been introduced to the U.S. state of California and Portugal.
