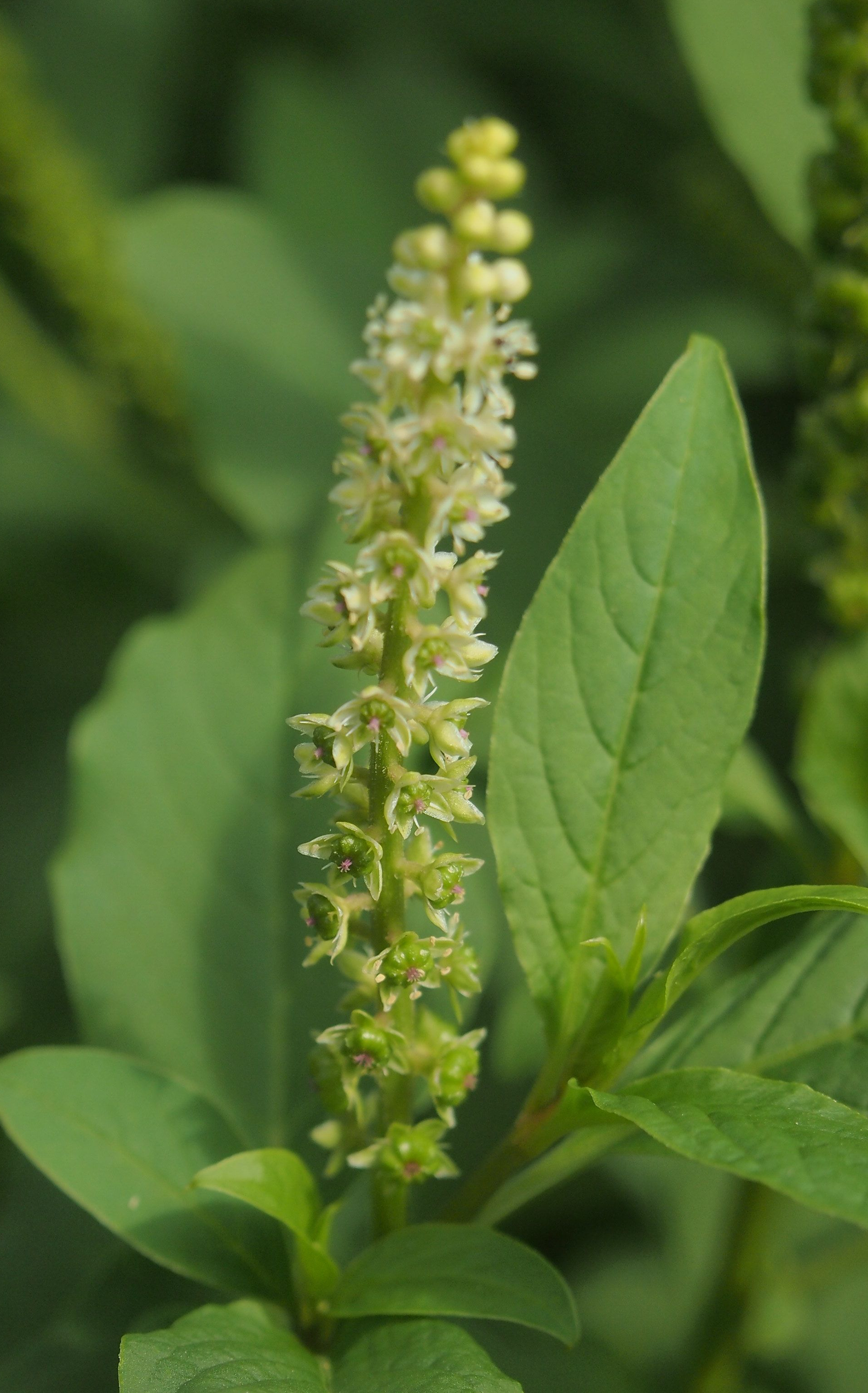

Scientific classification
- Kingdom: Plantae
- Clade: Embryophytes
- Clade: Tracheophytes
- Clade: Angiosperms
- Clade: Eudicots
- Order: Caryophyllales
- Family: Phytolaccaceae
- Genus: Phytolacca
- Species: P. octandra

Binomial name
- Phytolacca octandra L.

Synonyms
- Phytolacca americana var. mexicana L.

= Phytolacca octandra =

Species of flowering plant

Phytolacca octandra, also known as inkweed or red inkplant, is a herbaceous perennial plant in the pokeweed family Phytolaccaceae, originating from the Neotropical realm of the Americas.

== Description ==
Inkweed is a member of the family Phytolaccaceae, growing up to 1 metre (3 1/2 feet). The leaves measure 6–15 cm (2.4–5.9 in) in length.

== Taxonomy ==
Phytolacca octandra was first described by Carl Linnaeus in the second edition of Species Plantarum in 1762. The name Phytolacca is derived from the Greek word phyton ("plant") and the Latin word lacca ("red dye"), while Octandra is a Latin name referring to the eight stamens of the plant. The species is sometimes considered a synonym for Phytolacca icosandra.

== Distribution ==
The species is found globally in subtropical and tropical regions worldwide.

== Gallery ==
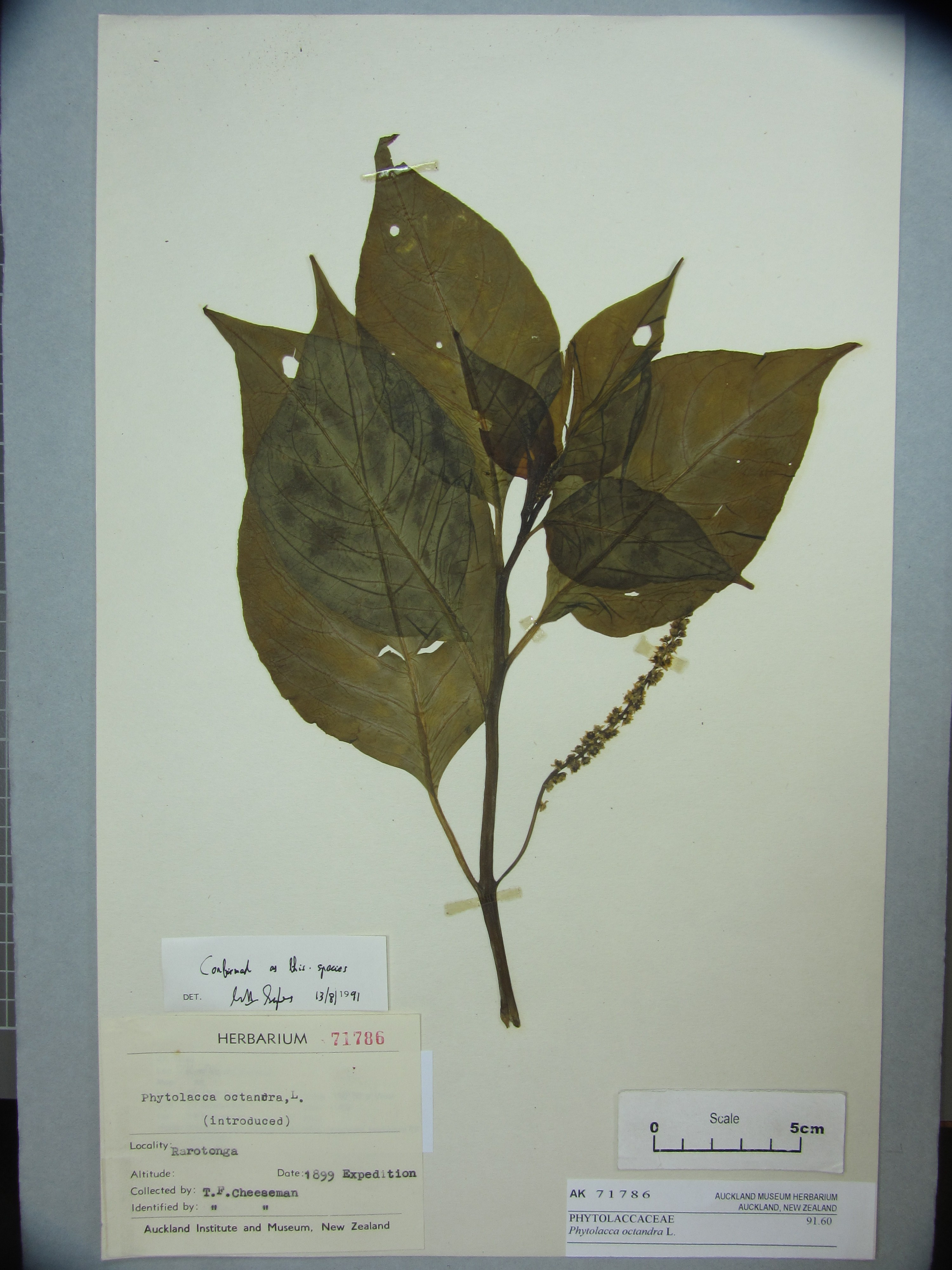
Herbarium specimen

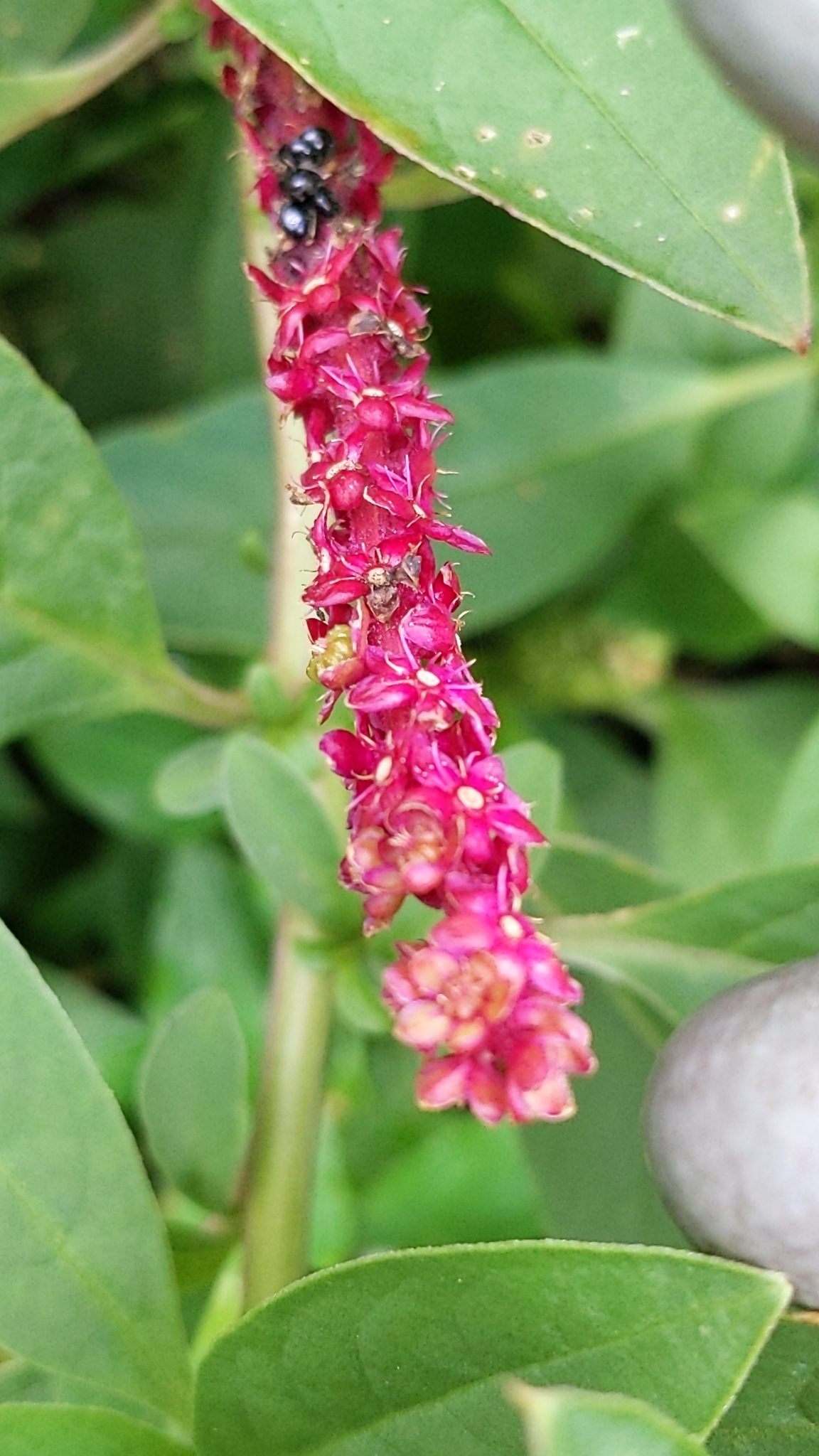
Flowers

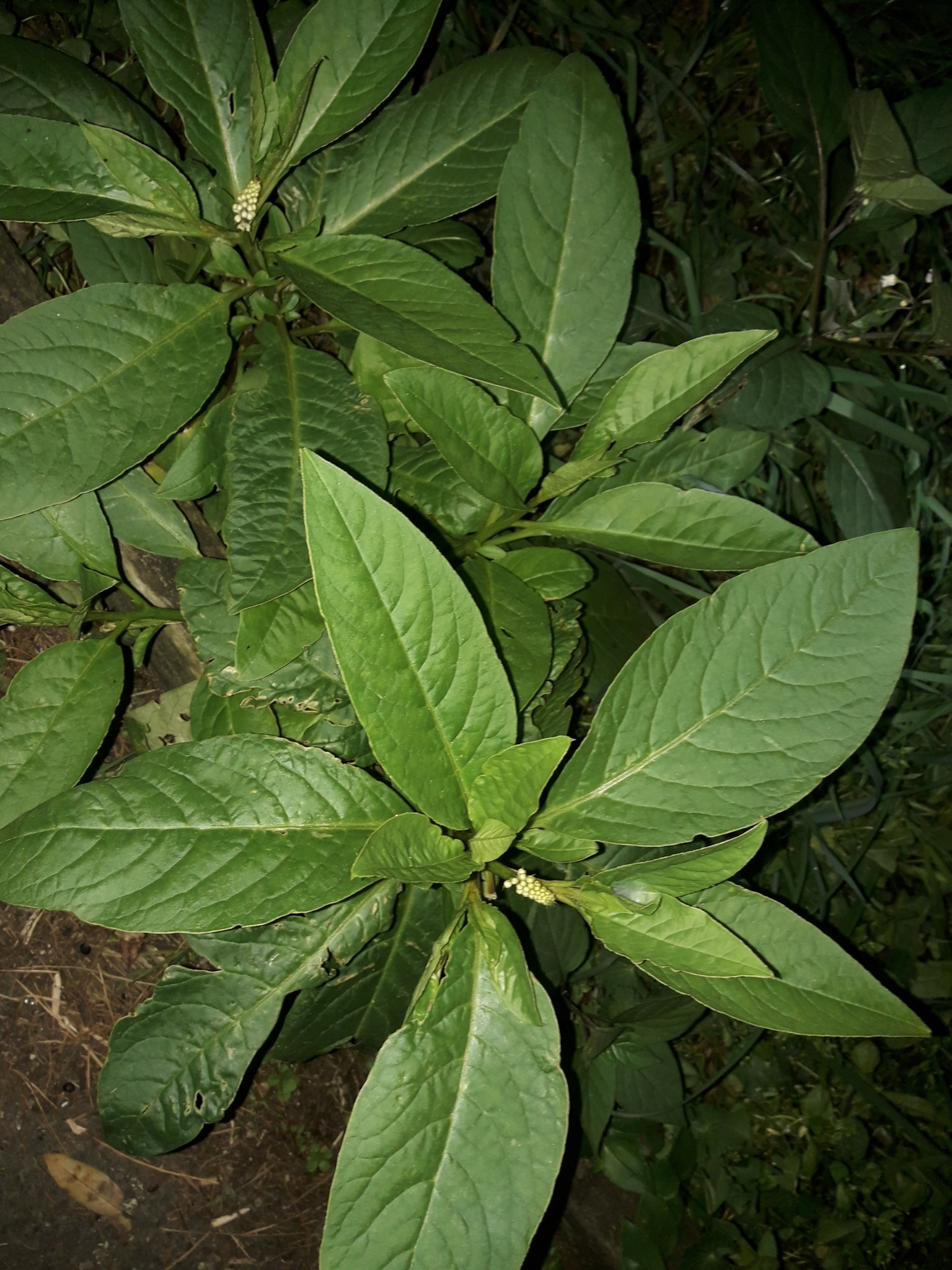
Leaves

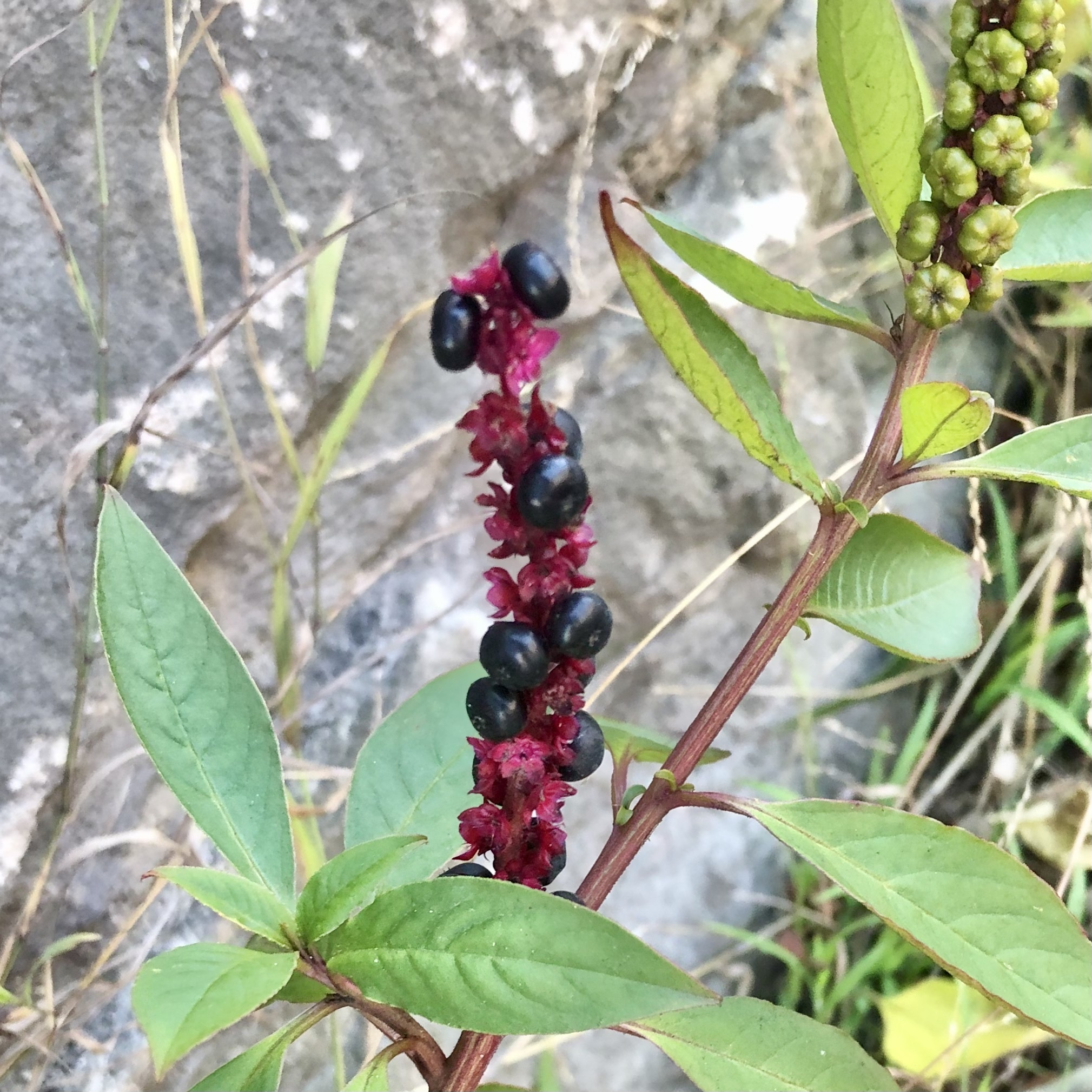
Ripe fruit (centre) and unripe fruit (right)
