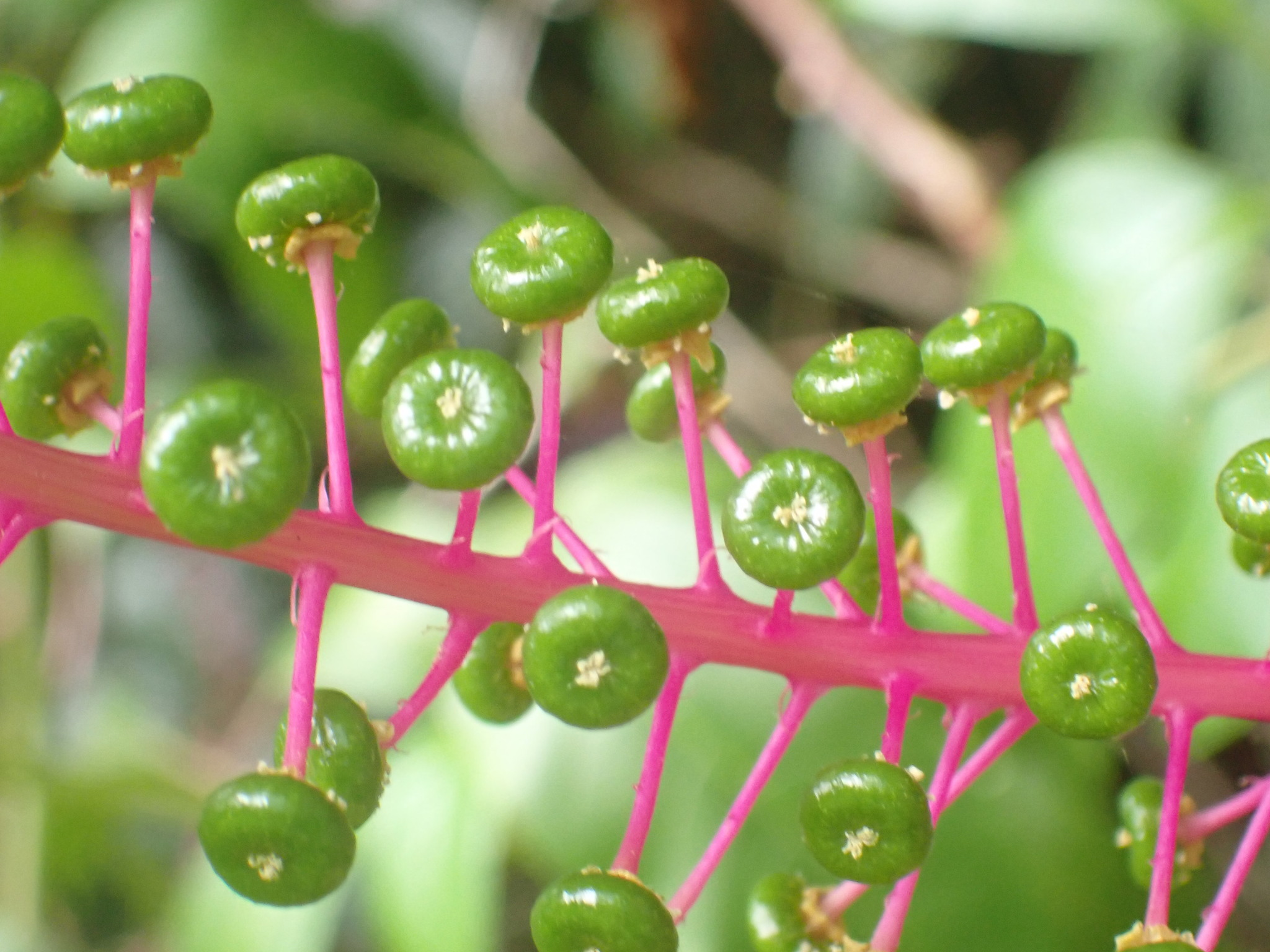

Scientific classification
- Kingdom: Plantae
- Clade: Tracheophytes
- Clade: Angiosperms
- Clade: Eudicots
- Order: Caryophyllales
- Family: Phytolaccaceae
- Genus: Phytolacca
- Species: P. rivinoides

Binomial name
- Phytolacca rivinoides Kunth & C.D.Bouché

Synonyms
- Phytolacca icosandra var. fraseri Moq.; Phytolacca polystyla R.H.Schomb. ex Moq.

= Phytolacca rivinoides =

Species of shrub

Phytolacca rivinoides, also known by its common name Venezuelan pokeweed, is a species of shrub in the family Phytolaccaceae.
