= Mitogen =

Type of protein or peptide

A mitogen is a small bioactive protein or peptide that induces a cell to begin cell division, or enhances the rate of division (mitosis). Mitogenesis is the induction (triggering) of mitosis, typically via a mitogen.

== The cell cycle ==
Mitogens act primarily by influencing a set of proteins which are involved in the restriction of progression through the cell cycle. The G1 checkpoint is controlled most directly by mitogens: further cell cycle progression does not need mitogens to continue. The point where mitogens are no longer needed to move the cell cycle forward is called the "restriction point" and depends on cyclins to be passed. One of the most important of these is TP53, a gene which produces a family of proteins known as p53. It, combined with the Ras pathway, downregulate cyclin D1, a cyclin-dependent kinase, if they are not stimulated by the presence of mitogens. In the presence of mitogens, sufficient cyclin D1 can be produced. This process cascades onwards, producing other cyclins which stimulate the cell sufficiently to allow cell division. While animals produce internal signals that can drive the cell cycle forward, external mitogens can cause it to progress without these signals.

== Endogenous mitogens ==
Mitogens can be either endogenous or exogenous factors. Endogenous mitogens function to control cell division is a normal and necessary part of the life cycle of multicellular organisms. For example, in zebrafish, an endogenous mitogen Nrg1 is produced in response to indications of heart damage. When it is expressed, it causes the outer layers of the heart to respond by increasing division rates and producing new layers of heart muscle cells to replace the damaged ones. This pathway can potentially be deleterious, however: expressing Nrg1 in the absence of heart damage causes uncontrolled growth of heart cells, creating an enlarged heart. Some growth factors, such as vascular endothelial growth factor, are also capable of directly acting as mitogens, causing growth by directly inducing cell replication. This is not true for all growth factors, as some growth factors instead appear to cause mitogenic effects like growth indirectly by triggering other mitogens to be released, as evidenced by their lack of mitogenic activity in vitro, which VEGF has. Other well-known mitogenic growth factors include platelet derived growth factor (PDGF) and epidermal growth factor (EGF).

== Relationship to cancer ==
Mitogens are important in cancer research due to their effects on the cell cycle. Cancer is in part defined by a lack of, or failure of, control in the cell cycle. This is usually a combination of two abnormalities: first, cancer cells lose their dependence on mitogens. Second, cancer cells are resistant to anti-mitogens.

=== Independence from mitogens ===
Rather than requiring endogenous or external mitogens to continue the cell cycle, cancer cells are able to grow, survive, and replicate without mitogens. Cancer cells may lose their dependence on external mitogens by a variety of pathways.

First, cancer cells can produce their own mitogens, a term called autocrine stimulation. This can result in a deadly positive feedback loop - tumor cells produce their own mitogens, which stimulate more tumor cells to replicate, which can then produce even more mitogens. For example, consider one of the earliest oncogenes to be identified, p28sis from the simian sarcoma virus, which causes tumorigenesis in the host animal. Scientists found that p28sis has a nearly identical amino acid sequence as human platelet-derived growth factor (PDGF). Thus, tumors formed by the simian sarcoma virus are no longer dependent on the fluctuations of PDGF that control cell growth; instead, they can produce their own mitogens in the form of p28sis. With enough p28sis activity, the cells can proliferate without restriction, resulting in cancer.

Second, cancer cells can have mutated cell-surface receptors for mitogens. The protein kinase domain found on mitogenic receptors is often hyperactivated in cancer cells, remaining turned on even in the absence of external mitogens. Additionally, some cancers are associated with an overproduction of mitogenic receptors on the cell surface. With this mutation, cells are stimulated to divide by abnormally low levels of mitogens. One such example is HER2, a receptor tyrosine kinase that responds to the mitogen EGF. Overexpression of HER2 is common in 15-30% of breast cancers, allowing the cell cycle to progress even with extremely low concentrations of EGF. The overexpression of kinase activity in these cells aids in their proliferation. These are known as hormone-dependent breast cancers, as the kinase activation in these cancers is connected to exposure to both growth factors and estradiol.

Third, downstream effectors of mitogenic signaling are often mutated in cancer cells. An important mitogenic signaling pathway in humans is the Ras-Raf-MAPK pathway. Mitogenic signaling normally activates Ras, a GTPase, that then activates the rest of the MAPK pathway, ultimately expressing proteins that stimulate cell cycle progression. It is likely that most, if not all, cancers have some mutation in the Ras-Raf-MAPK pathway, most commonly in Ras. These mutations allow the pathway to be constitutively activated, regardless of the presence of mitogens.

=== Resistance to anti-mitogens ===
Cell proliferation is often regulated by not only external mitogens but also by anti-mitogens, which inhibit cell cycle progression past G1. In normal cells, anti-mitogenic signaling is a result of DNA damage, preventing the cells from replicating and dividing. Tumor cells that are resistant to anti-mitogens allow the cell cycle to move forward when it should be prevented by some anti-mitogenic mechanism. This resistance to anti-mitogens might simply arise from overstimulation by positive mitogens. In other cases, tumor cells possess loss-of-function mutations in some part of the anti-mitogenic pathway. For example, consider the well-known anti-mitogen, transforming growth factor (TGF-𝝱). TGF-𝝱 works by binding to cell-surface receptors and activating the Smad gene regulatory proteins. Smad proteins then trigger an increase in p15, which inhibits cyclin D1 and prevents cell cycle progression. In many cancers, there is a loss-of-function mutation in the Smad proteins, thus negating the entire anti-mitogenic pathway.

=== Multiple mutations required ===
Not just one but multiple mitogenic mutations are required for cancer to proliferate. Generally, multiple mutations in different subsystems (an oncogene and a tumor suppressor gene) are the most effective at causing cancer. For example, a mutation that hyperactivates the oncogene Ras and another that inactivates the tumor suppressor pRb is far more tumorigenic than either protein alone. Tumor cells are also resistant to the hyperproliferation stress response. Normal cells have apoptotic proteins that will respond to an overstimulation of mitogenic signaling pathways by triggering cell death or senescence. This generally prevents the onset of cancer from a single oncogenic mutation. In tumor cells, there is generally another mutation that inhibits apoptotic proteins as well, suppressing the hyperproliferation stress response.

== Use in immunology ==
Lymphocytes can enter mitosis when they are activated by mitogens or antigens. B cells specifically can divide when they encounter an antigen matching their immunoglobulin. T cells undergo mitosis when stimulated by mitogens to produce small lymphocytes that are then responsible for the production of lymphokines, which are substances that modify the host organism to improve its immunity. B cells, on the other hand, divide to produce plasma cells when stimulated by mitogens, which then produce immunoglobulins, or antibodies. Mitogens are often used to stimulate lymphocytes and thereby assess immune function. The most commonly used mitogens in clinical laboratory medicine are:

Name	Acts upon T cells?	Acts upon B cells?
phytohaemagglutinin (PHA)	yes	no
concanavalin A (conA)	yes	no
lipopolysaccharide (LPS)	no	yes
pokeweed mitogen (PWM)	yes	yes

Lipopolysaccharide toxin from gram-negative bacteria is thymus-independent. They may directly activate B cells through the PI3-kinase signalling pathway, regardless of their antigenic specificity. Plasma cells are terminally differentiated and, therefore, cannot undergo mitosis. Memory B cells can proliferate to produce more memory cells or plasma B cells. This is how the mitogen works, that is, by inducing mitosis in memory B cells to cause them to divide, with some becoming plasma cells.

== Other uses ==
Mitogen-activated protein kinase (MAPK) pathways can induce enzymes such as the COX-2 enzyme. MAPK pathways may also play a role in the regulation of PTGS2.

== See also ==
- Growth factor
- MAPK/ERK pathway
- Lectins
