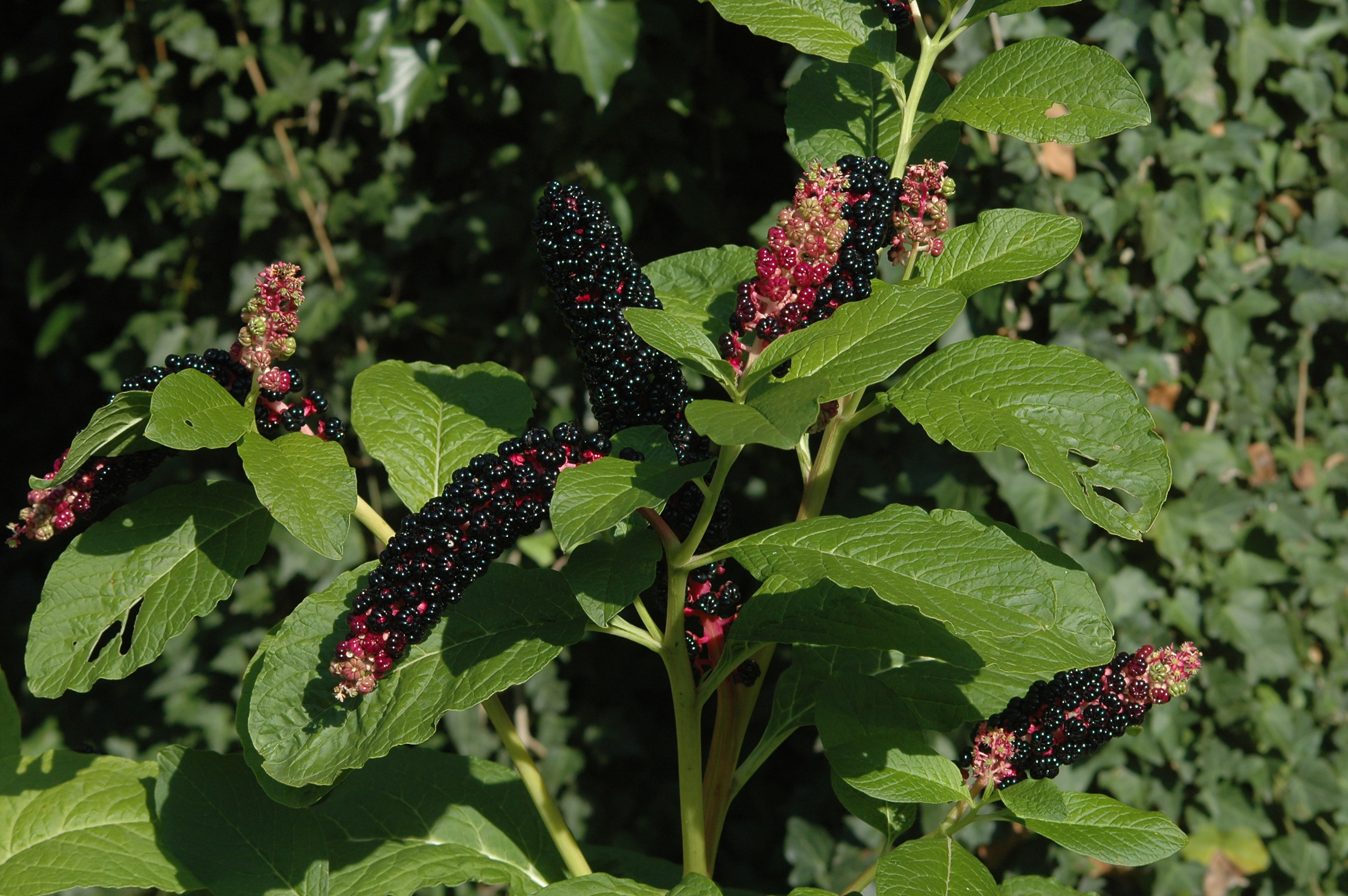
- Phytolacca acinosa foliage and fruit

Scientific classification
- Kingdom: Plantae
- Clade: Embryophytes
- Clade: Tracheophytes
- Clade: Angiosperms
- Clade: Eudicots
- Order: Caryophyllales
- Family: Phytolaccaceae
- Subfamily: Phytolaccoideae
- Genus: Phytolacca; L.

Species
- About 25 to 35 species

Synonyms
- Pircunia Bertero ex Ruschenb.

= Phytolacca =

Genus of plants

Phytolacca is a genus of perennial plants native to North America, South America and East Asia. Some members of the genus are known as pokeweeds or similar names such as pokebush, pokeberry, pokeroot or poke sallet. Other names for species of Phytolacca include inkberry and ombú. The generic name is derived from the Greek word φυτόν (phyton), meaning "plant," and the Latin word lacca, a red dye. Phytolaccatoxin and phytolaccagenin are present (in the leaves, stems, roots, blossoms, berries etc.) in many species which are poisonous to mammals if not prepared properly. The berries are eaten by birds, which are not affected by the toxin. The small seeds with very hard outer shells remain intact in the digestive system and are eliminated whole.

The genus comprises about 25 to 35 species of perennial herbs, shrubs, and trees growing from 1 to 25 m (3 to 80 ft) tall. They have alternate simple leaves, pointed at the end, with entire or crinkled margins; the leaves can be either deciduous or evergreen. The stems are green, pink or red. The flowers are greenish-white to pink, produced in long racemes at the ends of the stems. They develop into globose berries 4 to 12 millimetres (0.2 to 0.5 in) diameter, green at first, ripening dark purple to black.

== Selected species ==
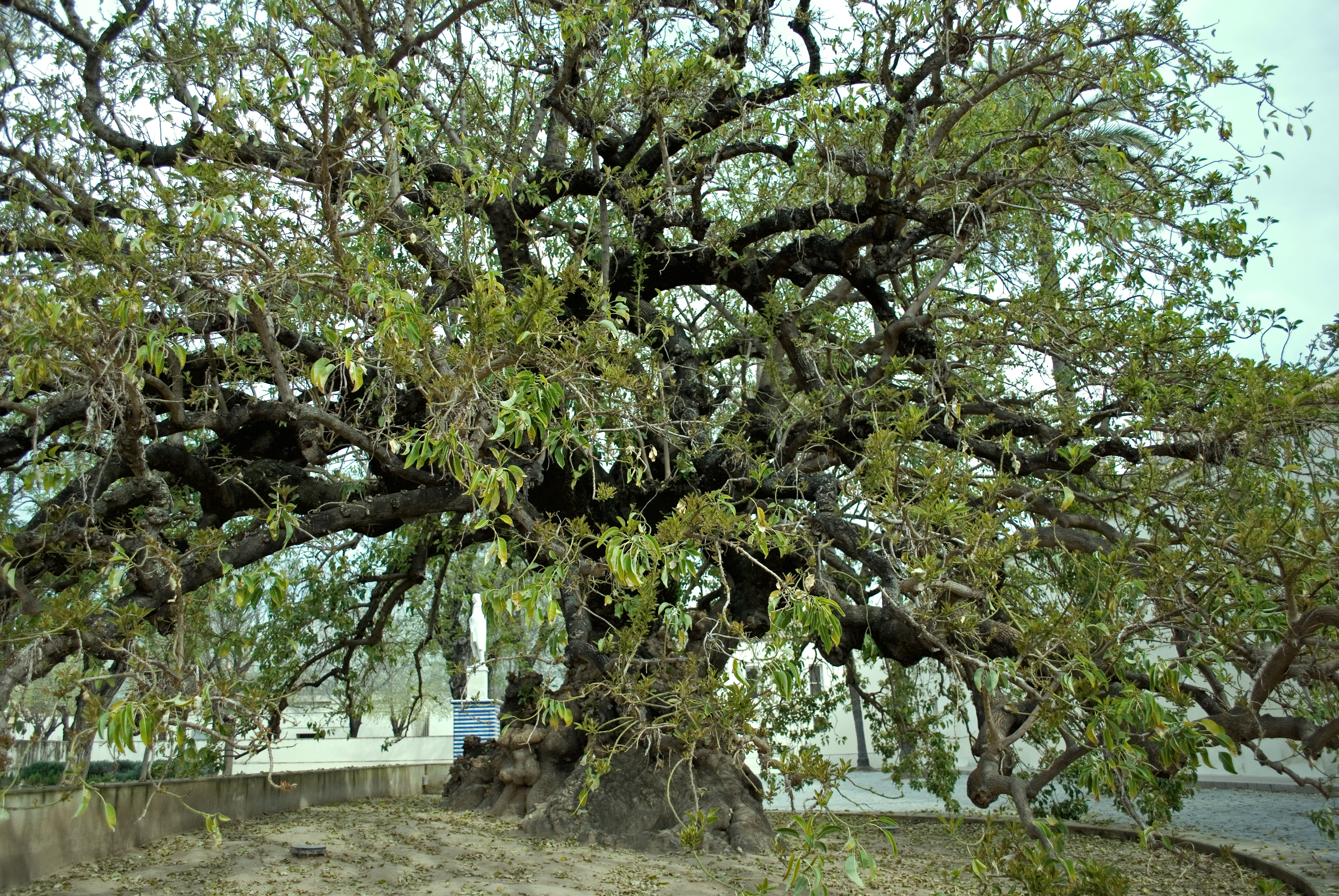
Although many species are herbaceous, P. dioica forms a substantial tree

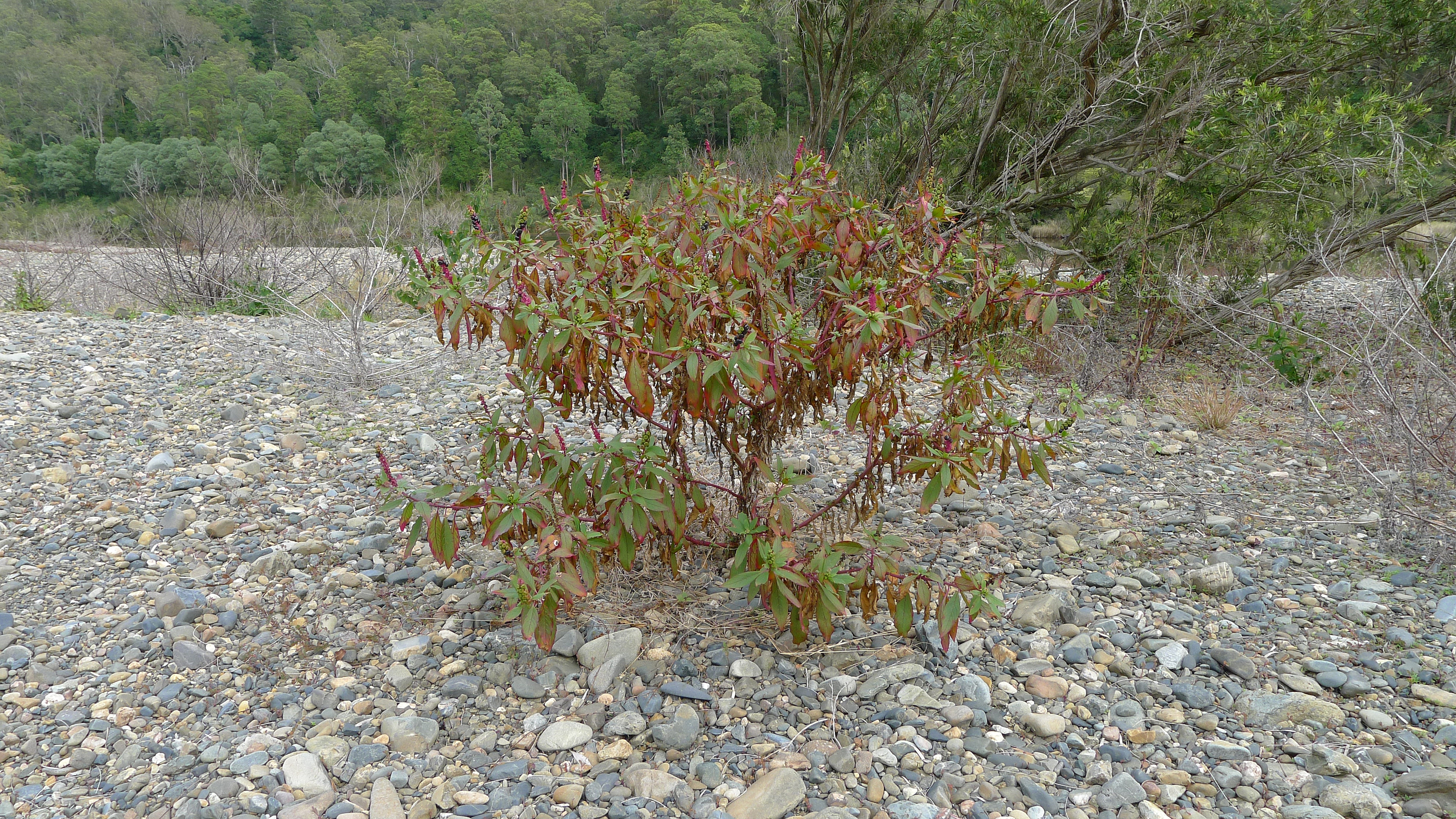
Nymboida National Park, NSW, Australia, August 2014.

The following species are accepted by one or more regional floras:

- Phytolacca acinosa Roxb. – Indian poke. Southern and eastern Asia (syn. P. esculenta Van Houtte, P. latbenia (Moq.) Walter). Black and Judziewicz report it in Dane County, Wisconsin in their 2008 and 2009 books (Wildflowers of Wisconsin and the Great Lakes Region. A Comprehensive Field Guide, first and 2nd editions. )
- Phytolacca americana L. – American pokeweed. North America (syn. P. decandra L.)
- Phytolacca australis Phil. – Western South America
- Phytolacca bogotensis Kunth – Tropical and subtropical South America (sometimes included in P. icosandra).
- Phytolacca chilensis Miers – central Chile (possibly synonymous with P. icosandra)
- Phytolacca dioica L. – Ombú. Subtropical South America.
- Phytolacca dodecandra L'Hér. – Eastern Africa, Madagascar (syn. P. abyssinica Hoffm.).
- Phytolacca heterotepala H.Walt. – Mexican pokeweed. Mexico.
- Phytolacca icosandra L. – Central and South America.
- Phytolacca japonica Makino – Eastern Asia (syn. P. hunanensis Hand.-Mazz., P. zhejiangensis W.T.Fan).
- Phytolacca octandra L. – Red inkplant. Subtropical and tropical regions worldwide (sometimes included in P. icosandra).
- Phytolacca polyandra Batalin – Central and southwest China (syn. P. clavigera W.W.Smith).
- Phytolacca pruinosa Fenzl – Levantine Pokeweed. Southern Turkey, Cyprus, Lebanon and Syria.
- Phytolacca rivinoides Kunth & C.D.Bouché – Central and South America.
- Phytolacca sandwicensis Endl. – Hawaiian Pokeweed. Hawaii.
- Phytolacca thyrsiflora Fenzl ex J.A.Schmidt – Northern South America.
- Phytolacca weberbaueri H.Walt. – Yumbi. Peru.

=== Formerly placed here ===
- Leea asiatica (L.) Ridsdale (as P. asiatica L.)
- Terminalia catappa L. (as P. javanica Osbeck)

== Ecology ==
Members of the genus Phytolacca can be found on every continent except Antarctica, though it is introduced in Europe and Australasia.

Phytolacca is known to be dispersed by birds and box turtles.

The ombú (Phytolacca dioica) grows as a tree on the pampas of South America and is one of the few providers of shade on the open grassland. It is a symbol of Uruguay, Argentina and gaucho culture. P. weberbaueri from Peru also grows to tree size. Both species have massively buttressed bases to their trunks, and very soft wood with a high water storage capacity which makes them resistant to grass fires and drought.

In the Pacific Northwest of North America, pokeweed is an invasive species.

== Uses ==
Phytolacca americana (American pokeweed, pokeweed, poke) is used as a folk medicine and as food, although all parts of it must be considered toxic unless, as folk recipes claim, it is "properly prepared." The root is never eaten and cannot be made edible. Poke salad ('poke salat') is considered part of traditional southern U.S. cuisine, where it is cooked three times in three changes of boiling water to remove some of the harmful components. Toxic constituents which have been identified include the alkaloids phytolaccine and phytolaccotoxin, as well as a glycoprotein.

== Fossil record ==
A Phytolacca-like fossil has been described from the Upper Cretaceous (late Campanian) Cerro del Pueblo Formation, Coahuila, Mexico, it is a permineralized multiple infructescence composed of berries with six locules, each containing a single seed with a curved embryo developed in a curved ovule with pendulous placentation, a berry anatomy that is similar to that of the genus Phytolacca. Though this new plant from Coahuila shares reproductive characters with Phytolacca, the constant number (six) of carpels per fruit and pendulous placentation support the recognition of a new genus, Coahuilacarpon phytolaccoides.
