= Phytolacca pruinosa =

Scientific classification
- Kingdom: Plantae
- Clade: Tracheophytes
- Clade: Angiosperms
- Clade: Eudicots
- Order: Caryophyllales
- Family: Phytolaccaceae
- Genus: Phytolacca
- Species: P. pruinosa

Binomial name
- Phytolacca pruinosa Fenzl

Species of flowering plant

Phytolacca pruinosa, the Levantine pokeweed, is a species of plant in the Phytolaccaceae family. It is a perennial bearing green flowers which become red on maturity. Fruits are black berries.

== Habitat ==
Roadsides, dry rocky hillsides and forest clearings; 3000–5600 feet altitude; flowers from April to July.

== Distribution ==
Southern Turkey, Syria, Lebanon and in the Troödos Mountains of Cyprus.
