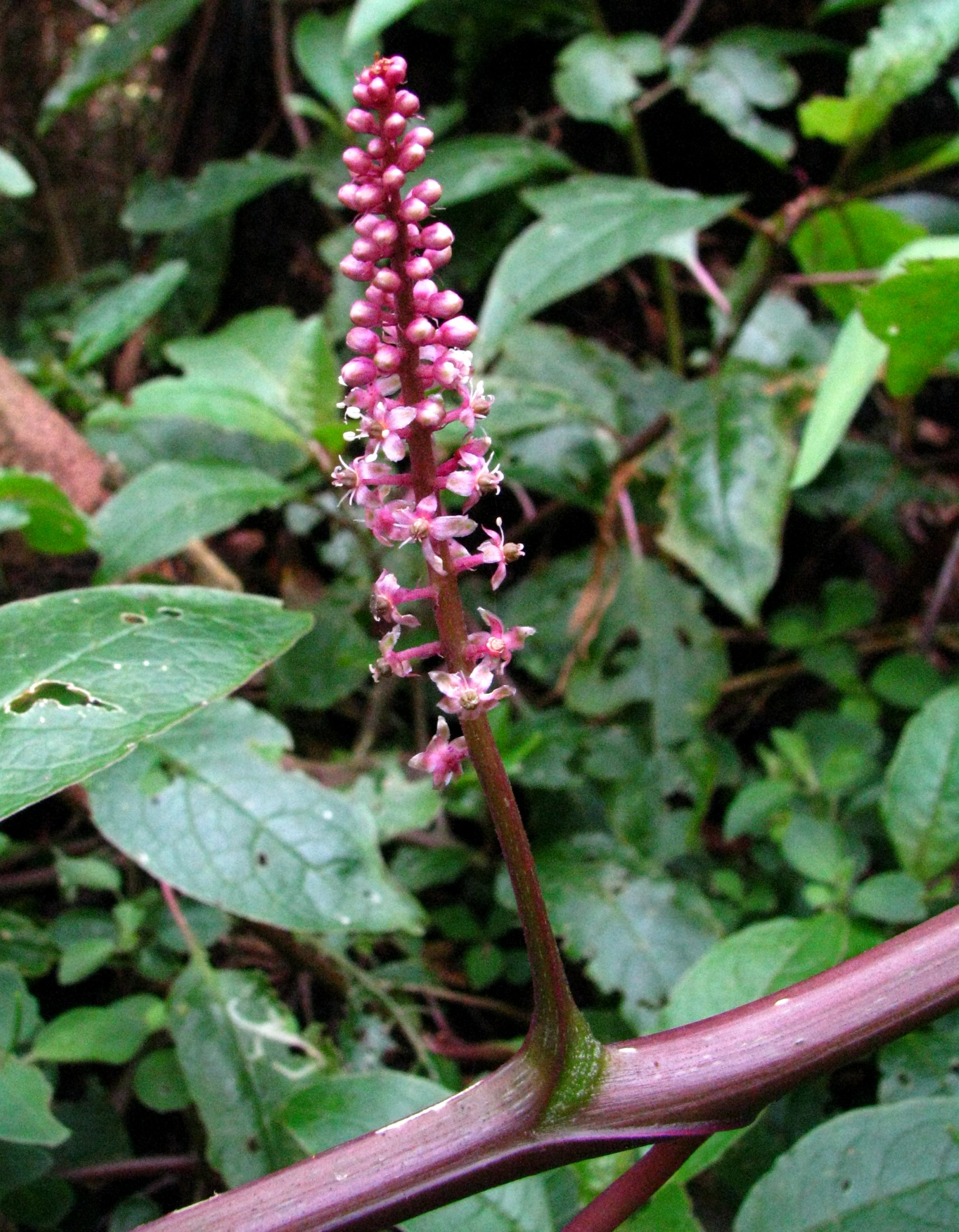

Conservation status
- Imperiled (NatureServe)

Scientific classification
- Kingdom: Plantae
- Clade: Embryophytes
- Clade: Tracheophytes
- Clade: Spermatophytes
- Clade: Angiosperms
- Clade: Eudicots
- Order: Caryophyllales
- Family: Phytolaccaceae
- Genus: Phytolacca
- Species: P. sandwicensis

Binomial name
- Phytolacca sandwicensis Endl.

= Phytolacca sandwicensis =

Species of flowering plant

Phytolacca sandwicensis, also known as Hawai'i pokeweed, is a member of the Phytolaccaceae family and is a flowering and fruit bearing species endemic to the Hawaiian Islands, where it is found on Kauaʻi, Oʻahu, Molokaʻi, Maui, and Hawaiʻi. Locally it is referred to as pōpolo kū mai and/or pōpolo. Pōpolo itself is a term for any Solanum species, which its berries resemble.

The genus Phytolacca has about 25 different species within it. They are commonly found in North America, South America, East Asia and New Zealand, with Phytolacca sandwicensis being the only species exclusively found in the Hawaiian Islands.

Hawai'i pokeweed can grow to a size of anywhere from 1 to greater than 3 feet in height and can spread to over 10 feet in diameter. This low and wide style of growing has made it an up-and-coming favorite for landscapers. The pokeweed has been used by the natives there for thousands of years. They would gather the berries of the plant and crush them to make a dark purplish dye for tattooing. The berries themselves are not consumable by humans or mammals, but birds have been able to adapt to combat the toxins which are emitted and do eat the fruits which aids in the process of seed dispersal. Phytolacca sandwicensis is often found in open areas or creek bottoms in wet forests at altitudes ranging from as low as 300 feet above sea level on up to 6500 feet above sea level.

== Description ==
Phytolacca sandwicensis is a non-woody plant which grows to a moderate height of over 3 feet tall and 10 feet across. The flowers which it produces range in color from dark pink, pink, to white typically. The flower is unique because it blooms on a spike of sorts known as inflorescence, which also bears the fruit of the plant. The fruit is typically dark purple in color. The pokeweed has green oval shaped leaves which can be either glabrous, meaning it has no fuzz or hairs, or they can be puberulent, meaning they have hair or fuzz.

== Habitat ==
Phytolacca sandwicensis is a terrestrial species endemic to the Hawaiian Islands of the Pacific Ocean. It is a rather rare plant to find in the wild. Hawai'i pokeweed can be found in open areas or stream beds within wet or mesic forests. It is capable of withstanding various elevation extremes ranging from around 300 feet above sea level to 6500 feet above sea level. Phytolacca sandwicensis requires a wet environment to survive with a moderate amount of sunlight exposure. It is capable of living in open areas with lots of light exposure, but for landscaping purposes it has been found that a limited amount of sunlight produces a more desirable color and shape. Hawai'i pokeweed also prefers to reside in a cinder or organic soil which is well drained.

== Pests and disease ==
Hawai'i pokeweed is susceptible to harm by ants, scale, aphids, and mealy bugs. Scale are tiny parasitic insects that attach themselves to plants and live off of the sap in the plant. The insects appear as tiny bumps and commonly are mistaken for a disease. Mealy bugs are very similar to scale in that they too feed off of the sap of the plant. They have a waxy white outer layer and accrue in bumps which resemble meal. Aphids again feed off the sap but they are simply insects. Ants cut off portions of leaves and bring them back to their colonies for consumption.

== Uses ==
=== Traditional uses ===
Traditionally the plant was used by the native islanders as a dye for tattooing. They found that crushing the berries created a desirable purple colored dye.

=== Modern uses ===
Today Phytolacca sandwicensis is starting to be used as a landscaping choice. The low stature and brilliant coloring combine with the unique berry covered flowering spike make it a potentially ideal plant for covering ground. The plant also seems to be able to respond well and recover from moderate trimming and pruning.

== Toxins ==
Phytolacca sandwicensis is poisonous to both humans and mammals. It is one of only a few poisonous plants on the Hawaiian Islands. The plant contains multiple triterpene toxins, but the main one is alkaloid phytolaccine. The result of consuming or ingesting the plant is intense digestive discomfort. Also the poison can have an adverse effect on the central nervous system. It also prohibits the creation of any new red blood cells. Birds are able to consume the berries of the plant and be ok. This is because the outer shell of the seeds is not penetrated during ingestion. This means the poison is not released and the bird is able to pass the seeds through its gut and excrete them. This process also aids in the dispersion process.

== Hybridization ==
Phytolacca sandwicensis has been documented to hybridize with Phytolacca octandra in locations where both species occur. Phytolacca octandra was introduced to the Hawaiian Islands (where it was first documented in 1910) from the Neotropics and this species has now been documented on Kauaʻi, Oʻahu, Molokaʻi, Lānaʻi, and Maui. The hybridization between P. sandwicensis and P. octandra can make identification challenging in areas where these two species overlap.
