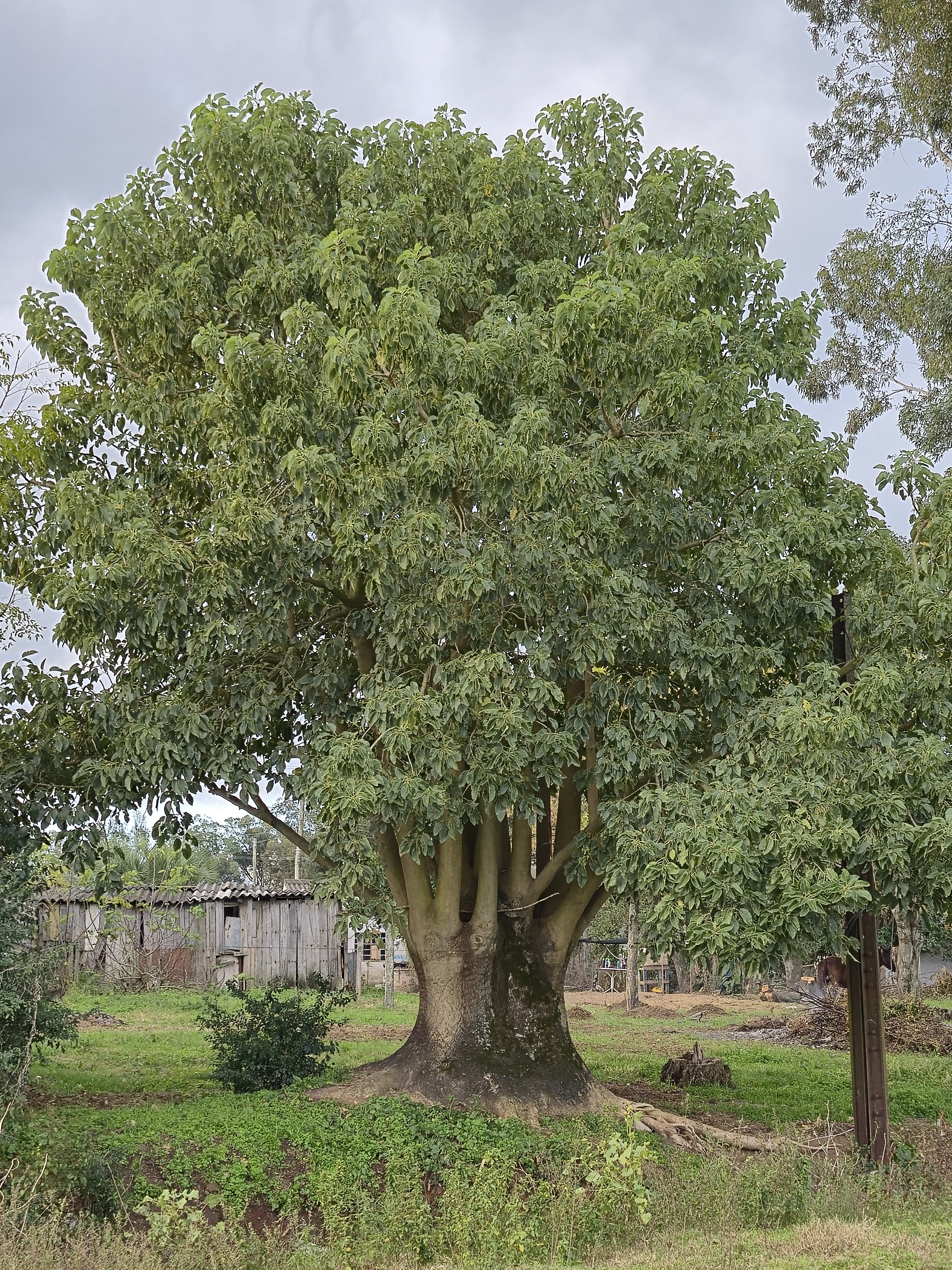
- Specimen in southern Brazil
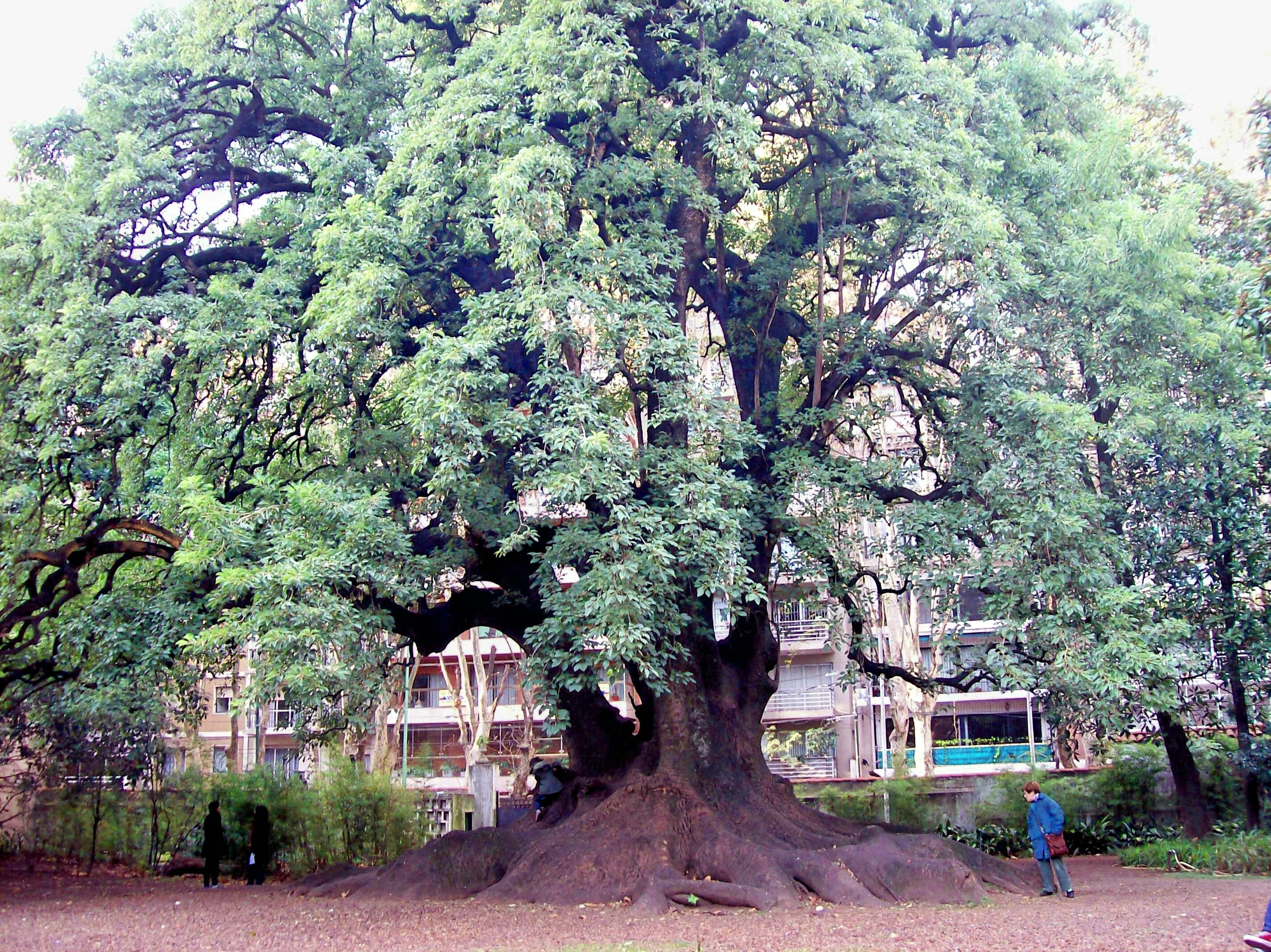
- A specimen, more than 80 years old, in Buenos Aires, Argentina

Scientific classification
- Kingdom: Plantae
- Clade: Embryophytes
- Clade: Tracheophytes
- Clade: Spermatophytes
- Clade: Angiosperms
- Clade: Eudicots
- Order: Caryophyllales
- Family: Phytolaccaceae
- Genus: Phytolacca
- Species: P. dioica

Binomial name
- Phytolacca dioica L.

Synonyms
- Pircunia dioica Moq. Maria-molle

= Phytolacca dioica =

Species of tree

Phytolacca dioica, commonly known as ombú in Spanish and umbu in Portuguese, is a massive evergreen tree in the pokeweed family Phytolaccaceae, native to the Pampas of South America. As its specific epithet suggests, it is dioecious, with male and female flowers on separate plants. The flowers are pollinated by the butterfly Doxocopa laurentia. It has an umbrella-like canopy that spreads to a diameter of 12 to 15 m (39 to 49 ft) and can attain a height of 12 to 18 m (39 to 59 ft). This upper growth springs up from a tuberous caudex, which can reach up to 14 m (46 ft) girth. Because it is derived from herbaceous ancestors, its trunk consists of anomalous secondary thickening rather than true wood. As a result, the ombú grows fast but its wood is soft and spongy enough to be cut with a knife. These properties have led it to be used in the art of bonsai, as it is easily manipulated to create the desired effect. Since the sap is poisonous, the ombú is not grazed by cattle and is immune to locusts and other pests. For similar reasons, the leaves are sometimes used as a laxative or purgative. It is a symbol of Uruguay, Rio Grande do Sul and Argentina, and of gaucho culture, as its canopy is quite distinguishable from afar and provides comfort and shelter from sun and rain.

This tree is classified in the same genus as the North American pokeweed. The species is also cultivated in Southern California as a shade tree. Ombú has been declared as a minor invasive species (category 3) in South Africa, where it is widely planted.

== Gallery ==
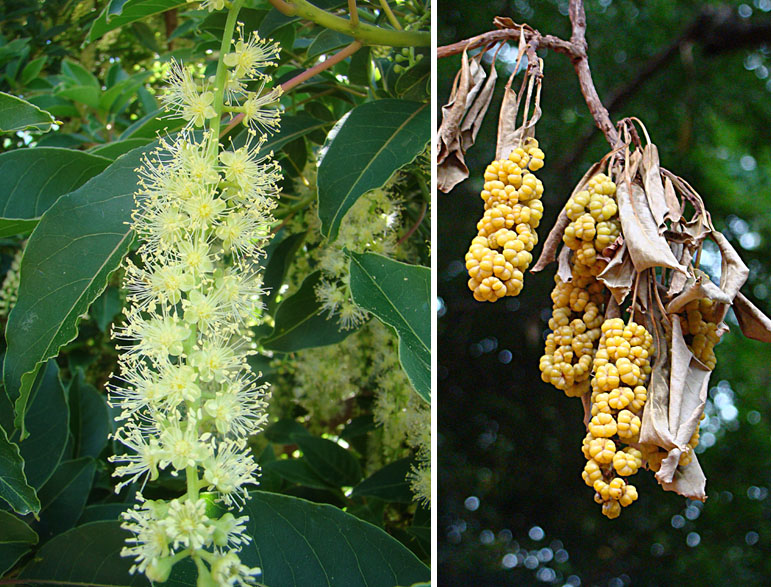
Inflorescence and fruit

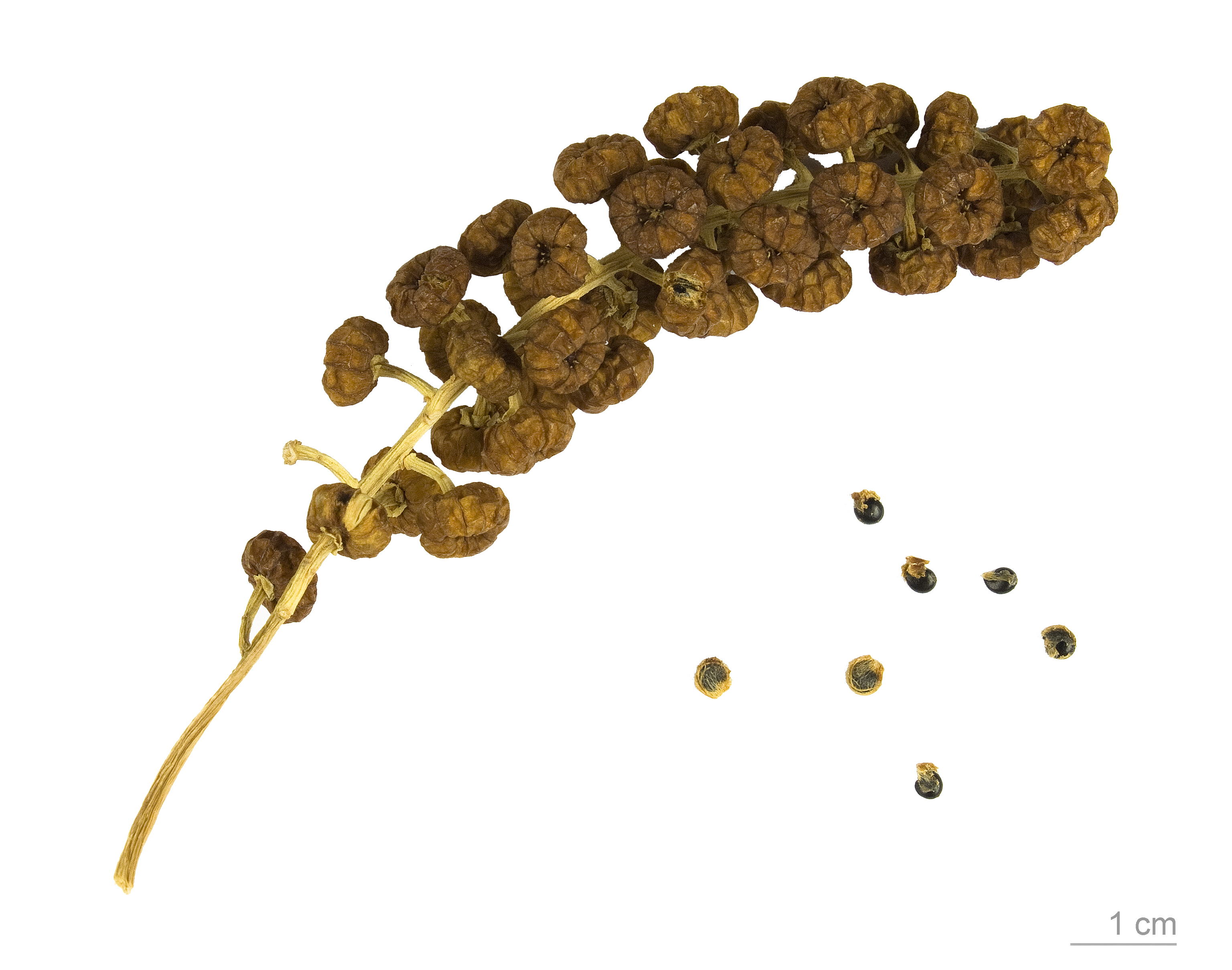
Infructescence and seeds – MHNT

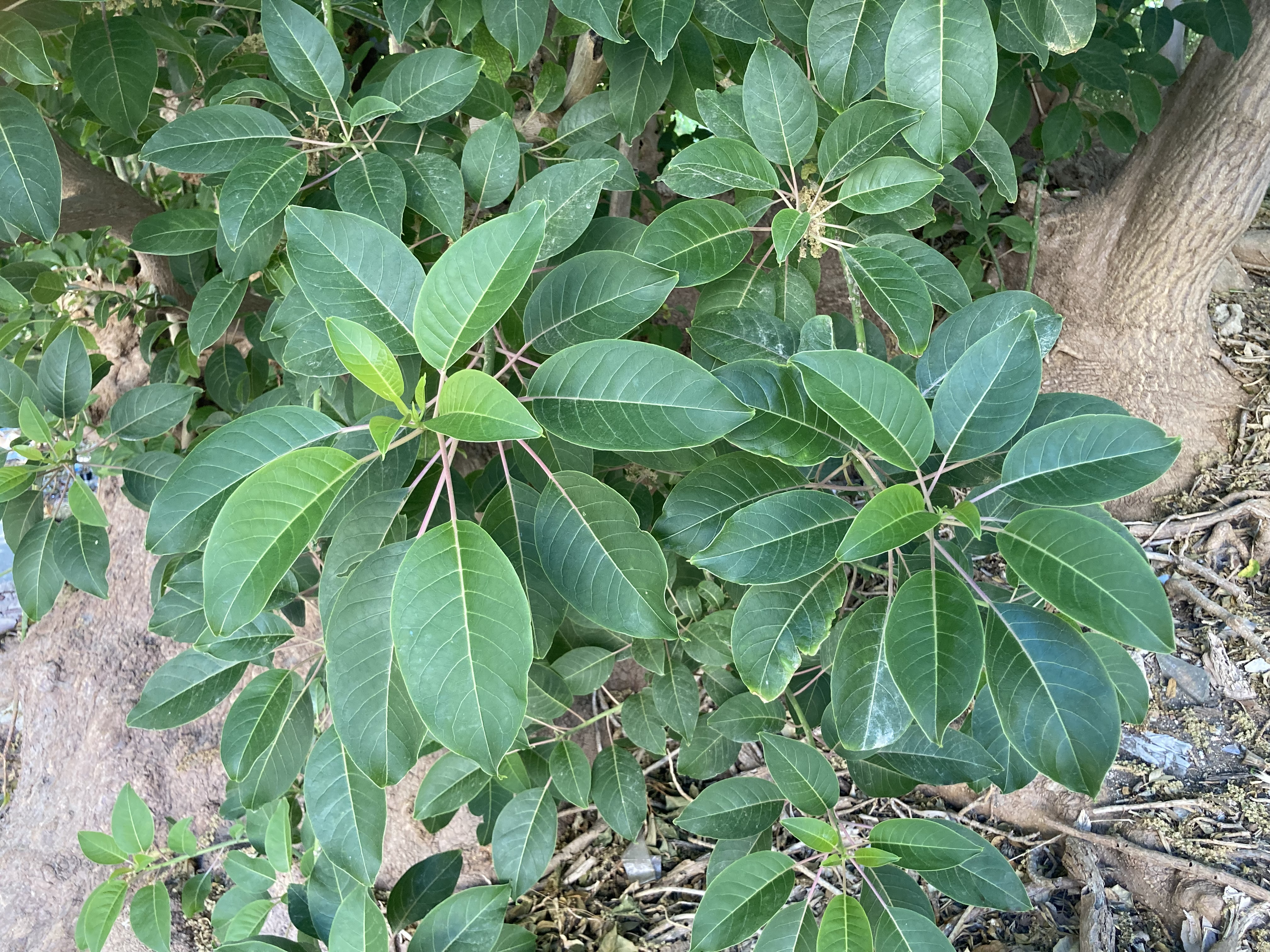
Detail of the leaves

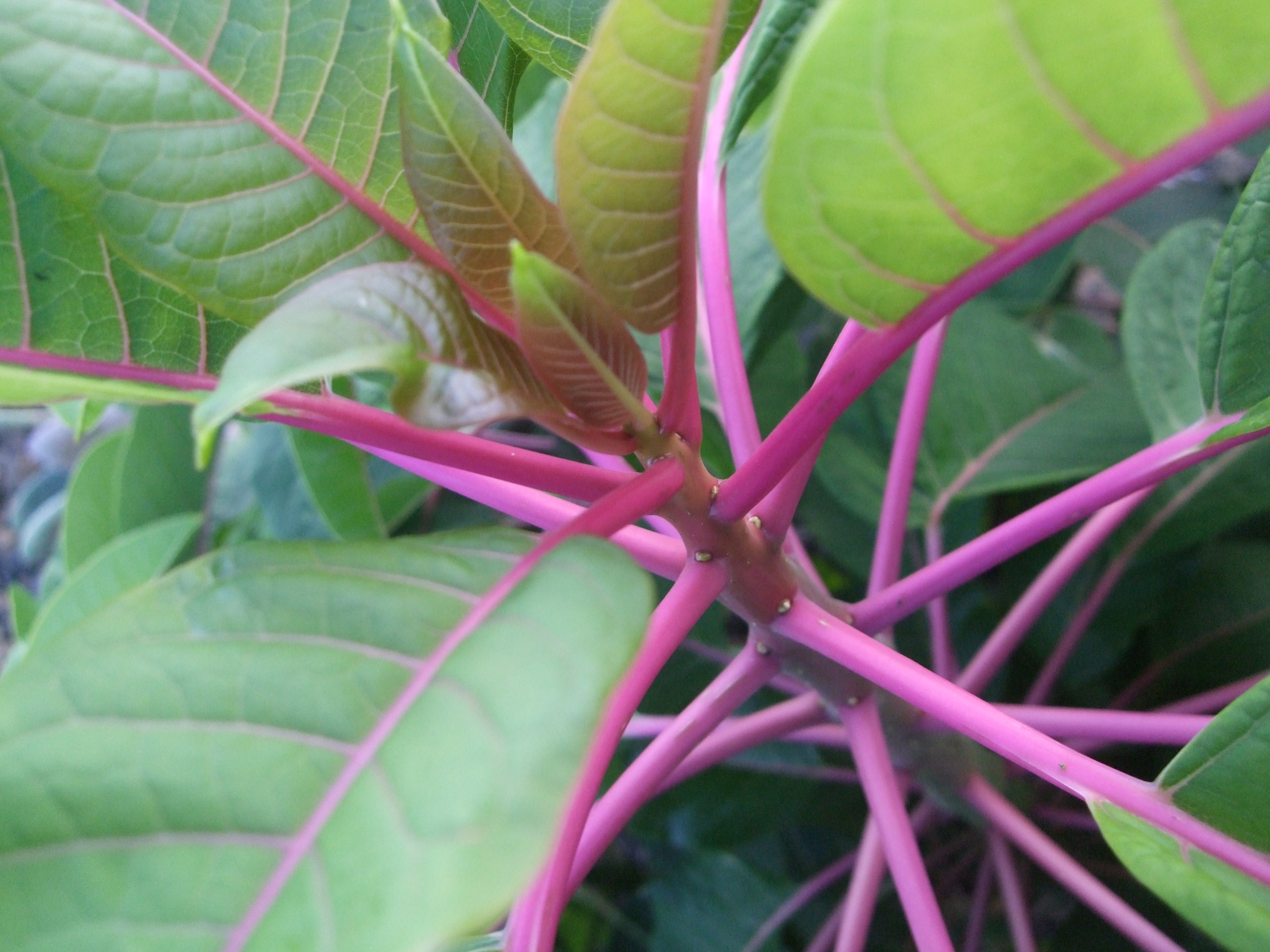
Magenta petioles and leaf venation
