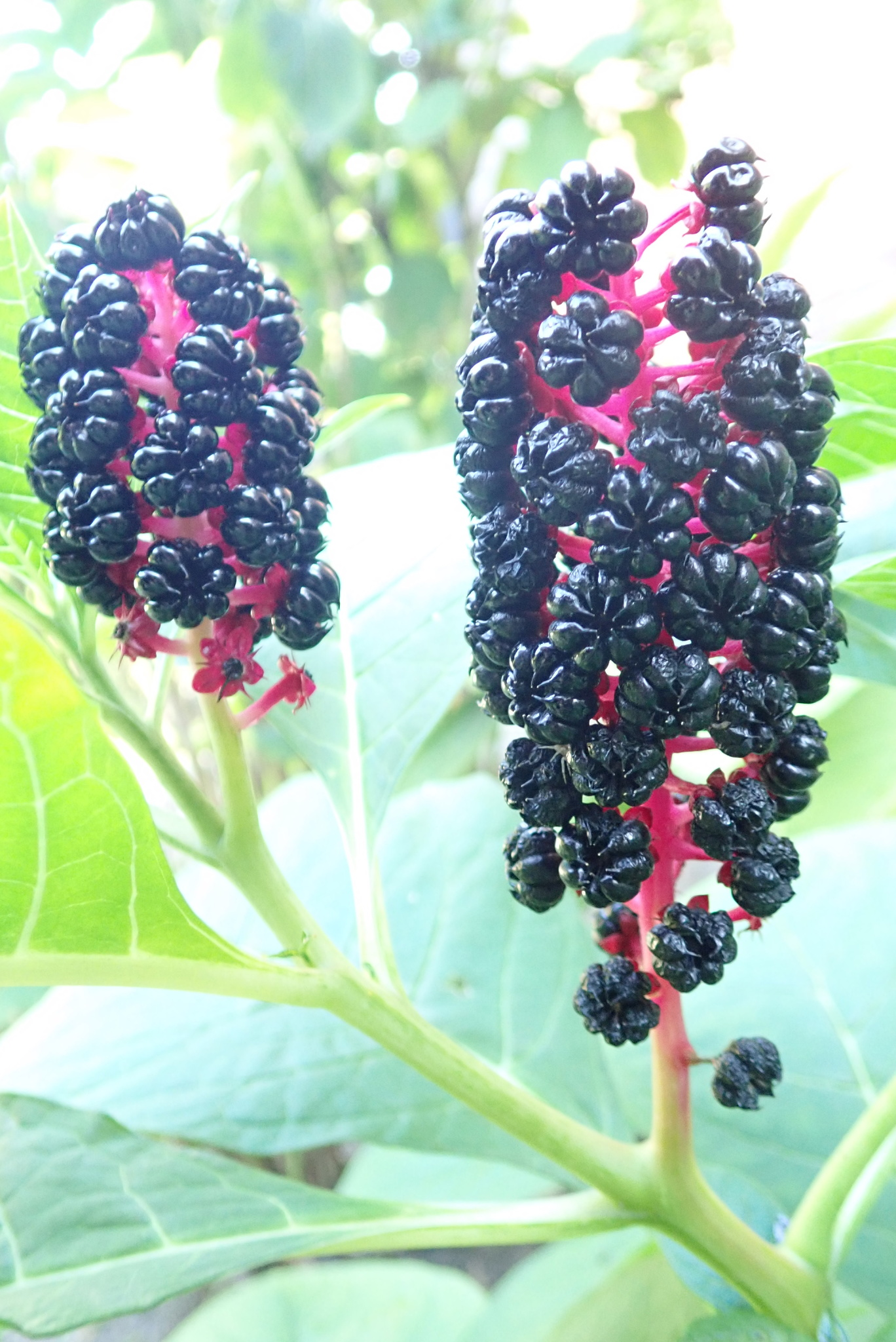

Scientific classification
- Kingdom: Plantae
- Clade: Embryophytes
- Clade: Tracheophytes
- Clade: Angiosperms
- Clade: Eudicots
- Order: Caryophyllales
- Family: Phytolaccaceae
- Genus: Phytolacca
- Species: P. acinosa

Binomial name
- Phytolacca acinosa Roxb.

Synonyms
- Phytolacca esculenta Van Houtte; Phytolacca kaempferi A.Gray; Phytolacca pekinensis Hance; Pircunia esculenta (Van Houtte) Moq.; Sarcoca acinosa (Roxb.) Skalický; Sarcoca esculenta (Van Houtte) Skalický

= Phytolacca acinosa =

Species of plant

Phytolacca acinosa, the Indian pokeweed, is a species of flowering plant in the family Phytolaccaceae. It is native to temperate eastern Asia; the Himalayas, most of China, Vietnam to Japan, and has been widely introduced to Europe. The species was originally described by William Roxburgh in 1814.

== Description ==
Raphides occur profusely in at least the leaves, young flowers, buds, spikes and bracts of at least P. a. var. venosa.

== Range ==
When the species was originally described it was considered a plant located to Nepal. Currently, the plant is considered native to countries surrounding the Himalayas and introduced to large parts of Europe and parts of the United States (Wisconsin).

== Ecology ==
Indian pokeweed is a hyperaccumulator for manganese.

== Toxicity ==
All parts of the plant are toxic to human and mammals, with reported poisoning cases. This is due to the presence of saponins and alkaloids (phytolaccatoxin and phytolaccagenin).

== Uses ==
=== As a wild food ===
The young shoots of Indian pokeweed are cooked and eaten by the Gurung people of western Nepal. They are harvested in June and July.

=== In traditional medicine ===
Used in traditional Indian and Chinese medicine to treat various ailments and induce abortion.

=== In extracting heavy metals ===
Along with other species in its genus, Phytolacca acinosa has the potential to extract heavy metal from contaminated sites.

=== Other ===
It is also used as dye for food and textile.

== Similar species (look-a-likes) ==
Due to overlap in diagnostic features Phytolacca acinosa can be confused with Phytolacca americana, Phytolacca latbenia or Phytolacca polyandra.

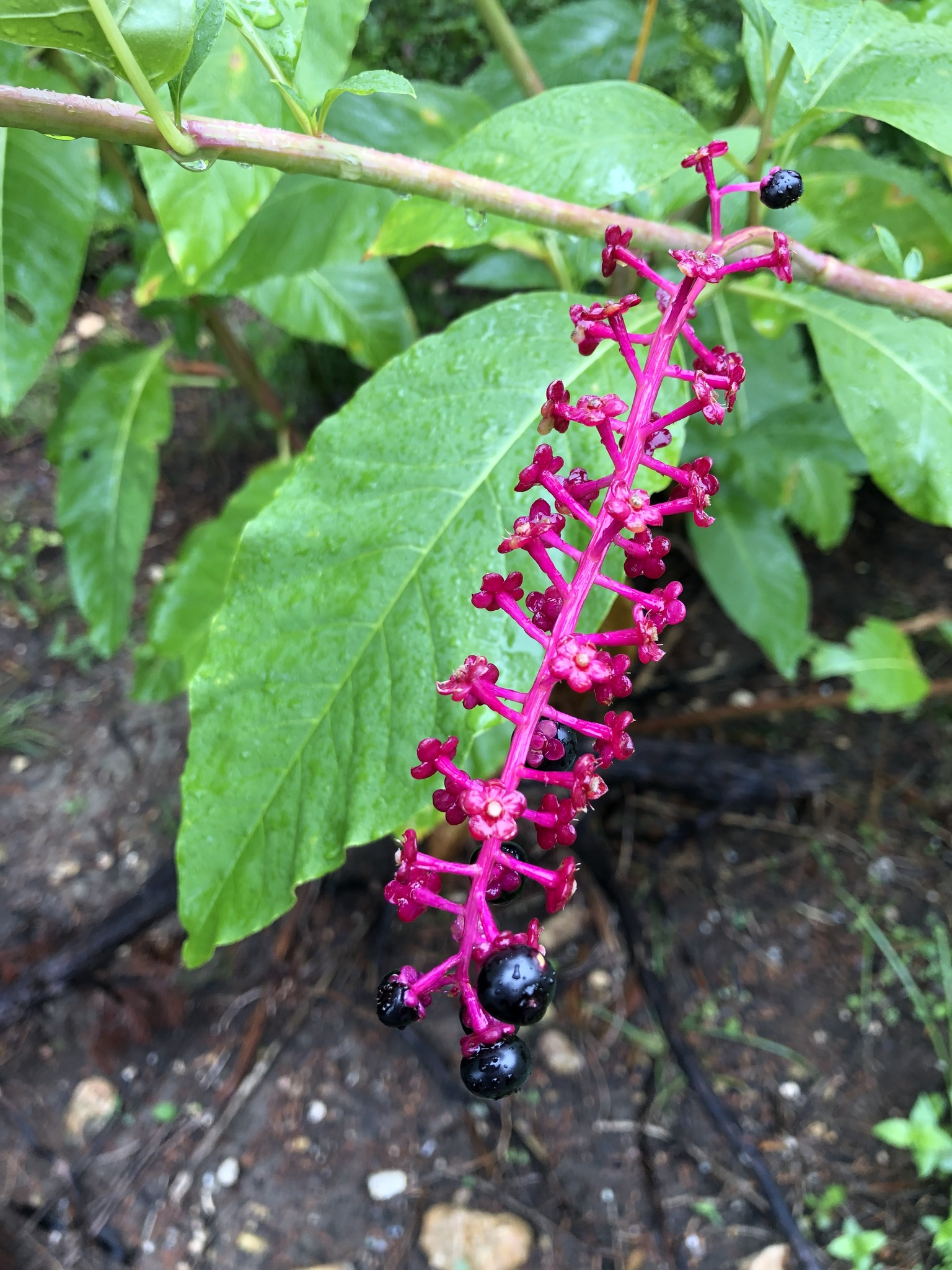
Phytolacca americana

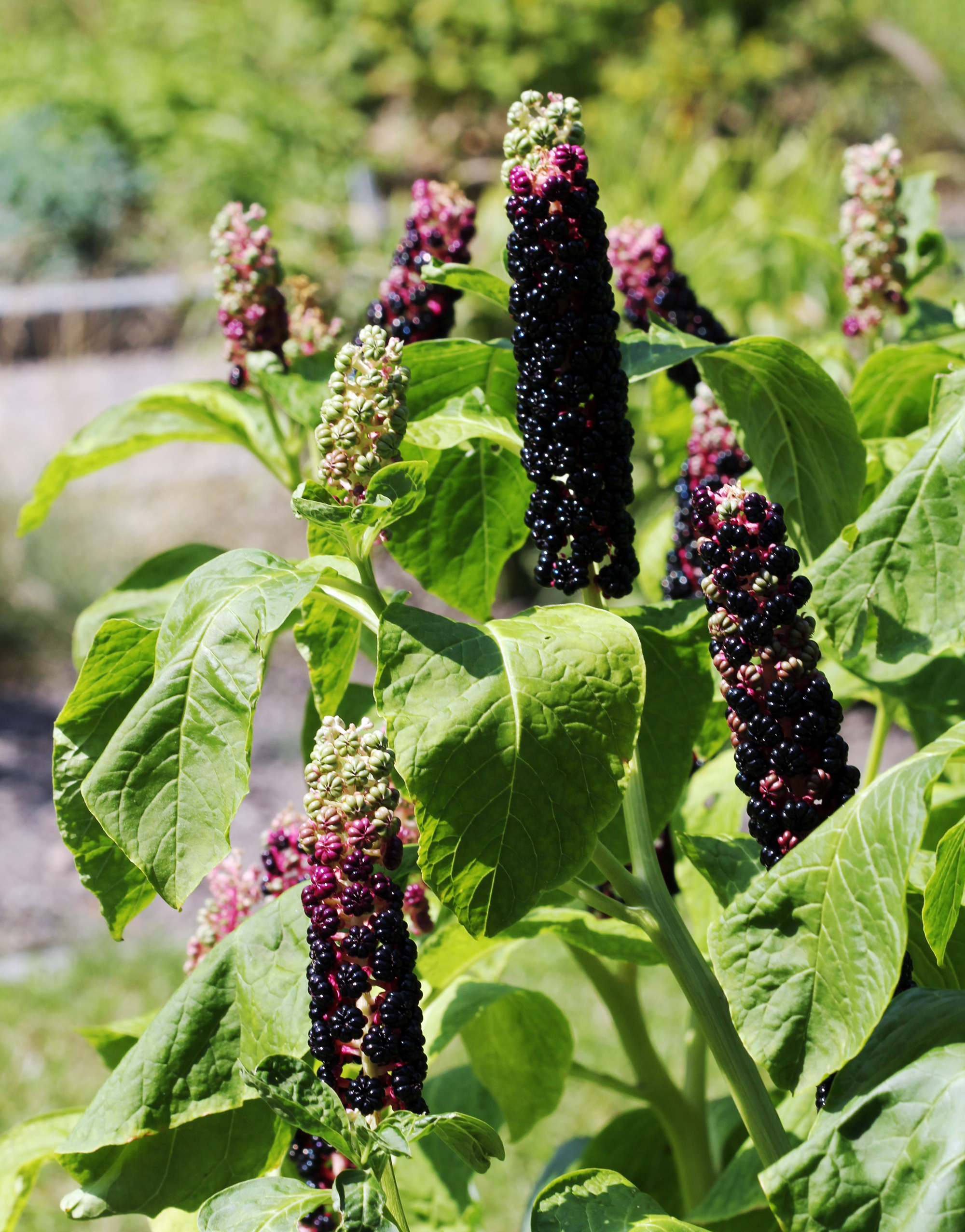
Phytolacca polyandra

The root of Phytolacca acinosa can also be mistaken for ginseng root.

== Natural products ==
Phytolacca acinosa is the source of four flavones, four oleanane derivatives, and six triterpenoid saponins.

=== Flavones ===
- Cochliophilin A
- Cochliophilin B
- 6-methoxy-7-hydroxy flavone
- 6,7-methylenedioxy-4-hydroxypeltogynan-7′-one

=== Triterpenoid saponins ===
- esculentoside A
- esculentoside B
- esculentoside C
- esculentoside D
- esculentoside H
- esculentoside T

== Bibliography ==
- Gulliver, George (1864). "Observations on Raphides and other Crystals". The Annals and Magazine of Natural History, Including Zoology, Botany, and Geology. Third Series. 14: 250–252.
