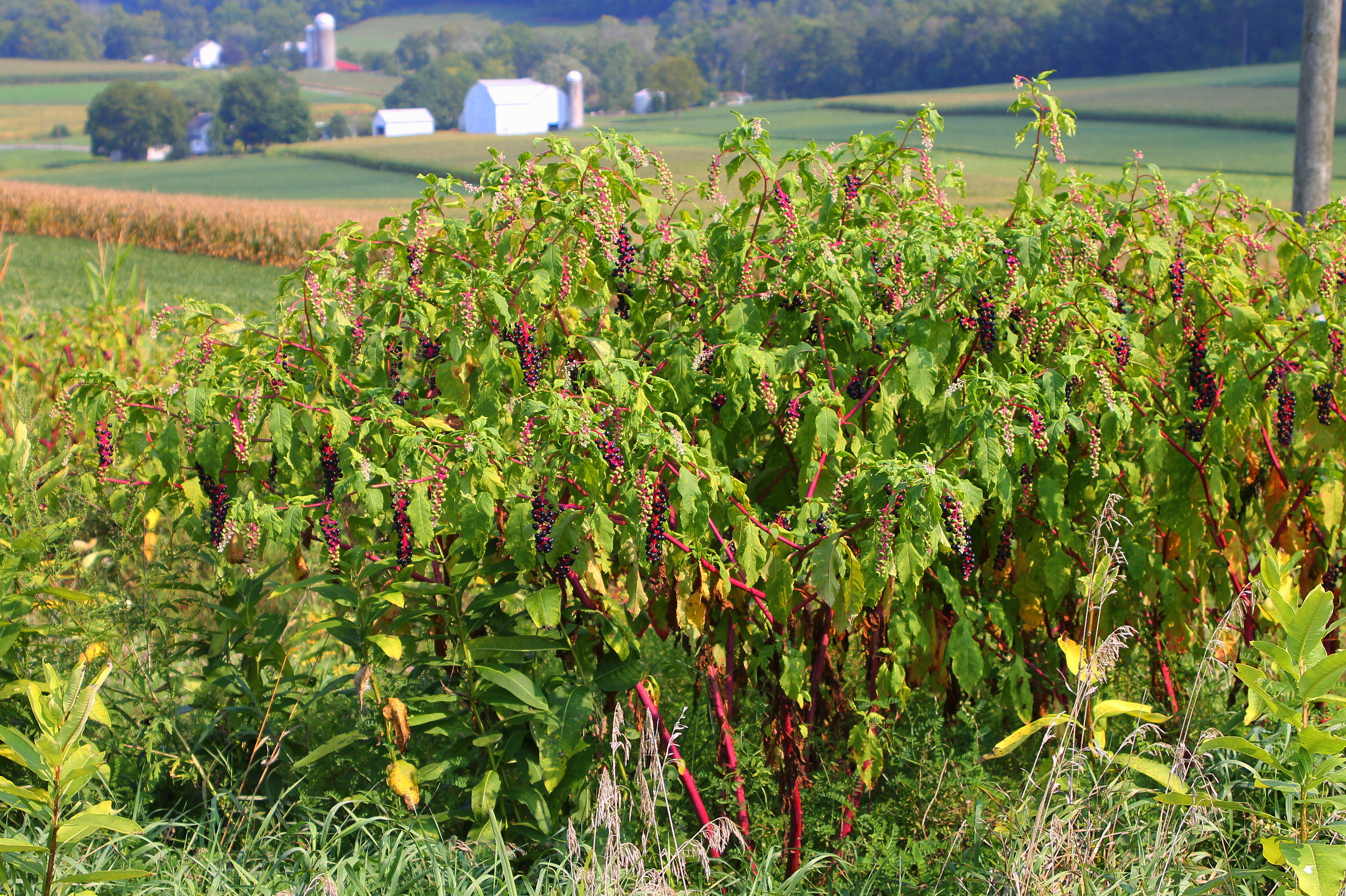

Conservation status
- Secure (NatureServe)

Scientific classification
- Kingdom: Plantae
- Clade: Tracheophytes
- Clade: Angiosperms
- Clade: Eudicots
- Order: Caryophyllales
- Family: Phytolaccaceae
- Genus: Phytolacca
- Species: P. americana

Binomial name
- Phytolacca americana L.

Synonyms
- Phytolacca decandra (L.); Phytolacca rigida (Small)

= Phytolacca americana =

Species of flowering plant

Phytolacca americana, also known as American pokeweed, pokeweed, polk salad, poke sallet, pokeberry, dragonberries, pigeonberry weed, and inkberry, is a poisonous, herbaceous, perennial plant in the pokeweed family Phytolaccaceae. This pokeweed grows 1 to 3 metres (4 to 10 ft). It has simple leaves on green to red or purplish stems and a large, white taproot. The flowers are green to white, followed by berries, which ripen through red to purple to almost black and are a food source for songbirds such as gray catbird, northern mockingbird, northern cardinal, and brown thrasher, as well as other birds and some small nonavian animals (i.e., for species that are unaffected by its mammalian toxins).

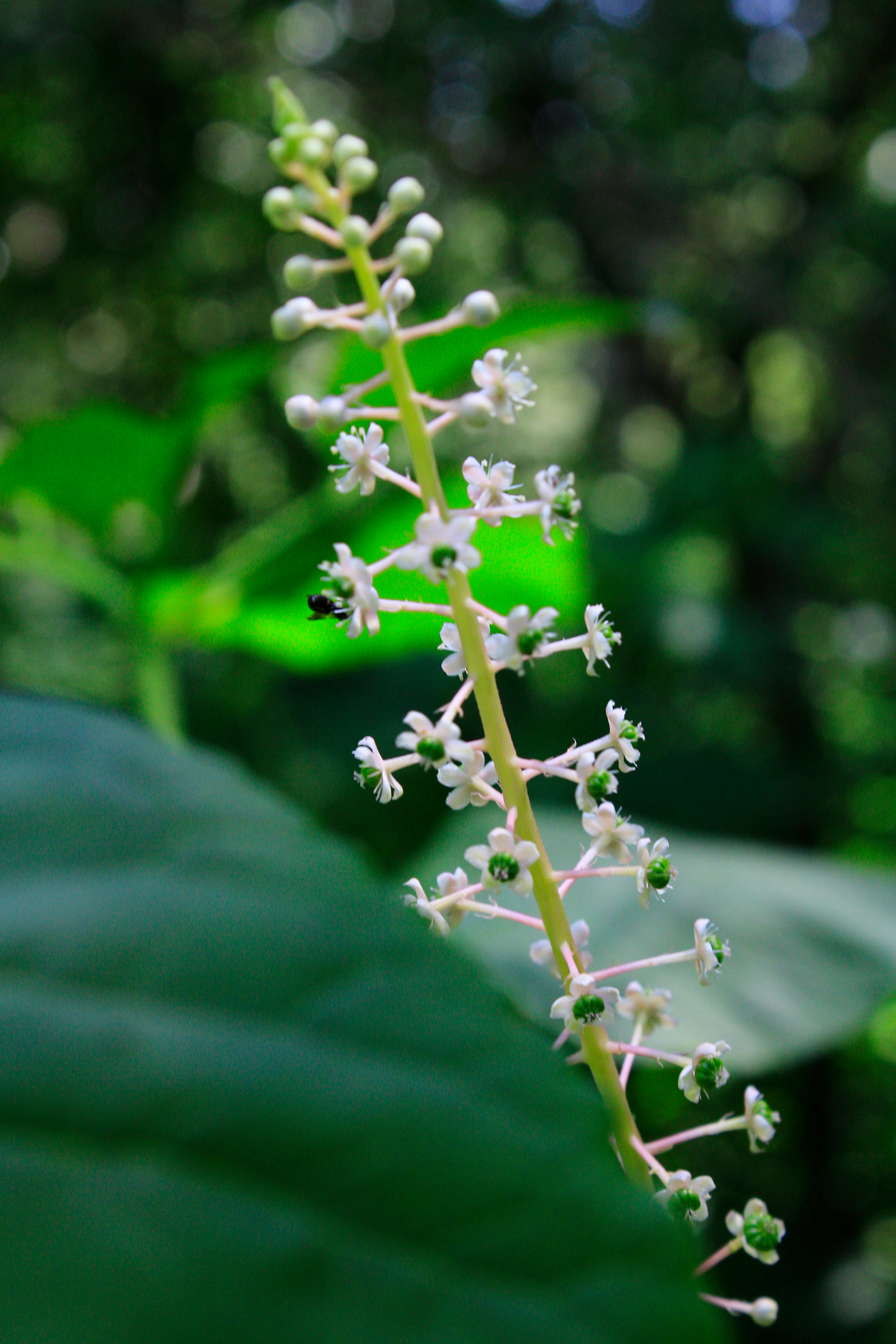
American pokeweed (lat. Phytolacca americana)

Pokeweed is native to eastern North America, the Midwest, and the South, with more scattered populations in the Far West, where it was introduced. It is also naturalized in parts of Europe and Asia. It is considered a pest species by farmers. Pokeweed is poisonous to humans, dogs, and livestock. In spring and early summer, shoots and leaves (not the root) are edible with proper cooking (hence the common name "poke sallet"), but later in the summer, they become poisonous, and the berries are also poisonous. It is used as an ornamental in horticulture, and it provokes interest for the variety of its natural products (toxins and other classes), for its ecological role, its historical role in traditional medicine, and for some utility in biomedical research (e.g., in studies of pokeweed mitogen). In the wild, it is easily found growing in pastures, recently cleared areas and woodland openings, edge habitats such as along fencerows, and in wastelands.

== Description ==
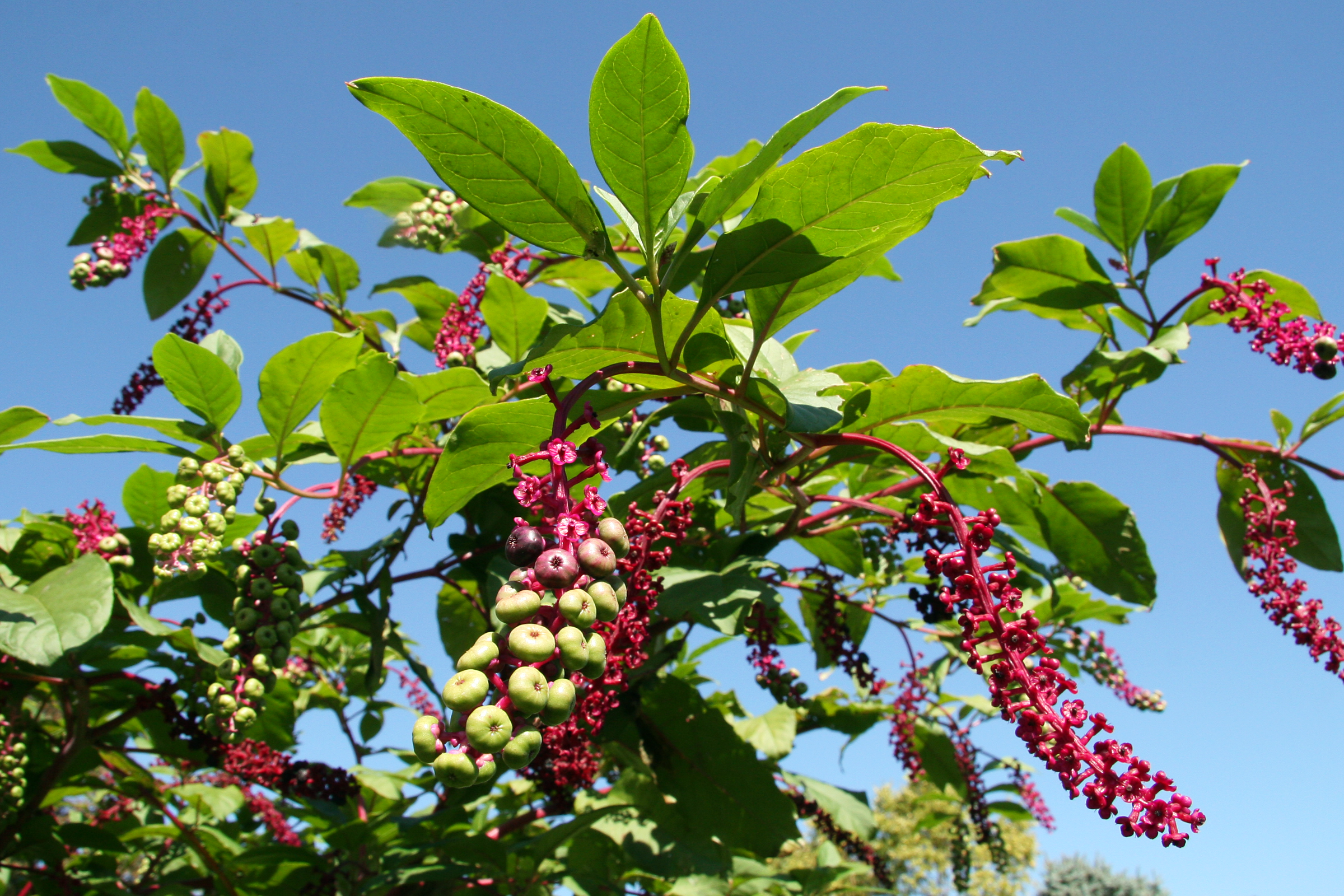
Pokeweed berries

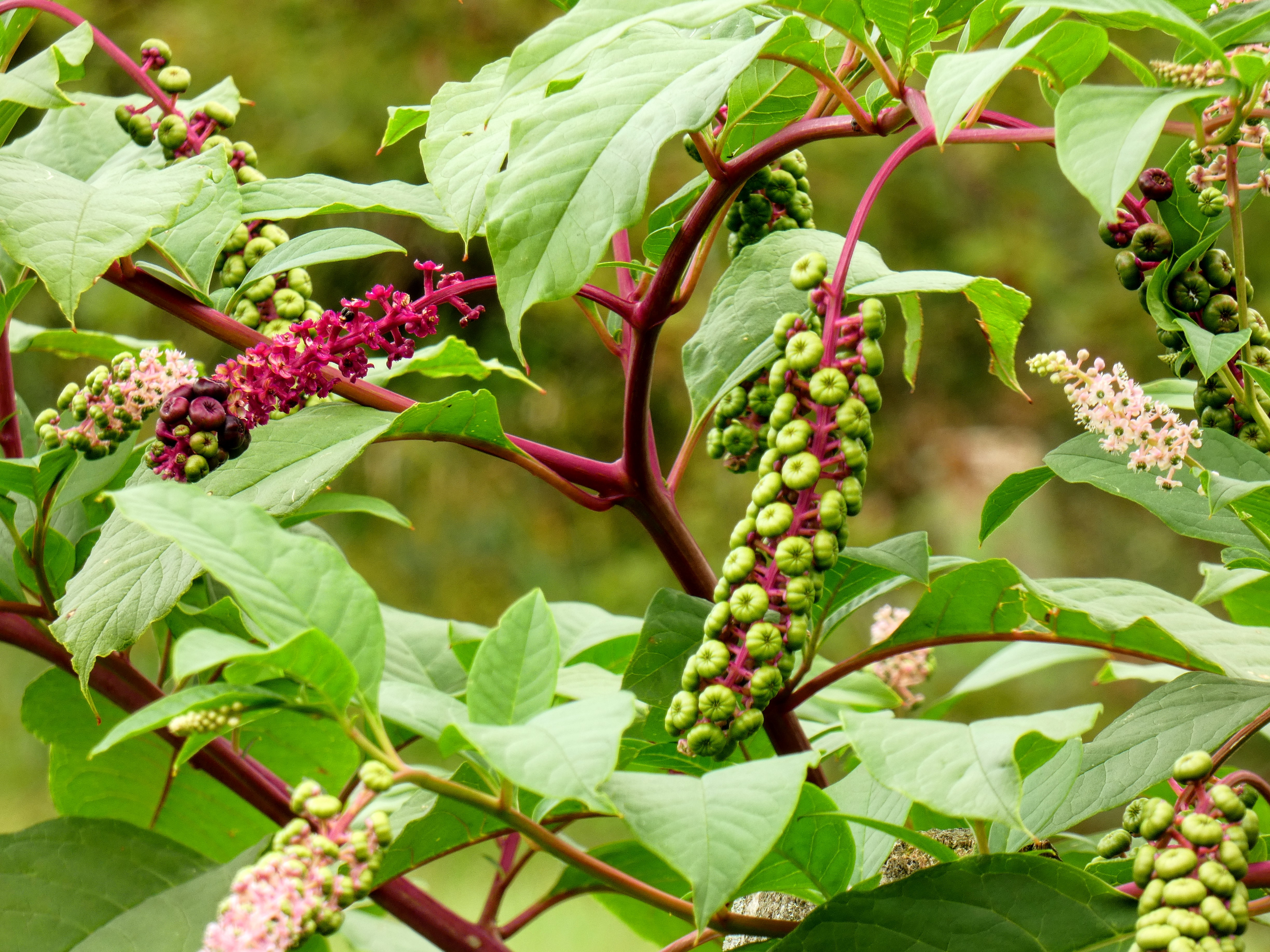

Pokeweed is a member of the family Phytolaccaceae, and is a large herbaceous perennial plant, growing up to 2.5 m (8 ft) in height over the course of a summer. One to several branches grow from the crown of a thick, white, fleshy taproot; Michael D. K. Owen describes the branches as "stout, smooth, [and] green to somewhat purplish". Simple, entire leaves with long petioles are alternately arranged along the stem.

Pokeweeds reproduce only by their large, glossy black, lens-shaped seeds, which are contained in a fleshy, 10-celled, purple-to-near-black berry that has crimson juice. The flowers are perfect, radially symmetrical, white or green, with four or five sepals and no petals. The flowers develop in elongated clusters termed racemes. The seeds have long viability, able to germinate after many years in the soil.

=== Morphology ===
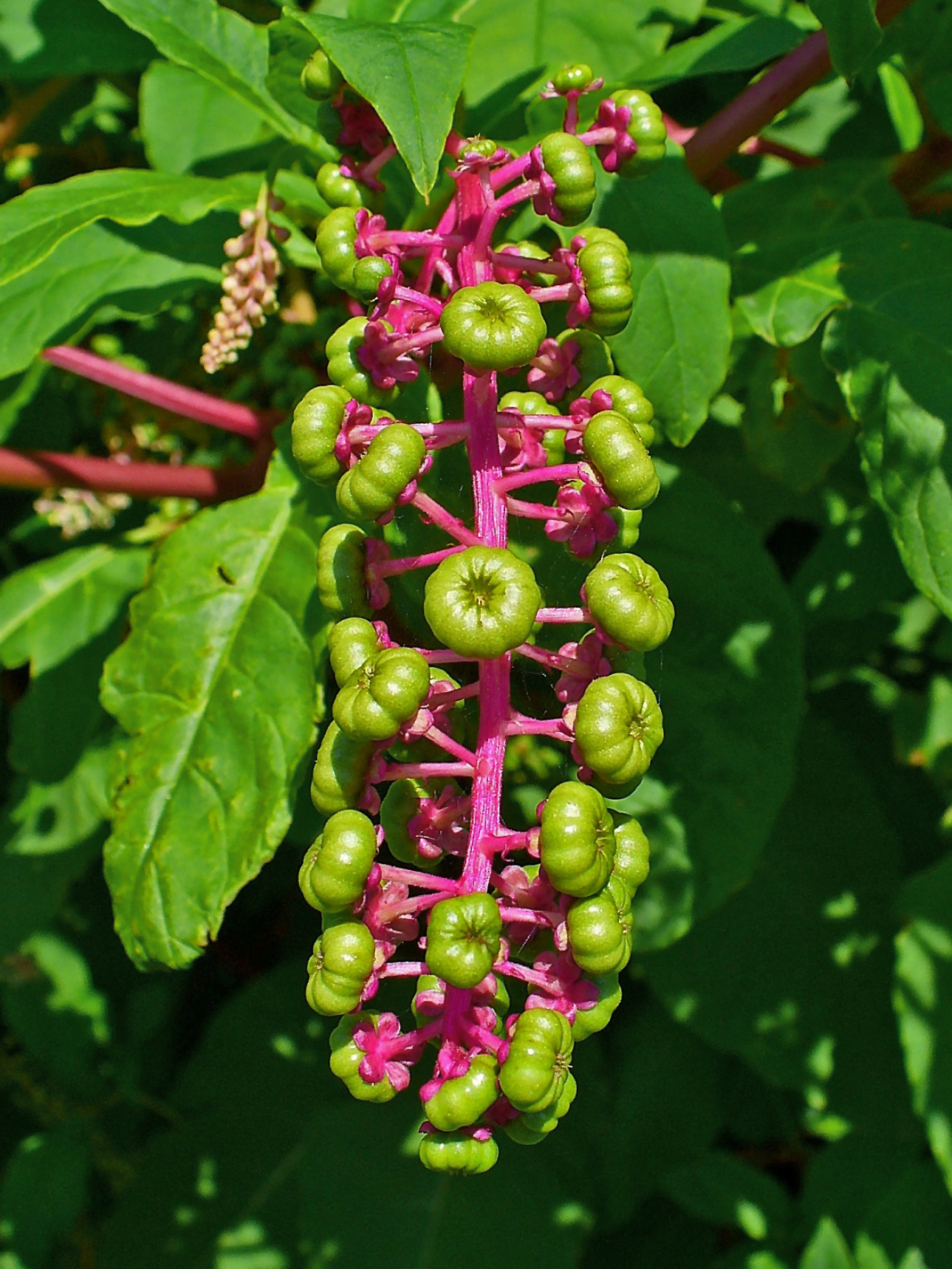
A cluster of unripe pokeweed berries

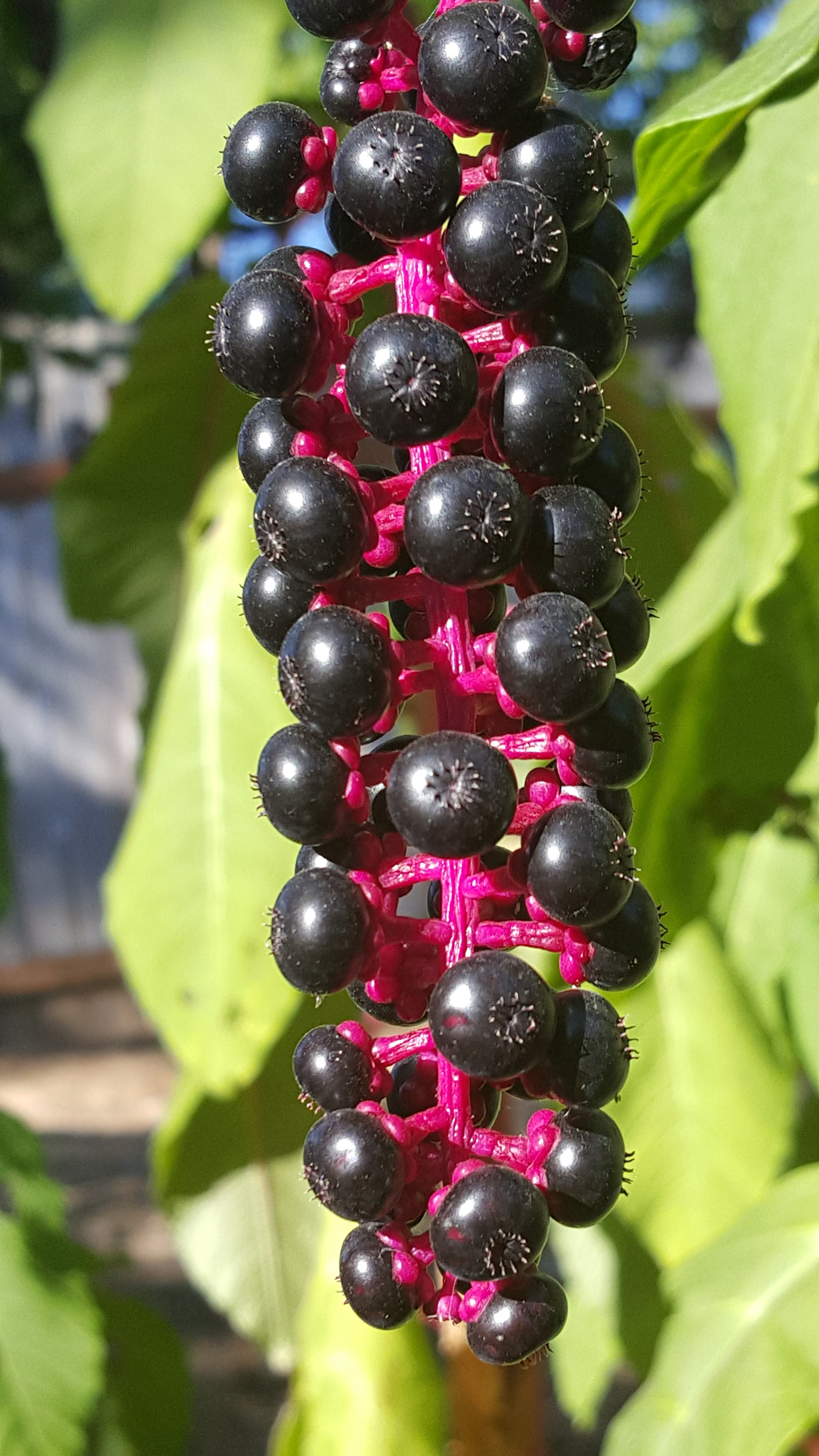
A cluster of ripe pokeweed berries

Plant Type: Perennial herbaceous plant which can reach a height of 3 m (10 ft) but is usually 1.2 to 2 m (4 to 6 1/2 ft). The plant must be a few years old before the root grows large enough to support this size. The stem is usually red late in the season. The plant has an upright, erect central stem early in the season, which changes to a spreading, horizontal form later with the weight of the berries. The plant dies back to the roots each winter. The stem has a chambered pith.

The leaves are alternate with coarse texture with moderate porosity. Leaves can reach 41 centimetres (16 inches) in length. Each leaf is entire and are medium green and smooth, with a distinct odor that many characterize as unpleasant.

The flowers have five regular parts with upright stamens and are up to 5 mm (1/4 in) wide. They have white, petal-like sepals without true petals, on white pedicels and peduncles in an upright or drooping raceme, which darken as the plant fruits. Blooms first appear in early summer and continue into early fall.

A shiny, dark purple berry is held in racemose clusters on pink pedicels with a pink peduncle. Pedicels without berries have a distinctive, rounded, five-part calyx. Fruits are round with a flat, indented top and bottom. Immature berries are green, turning white and then blackish purple.

Thick central taproot grows deep and spreads horizontally. Its growth is rapid, with a tan cortex, white pulp, and a moderate number of rootlets. Transversely cut root slices show concentric rings. The plant has no nitrogen-fixation ability.

=== Chemistry ===
Chemical structure of pokeberrygenin

The entire pokeweed plant contains triterpenes such as phytolaccagenin, jaligonic acid, phytolaccagenic acid (phytolaccinic acid), esculentic acid, and pokeberrygenin (in the berries), as well as the saponins phytolaccasides A, B, D, E, and G, and phytolaccasaponins B, E, and G (in the roots).

The roots also contain other triterpenoids such as oleanolic acid, α-spinasterol and its glucoside, α-spinasteryl-β-D-glucoside, and a palmityl-derivative, 6-palmytityl-α-spinasteryl-6-D-glucoside, as well as a similarly functionalized stigmasterol derivative, 6-palmityl-Δ7-stigmasterol-Δ-D-glucoside. Pokeweed berries also contain betalain pigments such as betanin and others. The leaves contain a number of common flavonols. Seeds of pokeweed contain the phenolic aldehyde caffeic aldehyde.

Pokeweed also contains lectins, such as pokeweed mitogen.

== Etymology ==
The generic name, Phytolacca, comes from the Greek words phyton ('plant') and lacca—the scarlet dye secreted by the Kerria lacca scale insect. The specific name americana denotes this plant as native to America. The common name "poke" is derived from puccoon, pocan, or poughkone (from an Algonquin name for the plant). Its berries were once used to make ink, hence its other sometimes-used common name, inkberry.

== Common names ==
Phytolacca americana or pokeweed is also known as pokeberry, poke root, Virginia poke (or simply poke), pigeonberry, inkberry, redweed, or red ink plant. When used in Chinese medicine, it is called chuíxù shānglù (垂序商陸).

As food, it is called poke sallet, or more commonly poke salad, sometimes spelled polk salad, as used in Tony Joe White's 1968 song "Polk Salad Annie":

Down there we have a plant that grows out in the woods, and the fields
And it looks somethin' like a turnip green
Everybody calls it polk salad
Now that's polk salad

— Tony Joe White, Polk Salad Annie

== Distribution and habitat ==
Pokeweed is native to eastern North America, the Midwest, the Gulf Coast, and the West Coast of the US. It is an introduced weed in Japan.

== Ecology ==
Birds are unaffected by the poisons in the berries and eat them, dispersing the seeds. The berries are reported to be a good food source for songbirds and other bird species and small animals that are unaffected by its toxins. Distribution via birds is thought to account for the appearance of isolated plants in areas otherwise free from pokeweed.

Pokeweed berries are reported to be a good food source for songbirds such as gray catbird (Dumetella carolinensis), northern mockingbird (Mimus polyglottos), northern cardinal (Cardinalis cardinals), brown thrasher (Toxostoma rufum), mourning dove (Zenaida macroura), and cedar waxwing (Bombycilla cedrorum). Small mammals apparently tolerant of its toxins include raccoon, opossum, red and gray foxes, and the white-footed mouse.

Pokeweed is sometimes used as a food source by black bears.

Pokeweed also is used as a sometime food source by the larvae of some Lepidoptera species, including the giant leopard moth (Hypercompe scribonia).

== Toxicity ==
All parts of the plant can be toxic and pose risks to the health of all mammals, including humans. Toxins are found in highest concentration in the rootstock, then leaves and stems, then the ripe fruit. The plant generally gets more toxic with maturity, with the exception of the berries, which are dangerous even while green.

Children may be attracted by clusters of berries. Ohio Agricultural Research and Development Center (OARDC) notes:

Children are most frequently poisoned by eating raw berries. Infants are especially sensitive and have died from eating only a few raw berries. Adults have been poisoned, sometimes fatally, by eating improperly prepared leaves and shoots, especially if part of the root is harvested with the shoot, and by mistaking the root for an edible tuber. Research with humans has also shown that common pokeweed can cause mutations (possibly leading to cancer) and birth defects. Since the juice of pokeweed can be absorbed through the skin, contact of plant parts with bare skin should be avoided.

Pokeweed is to be avoided during pregnancy, and children consuming even one berry may require emergency treatment. The plant sap can cause dermatitis in sensitive people.

Most mammals dislike the taste of the plant and avoid it unless it is the only food source or if it is mixed in their feed. The fresh leaves have poisoned livestock that have eaten the green leaves or roots. If death occurs, it is usually due to respiratory paralysis.

Pokeweed poisoning was common in eastern North America during the 19th century, especially from the use of tinctures as antirheumatic preparations and from ingestion of berries and roots that were mistaken for parsnip, Jerusalem artichoke, or horseradish.

=== Symptoms and response to poisoning ===
Owen states:

If taken internally, pokeweed is a slow acting but a violent emetic. Vomiting usually starts about two hours after the plant or parts of it have been eaten. Severe cases of poisoning result in purging, spasms, and sometimes convulsions. If death occurs, it is usually due to paralysis of the respiratory organs. Cases of animal or human poisoning should be handled by a veterinarian or a physician.

The OARDC staff scientists note that symptoms of poisoning include "a burning sensation in the mouth, salivation, gastrointestinal cramps, and vomiting and bloody diarrhea", and that depending upon the amount consumed, more severe symptoms can occur, including "anemia, altered heart rate and respiration, convulsions, and death from respiratory failure." If only small quantities are ingested, people and other mammals recover within one to two days.

== Uses ==
Woman preparing poke salad

=== Horticulture ===
Some pokeweeds are grown as ornamental plants, mainly for their attractive berries. A number of cultivars have been selected for larger fruit panicles.

=== Folk and alternative medicine ===
Owen notes that "Indians and early settlers used the root in poultices and certain drugs for skin diseases and rheumatism."

The late 19th century herbal, the King's American Dispensatory, describes various folk medical uses that led individuals to ingest pokeberry products. Phytolacca extract was advertised as a prescription weight loss drug in the 1890s.

Pokeweed is promoted in alternative medicine as a dietary supplement intended to treat a wide range of maladies, including mumps, arthritis, and various skin conditions. While pokeweed has been subject to laboratory research, there is no medical evidence that it has any beneficial effect on human health.

=== Food uses ===
Poke is a traditional southern Appalachian food. The leaves and stems of young plants can be eaten, but must be cooked by boiling two or more times with the water drained and replaced each time. The leaves taste similar to spinach; the stems are similar to asparagus. A 1917 article on edible weeds stated that pokeweed shoots were popular in Pennsylvania, "tied in small bundles, boiled the same way as asparagus, and served with cream sauce or melted butter."

The roots are poisonous, as are mature leaves and stems. Some festivals still celebrate the plant's use in its historical food preparations.

As late as the 1990s, two companies commercially canned and sold pokeweed, but in 2000, the last one, the Allen Canning Company of Siloam Springs, Arkansas, closed down its operation.

=== Nutrition ===
Pokeberry shoots, drained after cooking by boiling (without salt).
Nutritional value per 100 g (3.5 oz)
- Energy: 84 kJ (20 kcal)
- Carbohydrates: 3.1 g
- Sugars: 1.6 g
- Dietary fiber: 1.5 g
- Fat: 0.4 g
- Protein: 2.3 g
Vitamins and minerals
Vitamins	Quantity %DV^{†}
Vitamin A equiv. beta-Carotene lutein zeaxanthin	48% 435 μg 48% 5200 μg 1747 μg
Thiamine (B1)	6% 0.07 mg
Riboflavin (B2)	19% 0.25 mg
Niacin (B3)	7% 1.1 mg
Vitamin B6	7% 0.111 mg
Vitamin C	91% 82 mg
Vitamin K	90% 108 μg
Minerals	Quantity %DV^{†}
Calcium	4% 53 mg
Iron	7% 1.2 mg
Magnesium	3% 14 mg
Manganese	15% 0.336 mg
Phosphorus	3% 33 mg
Potassium	6% 184 mg
Sodium	1% 18 mg
- Link to USDA Database entry
- ^{†}Percentages estimated using US recommendations for adults, except for potassium, which is estimated based on expert recommendation from the National Academies.

A 100 g serving of pokeweed contains 20 Calories and 3.1 grams of carbohydrates, 1.6 grams of sugars, 1.5 grams of dietary fiber, 0.4 grams of fat, and 2.3 grams of protein, and is a rich source of vitamins A, B_{2}, C, and K, and manganese. It contains low levels of vitamin B_{1}, vitamin B_{6}, iron, calcium, magnesium, phosphorus, and potassium.

=== Other uses ===
Plant toxins from Phytolacca are being explored as a means to control zebra mussels.

The toxic extract of ripe pokeweed berries can be processed to yield a pink dye. Early European settlers to North America would procure a fine red dye from the plant's roots.

During the middle of the 19th century, wine often was coloured with juice from pokeberries.

Phytolacca contains lectins known as pokeweed mitogens, which are used to stimulate B-cell proliferation, useful for B-cell assays, immunodeficiency diagnostic tests, and immunotherapy.

== Cultural significance ==
=== In music ===
A 1969 hit written and performed by Tony Joe White, "Polk Salad Annie", is about poke sallet, the cooked greens-like dish made from pokeweed. The lyrics include:

And in the fields looks somethin' like a turnip green
And everybody calls it polk salad, polk salad

Elvis Presley covered the song.

=== In local Southern festivals ===
Poke salad festivals are held annually in several small southern towns, though often these celebrations are only remotely related to the plant as food or medicine (see and individual festival references below). Locations include:

- Toccoa, Georgia
- Arab, Alabama
- Blanchard, Louisiana
- Gainesboro, Tennessee
- Harlan, Kentucky

In Oklahoma, poke salad may be added to the annual wild onion dinners.

== Further reading and viewing ==
- P.A.G.M. De Smet, 1993, "Phytolacca americana," in Adverse Effects of Herbal Drugs, Volume 2 (Peter A. G. M. Smet, Konstantin Keller, Rudolf Hänsel, & R. Frank Chandler, Eds.), Berlin:Springer Science & Business Media, ISBN 3-642-48906-0
- ACS, 2008, "Entry: Pokeweed," at Find Support & Treatment; Treatments and Side Effects Complementary and Alternative Medicine; Herbs, Vitamins, and Minerals, see ACS Pokeweed entry, accessed 2 May 2015.
- Tyler, V. E.; Brady, L. R. & Robbers, J. E., 1988, "Poisonous plants," in Pharmacognosy, 9th ed. Philadelphia:Lea and Febiger, Chapter 15, pp. 438–455.
- Elvin-Lewis, Memory P. F.; Lewis, Walter Hepworth (2003). Medical Botany: Plants Affecting Human Health (2nd ed.). Chichester: John Wiley & Sons. pp. 82ff. ISBN 978-0-471-62882-8.
- "Tony Joe White – Polk Salad Annie," performance, date unknown, at Tony Joe White – Polk Salad Annie, accessed 2 May 2015.
- "Tony Joe White and Johnny Cash," performance, 1970, "Polk Salad (Poke Salit) Annie," from Johnny Cash Show, episode no. 27, April 8, 1970, at LiveLeak (online), see Tony Joe White & Johnny Cash-Polk Salad Annie, accessed 2 May 2015.
- Brennan Carley, 2014, "Foo Fighters Join Tony Joe White on Bluesy 'Polk Salad Annie' on 'Letterman'," Spin (online), October 16, 2014, see Foo Fighters Join Tony Joe White on Bluesy 'Polk Salad Annie' on 'Letterman', accessed 2 May 2015.
