= List of leaf vegetables =

This is a list of vegetables which are grown or harvested primarily for the consumption of their leafy parts, either raw or cooked. Many vegetables with leaves that are consumed in small quantities as a spice such as oregano, for medicinal purposes such as lime, or used in infusions, such as tea, are not included in this list.

== List ==
Key

- Citations marked with Ecoport are from the Ecoport Web site, an ecology portal developed in collaboration with the FAO.
- Those marked with GRIN are from the GRIN Taxonomy of Food Plants.
- Sources marked with Duke are from James Duke's book Handbook of Energy Crops.

Species	Common name	Observations
Abelmoschus manihot	Sunset Hibiscus	Pele tastes similar to spinach when steamed or boiled. In some Pacific Islands, it is cooked with coconut milk and a meat.
Abutilon theophrasti	China Jute	The taste is good, but since the texture of the leaves is cloth-like and not crisp, it is not very suitable for being eaten raw.
Acacia pennata	Climbing wattle	Cha-om, an important green in Burma and Thailand
Acmella oleracea	Paracress	Brèdes mafane, sharp-tasting leaves, very popular in Madagascar where they are used to prepare a dish known as romazava. In Northern Thailand it is one of the ingredients of the Kaeng khae curry.
Agasyllis latifolia	Dootsi, Ghehi	An Angelica-like aromatic herb and pot herb endemic to Georgia in the Caucasus and used particularly in the Northwestern province of Svanetia, where it is eaten variously raw, cooked and pickled. It also has medicinal properties, aiding digestion and ridding the system of intestinal worms.
Althaea officinalis	Common Marshmallow	It was an esculent vegetable among the Ancient Romans; a dish of Marsh Mallow was one of their delicacies.
Amaranthus cruentus	Purple amaranth	Thai: phak khom daeng. Vietnamese: rau dên. Amaranthus species are edible and have a pleasant taste, but contain a certain proportion of oxalic acid and should preferably be eaten after boiling and disposing of the water
Amaranthus retroflexus	Common amaranth	Thai: phak khom. Rougher than other species of Amaranth when uncultivated, but very common as a weed.
Amaranthus spinosus	Prickly amaranth	Thai: phak khom nam
Amaranthus tricolor	Amaranth	Amaranth hybrids, often from hydroponic cultivation, are popular in China and other Asian countries. They are usually eaten blanched
Amaranthus viridis	Slender amaranth	Malayalam; chiira
Apium graveolens	Celery	Generally the stalk is preferred, but the leaves are a staple in many soups. Some people have celery allergy which can cause potentially fatal anaphylactic shock.
Atriplex hortensis	Garden orache	Used cooked or raw. In salads it is traditionally mixed with sorrel leaves in order to modify the acidity of the latter
Barbarea verna	Bank cress	It is considered a satisfactory substitute for watercress.
Barringtonia acutangula	Chik-nam, Kra don	Shoots and young leaves are eaten raw with Nam phrik. Popular in Isan
Basella alba	Indian spinach	
Beta cicla	Chard	One of the cultivated descendants of the Sea Beet
Beta vulgaris	Beet, Beetroot	The young leaves can be added raw to salads, whilst the mature leaves are most commonly served boiled or steamed, in which case they have a taste and texture similar to spinach
Beta vulgaris maritima	Sea Beet	
Borago officinalis	Common Borage	Widespread as a leaf vegetable in former times. Still valued in some places in Italy and Northern Spain
Brassica carinata	Abyssinian Cabbage	
Brassica juncea	Indian mustard	
Brassica napus	Rutabaga	Sag, popular in Indian and Nepalese cuisine, usually stir-fried with salt, garlic and spices
Brassica napus var. pabularia	Rape Kale	
Brassica nigra	Black Mustard	Black mustard is commonly found in neglected gardens, on roadsides, in abandoned fields, and in areas where waste is disposed of. The plant is native to Asia and Europe, but now grows over much of southern Canada and almost all of the United States. This is the chief mustard used in condiments and as such is normally associated with hot-dogs. To make the mustard condiment, the seeds must be ground fine and then mixed with flour and a small portion of water and vinegar. The plant can be cultivated for its young leaves which are used in a salad or as a pot herb.
Brassica oleracea	Wild Cabbage	
Brassica oleracea var. acephala	Kale	Kale is a type of cabbage that has flat or curly leaves and stem colors ranging from dark green to burgundy. Kale contains many nutrients including calcium, iron, and vitamins A, C, and K. Young leaves can be harvested to use fresh in salads or allowed to mature and used as a cooked green. Kale can be found throughout the summer months, but is especially sweet after a frost.
Brassica oleracea var. alboglabra	Kai-lan	Also known as Chinese kale
Brassica oleracea var. botrytis	Cauliflower	
Brassica oleracea var. capitata	Cabbage	
Brassica oleracea var. gemmifera	Brussels Sprouts	
Brassica oleracea var. italica	Broccoli	
Brassica oleracea var. palmifolia	Lacinato kale	Also known as Tuscan kale, Tuscan cabbage, Italian kale, dinosaur kale, flat back cabbage, palm tree kale, or black Tuscan palm
Brassica rapa subsp. rapa	Turnip	Leaves popular in the southern United States, Galicia, Spain (Grelos)
Brassica rapa subsp. chinensis	Bok Choi	
Brassica oleracea var. sabauda L.	Chinese Savoy	
Brassica rapa subsp. nipposinica	Mizuna	
Brassica rapa subsp. pekinensis	Napa Cabbage	
Brassica rapa	Rapini	
Brassica rapa var. perviridis	Komatsuna	
Brassica rapa var. rosularis	Tatsoi	
Calamus erectus	Viagra palm	Young leaves and shoots are cooked and eaten as a vegetable in India
Campanula rapunculus	Rampion	It was once widely grown in Europe for its leaves, which were used like spinach
Campanula versicolor	Harebell	Used in Greek cuisine
Capsicum frutescens	Labuyo chili	Leaves used in Filipino cuisine, notably in the soup tinola
Capparis spinosa	Caper	Caper leaves are part of the Greek cuisine
Carica papaya	Papaya	The leaves are part of Lalab in Sundanese cuisine, Buntil in Javanese cuisine or sauteed with slices of chilis in Indonesian cuisine
Celosia argentea var. argentea	Wild Coxcomb	Known as "Lagos spinach", it is one of the main boiled greens in West Africa
Centella asiatica	Asian pennywort, Gotukola	Bai bua bok, popular green in Thailand; Gotukola Sambola in Sri Lanka
Chenopodium album	Lamb's Quarters	Popular type of Palak in Northern India. Also used to stuff paratha
Chenopodium ambrosioides	American Wormseed	Chenopodium species are edible, but many species are mediocre as a leaf vegetable.
Chenopodium berlandieri subsp. nuttalliae	Southern Huauzontle	
Chenopodium bonus-henricus	Good King Henry	One of the finest Chenopodium species
Chenopodium giganteum	Tree Spinach	
Chenopodium glaucum	Oak-Leaved Goosefoot	
Chenopodium nuttalliae	Huauzontle	Popular in Mexico
Chenopodium quinoa subsp. quinoa	Quinoa	It has its origin in the Andean region
Chenopodium rubrum	Red Goosefoot	
Chrysanthemum coronarium	Garland chrysanthemum	Popular in Korean, Cantonese, Taiwanese, Hong Kong and Japanese cuisine
Cichorium endivia	Endive	
Cichorium endivia var. crispum	Curly endive	Sometimes called "chicory" in the United States, called chicorée frisée in French
Cichorium endivia var. latifolium	Broad-leaved endive	Escarole in French
Cichorium intybus	Chicory	Leaves cooked with Fave in Northern Italy
Cichorium intybus var. foliosum	Belgian endive	Also known as witloof
Cichorium intybus var. foliosum	Puntarelle	Also known as Catalogna chicory
Cichorium intybus var. foliosum	Radicchio	Popular in Italy
Cichorium intybus	Sugarloaf	
Cirsium oleraceum	Cabbage thistle	
Claytonia perfoliata	Miner's lettuce	Used by California Gold Rush miners who ate it to prevent scurvy. Like lettuce but rougher
Claytonia sibirica	Siberian spring beauty	Has beet-flavoured leaves.
Cleome gynandra	African cabbage	Widespread in many tropical and sub-tropical areas of the world. Its leaves form an important part of diets in Southern Africa.
Cnidoscolus aconitifolius	Chaya or Tree spinach	Traditional food in parts of Central and South America. Leaves must be cooked before being eaten.
Coccinia grandis	Ivy Gourd	Leaves cooked in soups in Thailand.
Colocasia esculenta	Taro	Only the young leaves are eaten. Popular in Mauritius.
Corchorus olitorius	Jew's mallow	Used in Molokhiya
Coriandrum sativum	Cilantro, Coriander	Used mainly for garnishing or in small quantities
Cosmos caudatus	Kenikir, Ulam Raja	In Indonesian cuisine and Malaysian cuisine the leaves of this plant are used for salad
Crambe maritima	Sea kale	It was popular as a blanched vegetable in the early 19th Century, but its use declined
Crassocephalum crepidioides	Redflower ragleaf	Traditionally eaten as a green in tropical Africa. Possible toxicity not well studied
Cratoxylum formosum	Phak tiu som or Phak tiu daeng	Young leaves are edible. Popular in Laos, Thailand (Isan) and Vietnam
Crithmum maritimum	Samphire	In the 19th century, samphire was being shipped in casks of seawater from the Isle of Wight to market in London at the end of May each year.
Crotalaria longirostrata	Chipilín	A common leafy vegetable in the local cuisines of southern Mexico
Cryptotaenia japonica	Mitsuba	Small quantities added to soups, etc.
Cucumis prophetarum		Leaves are cooked and served with staples in Africa.
Cyclanthera pedata	Caigua	Traditional green in Central America and South America
Cynara cardunculus	Cardoon	Leaf stems are valued as food
Diplazium esculentum	Vegetable fern	Probably the most commonly consumed fern
Diplotaxis tenuifolia	Perennial Wall-rocket	Often marketed under the same common names (Arugula, Rocket, Baby leaf rocket etc) as Eruca sativa
Erythrina fusca	Thong lang	Fresh raw leaves eaten in Thailand in Miang kham.
Eruca sativa	Arugula, Rocket	Especially appreciated in Veneto, Italy
Emex spinosa	Lesser jack	It was formerly used as a leafy vegetable, but not highly valued
Eryngium foetidum	Bhandhanya, Culantro	Eaten as a leafy green in Thailand. Used as seasoning in the Caribbean.
Foeniculum vulgare	Fennel	
Galactites tomentosa	Scarlina	Edible type of thistle
Galinsoga parviflora	Gallant Soldier	Popular in Colombia and Peru in soups and salads
Glechoma hederacea	Ground Ivy	
Glinus lotoides	Lotus sweet juice	Used as a leaf vegetable in many tropical countries
Gnetum gnemon	Melinjo	Popular in Indonesian cuisine.
Gynura crepidioides	Okinawan spinach	Grown commercially as a vegetable in China
Halimione portulacoides	Sea purslane	
Hibiscus sabdariffa	Roselle	Telugu: Gongura. Roselle leaves are edible and have a pleasant taste. This plant has good medicinal value. In some areas, it is used as a substitute for Jute.
Hirschfeldia incana	Shortpod mustard	
Honckenya peploides	Sea sandwort	Traditionally used as food by the inhabitants of coastal Subarctic areas
Houttuynia cordata	Fishwort	Popular as a leaf vegetable particularly in Vietnam
Hydrophyllum canadense	John's Cabbage	It was used as a leaf vegetable by Native American peoples
Hydrophyllum virginianum	Shawnee Salad	It was used as a leaf vegetable by Native American peoples
Hyoseris radiata		Used in Liguria, Italy, to make preboggion
Hypochaeris maculata	Spotted Cat's-ear	Similar to dandelion but not as tasty
Hypochaeris radicata	Catsear	Young leaves should be harvested before they become too fibrous
Inula crithmoides	Golden samphire	Young leaves may be eaten raw or cooked as a leaf vegetable.
Inula helenium	Elecampane	Leaves are edible, although root is preferred
Ipomoea aquatica Forssk.	Water Spinach	Popular leafy green in Southeast Asia
Ipomoea batatas var. batatas	Sweet Potato	
Kleinhovia hospita		Young leaves are eaten as a vegetable in Malaya, Indonesia and Papua New Guinea.
Lablab purpureus	Lablab	The leaves are used as greens, but have to be cooked like spinach and the water has to be discarded.
Lactuca indica	Indian Lettuce	
Lactuca perennis		
Lactuca sativa	Lettuce	The wild varieties differ much from the average cultivated salad lettuce.
Lactuca sativa	Celtuce	
Lactuca serriola	Prickly Lettuce	Prickly lettuce is a common edible weed that is native to Europe, but can now be found from coast to coast in the United States. The name comes from the small prickles that can be found on the lower part of the stem and the midrib of the leaves. The plant is found in fields, places of waste, and roadsides. The leaves of the plant reach out towards the sun and for this reason the plant is sometimes called the Compass Plant. Prickly Lettuce can grow to be from two to five feet tall but should be harvested early on when it is a few inches high. The young leaves of the plant are very tender and make an excellent salad green. As a potherb, the plant needs little cooking and is commonly made with a sauce of melted butter or vinegar. Prickly lettuce should be harvested in spring or early summer.
Lagenaria siceraria	Bottle Gourd	In Burma young leaves are boiled and eaten with nga peet spicy sauce
Lallemantia iberica	Dragon's head	Cultivated in ancient times. Popular in Iran as green vegetable
Lamium album	White deadnettle	
Lamium amplexicaule	Henbit deadnettle	
Lamium purpureum	Red deadnettle	Leaves of plants are eaten in salads or in stirfry.
Lapsana communis	Nipplewort	Cultivated in Ancient Rome. Presently it is not valued as a leafy vegetable
Launaea sarmentosa	Kuḷḷafila	Used in Maldivian cuisine, usually finely chopped and mixed with Maldives fish and grated coconut in a dish known as mas huni.
Leichhardtia australis	Bush Banana	Traditional food of the Indigenous Australian people
Leontodon hispidus	Hawkbit	Leontodon species are dandelion-like plants that are generally edible
Leontodon tuberosus		Popular in Crete as a leafy green
Lepidium campestre	Field pepperweed	All Lepidium species are edible. Appreciated for their peppery taste
Lepidium latifolium	Dittander	
Lepidium meyenii	Maca	A traditional vegetable of the Andean mountain areas
Lepidium sativum	Garden cress	Used in soups, sandwiches and salads for its tangy flavor
Lepidium virginicum	Virginia pepperweed	
Leucaena leucocephala	Phak kratin	Popular in Laos and Thailand (Isan)
Levisticum officinale	Lovage	Used in salads and soups. Flavor and smell are very similar to celery
Limnocharis flava	Genjer	Used in Southeast Asia, but considered inferior fare in some places
Limnophila aromatica	Rice paddy herb, Ngò om	Popular in Vietnamese cuisine as an ingredient in canh chua, a sweet and sour seafood soup
Limnophila indica		
Lysimachia clethroides	Gooseneck Loosestrife	Edible, but considered poor fare
Malva neglecta		All Malva species are edible, but are generally considered poor fare or rough food
Malva parviflora	Cheeseweed	
Malva sylvestris	Mallow	
Malva moschata	Musk Mallow	
Malva verticillata var. crispa		
Manihot esculenta subsp. esculenta	Cassava	Should be always eaten boiled after disposing of the water. In some countries cassava leaves are regarded as a poor man's food and only eaten when there is nothing else.
Marsilea crenata	Semanggi	Steamed leaf are used in certain areas of Java as component of pecel
Matteuccia struthiopteris	Kogomi, fiddleheads	The sprouts are a delicacy in Japanese and North American cuisines
Megacarpaea polyandra	多蕊高河菜 duo rui gao he cai	From the cabbage family. The young leaves are cooked as a vegetable in China
Mentha arvensis piperascens	Japanese mint	All Mentha species are edible, but generally used in small quantities as garnishing or in salads
Mentha longifolia	Habek mint	
Mertensia maritima	Sea bluebell	Traditionally used as food after boiling by the Inuit
Mesembryanthemum crystallinum	Ice plant	
Mimulus guttatus	Seep monkey flower	The raw or cooked leaves were one of the traditional foods of the Mendocino and Miwok Indians, among other native peoples
Mirabilis expansa	Mauka	One of the important food crops of the ancient Inca empire. Leaves were eaten as a leaf vegetable or used raw in salads.
Morinda citrifolia	Noni tree	Known as bai-yo in Thai cuisine the leaves are cooked with coconut milk in a curry.
Moringa oleifera	Drumstick tree	Leaves are very popular in South Asia for curries and omelettes.
Moringa ovalifolia	South-west African moringa	Found in northern Namibia and south-western Angola
Moringa stenopetala	Ethiopian moringa	
Mycelis muralis	Wall lettuce	Leaves eaten raw in salads
Myrianthus arboreus	Ujuju	Important food source in the Delta and Edo States of Nigeria
Myriophyllum brasiliense	Parrot feather	Used as a leaf vegetable in South America
Myrrhis odorata	Cicely	Young stalks and leaves are eaten in salads
Nasturtium officinale	Watercress	One of the most popular salad greens in certain areas, but watercress crops grown in the presence of animal waste can be a haven for parasites such as the liver fluke Fasciola hepatica.
Neptunia oleracea Loureiro	Phak chet	Widely used in Thailand. Eaten raw with Nam phrik
Nymphaea odorata	Fragrant Water Lily	Young leaves were eaten as a vegetable by Native Americans
Nymphoides indica	Water Snowflake	Young leaves and stems are edible.
Nymphoides peltata	Yellow floating heart	
Ocimum basilicum	Sweet Basil	Used in soups and sauces.
O. basilicum var. thyrsiflora	Thai basil	Eaten both raw and cooked
Ocimum × citriodorum	Lemon basil	Used throughout Southeast Asia
Oenanthe javanica	Water Celery	Used in Southeast Asia and the Far East
Oenothera biennis	Common evening primrose	
Oenothera hookeri	Hooker's Evening-primrose	Leaves are cooked as greens
Onoclea sensibilis	Sensitive fern	It was used as a vegetable by the Iroquois
Oroxylum indicum	Pheka	Has edible leaves and stems, eaten especially in Isan (Thailand) and in Laos
Oryza sativa	Rice	
Osmorhiza aristata		Grows in China and Japan
Osmunda cinnamomea	Cinnamon fern	
Osmunda claytoniana	Interrupted fern	
Oxalis acetosella	Common wood sorrel	Oxalis species contain oxalic acid and should not be eaten for long periods in large quantities. If possible, they should be eaten after boiling and disposing of the water
Oxalis corniculata	Creeping woodsorrel	
Oxalis deppei	Iron Cross	Popular as a vegetable in Mexico for its sharp, lemony taste
Oxalis oregana	Redwood sorrel	
Oxalis stricta	Common yellow woodsorrel	
Oxalis tuberosa	Oca	
Oxalis violacea		
Oxyria digyna	Mountain sorrel	
Pachira aquatica	Money tree	
Pachira insignis		
Paederia foetida		
Parkia biglandulosa		
Parkia speciosa	Petai	
Parkinsonia florida	Blue Palo Verde	
Pastinaca sativa subsp. sativa	Parsnip	
Patrinia scabiosifolia	Golden lace	
Patrinia villosa		
Paulownia tomentosa	Empress tree	
Pedalium murex	Burra Gookeroo	Mucilaginous
Peperomia pellucida	Clearweed	
Pereskia aculeata	Barbados Gooseberry	
Pergularia daemia		
Perilla frutescens	Perilla	
Persicaria hydropiper	Water pepper	The leaves of a cultivar of this plant are eaten in Japan
Persicaria vulgaris		
Petasites frigidus	Arctic butterbur	
Petroselinum crispum	Parsley	Only eaten as garnish, not in large quantities
Peucedanum ostruthium		
Phaseolus coccineus	Runner Bean	
Phaseolus lunatus	Lima Bean	
Phaseolus vulgaris	Bean	
Phragmites australis	Common Reed	
Phyla scaberrima	Rough fogfruit	
Phyllanthus acidus	Star Gooseberry	
Phyllanthus emblica	Myrobalan	
Phyteuma orbiculare	Round-headed rampion	
Phytolacca acinosa	Indian Pokeberry	
Phytolacca acinosa var. esculenta		
Phytolacca americana	American Pokeweed	Poisonous until properly prepared.
Phytolacca dioica	Bella Sombra	
Phytolacca rivinoides	Deer calalu	
Pilea melastomoides	Pohpohan	Eaten raw in Lalab dish
Pimpinella anisum	Aniseed	
Pimpinella saxifraga	Burnet Saxifrage	
Pinus densiflora	Japanese Red Pine	
Piper auritum	Mexican pepperleaf	Known as Hoja santa (holy leaf). Aromatic herb with a heart-shaped, velvety leaf often used in Mexican cuisine for tamales and sauces.
Piper guineense	West African pepper	
Piper sarmentosum	Cha-phlu	Popular in Thailand in Miang kham
Pipturus argenteus	Queensland grass-cloth plant	
Pisonia grandis	Tree lettuce	The leaves are traditionally used as a leaf vegetable in some countries. Traditionally eaten by Maldivians in Mas huni.
Pistacia chinensis	Chinese Pistache	
Pistacia terebinthus	Terebinth	
Pistia stratiotes	Water Lettuce	
Pisum sativum	Garden pea	
Plantago coronopus	Buckshorn plantain	Some people may be allergic to this plant.
Plantago lanceolata	Long-leaved plantain	
Plantago major	Broad-leaved Plantain	
Plantago maritima		
Pluchea indica		
Podophyllum hexandrum	Himalayan mayapple	
Poliomintha incana		
Polygonum aviculare	Knotweed	
Polygonum bistorta	Bistort	
Polygonum bistortoides	American Bistort	
Polygonum viviparum	Alpine bistort	
Polyscias fruticosa		
Poncirus trifoliata	Trifoliate orange	
Pontederia cordata		
Portulaca oleracea	Common purslane	Popular in Greek cuisine
Portulaca pilosa		
Portulacaria afra	Elephant Bush	
Primula veris	Cowslip	
Primula vulgaris	Primrose	
Pringlea antiscorbutica	Kerguelen cabbage	Its leaves contain a Vitamin C-rich oil, a fact which, in the days of sailing ships, made it very attractive to British sailors suffering from scurvy
Prosopis spicegera		
Prunella vulgaris		
Pediomelum esculentum syn. Psoralea esculenta	Prairie turnip	The prairie turnip is a legume that was often used by American Indians located in the Great Plains. Roots of the legumes provide a valuable source of protein, minerals, and carbohydrates. Most turnips have white skin and the portion of the plant that is seen above the ground is purple, red, or green in color. The root below the surface is known as the taproot and is usually around 5-20 centimeters in diameter.
Pteris ensiformis		
Ptychosperma elegans		
Pulicaria odora		
Pulmonaria officinalis	Lungwort	
Puya caerulea		
Puya chilensis		
Pyrus betulaefolia	Birch-Leaved Pear	
Ranunculus ficaria	Lesser celandine	
Raphanus raphanistrum	Wild radish	
Raphanus raphanistrum ssp. landra		
Raphanus raphanistrum ssp. maritimus		
Raphanus sativus	Radish	
Raphanus sativus var. longipinnatus	Chinese radish	
Raphia hookeri	Raffia palm	
Reichardia picroides	French Scorzonera	
Rhamnus dahurica		
Rheum rhabarbarum		
Rheum tataricum		
Rhexia virginica	Meadow beauty	
Rhodiola rosea	Roseroot	
Rhododendron arboreum		
Rhopalostylis sapida	Nikau	
Ribes cereum		
Ribes divaricatum		
Ribes nigrum	Blackcurrant	
Ribes odoratum		
Rorippa indica		
Rorippa islandica		
Rosa multiflora	Seven Sisters Rose	
Roystonea elata		
Roystonea oleracea		
Rubus rosaefolius		
Rumex acetosa	Common sorrel	Many species of Rumex are edible, but they contain a relatively high proportion of oxalic acid. Raw leaves should be eaten sparingly and leaves should preferably be used after boiling and disposing of the water.
Rumex rugosus	Garden sorrel	A cultigen of Rumex acetosa.
Salicornia europaea	Glasswort	Glasswort is a leafless plant with jointed stems that are a light green color in the summer and a red color in the fall. There are very small flowers within the segmented portions of the plant. The plant is found in coastal salt marshes and alkaline soils within south Nova Scotia and Eastern and central North America. The stems have a salty flavor and can be harvested to be used in salads, as a puree, or as a pickled condiment.
Salix babylonica	Weeping Willow	
Salix daphnoides		
Salix gracilistyla	Rosegold pussy willow	
Salsola kali	Saltwort	
Salsola komarovii	Land Seaweed	
Salsola soda	Opposite leaved saltwort	
Salvadora persica	Toothbrush tree	
Sambucus javanica		
Sambucus sieboldiana		
Sanguisorba canadensis		
Sanguisorba minor	Salad Burnet	
Sanguisorba officinalis	Great Burnet	
Sassafras albidum	Sassafras	
Sauropus androgynus	Katuk	A traditional vegetable in some tropical countries that should be consumed in moderate quantities due to the presence of papaverine
Saxifraga pensylvanica	Eastern Swamp Saxifrage	The Cherokee traditionally ate the leaves raw as greens
Saxifraga stolonifera	Creeping Rockfoil	Occasionally used fresh or cooked in Japanese cuisine
Schleichera oleosa		
Scolymus hispanicus	Tagarnina	Edible thistle. Popular in Southern Spanish cuisine
Scolymus maculatus	Spotted golden thistle	
Scorzonera hispanica	Scorzonera	
Scutellaria baicalensis	Baikal Skullcap	
Sechium edule	Chayote	
Sedum anacampseros	Love-restorer	All stonecrops (Sedum) are edible, but are generally mediocre food.
Sedum divergens	Spreading stonecrop	Traditional salad vegetable of the Haida and the Nisga'a people of Northwest British Columbia.
Sedum reflexum	Jenny's stonecrop	Occasionally used as a salad leaf or herb in Europe.
Sedum rhodanthum	Rose crown	
Sedum telephium	Livelong	
Senna occidentalis	Digutiyara	Traditionally eaten in the Maldives in Mas huni. Leaves are finely chopped.
Senna siamea	Cassod Tree	Used in Thai cuisine in a curry named Kaeng khilek. Leaves are boiled and strained and the water discarded.
Sesamum alatum	Sésame de gazelle	Eaten in dry regions of Africa like Chad as a vegetable. Considered as famine food in some areas
Sesamum indicum	Sesame	
Sesamum radiatum	Benniseed	Fresh leaves and young shoots are a popular leafy vegetable in Africa
Sesbania grandiflora	West Indian pea	
Sesbania sesban	Sesban	
Sesuvium portulacastrum	Sea Purselane	
Setaria palmifolia	Palm-grass	
Sicyos angulatus		
Sida rhombifolia	Arrowleaf sida	
Sidalcea neomexicana		
Silaum silaus	Pepper saxifrage	Despite the name, it is neither a saxifrage nor peppery in taste
Silene acaulis	Moss campion	
Silene vulgaris	Bladder Campion	Collejas; a traditional green in Manchego cuisine, Spain
Silybum marianum	Blessed milk thistle	
Sinapis alba	White Mustard	
Sinapis arvensis	Charlock	
Sisymbrium altissimum		
Sisymbrium crassifolium		
Sisymbrium irio	London rocket	
Sisymbrium officinale	Hedge mustard	
Sium cicutaefolium		
Smyrnium olusatrum	Alexanders	
Solenostemon rotundifolius	Chinese potato	
Solidago missouriensis		
Sonchus arvensis	Field sow-thistle	
Sonchus asper	Spiny-leaved sow thistle	
Sonchus oleraceus	Sow Thistle	Leaves are eaten as salad greens or cooked like spinach. This is one of the species used in Chinese cuisine as kŭcài (菜; lit. bitter vegetable).
Sophora japonica	Pagoda-tree	
Spathiphyllum phryniifolium		
Sphenoclea zeylanica		
Sphenostylis stenocarpa		
Spilanthes acmella	Toothache Plant	
Spinacia oleracea	Spinach	Spinach contains a certain proportion of oxalic acid. Raw leaves should be eaten sparingly. In dishes that include large quantities, leaves should preferably be used after boiling and disposing of the water.
Spirodela polyrhiza	Greater Duck-weed	
Spondias dulcis		
Stanleya pinnatifida		
Stellaria media	Common Chickweed	
Stenochlaena palustris		
Sterculia foetida		
Sterculia tragacantha		
Strychnos spinosa	Natal orange	
Suaeda maritima	Sea Blite	
Symphytum officinale	Comfrey	
Symphytum × uplandicum	(Russian) Comfrey	
Synedrella nodiflora		
Syzygium malaccense	Malay apple	
Syzygium polycephalum		
Talinum paniculatum	Jewels of Opar	
Talinum portulacifolium		
Talinum triangulare		
Tanacetum vulgare	Tansy	
Taraxacum albidum		
Taraxacum officinale	Dandelion	
Telfairia occidentalis	Fluted gourd	
Telosma cordata		
Tetracarpidium conophorum		
Tetragonia decumbens		
Tetragonia implexicoma		
Tetragonia tetragonioides	New Zealand Spinach	
Thlaspi arvense	Pennycress	
Thymus vulgaris	Common Thyme	
Tiliacora triandra		
Toddalia asiatica		
Tordylium apulum		
Tragopogon dubius	Western salsify	
Tragopogon porrifolius	Salsify	
Tragopogon pratensis	Goat's Beard	
Trianthema portulacastrum		
Trichodesma zeylanicum		
Trifolium hybridum	Alsike Clover	Clover leaves are edible, but should be dipped in salt water before eating or preparation to aid in digestion
Trifolium pratense	Red Clover	
Trifolium repens	White Clover	
Trigonella caerulea	Sweet Trefoil	
Trigonella corniculata		
Trillium erectum	Wake-robin	
Trillium grandiflorum	White trillium	
Trillium sessile		
Trillium undulatum	Painted trillium	
Tropaeolum majus	Garden Nasturtium	
Tropaeolum minus	Dwarf Nasturtium	
Tropaeolum tuberosum	Mashua	
Tulbaghia alliacea		
Tussilago farfara	Coltsfoot	
Typha capensis		
Typha elephantina		
Ullucus tuberosus	Ulluco	
Ulmus pumila	Siberian elm	
Urena lobata	Rose Mallow	
Urtica dioica	Stinging Nettle	A good pot herb. Often also used as famine food
Urtica urens	Annual Nettle	
Valerianella eriocarpa	Italian Corn Salad	
Valerianella locusta	Corn Salad	
Vallaris heynei		
Verbena officinalis	European Verbena	
Vernonia amygdalina	Bitter leaf	
Veronica anagallis-aquatica	Water Speedwell	
Veronica beccabunga	Brooklime	
Veronicastrum sibiricum		
Viola adunca		
Viola canadensis	Canada Violet	
Viola odorata	Sweet Violet	
Viola papilionacea		
Viola pedata	Bird's Foot Violet	
Viola sororia	Common blue violet	
Viola x wittrockiana		
Vitex doniana		
Vitis amurensis	Amur grape	
Vitis californica	California wild grape	
Vitis coignetiae		
Vitis labrusca	Northern Fox Grape	
Vitis munsoniana		
Vitis shuttleworthii		
Vitis vinifera	Grape	
Wasabia japonica	Wasabi	Fresh leaves can be eaten, having the spicy flavor of wasabi roots
Wisteria floribunda	Japanese wisteria	
Wolffia arrhiza		
Wollastonia biflora	Sea daisy	The leaves and shoots are edible and are eaten cooked in Malaysian cuisine as a leaf vegetable and in [Langk http://ecoport.org/ep?Plant=2162awi] raw with chili and shrimp paste sambal.
Xanthoceras sorbifolium	Yellowhorn	
Xanthosoma atrovirens		
Xanthosoma brasiliense		
Xanthosoma sagittifolium		
Xanthosoma violaceum		
Ximenia americana		
Zanthoxylum piperitum		
Zanthoxylum planispinum		
Zingiber zerumbet	Awapuhi	

== See also ==
- List of vegetables
- List of foods
- List of vegetable dishes
