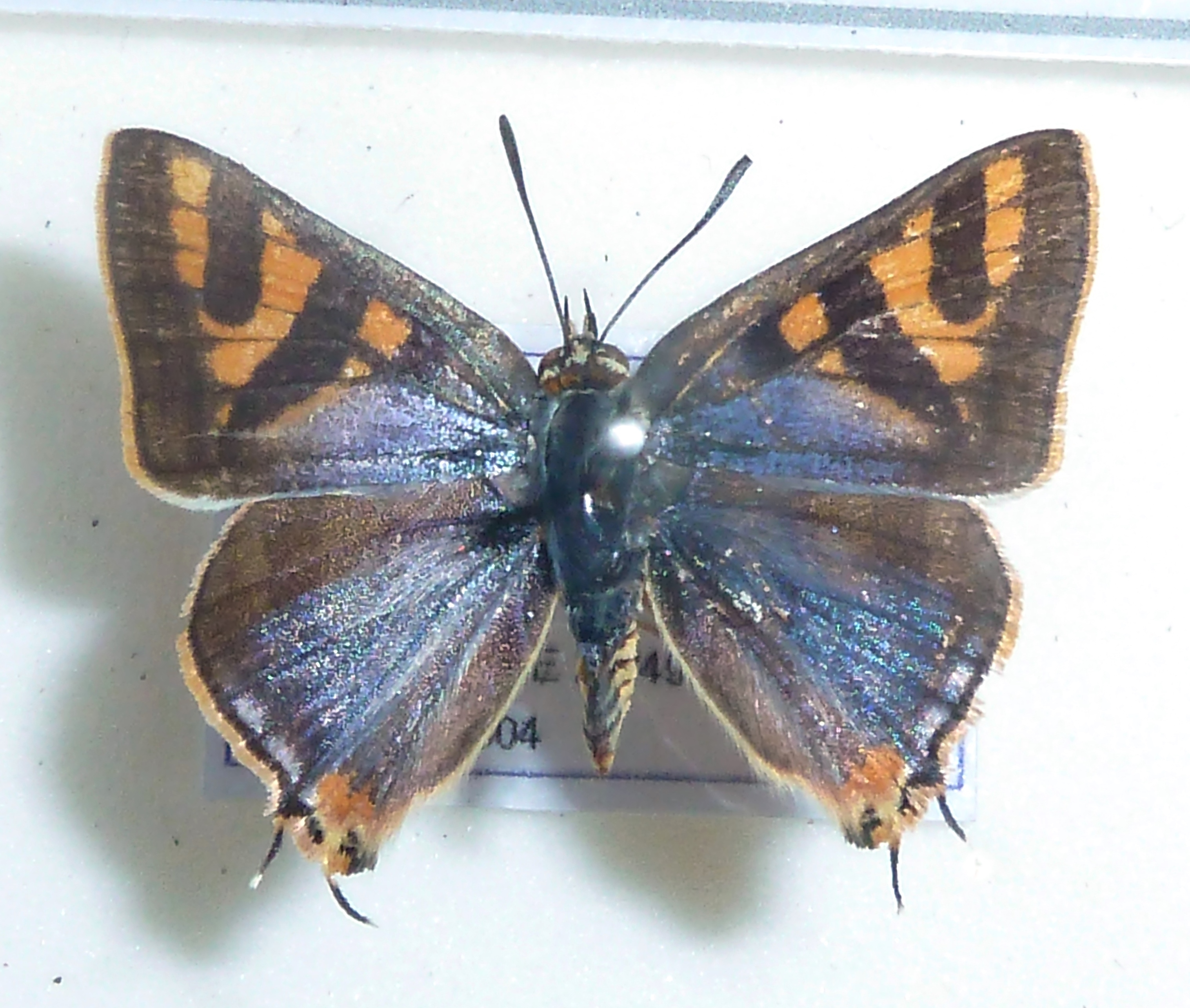

Scientific classification
- Kingdom: Animalia
- Phylum: Arthropoda
- Clade: Pancrustacea
- Class: Insecta
- Order: Lepidoptera
- Family: Lycaenidae
- Genus: Cigaritis
- Species: C. mozambica

Binomial name
- Cigaritis mozambica (Bertolini, 1850)

Synonyms
- Thecla etolus var. mozambica Bertolini, 1850; Spindasis mozambica; Aphnaeus caffer Trimen, 1868

= Cigaritis mozambica =

Mozambique bar

Species of butterfly

Cigaritis mozambica, the Mozambique bar or Mozambique silverline, is a butterfly of the family Lycaenidae. It is found in tropical Africa. In South Africa it is found from the coast of KwaZulu-Natal to the Drakensberg, then to Eswatini, the Free State, Gauteng, Mpumalanga, Limpopo and North West provinces.

The wingspan is 22–25 mm for males and 25–28 mm for females. Adults are on wing year-round with peaks in late summer.

The larvae feed on Sphenostylis angustifolia. They are associated with ants of the genus Crematogaster.
