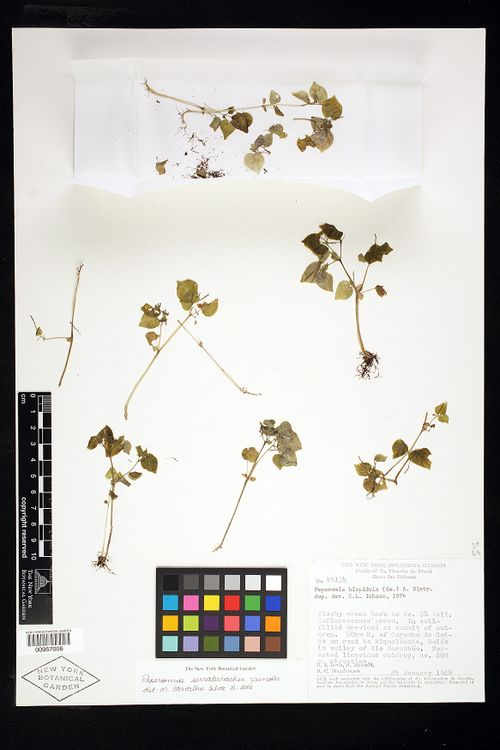

Scientific classification
- Kingdom: Plantae
- Clade: Tracheophytes
- Clade: Angiosperms
- Clade: Magnoliids
- Order: Piperales
- Family: Piperaceae
- Genus: Peperomia
- Species: P. serratirhachis

Binomial name
- Peperomia serratirhachis Yunck.

= Peperomia serratirhachis =

Species of flowering plant

Peperomia serratirhachis is a species of epiphyte in the genus Peperomia that is endemic in Brazil. Its conservation status is Threatened.

== Description ==
Peperomia serratirhachis is an erect or suberect, branching, pellucid herb that is 5–8 cm high, glabrous with the exception of scattered flaccid setose hairs on the leaves and occasionally at the nodes. The leaves are ovate, with an obtuse tip and cordate base that is 15 mm wide and as long. The leaves are 5-nerved, the midrib and lateral nerves are strongly branched upward, drying very thin, transparent. Its petioles are 5 mm long. The spikes are leaf-opposed and at the tip that are 1 mm thick and 2 cm long. Its peduncles are 5 mm long. The rachis are flattened. The bracts are small and round while having tooth-like projections of the rachis. The drupes are around 0.8 mm long, ellipsoidal, verrucose, with a short, conic style and apical stigma, sessile, or at the most subpedicelate.

The branching, upright, subglabrous plants, ovate leaves, flattened and toothed rachis, and the scarely stalked fruits distinguish this species. It resembles P. pellucida (L.) Kunth somewhat but differs in a number of characteristics. From P. hispidula (Sw.) A.Dietr. var. sellowiana (Miq.) Dahlst. it differs in its scarcely pedicellate fruits and toothed rachis.

== Taxonomy and naming ==
It was described in 1966 by Truman G. Yuncker in Boletim do Instituto de Botânica 3, from a single specimen collected at Caminho do Rosário, Mato Grosso, Brazil by João Geraldo Kuhlmann. The name refers to the toothed character of the rachis.

== Distribution and habitat ==
It is endemic in Brazil, occurring in Mato Grosso, Goiás and Tocantins. It grows on a epiphyte environment and is a herb.

== Conservation ==
This species is assessed as Threatened, in a preliminary report.
