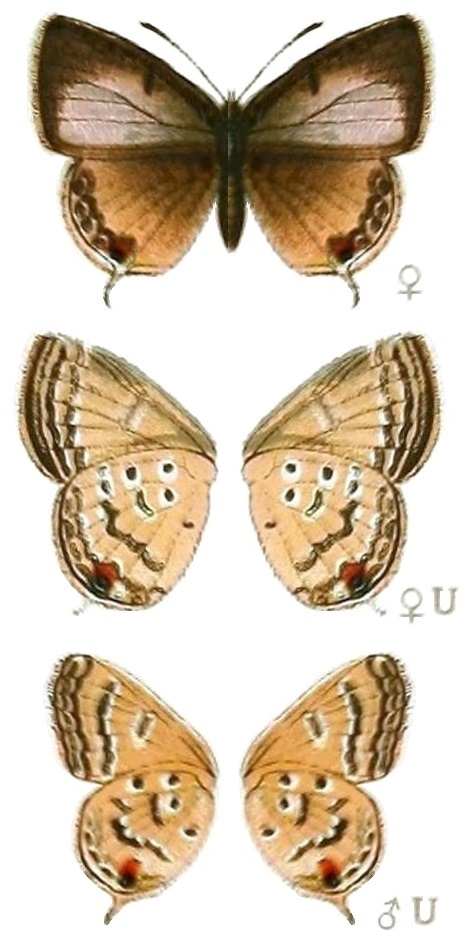

Scientific classification
- Kingdom: Animalia
- Phylum: Arthropoda
- Class: Insecta
- Order: Lepidoptera
- Family: Lycaenidae
- Genus: Euchrysops
- Species: E. barkeri

Binomial name
- Euchrysops barkeri (Trimen, 1893)

Synonyms
- Lycaena barkeri Trimen, 1893

= Euchrysops barkeri =

Barker's smoky blue

Species of butterfly

Euchrysops barkeri, the Barker's smoky blue or Barker's Cupid, is a butterfly of the family Lycaenidae.

== Description ==
The wingspan is 26–32 mm for males and 27–33 mm for females. Adults are on wing year-round, but are most common from November to July in South Africa.

== Habitat and behavior ==
It is found in South Africa, Zimbabwe, Mozambique and from Sierra Leone to Tanzania. In South Africa it is found from the East Cape along the KwaZulu-Natal coast and in Limpopo province.

== Life cycle ==
The female oviposits at the stem of Sphenostylis angustifolia (Fabaceae). The egg is pale sky-blue with a sparkling pearlescent lustre.

The larvae feed on Crotalaria and Rhynchosia species and Vigna unguiculata.
