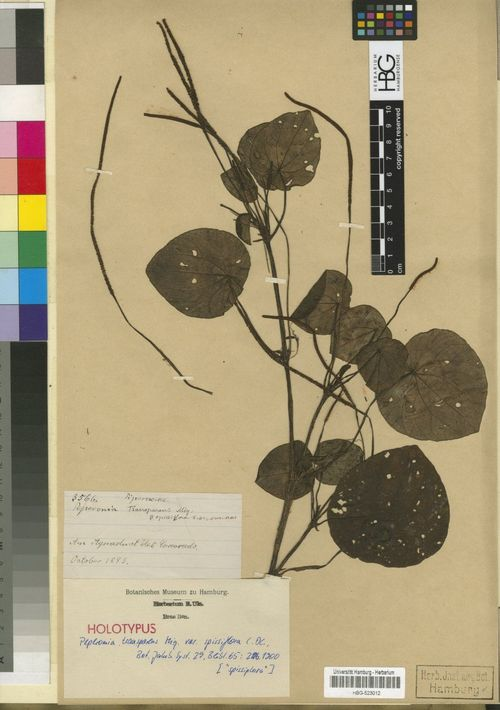

Scientific classification
- Kingdom: Plantae
- Clade: Tracheophytes
- Clade: Angiosperms
- Clade: Magnoliids
- Order: Piperales
- Family: Piperaceae
- Genus: Peperomia
- Species: P. transparens

Binomial name
- Peperomia transparens Miq.

= Peperomia transparens =

Species of flowering plant

Peperomia transparens is a species of lithophyte in the genus Peperomia that is found in Brazil, French Guiana, and Suriname. It primarily grows on wet tropical biomes. Its conservation status is Not Threatened.

== Description ==
The first specimens where collected in Brazil.

Peperomia transparens is a branching, succulent, and rooting plant. The leaves alternate, having a long stalk that is slightly above the base. The leaf is ovate or subrounded-ovate, acute, very tender, membranous, subeuplicate beneath, and glabrous. Above at the margins, it is tenderly hairy, five-nerved, with having a very long pedunculated catkins. The bracts are pedunculated. The ovary is ovate with a stigma at the tip.

In terms of parts, Peperomia pellucida is similar but the structure of the flowers is far different.

The petioles are glabrous, dilated at the base being 8-12 cm long. The leaves are saturated green that is 4-4.5 cm long with its petioles being inserted 5-8 mm above the base, equilateral, 5 or almost 7-nerved with the middle nerve drawn to the apex, the rest often bifid and anastomosing with red and red reticulately. The middle lamina has few veins from the middle of the nerve. The peduncles of the catkins are usually longer and glabrous. The catkins are 4-5 cm long, fleshy, succulent. The flowers are indeed crowded when they emerge, but soon become very distant.

== Taxonomy and naming ==
It was described in 1847 by Friedrich Anton Wilhelm Miquel in Linnaea, from specimens collected by Carl Friedrich Philipp von Martius. It got its name from the description of its leaves, which means 3-leafed.

== Distribution and habitat ==
It is found in parts of South America, specifically Brazil, French Guiana, and Suriname. It grows on a lithophyte environment and grows on wet tropical biomes.

== Conservation ==
This species is assessed as Not Threatened, in a preliminary report.
