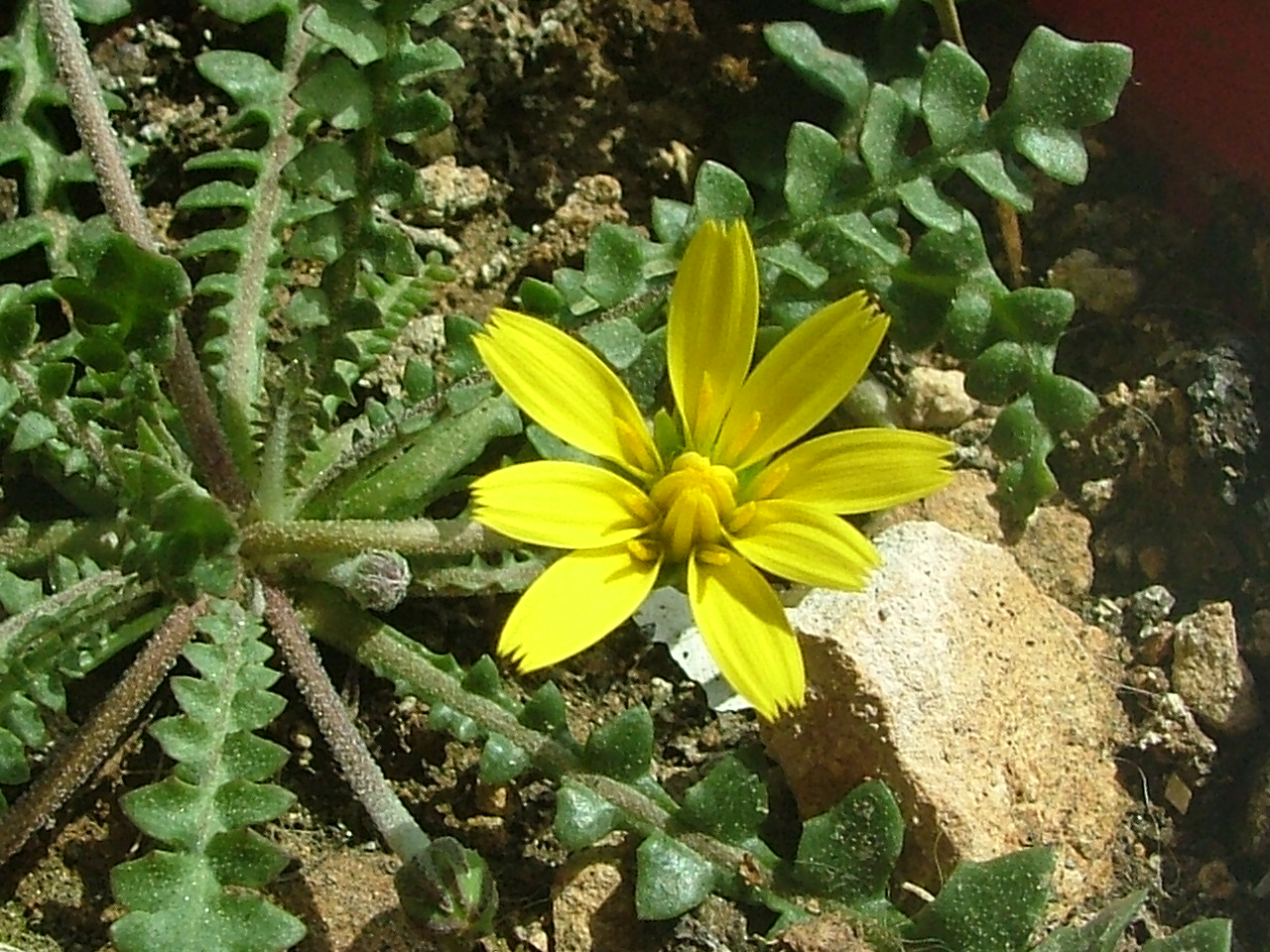

Conservation status
- Data Deficient (IUCN 3.1)

Scientific classification
- Kingdom: Plantae
- Clade: Tracheophytes
- Clade: Angiosperms
- Clade: Eudicots
- Clade: Asterids
- Order: Asterales
- Family: Asteraceae
- Genus: Hyoseris
- Species: H. frutescens

Binomial name
- Hyoseris frutescens Brullo & Pavone

= Hyoseris frutescens =

Species of flowering plant

Hyoseris frutescens is a species of flowering plant called Żigland t'Għawdex in Maltese and Maltese Hyoseris or Gozo Hyoseris in English. This species is endemic to the Maltese islands, where it is frequent and widespread in Gozo but rare in Malta. It was first discovered on Gozo, hence its second English name, then later found on the larger island Malta, in three separate localities. Its distribution range covers the entire western half of the perimeter on the island of Gozo, while on the island of Malta it is found on pocket isolated populations along the western cliffs of the island. It occurs in habitats such as cliffs, coastal garigue, rubble walls and boulder screes, and mainly in shady areas. The Maltese Hyoseris is one of the most archaic species in its genus to date. It is easy to cultivate by seed and it flowers all year round, but mostly in Spring and early Summer. Seeds are small achenes each with a pappus and are distributed by wind. It is a perennial species.

The leaves are succulent, similarly fleshy lobed to Hyoseris lucida, but it has more lobes on each leaf and they are less pointy. The flowers very similar to those of H. lucida, but larger, about the same size as those of H. radiata. Flowering stalks are greenish, unlike those of the previously two mentioned species.

It is a legally protected plant (Maltese Legal Notice 311/2006) and has a restricted distribution, though it is quite frequent at the coastal perimeter of the island of Gozo (2nd largest island of the Maltese archipelago).

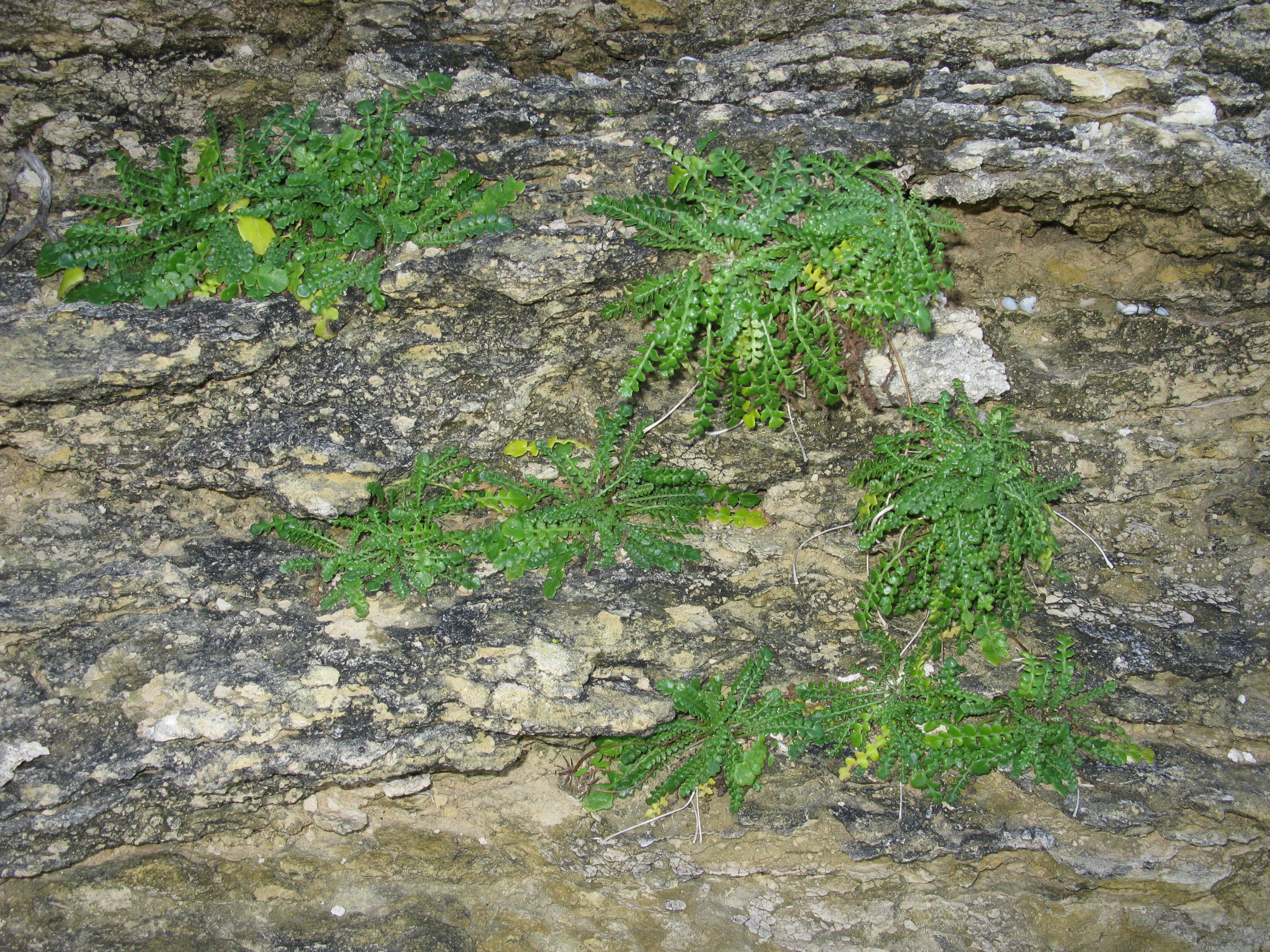
Habitat - crevices and pockets in coralline limestone rock faces

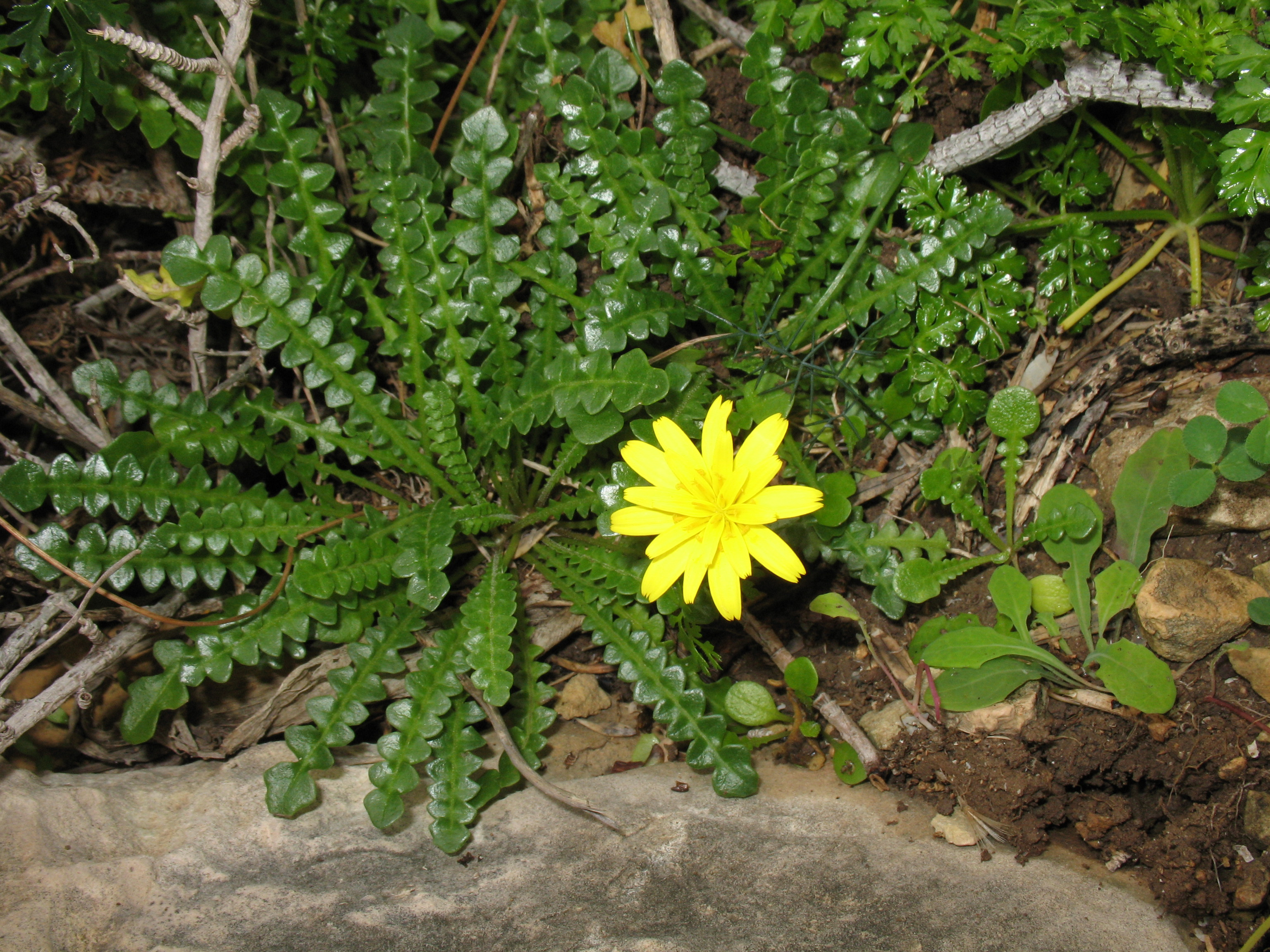
Typical specimen with zig-zag leaf lobes and yellow composite flowers

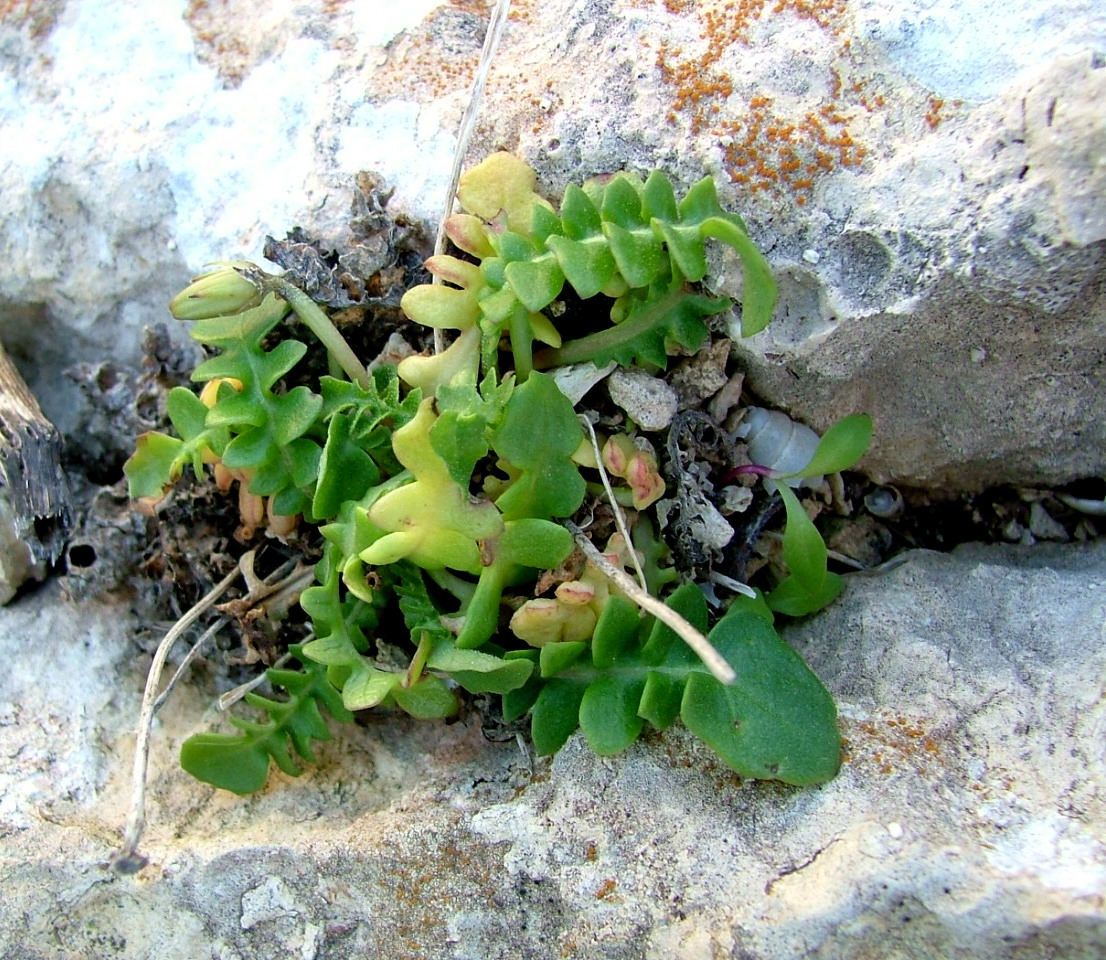
Gozo Hyoseris growing from rock crevices

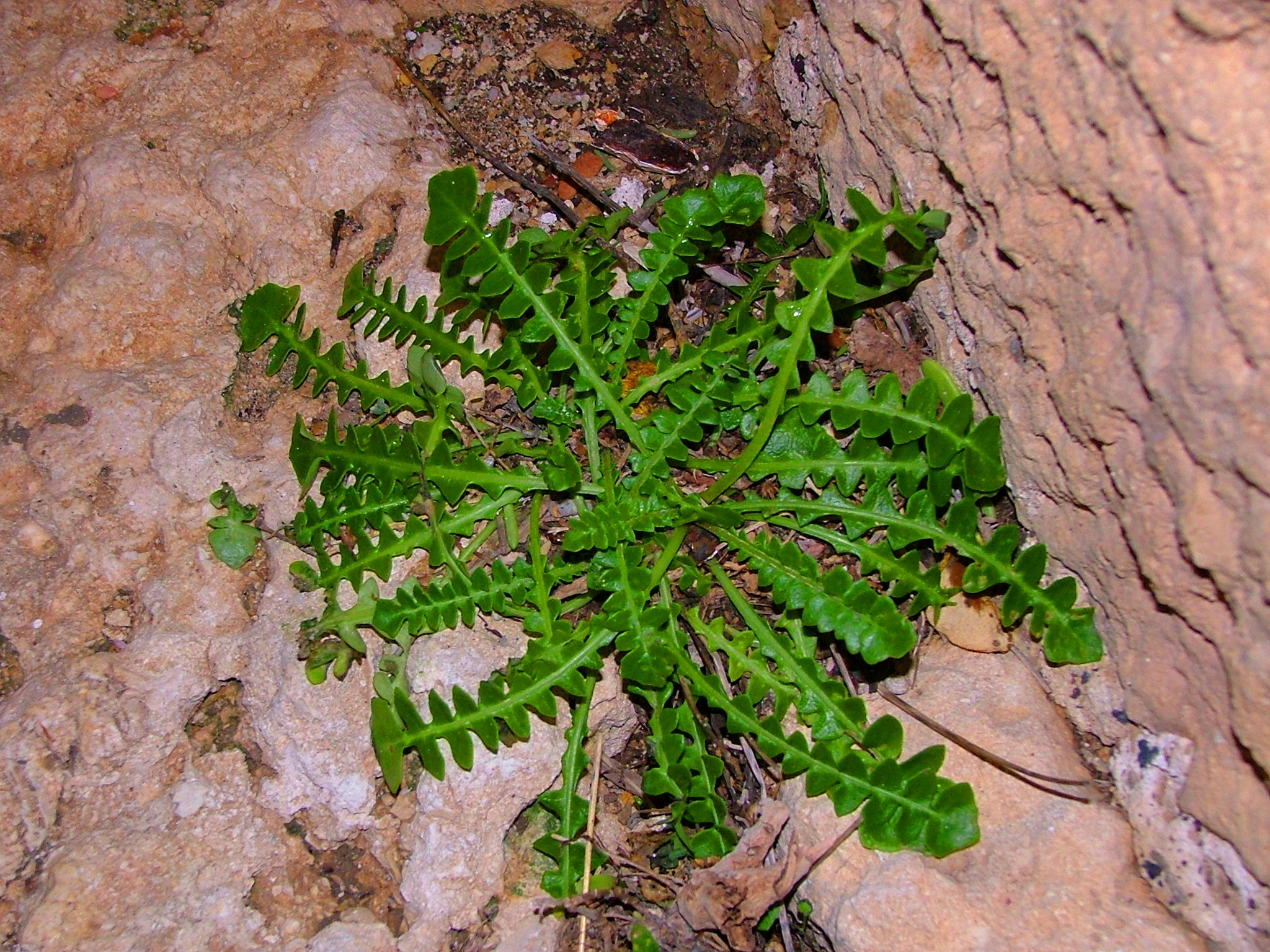
Gozo Hyoseris in a damp habitat
