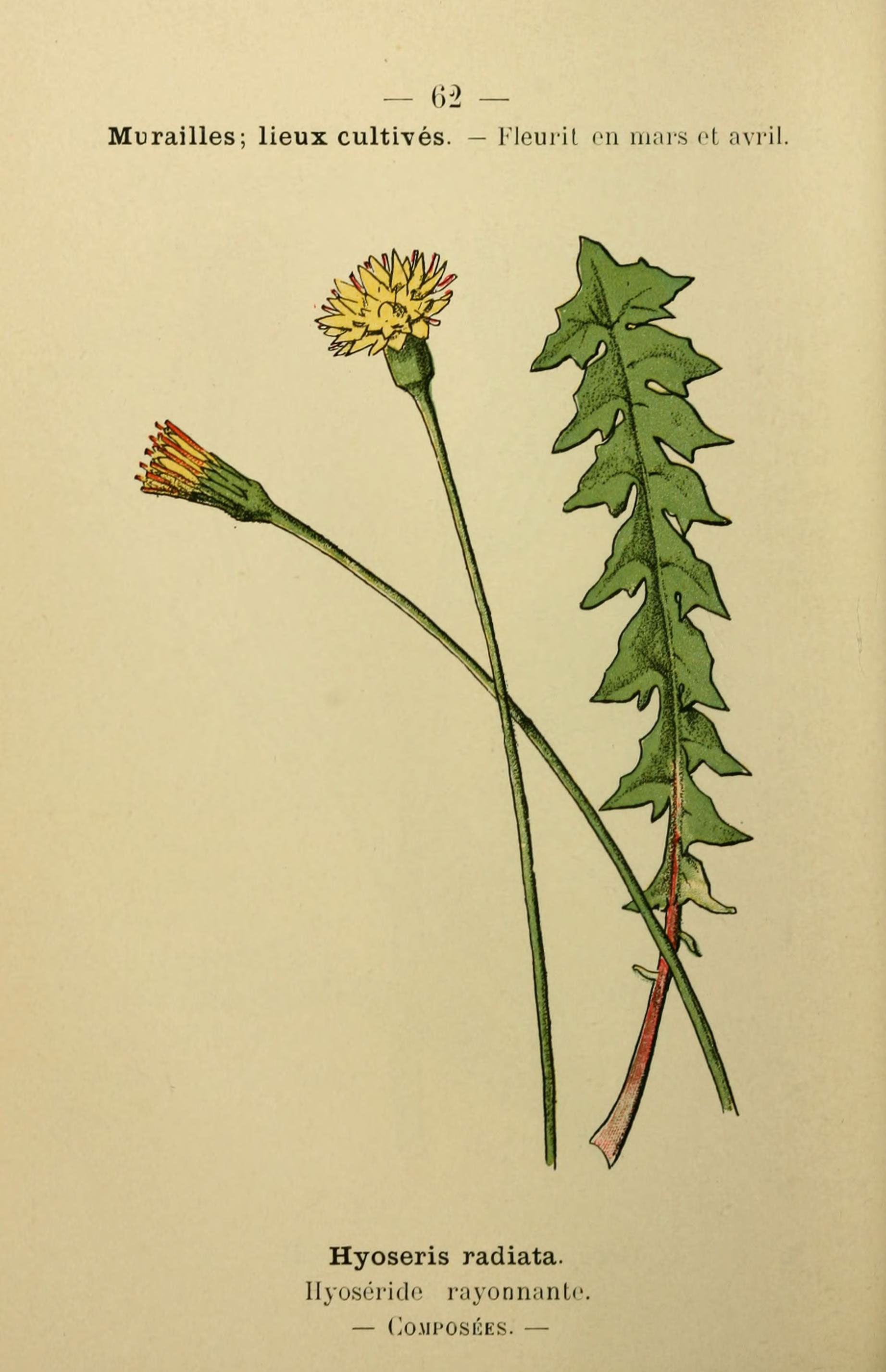
- Hyoseris radiata

Scientific classification
- Kingdom: Plantae
- Clade: Tracheophytes
- Clade: Angiosperms
- Clade: Eudicots
- Clade: Asterids
- Order: Asterales
- Family: Asteraceae
- Subfamily: Cichorioideae
- Tribe: Cichorieae
- Subtribe: Hyoseridinae
- Genus: Hyoseris; L.

Type species
- Hyoseris radiata L.

Synonyms
- Bohadschia F.W.Schmidt; Achyrastrum Neck.; Thlipsocarpus Kunze

= Hyoseris =

Genus of flowering plants

Hyoseris is a genus of flowering plants in the family Asteraceae. It is native to the Mediterranean region from Portugal to Israel, with a few species extending as far north as Germany.

Species

- Hyoseris × knochei - Balearic Islands
- Hyoseris blechnoides - Algeria
- Hyoseris canadensis
- Hyoseris crepoides - Sicily
- Hyoseris frutescens - Gozo, Malta
- Hyoseris integrifolia
- Hyoseris lucida - Algeria, Egypt, Libya, Spain, Greece
- Hyoseris muricata
- Hyoseris nana
- Hyoseris radiata - from Spain to Greece
- Hyoseris scabra - from Spain to Turkey
- Hyoseris taurina - Italy
