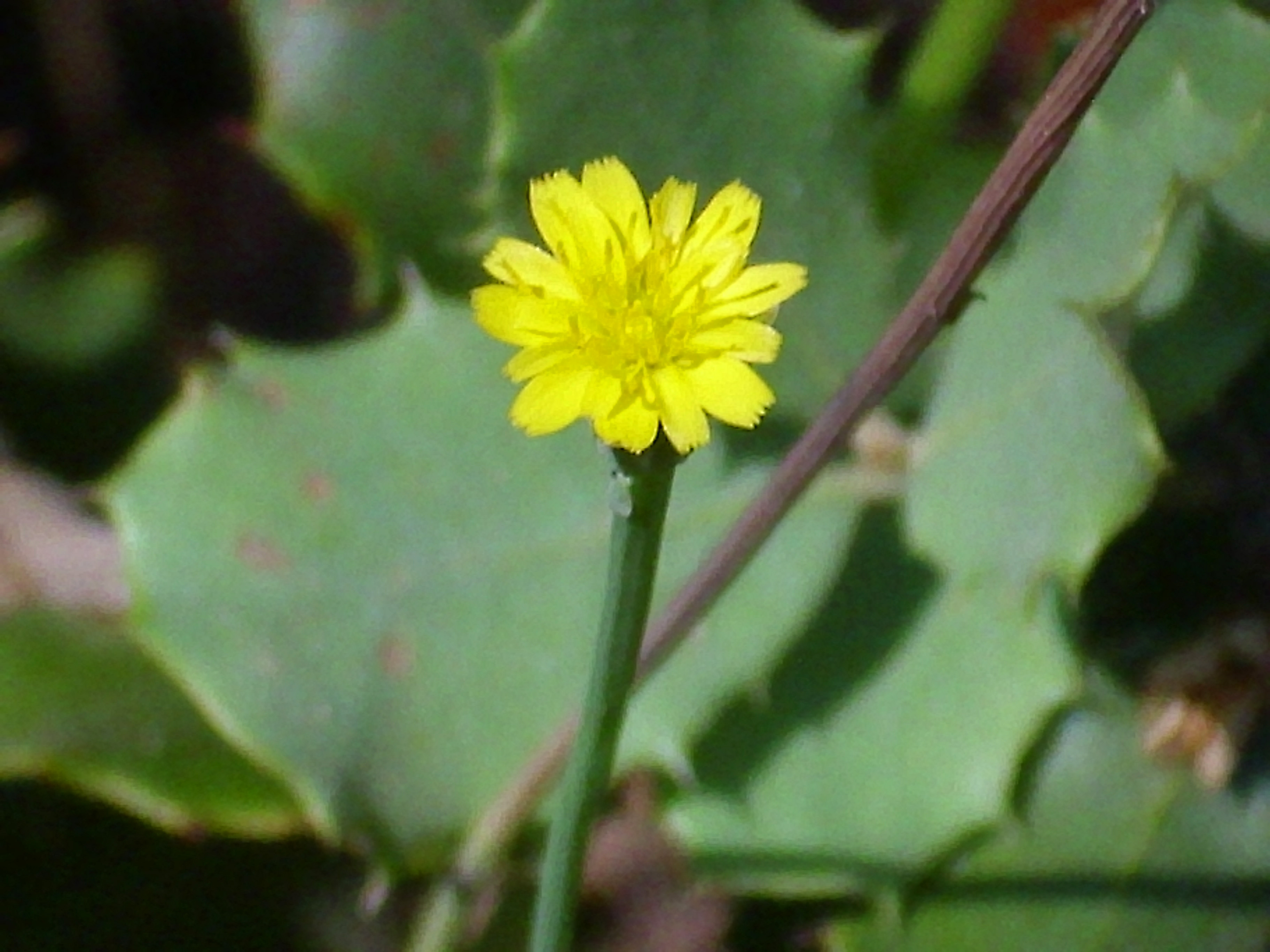

Scientific classification
- Kingdom: Plantae
- Clade: Tracheophytes
- Clade: Angiosperms
- Clade: Eudicots
- Clade: Asterids
- Order: Asterales
- Family: Asteraceae
- Genus: Hyoseris
- Species: H. scabra

Binomial name
- Hyoseris scabra L.

= Hyoseris scabra =

Species of plant

Hyoseris scabra is a species of annual herb in the family Asteraceae. They have a self-supporting growth form. Individuals can grow to 5 cm tall.

== Sources ==
This article incorporates text from a free content work. Licensed under CC0 (license statement/permission). Text taken from Hyoseris scabra. Encyclopedia of Life.
