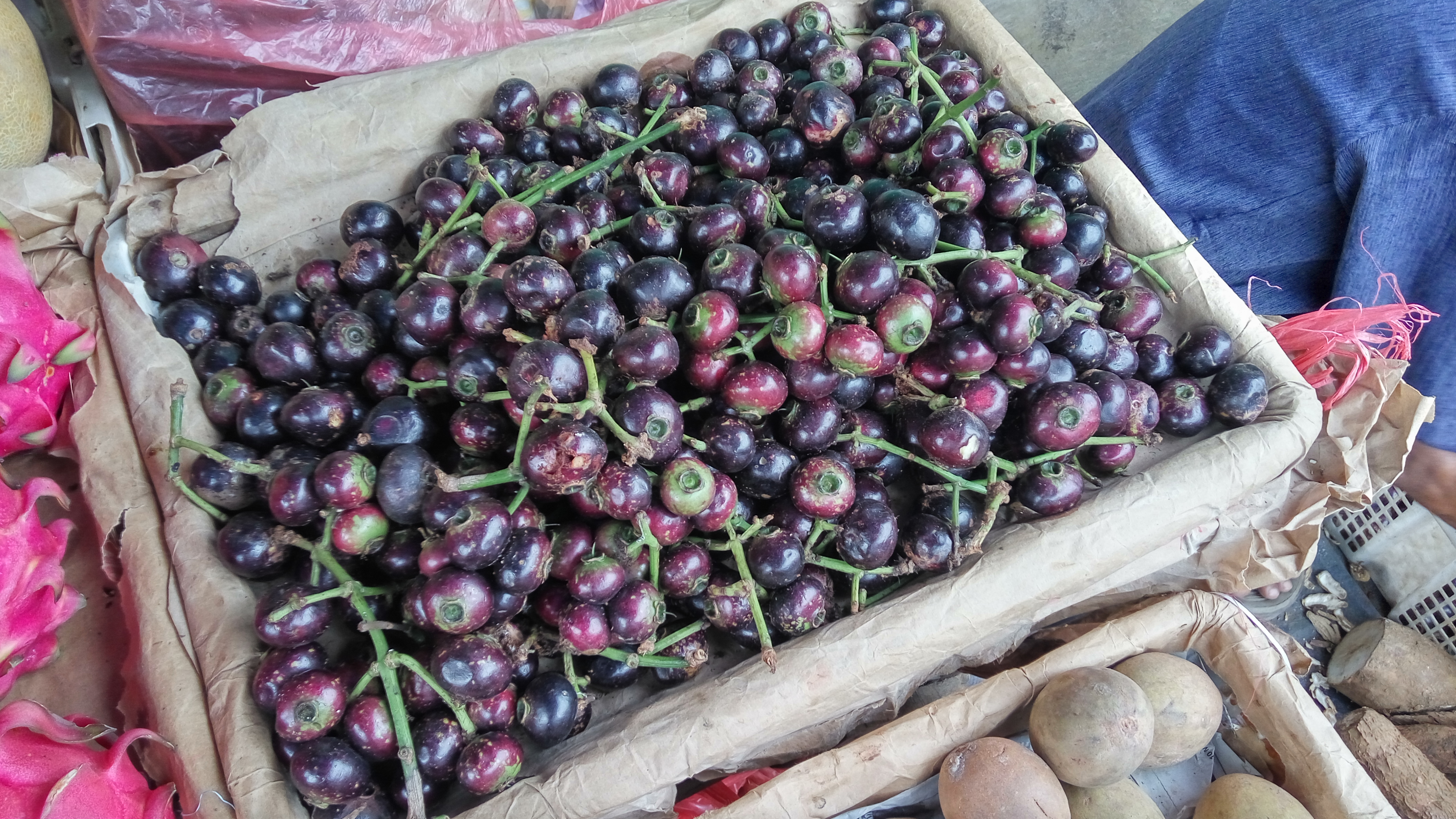
- Fruit for sale in a local market
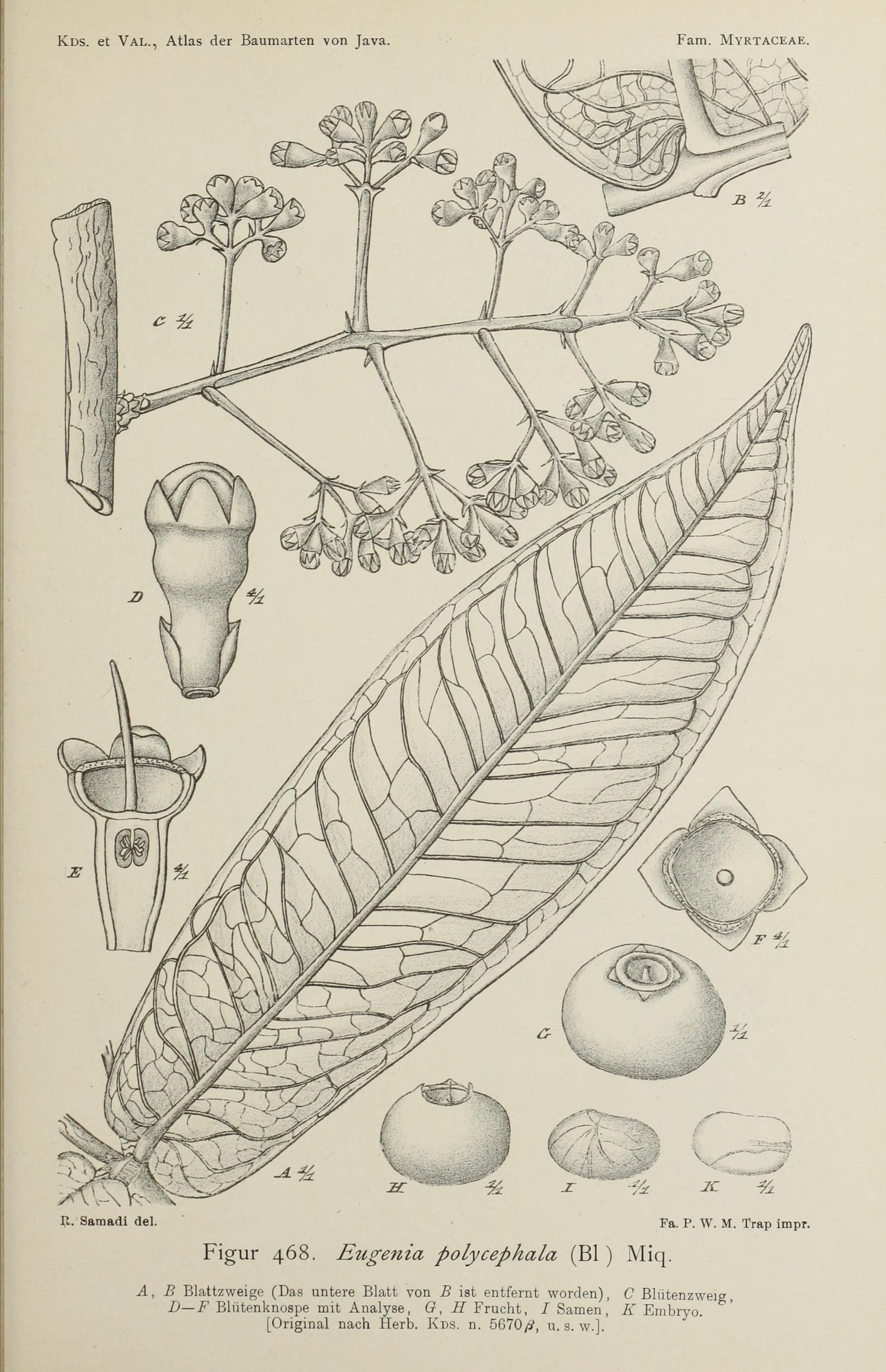
- Botanical illustration (fig. 468)

Conservation status
- Near Threatened (IUCN 3.1)

Scientific classification
- Kingdom: Plantae
- Clade: Tracheophytes
- Clade: Angiosperms
- Clade: Eudicots
- Clade: Rosids
- Order: Myrtales
- Family: Myrtaceae
- Genus: Syzygium
- Species: S. polycephalum

Binomial name
- Syzygium polycephalum (Miq.) Merr. & L.M.Perry

Synonyms
- Eugenia polycephala Miq.; Jambosa cauliflora DC.; Jambosa polycephala (Miq.) Miq.; Myrtus cauliflora Blume; Syzygium cauliflorum (DC.) Bennet

= Syzygium polycephalum =

Species of plant

Syzygium polycephalum, the gowok, is a species of flowering plant in the family Myrtaceae. It is native to western and central Malesia; Sumatra, Borneo, Java, the Lesser Sunda Islands, and Sulawesi. A tree reaching 8 to 20 m (26 to 66 ft), it is typically found in secondary forests at elevations from 200 to 1,800 m (700 to 5,900 ft). Its fruit and its young violet-colored leaves are edible and gathered from the wild and from cultivated specimens by local peoples. In particular, the fruit is used to make a "highly esteemed" jelly. It has been assessed as Near Threatened due to deforestation.

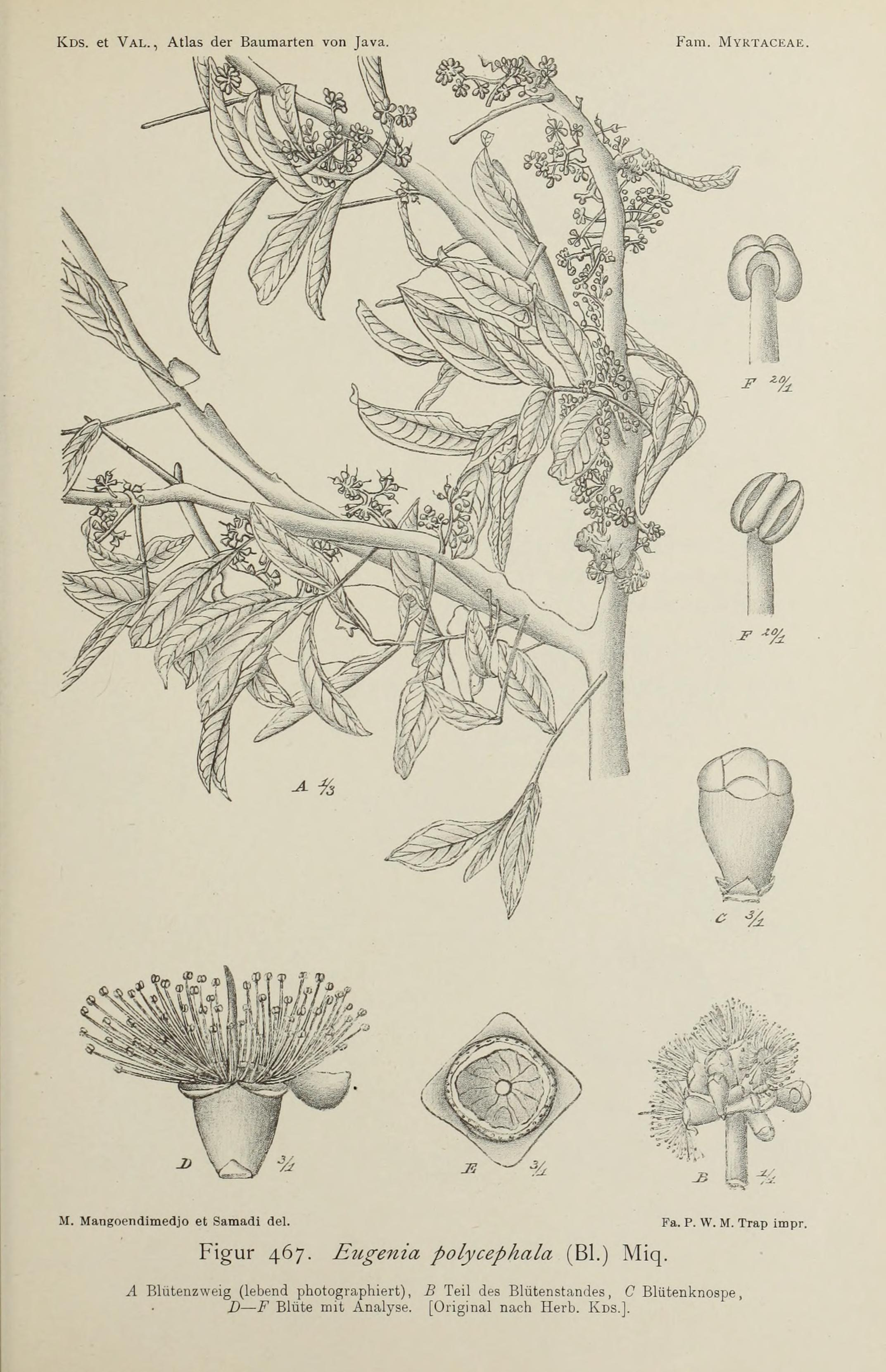
Botanical illustration (fig. 467)
