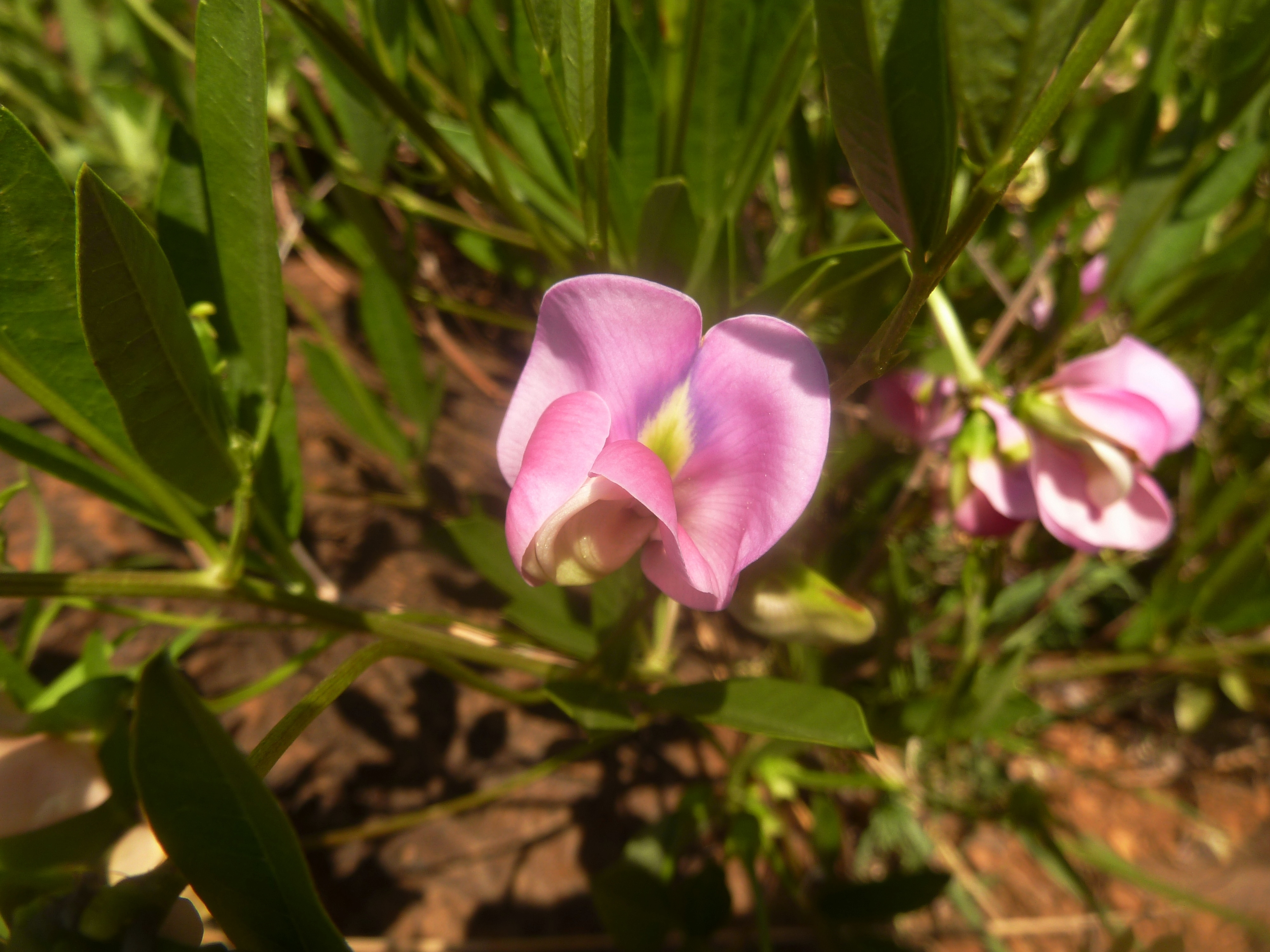
- Sphenostylis angustifolia

Scientific classification
- Kingdom: Plantae
- Clade: Embryophytes
- Clade: Tracheophytes
- Clade: Spermatophytes
- Clade: Angiosperms
- Clade: Eudicots
- Clade: Rosids
- Order: Fabales
- Family: Fabaceae
- Subfamily: Faboideae
- Tribe: Phaseoleae
- Subtribe: Phaseolinae
- Genus: Sphenostylis; E.Mey. (1836)

Species
- 7; see text

= Sphenostylis =

Genus of legumes

Sphenostylis is a genus of flowering plants in the legume family, Fabaceae. It includes seven species of prostrate, climbing or erect herbs or subshrubs. They are native to sub-Saharan Africa, where they grow in seasonally-dry tropical and subtropical open forest, woodland, bushland and thicket, wooded grassland, and grassland, mainly in the Zambezian and Sudanian regions. It belongs to the subfamily Faboideae. Sphenostylis contains several species useful as food sources including Sphenostylis stenocarpa. Sphenostylis stenocarpa is characterized by its fruit (legume) and stipulated leaves.

== Species ==
Seven species are accepted:

- Sphenostylis angustifolia Sond.
- Sphenostylis briartii (De Wild.) Baker f.
- Sphenostylis erecta (Baker f.) Hutch. ex Baker f.
- Sphenostylis marginata E.Mey.
- Sphenostylis schweinfurthii Harms
- Sphenostylis stenocarpa (Hochst. ex A.Rich.) Harms
- Sphenostylis zimbabweensis Mithen

== Cultivation ==
Three species of Sphenostylis are important food sources in Africa, including the under-exploited African Yam Bean or Sphenostylis stenocarpa, which can be consumed as dry cooked seeds or tuber. Seeds are usually added to soups, made into sauces, or milled into flour. The African yam bean is grown in countries of West Africa such as Cameroon, Cote d’Ivoire, Ghana, Nigeria, and Togo. The tuber grows as the root source, while the yam bean develops into the pod containing 20-30 seeds found above the ground. These seeds can be found in colors including brown, black, and red varieties. It grows as a vine to heights of about 3m and produces brightly colored flowers in 100–150 days.

This yam bean is a very useful crop because of the extreme conditions it can thrive in, including high rainfall, acidity, and infertile soils, and its resistance to several major crop pests. It is also useful because of its high nitrogen-fixing ability, replenishing soil it is grown in of its nitrogen. In West Africa, the seeds of the African yam bean are primarily used, while in the East and Central regions of Africa, the tubers are primarily used.

== Uses ==
The African yam bean is a legume that is rich in protein and starch and an important source of calcium and amino acids. It contains amino acids that are important for the development in early pre-school and school aged children and also those required for adults. The yam bean is a useful source of nutrients for many African communities with a nutritional value comparable to that of the soybean, although the cooking time for the yam bean is much longer (4–6 hours). However, some health problems have been discovered in relation to consumption of these beans including flatulence, stomach cramps, diarrhea and dizziness. These problems result from the way they are usually cooked.

Although little research has been devoted to this plant, some important studies have been conducted including one on how to relieve these health problems. Studies show problems are resolved when the yam bean seeds are exposed to pre-cooking treatments such as lactic acid fermented using a low-level technological process. The fermentation method also reduces the amount of time and energy to produce a viable food product from the yam bean. In addition to research on cooking treatments, some research has been conducted on the genetic variability of the plant. The yam bean has a high level of genetic variability, which will be useful during the hybridization of the plant in order to increase food production and sustainability. While the yam bean has been subject to cultivation, there has been little artificial selection on specific traits. If the yam bean could be grown in large quantities, this crop could be the important source of protein needed by the people of sub-Saharan Africa.
