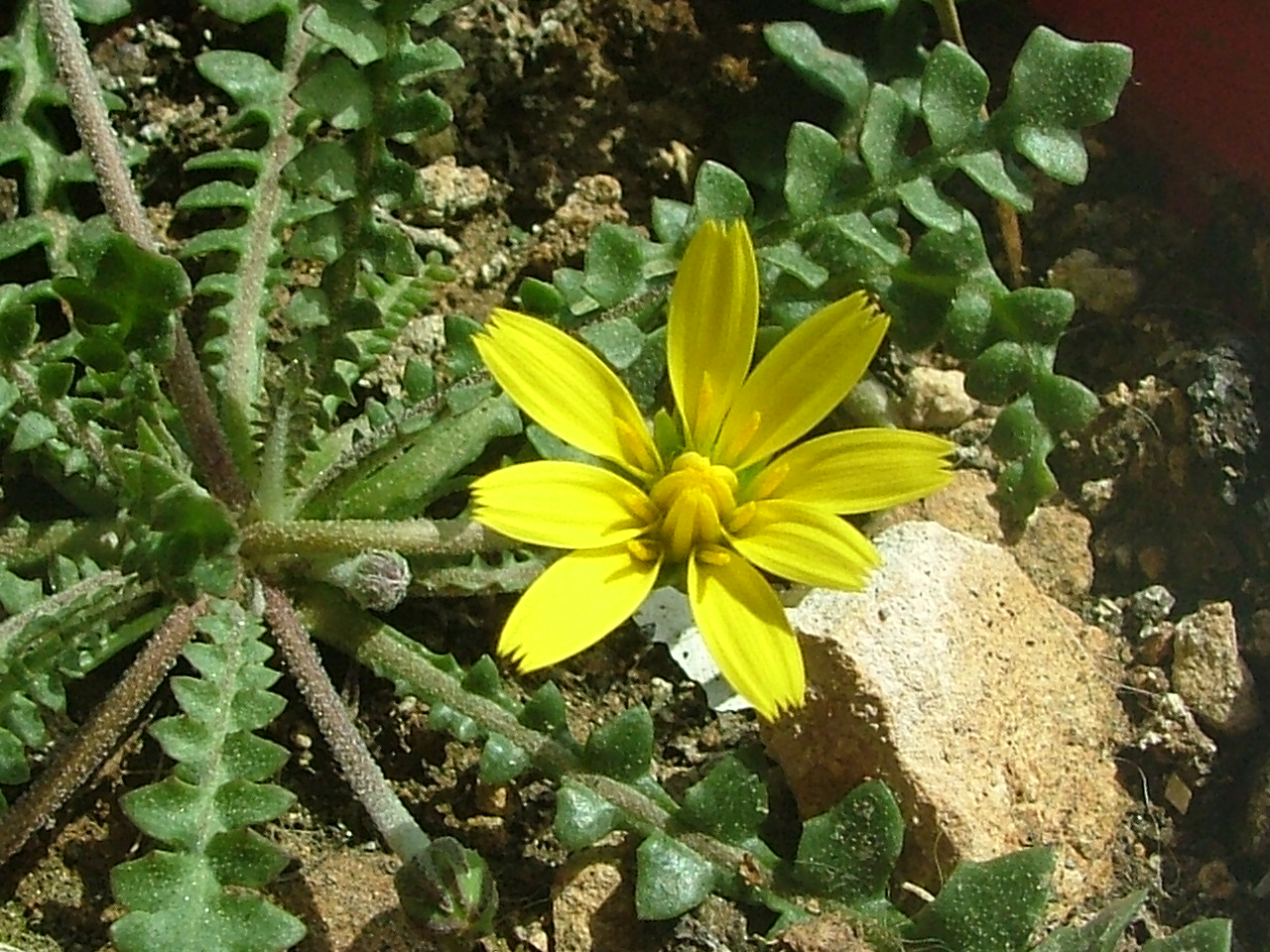

Scientific classification
- Kingdom: Plantae
- Clade: Tracheophytes
- Clade: Angiosperms
- Clade: Eudicots
- Clade: Asterids
- Order: Asterales
- Family: Asteraceae
- Genus: Hyoseris
- Species: H. radiata

Binomial name
- Hyoseris radiata L.

= Hyoseris radiata =

Species of plant

Hyoseris radiata is a species of herb in the family Asteraceae. They have a self-supporting growth form and broad leaves. Individuals can grow to 23 cm.

== Sources ==
This article incorporates text from a free content work. Licensed under CC0 (license statement/permission). Text taken from Hyoseris radiata. Encyclopedia of Life.
