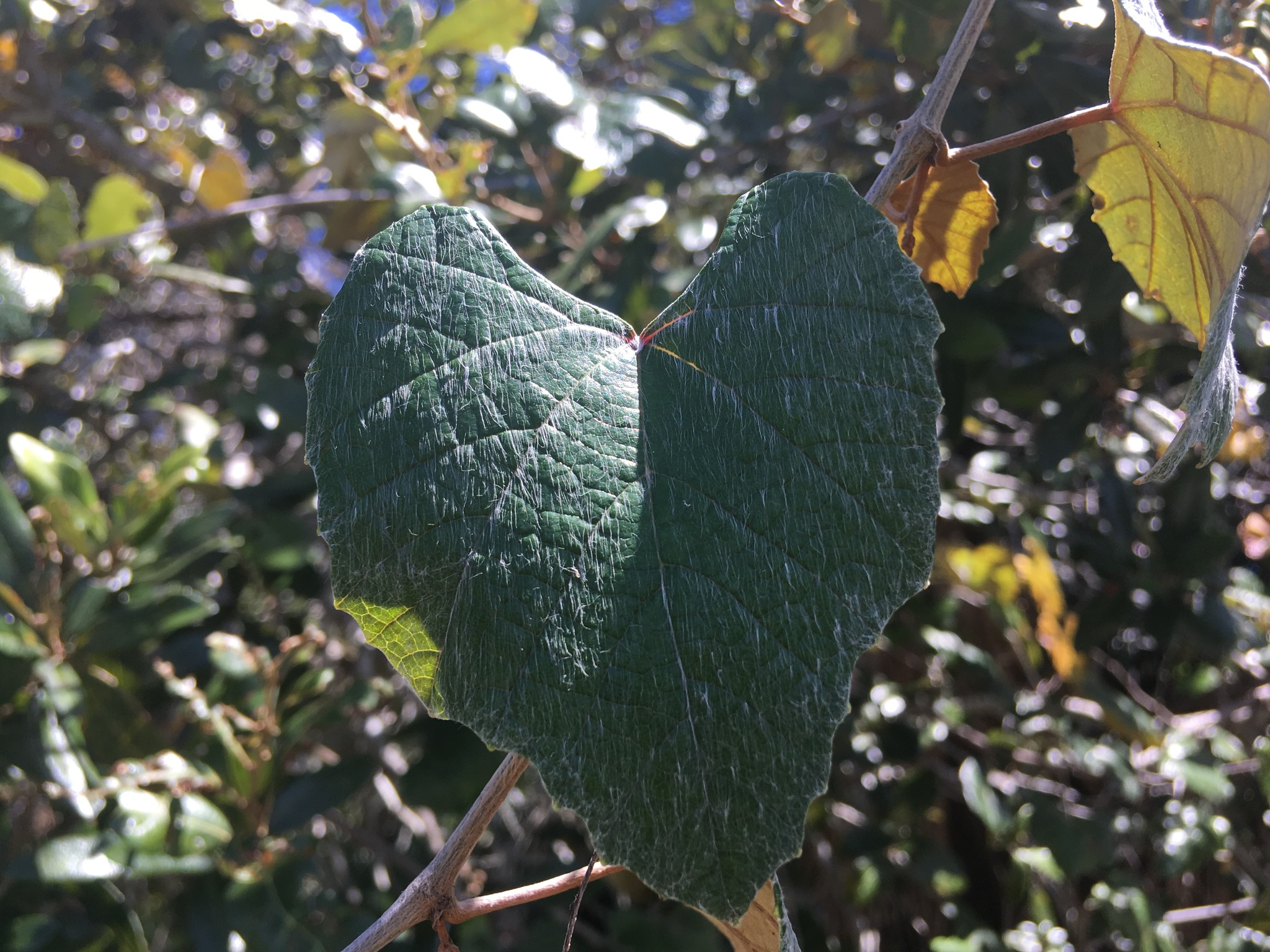
- Bear grape at Merritt Island National Wildlife Refuge in Brevard County, Florida

Conservation status
- Apparently Secure (NatureServe)

Scientific classification
- Kingdom: Plantae
- Clade: Tracheophytes
- Clade: Angiosperms
- Clade: Eudicots
- Clade: Rosids
- Order: Vitales
- Family: Vitaceae
- Genus: Vitis
- Species: V. shuttleworthii

Binomial name
- Vitis shuttleworthii House

Synonyms
- Vitis coriacea Shuttlew. ex Planch. (1887) not Michx. (1803)

= Vitis shuttleworthii =

Bear grape

Species of grapevine

Vitis shuttleworthii is a North American liana (woody vine) in the grape family commonly known as the calloose grape or bear grape (alternatively referred as calusa grape). The name refers to the group of Native American people that resided in southwest Florida, the Calusa. It is native to south and central Florida, with isolated populations in southern Alabama.

The species was first described in 1887 using the name Vitis coriacea. However, this name had already been used for an Asian plant, so it was necessary to coin another name of the American species, now called V. shuttleworthii.

== Gallery ==
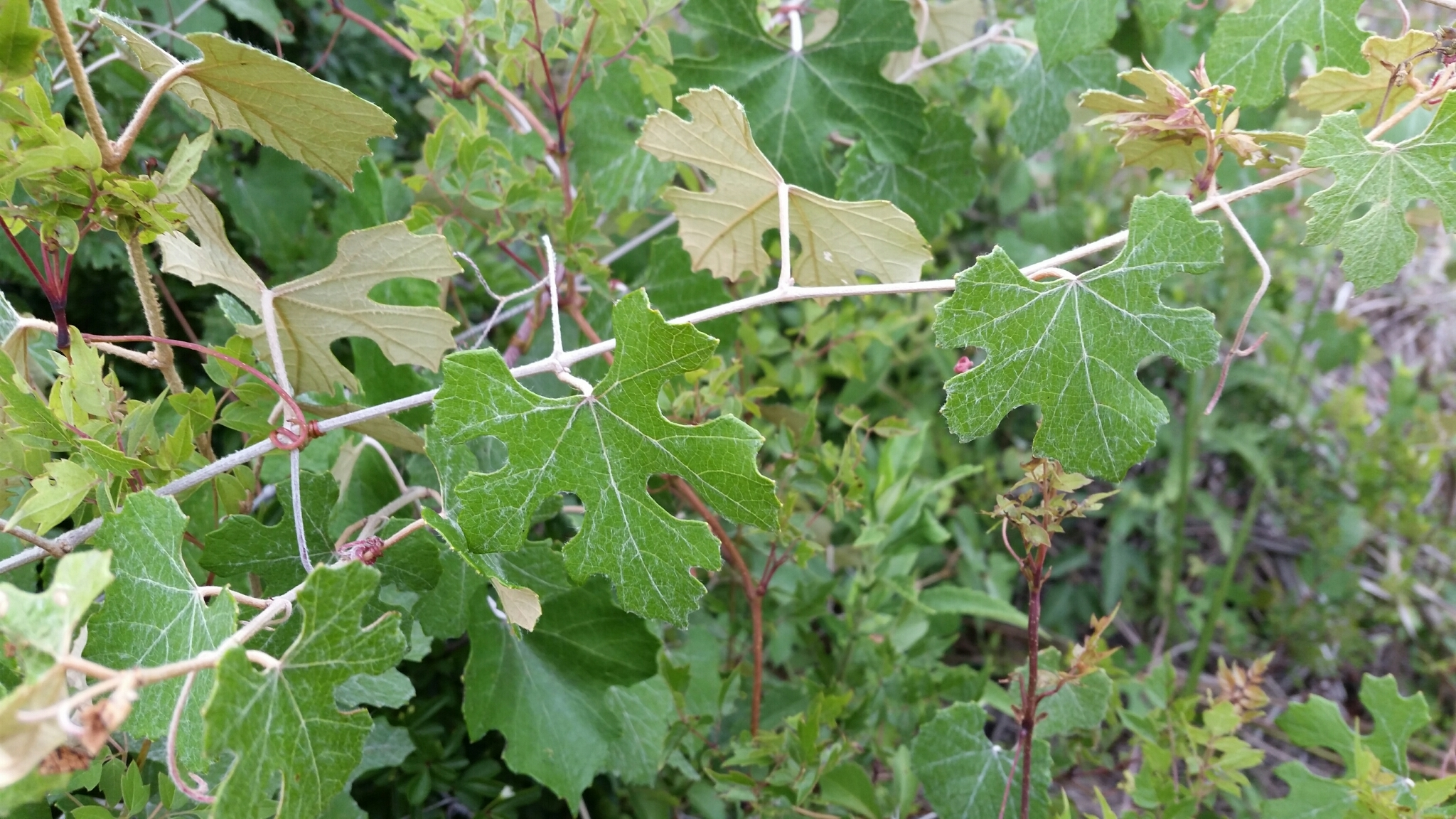

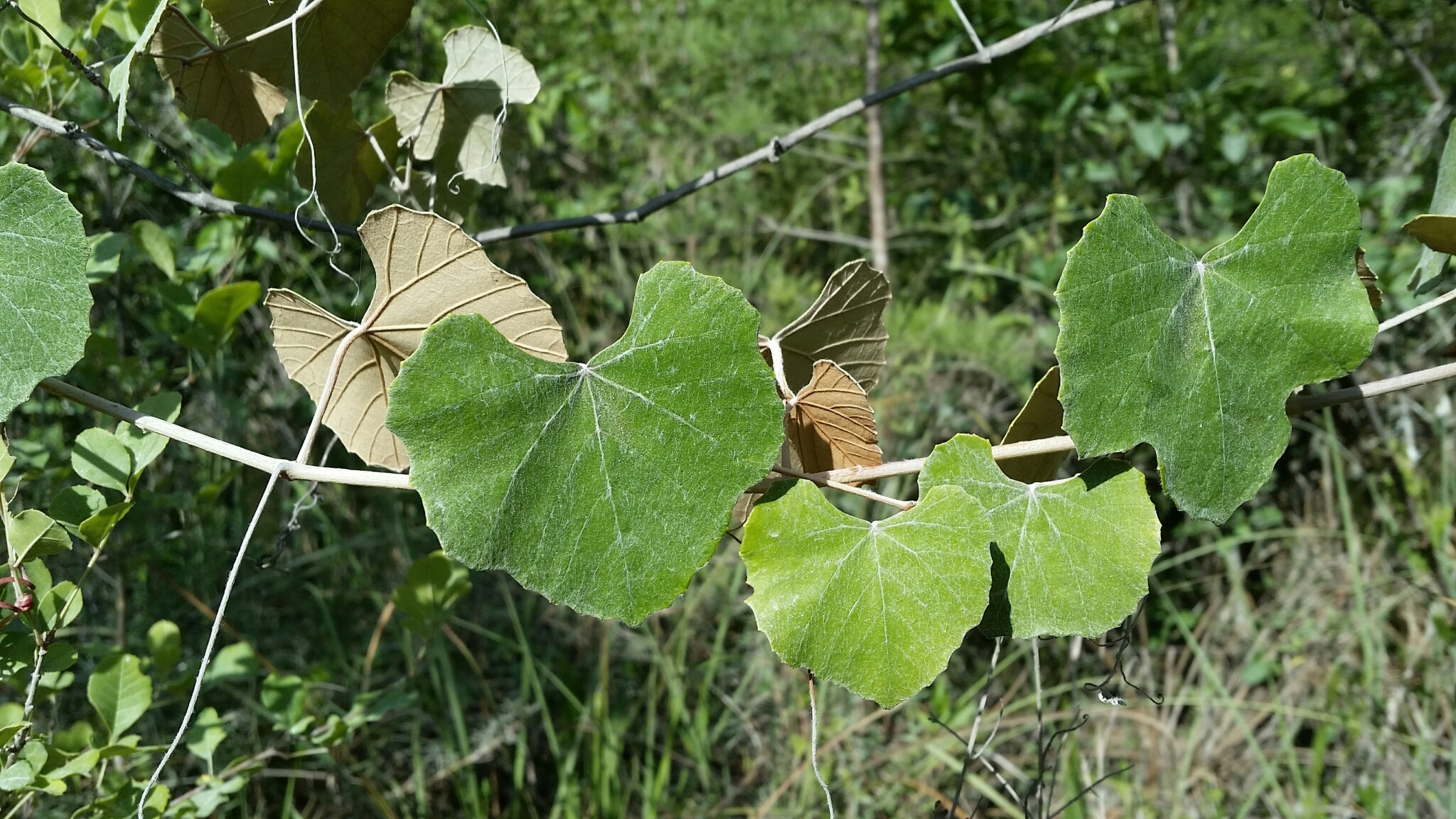
