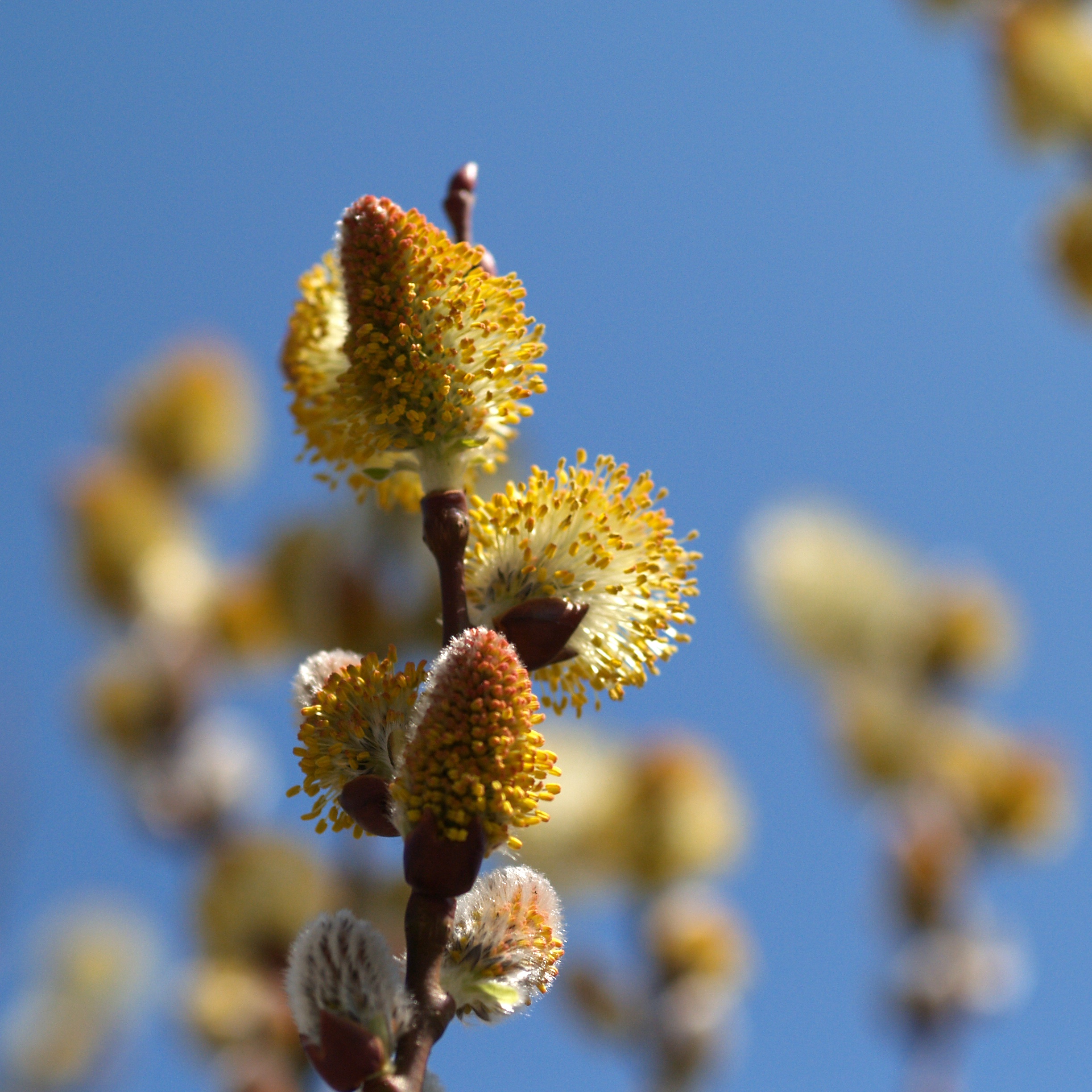

Scientific classification
- Kingdom: Plantae
- Clade: Tracheophytes
- Clade: Angiosperms
- Clade: Eudicots
- Clade: Rosids
- Order: Malpighiales
- Family: Salicaceae
- Genus: Salix
- Species: S. gracilistyla

Binomial name
- Salix gracilistyla Miq.

= Salix gracilistyla =

Species of shrub

Salix gracilistyla is a species of willow native to Japan, Korea and China known in English as the rose-gold pussy willow.

It is a deciduous shrub that reaches a height of 1–6 m.

== Cultivars ==
'Melanostachys', also known as the black pussy willow, is known for its jet-black male and female catkin blooms which appear in early spring. Its male catkins also have red anthers, which slowly turn soft yellow from pollen. It has gained the Royal Horticultural Society's Award of Garden Merit.

== Gallery ==
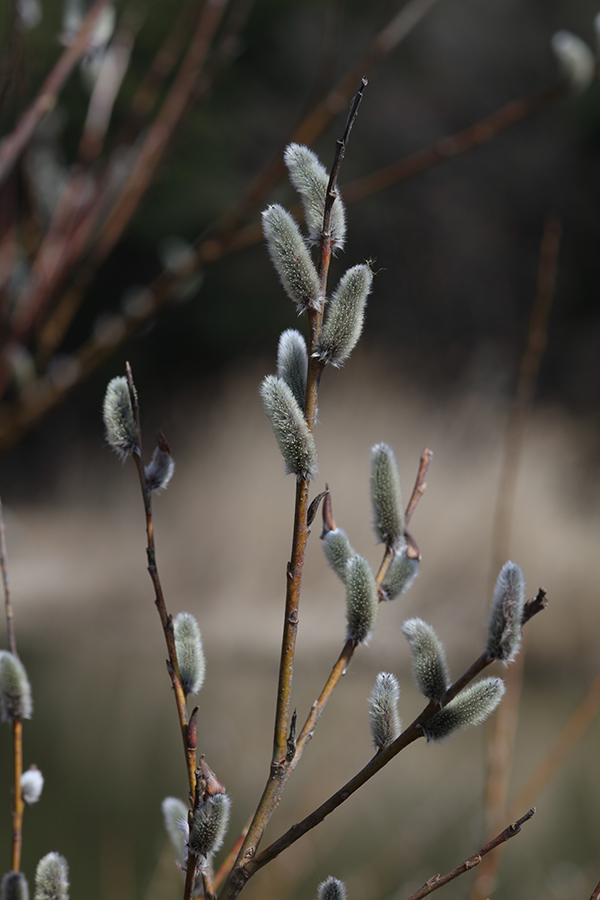
Female plant

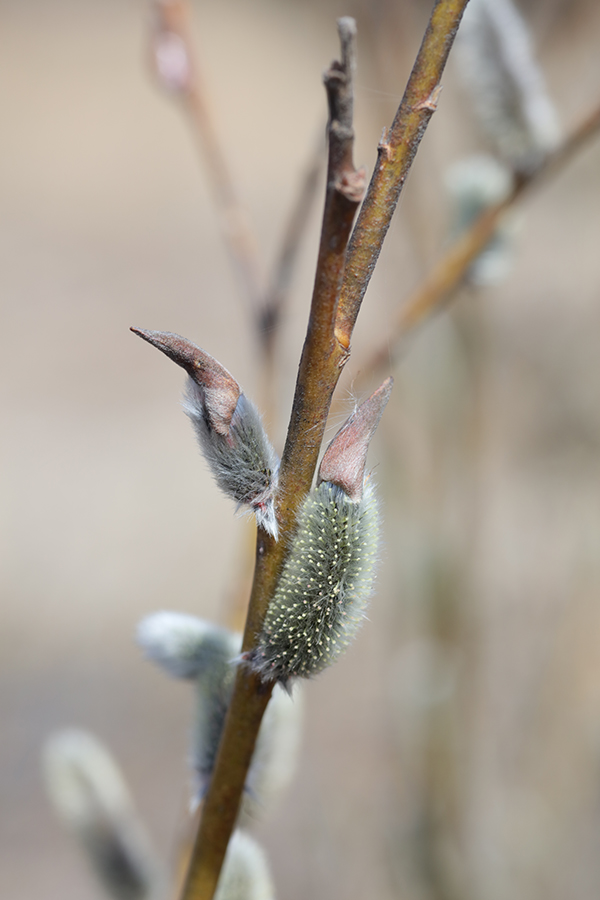
Female plant

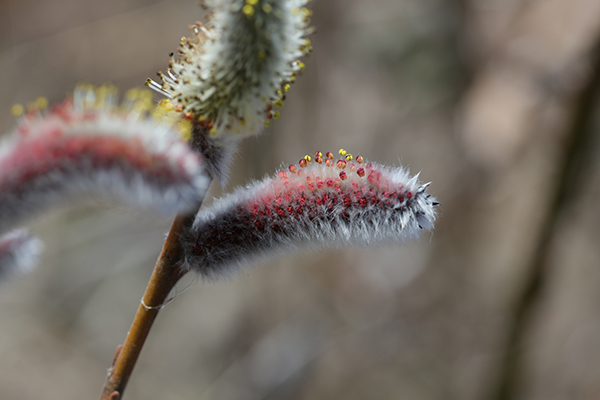
Male plant

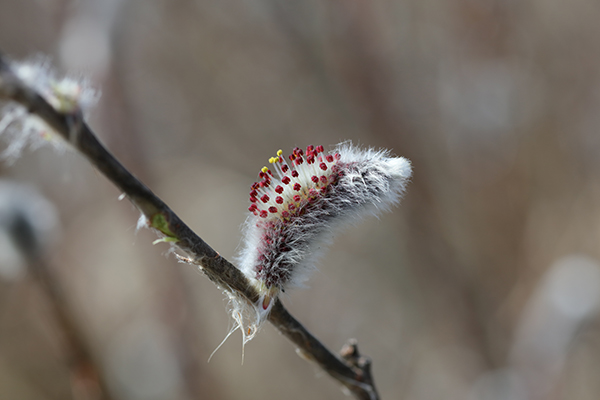
Male plant
