= Sphenostylis stenocarpa =

Scientific classification
- Kingdom: Plantae
- Clade: Tracheophytes
- Clade: Angiosperms
- Clade: Eudicots
- Clade: Rosids
- Order: Fabales
- Family: Fabaceae
- Subfamily: Faboideae
- Genus: Sphenostylis
- Species: S. stenocarpa

Binomial name
- Sphenostylis stenocarpa (Hochst. ex A.Rich.) Harms

Species of legume

Sphenostylis stenocarpa, the African yam bean, is a species of plant in the family Fabaceae which is native to Africa. It is an important source of food in many parts of Africa. The tubers are fried, boiled or roasted, and are higher than the seeds in protein.
