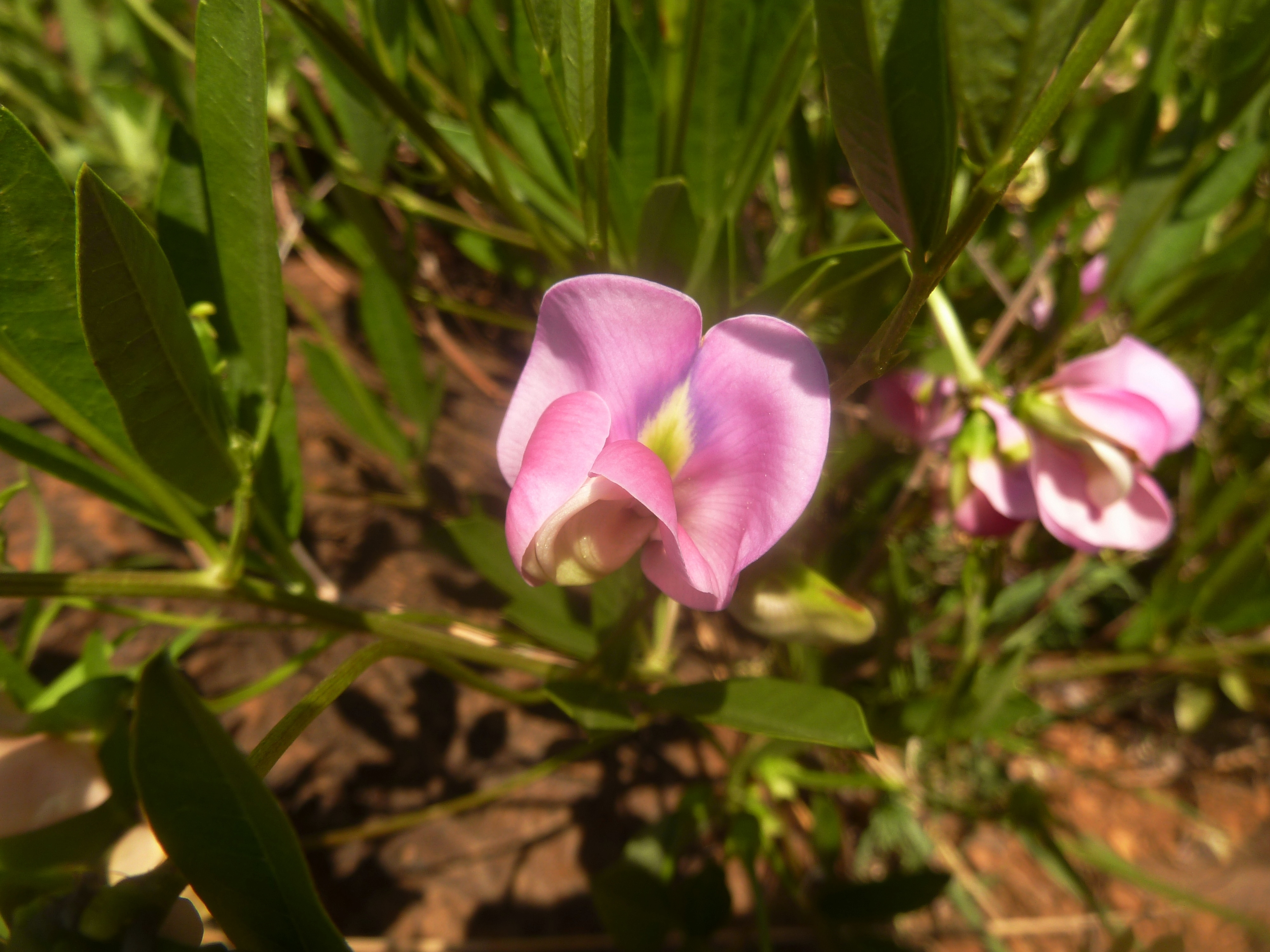

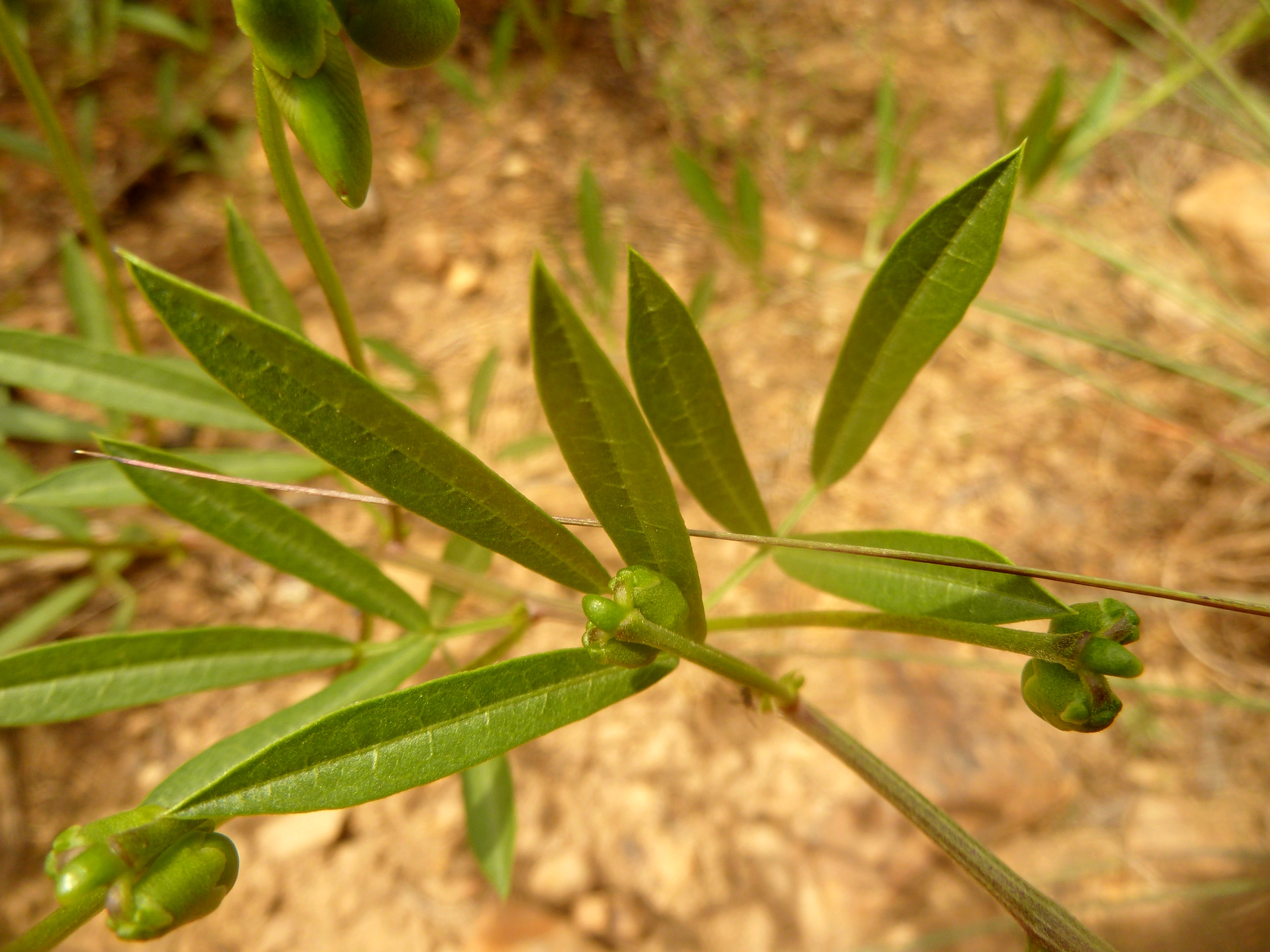

Scientific classification
- Kingdom: Plantae
- Clade: Tracheophytes
- Clade: Angiosperms
- Clade: Eudicots
- Clade: Rosids
- Order: Fabales
- Family: Fabaceae
- Subfamily: Faboideae
- Genus: Sphenostylis
- Species: S. angustifolia

Binomial name
- Sphenostylis angustifolia Sond.

= Sphenostylis angustifolia =

Species of legume

Sphenostylis angustifolia, commonly known as the wild sweet-pea, is a species of plant in the family Fabaceae, which is native to grassland regions of southern Africa.

== Description ==
Sphenostylis angustifolia, is a green perennial shrublet with an extensive woody rootstock that decorates the Highveld with its unusual pink flowers that are faintly aromatic. It is one of the many so-called pre-rain flowers which start flowering in early spring irrespective of rainfall.
