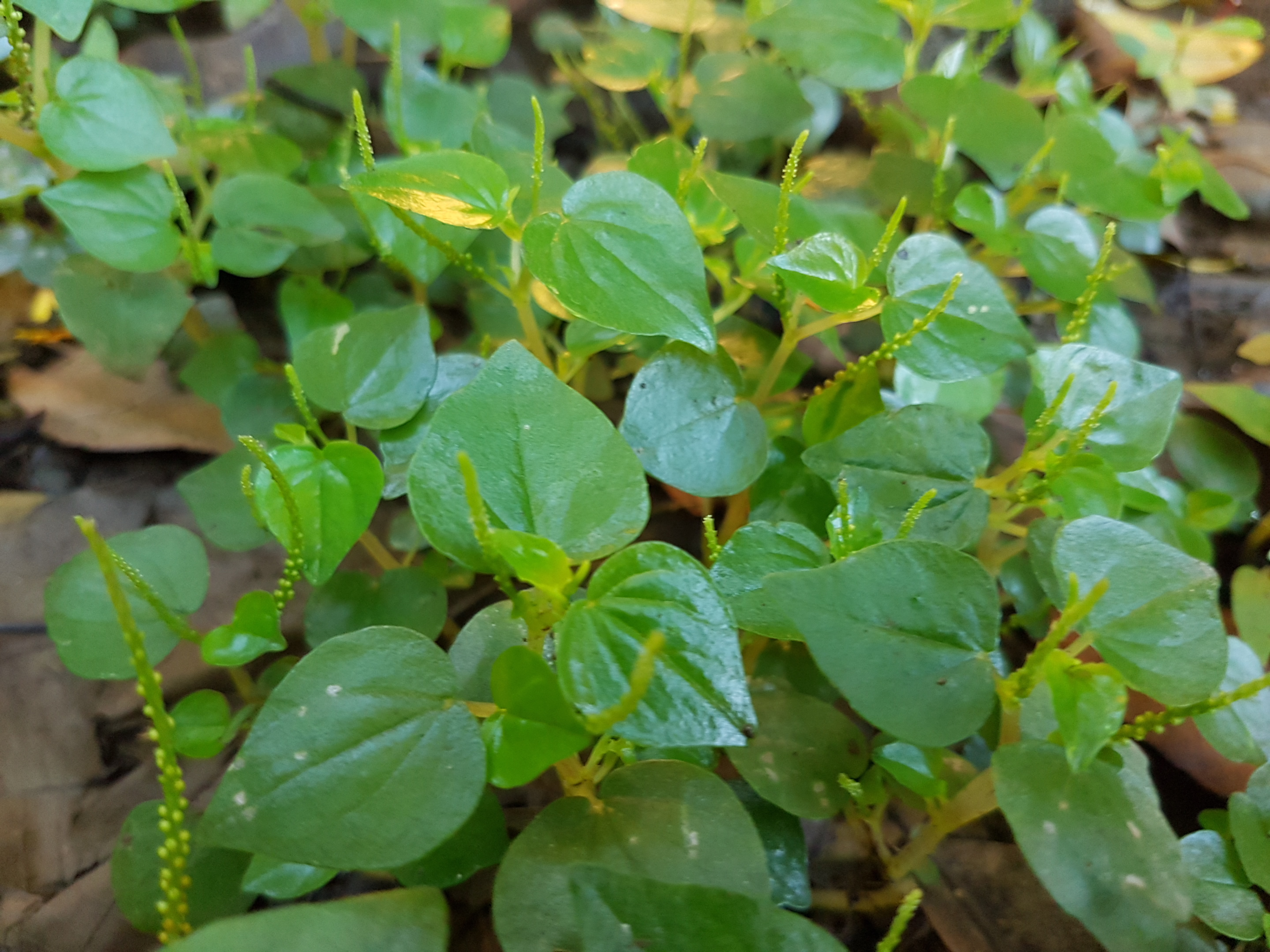

Scientific classification
- Kingdom: Plantae
- Clade: Embryophytes
- Clade: Tracheophytes
- Clade: Angiosperms
- Clade: Magnoliids
- Order: Piperales
- Family: Piperaceae
- Genus: Peperomia
- Species: P. pellucida

Binomial name
- Peperomia pellucida Kunth

Synonyms
- Piper concinnum Haw. Peperomia translucens Trel. Piper pellucidum L.

= Peperomia pellucida =

Species of flowering plant

Peperomia pellucida (also known by common names pepper elder, shining bush plant, crab claw herb, and man to man) is an annual, shallow-rooted herb, usually growing to a height of about 15 to 45 cm (6 to 18 inches), It is characterized by succulent stems, shiny, heart-shaped, fleshy leaves and tiny, dot-like seeds attached to several fruiting spikes. It has a mustard-like odor when crushed.

== Habitat ==
Flowering year-round, the plant is found in various shaded, damp habitats all over Asia and the Americas. It grows in clumps, thriving in loose, humid soils and a tropical to subtropical climate.

== Uses ==
Peperomia pellucida has been used as a food item as well as a medicinal herb. Although mostly grown for its ornamental foliage, the entire plant is edible, both cooked and raw.

== Pharmacology ==
The analgesic properties of the plant seem to be related to its effect on prostaglandin synthesis. It may have potential as a broad spectrum antibiotic, as demonstrated in tests against Staphylococcus aureus, Bacillus subtilis, Pseudomonas aeruginosa, and Escherichia coli. Chloroform extracts from dried leaves of P. pellucida have been shown to exhibit antifungal activity against Trichophyton mentagrophytes in vitro.

Anti-inflammatory activity (in paw edema) and analgesic activity has been demonstrated in rats and mice.

Although the plant can cause asthma-like symptoms in patients with known hypersensitivity reactions to the species, no clinical data have yet been reported on human toxicity.

== Traditional medicine ==
Ethnomedicinal uses for the plant vary. P. pellucida has been used for treating abdominal pain, abscesses, acne, boils, colic, fatigue, gout, headache, renal disorders, and rheumatic joint pain. In Bolivia, Alteños Indians use the whole plant to stop hemorrhages. The roots are used to treat fevers and the aerial parts are used as dressing for wounds. In northeastern Brazil, the plant has been used to lower cholesterol. In Guyana and the Amazon region, it is a popular cough suppressant, emollient, and diuretic. It is also used to treat proteinuria. It is also used topically for skin disorders such as acne and boils. In the western parts of Nigeria, it is used as water extract in the treatment of high blood pressure and urinary tract infections and insomnia. In the Philippines, it is one of the 10 medicinal plants endorsed by the Department of Health. It is used to decrease uric acid levels, which is a cause of arthritis and gout. It can be used as a decoction or eaten raw as a salad.

== Common names ==
It is known as pepper elder, silverbush, rat-ear, man-to-man, clearweed (North America); prenetaria (Puerto Rico); konsaka wiwiri (Suriname); coraçãozinho or "little heart", língua-de-sapo, erva-de-vidro or erva-de-jabuti (Brazil); ewe rinrin (Yoruba Nigeria), corazón de hombre (Cuba). In Oceania, it is called rtertiil (Belauan); podpod-lahe or potpopot (Chamorro). In the different dialects of the Philippines, it is called pansit-pansitan or ulasimang-bato (Tagalog), olasiman ihalas (Bisaya), sinaw-sinaw or tangon-tangon (Bikol), lin-linnaaw (Ilocano) and "clavo-clavo" (Chavacano). In other parts of Asia, it is known as càng cua (Vietnam);nathamee koon နတ်သမီးကွမ်း (Burmese); sagar bataing သဂါဗတာင် (Mon); pak krasang ผักกระสัง (Thailand); "krasang teap" ក្រសាំងទាប (Cambodia); suna kosho (Japan); rangu-rangu, ketumpangan or tumpang angin (Bahasa/Malay); sasaladahan (Sundanese); rinrin (Nigeria), "shining bush" (Trinidad and Tobago); mashithandu മഷിത്തണ്ട്, വെള്ളത്തണ്ട് and വെള്ളപ്പച്ചില (Malayalam); diya thippili, Ponounuwa (পনৌনোৱা) (Assamese), දිය තිප්පිලි (Sinhalese). In west Bengal, India the plant is locally known as "Luchi pata". In Guyana the plant is also known as "Soldier Parsley." In Commonwealth of Dominica it is known as “zèb kouwès.” In Jamaica it is known as "Black Joint" or "Black Jointer"
