= KOE =

KOE (Krewe of Elvis) is a Mardi Gras organization in New Orleans.

KOE or Koe may also refer to:

- Koe, a surname and given name, including a list of people with the name
- Communist Organization of Greece (Κομμουνιστική Οργάνωση Ελλάδας, Kommounistikí Orgánosi Elládas, KOE), a Greek political party
- Konami of Europe, the European subsidiary of Konami currently known as Konami Digital Entertainment B.V.
- El Tari International Airport, Indonesia, IATA airport code KOE
- Baale language, ISO 939-3 language code koe
- Hellenic Swimming Federation (Greek: Κολυμβητική Ομοσπονδία Ελλάδος)

== See also ==
- Coe (disambiguation)
- Khoe (disambiguation)
- Koe o Kikasete (disambiguation)
- King of Europe Cup (KOE Cup), a European professional wrestling tournament
- Koe de Oshigoto!, or KoeGoto, a 2008–2013 manga series
- Koe Girl! or Koe Gāru!, a Japanese TV series
- Koe no Katachi, a Japanese manga series
- Acho Dene Koe First Nation, a Dene band government based in Fort Liard, Northwest Territories, Canada
- "Sora/Koe" ('Air/Voice'), a song by Every Little Thing
- Koei, a Japanese video game publisher
- Kōei, a Japanese era name
- Koës, a village in the ǁKaras Region of south-eastern Namibia
