= Kho =

Kho may refer to:

- Kho, the Hokkien romanization of the Chinese surname Xu (許)
- Kho (cooking technique), a cooking technique in Vietnamese cuisine
- Kho (costume) (or Bakhu), a traditional outfit worn by Bhutia, ethnic Tibetans of Sikkim
- Kho people, a people of Pakistan
- Kho language, or Khowar, a language of Pakistan
- Kho-Bwa languages, a Sino-Tibetan language family of northeast India
- Kho-Kho (disambiguation)
  - Kho kho, a traditional Indian sport
- Khao Kho, a mountain in Phetchabun Province, Thailand

== See also ==
- Khoe (disambiguation)
- Khoisan (disambiguation)
