= Bò kho =

Vietnamese beef stew

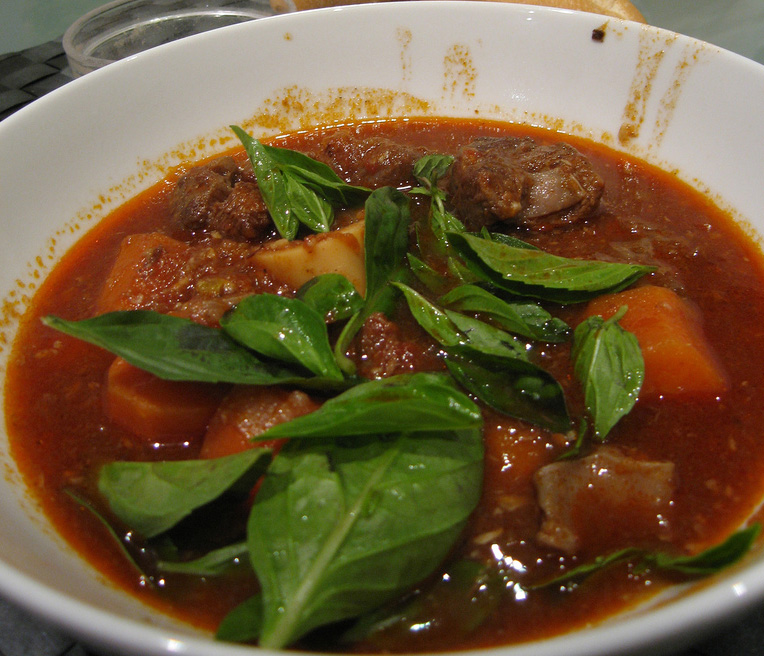
- Course: Main course
- Place of origin: Vietnam
- Region or state: Southeast Asia
- Associated cuisine: Vietnamese and Cambodian
- Serving temperature: Hot
- Main ingredients: Beef, carrots, tomatoes, and aromatics
- Food energy (per serving): 418 kcal (1,750 kJ)
Nutritional value
(per serving)
- Protein: 30.5 g
- Fat: 25.2 g
- Carbohydrate: 14.3 g

Bò kho (Vietnamese pronunciation: [ɓɔː˨˩ xɔː˧˧]) is a Vietnamese stew made by simmering chunks of beef and carrots in a tomato base that has been infused with the aromatic essence of lemongrass, ginger, star anise, cinnamon, and five-spice. It is usually served with noodles or a lightly-toasted baguette, and herbs, which include Thai basil, Vietnamese coriander, rice paddy herb, mint, culantro, and chopped cilantro and scallions.

== Origin and influences ==
Bò kho originated in Southern Vietnam during French colonization. It is believed to be an interpretation of French pot-au-feu, boeuf bourguignon, boeuf aux carottes, or daube de boeuf. Proof that bò kho was not created independent of French influence can be found in the main ingredients that make up the dish. Firstly, there is beef, which was rarely eaten in Vietnam prior to the arrival of the French, as cows were valued as working animals. Carrots and tomatoes were other new ingredients introduced to Vietnam via the French. The baguette that is usually eaten with bò kho was another French contribution.

Chinese cuisine also impacted the creation of bò kho. For instance, the five-spice and star anise found in bò kho recipes are ingredients that are Chinese in origin. Additionally, eating bò kho with noodles can be attributed to Chinese culinary influence.

Indian cuisine indirectly had a hand in creating bò kho as well. The incorporation of Indian flavors into bò kho can be traced back to Vietnam's 1471 conquest and annexation of the Champa Kingdom, a Hindu, Indianized culture that had occupied what is now Southern and Central Vietnam. Many of the more heavily spiced dishes that are found in Vietnam today, which include bò kho, are believed to be, in part, the legacy of these conquered peoples' Indianized culinary traditions.

== An atypical kho dish ==
Kho means "to braise, simmer, or stew". Bò kho was likely grouped together with the other kho dishes (thịt kho tàu, cá kho tộ, and gà kho gừng) because they all require braising, simmering, or stewing. The similarities end there, however.

The following are three notable differences between bò kho and all other kho dishes:

- Time of origination – Bò kho was created during French colonization, whereas all other kho dishes have been a part of Vietnamese cuisine well before the French arrived. A tell-tale sign of precolonial origins for all the other kho dishes can be found in their recipes, none of which include ingredients brought over by the French.
- Preparation and taste – Though there may be some exceptions, most bò kho recipes do not call for the use of nước màu (caramel sauce), a requisite ingredient for making the base of all other kho dishes. Because of this, bò kho lacks the subtle bittersweetness of typical kho dishes. The flavor profile of bò kho is further removed from that of other kho dishes by replacing this nước màu-centric base with one of tomato, which, along with lemongrass, gives it a slight acidity/tanginess that is unique among the kho dishes.
- Accompaniments – All other kho dishes are served with steamed rice, but bò kho is more commonly eaten with various types of noodles or a simple baguette. Additionally, bò kho comes with a plate of fresh herbs, which is not standard for other kho dishes.

== Variations ==
The following are the names of bò kho dishes based on what they are served with:

- Bò kho không – with nothing
- Bánh mì bò kho – with a baguette
- Phở bò kho – with white rice noodles
- Hủ tiếu bò kho – with vermicelli noodles
- Mì bò kho – with yellow egg noodles
- Mì gói bò kho – with instant noodles
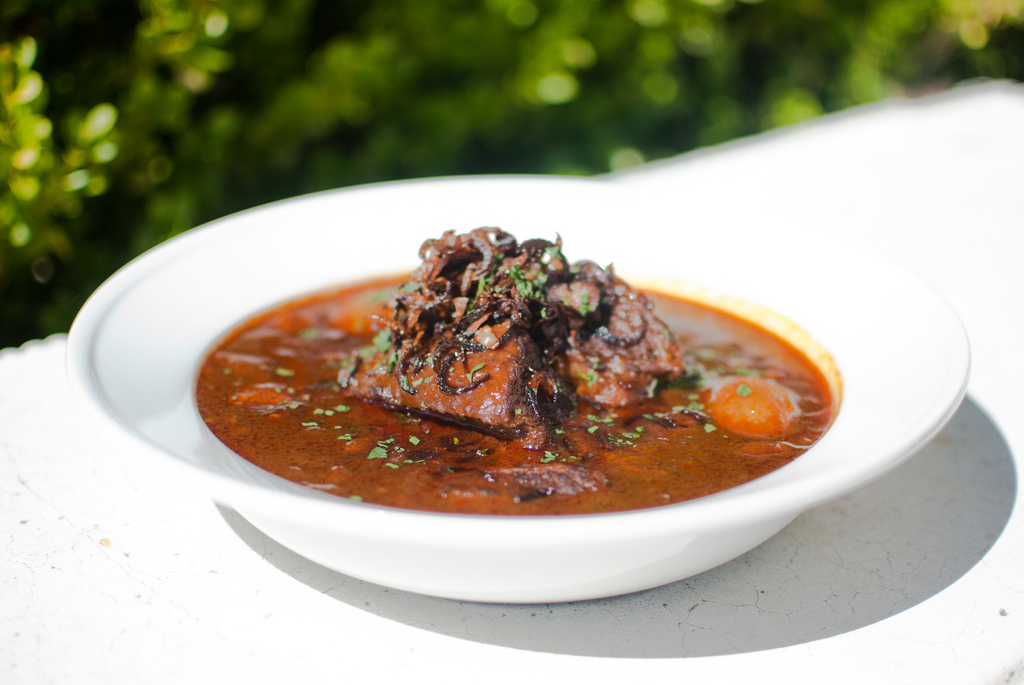
Bò kho không

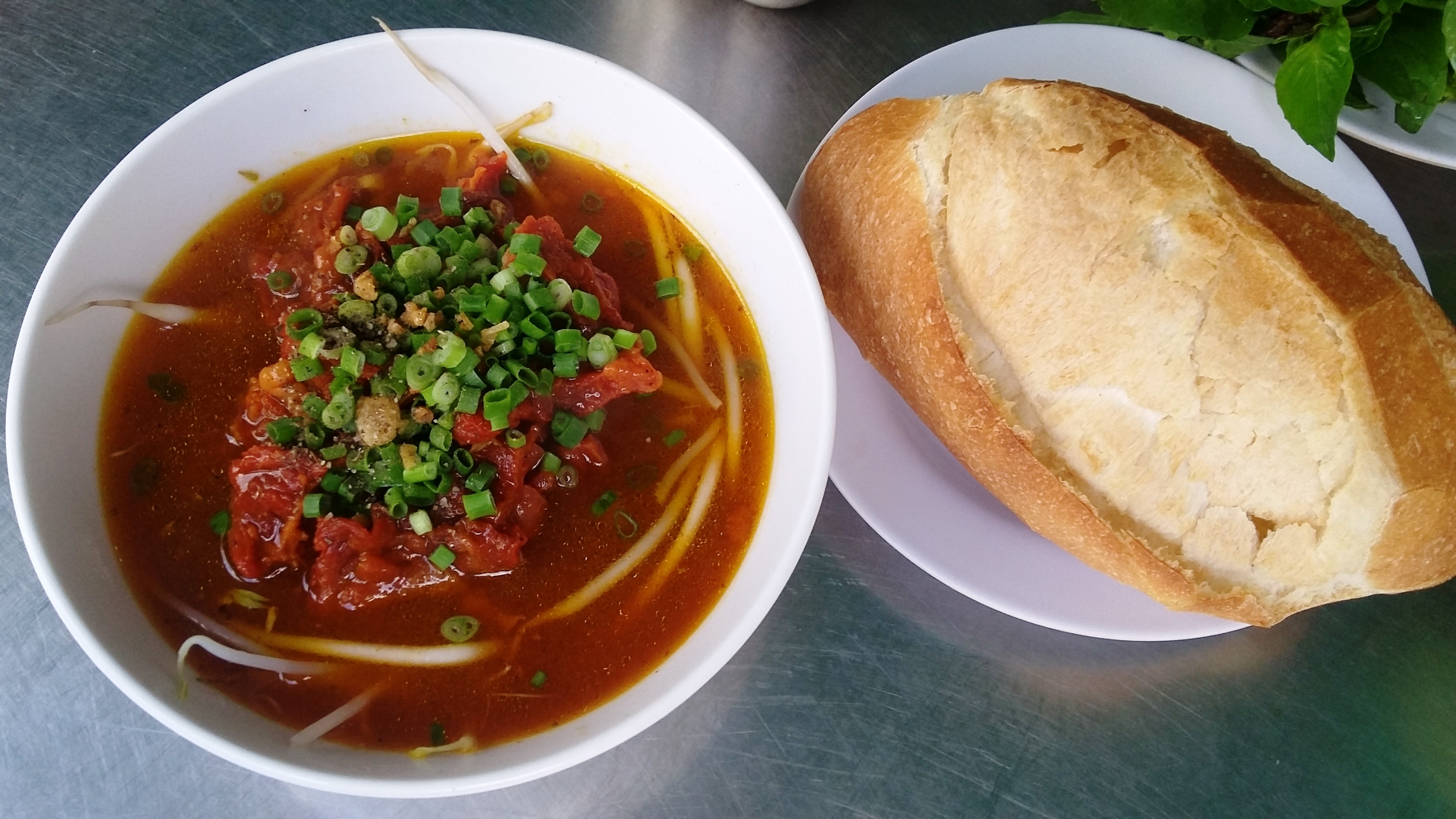
Bánh mì bò kho

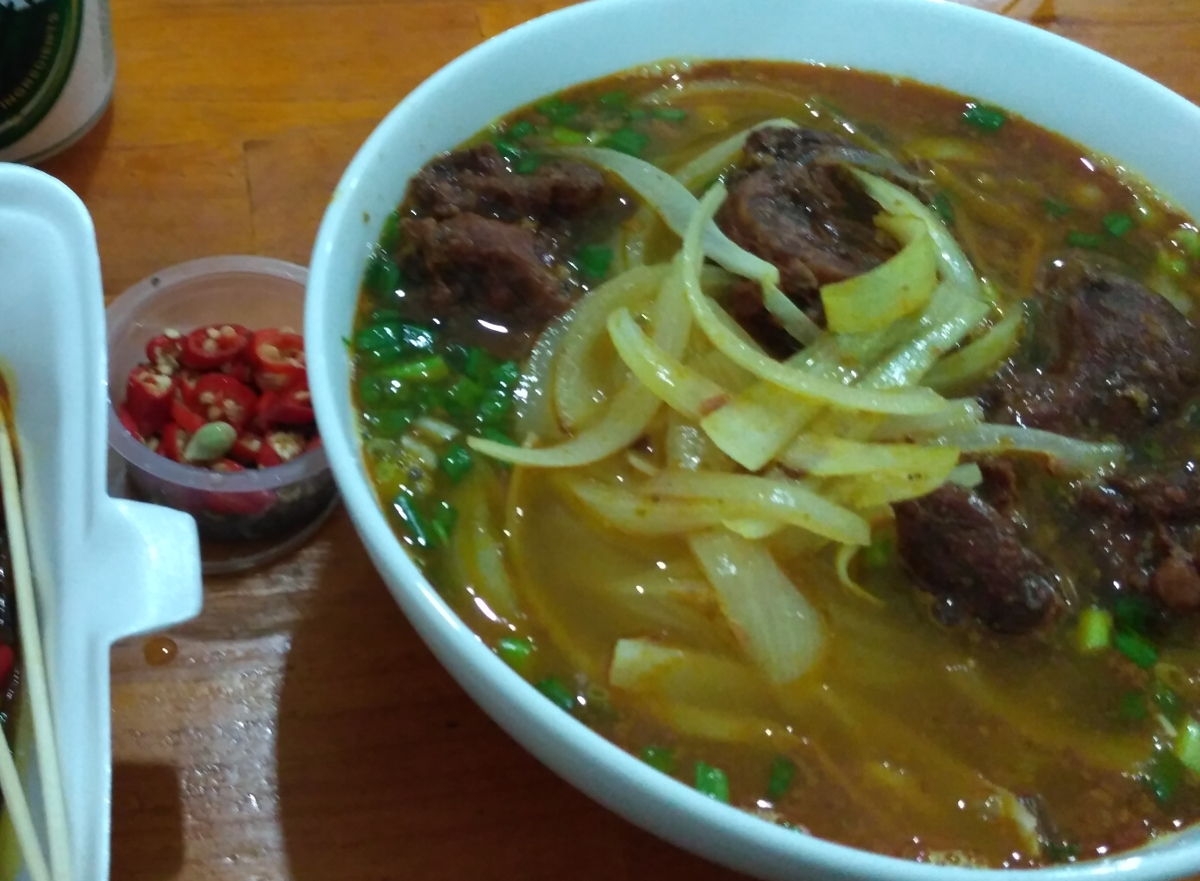
Hủ tiếu bò kho

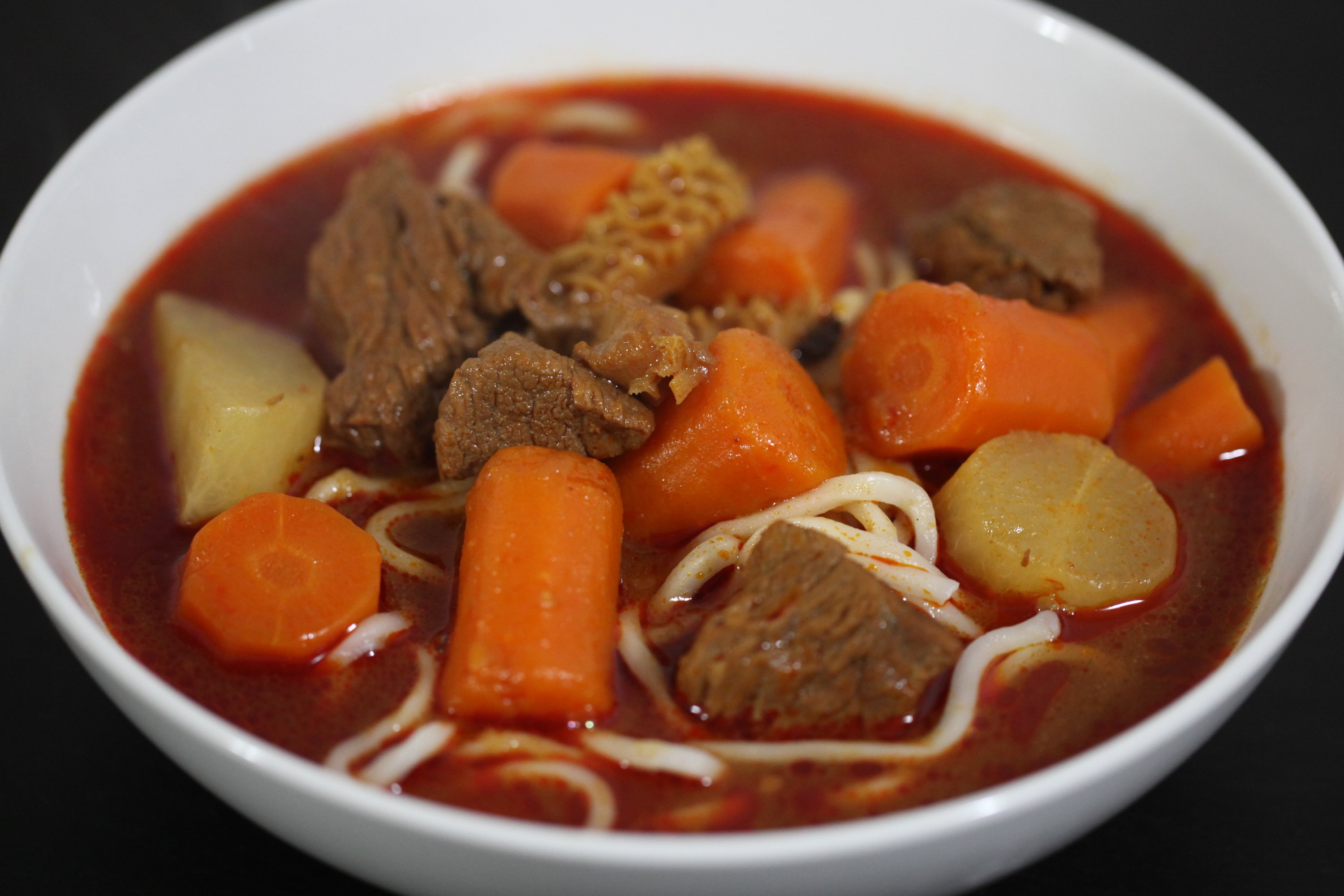
Mì bò kho

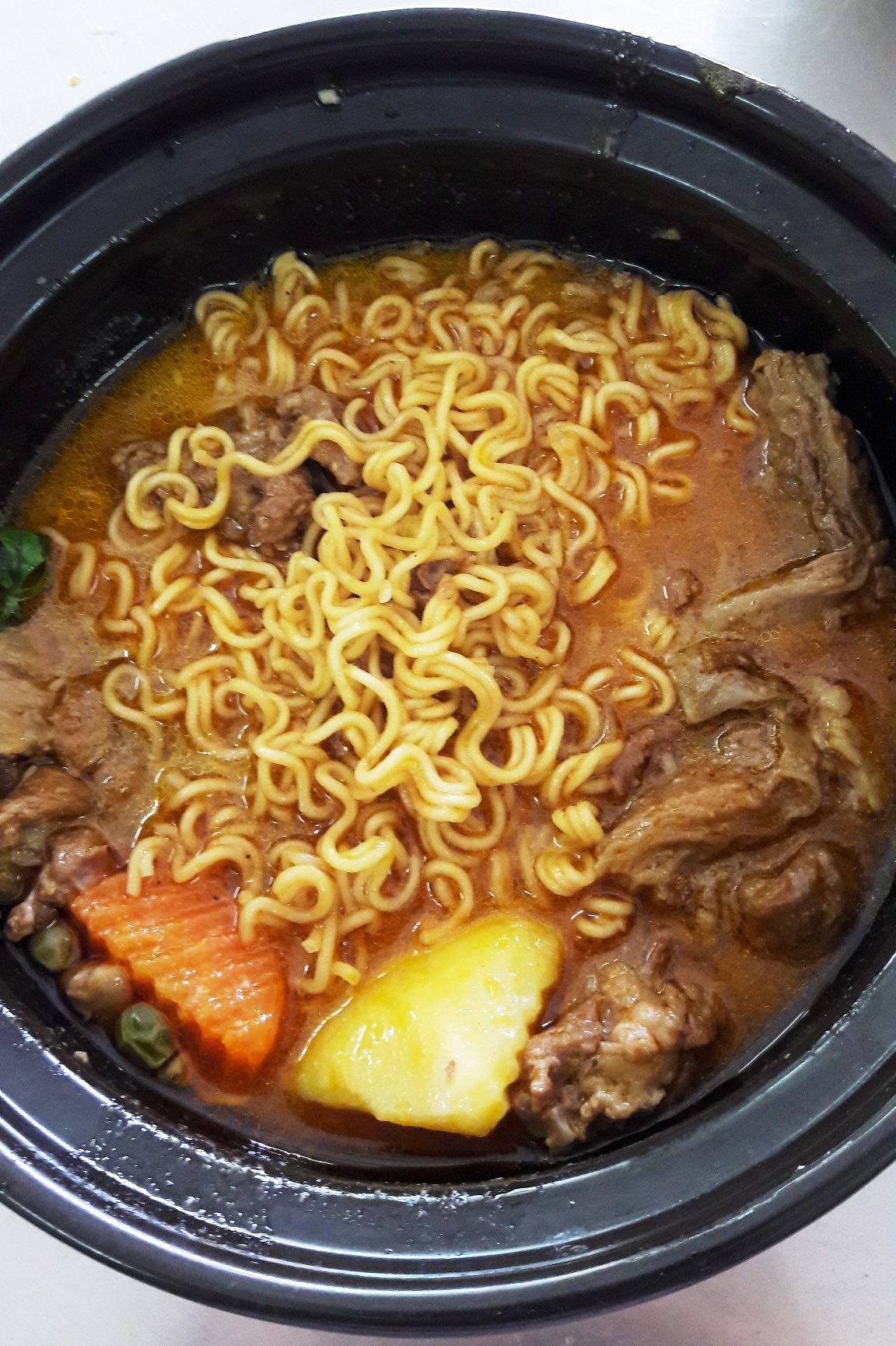
Mì gói bò kho

== Popularity ==
Bò kho has been incorporated into the cuisine of neighboring Cambodia, where it is known as khor ko (Khmer: ខគោ).

== See also ==
- Kho (cooking technique)
