= Pig-chopping Festival =

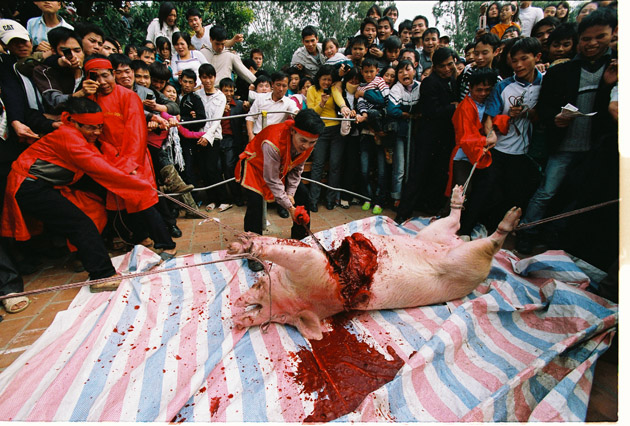
Pig Slaughter Festival in 2009.

Pig-chopping Festival or Pig Slaughter Festival or The Nem Thuong Village Traditional Festival (Lễ hội chém lợn in Vietnamese) is a festival held on the 6th day January of the Lunar New Year, during Tết Festival in Nem Thuong Village, Khắc Niệm ward, Bắc Ninh City, Bac Ninh Province, northern Vietnam.

== Description ==
It is considered the most important festival of the year in Nem Thuong village, but it has been criticized both domestically and internationally.

Due to the criticisims from the animal protection organizations and the public for its brutality, the Department of Culture, Sports and Tourism of Bac Ninh Province to the Ministry of Culture, Sports and Tourism asked the local government to hold the Nem Thuong Festival in a private area, not in a public area of the village communal house as usual. The people are not allowed to embed money in pig's blood.
