= Koe =

Koe is a given name and a surname. Notable people with the name include:

== Surname ==
- Amanda Lee Koe (born 1988), Singaporean-born American writer
- Benjamin Koe (1816 – 1842), English cricket player
- Fred Koe (born 1947), Canadian politician
- Jamie Koe (born 1977), Canadian curler
- Kenneth Koe (1925 – 2015), American chemist
- Kevin Koe (born 1975), Canadian curler
- Kerry Koe (born 1977), Canadian curler
- Koe Yeet (born 1992), Malaysian actress

== Given name ==
- Koe Wetzel (born 1992), American country music singer and songwriter
