= Kho-Kho (disambiguation) =

Kho-Kho is a traditional Indian tag sport.

Kho-Kho can also refer to:

- Kho-Kho (2013 film), an Indian Marathi-language film
- Kho-Kho (2021 film), an Indian Malayalam-language sports drama film by Rahul Riji Nair

== See also ==
- Kho (disambiguation)
