= Koe o Kikasete =

Koe o Kikasete may refer to:

- "Koe o Kikasete", ending theme to the second season of the anime Ojamajo Doremi, 2000
- "Koe o Kikasete" (Beni song), 2011
- "Koe o Kikasete" (Big Bang song), 2009
- "Koe o Kikasete" (Shizuka Kudo song), 1992
