= Tết =

Vietnamese New Year celebration

Vietnamese New Year Tết Nguyên Đán 節元旦
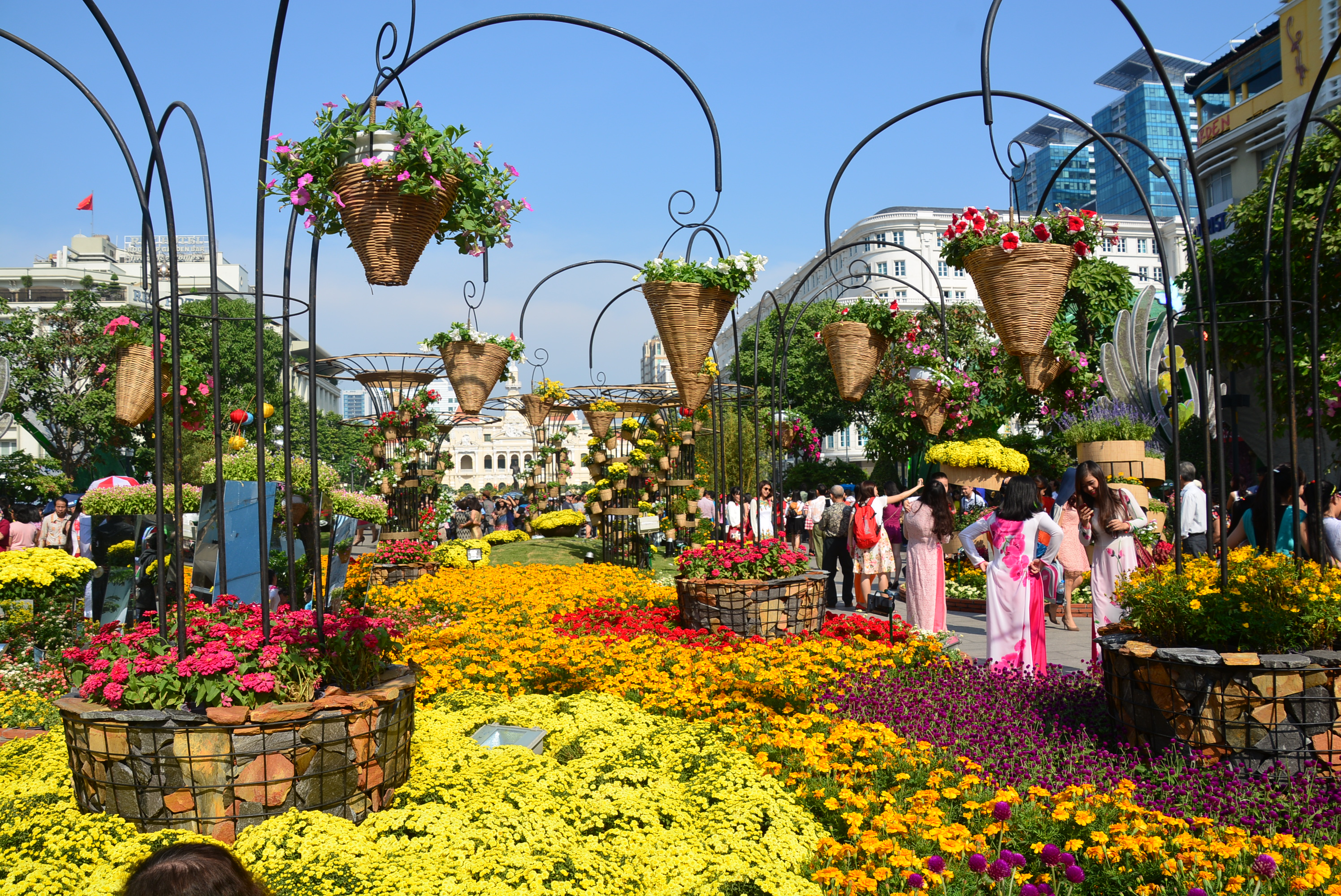
- Tết decorations in the streets of Ho Chi Minh City
- Official name: Tết Nguyên Đán
- Also called: Tết; Lunar New Year (as a collective term including other Asian Lunar New Year festivals, used outside of Asia)
- Observed by: Vietnamese
- Type: Religious, cultural, and national
- Significance: First day of the new year
- Celebrations: fireworks, family gatherings, family meals, visiting friends' homes on the first day of the new year (xông đất), visiting friends and relatives, ancestor veneration, making a creative work for luck (Note: Usually in the form of writing and calligraphy, however this may include artistic works.) (khai bút), giving red envelopes to children and elderly, and opening a shop
- Date: First day of the first Vietnamese lunisolar month
- 2025 date: 29 January
- 2026 date: 17 February
- 2027 date: 6 February
- Frequency: Annual
- Related to: Lunar New Year; Chinese New Year; Japanese New Year; Korean New Year; Tsagaan Sar; Losar

Tết (Vietnamese: [tet̚˧˦], chữ Hán: 節), short for Tết Nguyên Đán (chữ Hán: 節元旦; lit. 'Feast of the first day'), is the most important celebration in Vietnamese culture. Tết celebrates the arrival of spring, which is on the first day of the first Vietnamese lunisolar month, and usually falls between late January and 20 February in the Gregorian calendar.

Tết Nguyên Đán is not to be confused with Tết Trung Thu (Mid–Autumn Festival). "Tết" itself only means "festival", but it would generally refer to the Lunar New Year in Vietnamese, as it is often seen as the most important festival amongst the Vietnamese and the Vietnamese diaspora, with Tết Trung Thu regarded as the second-most important.

Vietnamese people celebrate Tết annually, which is based on a lunisolar calendar that calculates both the motions of Earth around the Sun and of the Moon around Earth. Tết is generally celebrated on the same day as Chinese New Year (also called Spring Festival), with a one-hour time difference between Vietnam and China resulting in the new moon occurring on different days. The dates of the Vietnamese and Chinese Lunar New Year occasionally differ, such as in 1985, when Vietnam celebrated Lunar New Year a month before China. It takes place from the first day of the first month of the Vietnamese lunar calendar (around late January or early February) until at least the third day.

Tết is also an occasion for pilgrimages and family reunions. Celebrants set aside the trouble of the past year and hope for a better and happier upcoming new year. This festival can also be referred to as Hội xuân in vernacular Vietnamese, (from lễ hội, "festival", and mùa xuân, "spring").

The reason why the celebration is celebrated is told in a legend which is recorded by Dat Le Que Thoi. Long ago, a couple was so destitute that they were forced to separate. Later, the wife remarried a wealthy man. One day, while she was burning ritual paper offerings in the courtyard, her former husband—who had come to beg for food—happened to appear; recognizing him and moved by compassion, she brought out rice and money for him. When her current husband discovered what had happened, the wife threw herself into the blazing pile of offerings and perished in the flames. Touched by this, the former husband leapt into the fire and died alongside her. Overcome with grief, the second husband also jumped in. All three burned to death. The Jade Emperor, recognizing their devotion and righteousness, appointed them as the Kitchen Gods.

== History ==
The Lunar New Year holiday was originally brought to Vietnam by the Chinese, who had formally conquered Vietnam into their Han Dynasty empire in 111 BC and mostly ruled it for over 1000 years until the collapse of the Tang Dynasty in the 10th century. That historic period of Chinese rule significantly influenced Vietnamese culture, language, and administration, as Chinese governors had attempted complete Sinicization. Today, Vietnamese Lunar New Year still follows the lunar calendar and retains original Chinese customs, such as gifts of lucky money in red envelopes. However, Vietnam also evolved its own distinct traditions, including customary Tết dishes, that reflect Vietnamese culture. The Vietnamese zodiac has the Buffalo, Cat, and Goat instead of the Ox, Rabbit, and Sheep in the Chinese zodiac.

=== Controversies ===
Tết's origins have been a subject of scholarly research for many generations. Most information sources state that Tết originated from the period of Chinese domination. However according to the official online newspaper of the Vietnamese government, some historical materials suggest otherwise.

According to researcher Toan Anh, Tết Nguyên Đán is considered the first festival of the new year, beginning at midnight with the Trừ tịch ceremony. The ceremony usually takes place between the hour of the Pig on the 30th day or, if it is a short month, on the 29th day of the 12th lunar month, and the hour of the Rat on the 1st day of the first lunar month.

Researcher Phan Cẩm Thượng, in his book Customs of Human Life, explains that the Vietnamese use the agricultural calendar or lunar calendar, which is based on the moon's rotation around the earth but also accounts for the 24 solar terms of the earth with the sun, including the four key points of the spring equinox, autumnal equinox, winter solstice, and summer solstice. Tết begins on the first day of lunar January, marking the start of a new year and a new farming cycle.

Historian Trần Văn Giáp asserts that there are many ways to divide time into months and years. From the beginning, each ethnic group had its own way of dividing months and years. According to Trần's research, Tết Nguyên Đán in Vietnam dates back to the first century AD.(While during this period, northern Vietnam was under Han administration, and the imperial Chinese calendar system was in use.）The origin and meaning of Tết Nguyên Đán have been prevalent since then.

According to the legend of Bánh chưng Bánh giầy, the Vietnamese have celebrated Tết since before the time of the Hùng kings. The legend of Lang Lieu and Bánh chưng also suggests that Tết existed over a thousand years before the period of Chinese domination. (To date, no substantial archaeological evidence has been established to support this claim.)

== Name ==
The name Tết is a shortening of Tết Nguyên Đán, literally written as tết (meaning 'festivals'; only used in festival names) and nguyên đán which means the first day of the year. Both terms come from Sino-Vietnamese, respectively, 節 (tiết) and 元旦.

The word for festival is usually lễ hội, another Sino-Vietnamese term 禮會.

== Customs ==
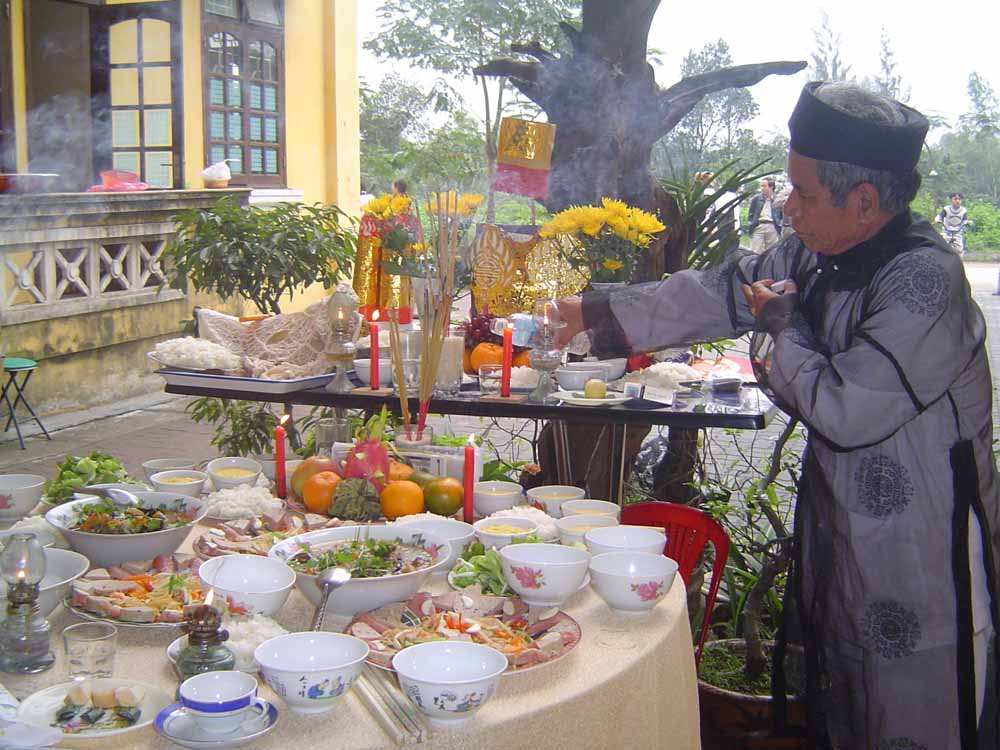
Tất Niên offering

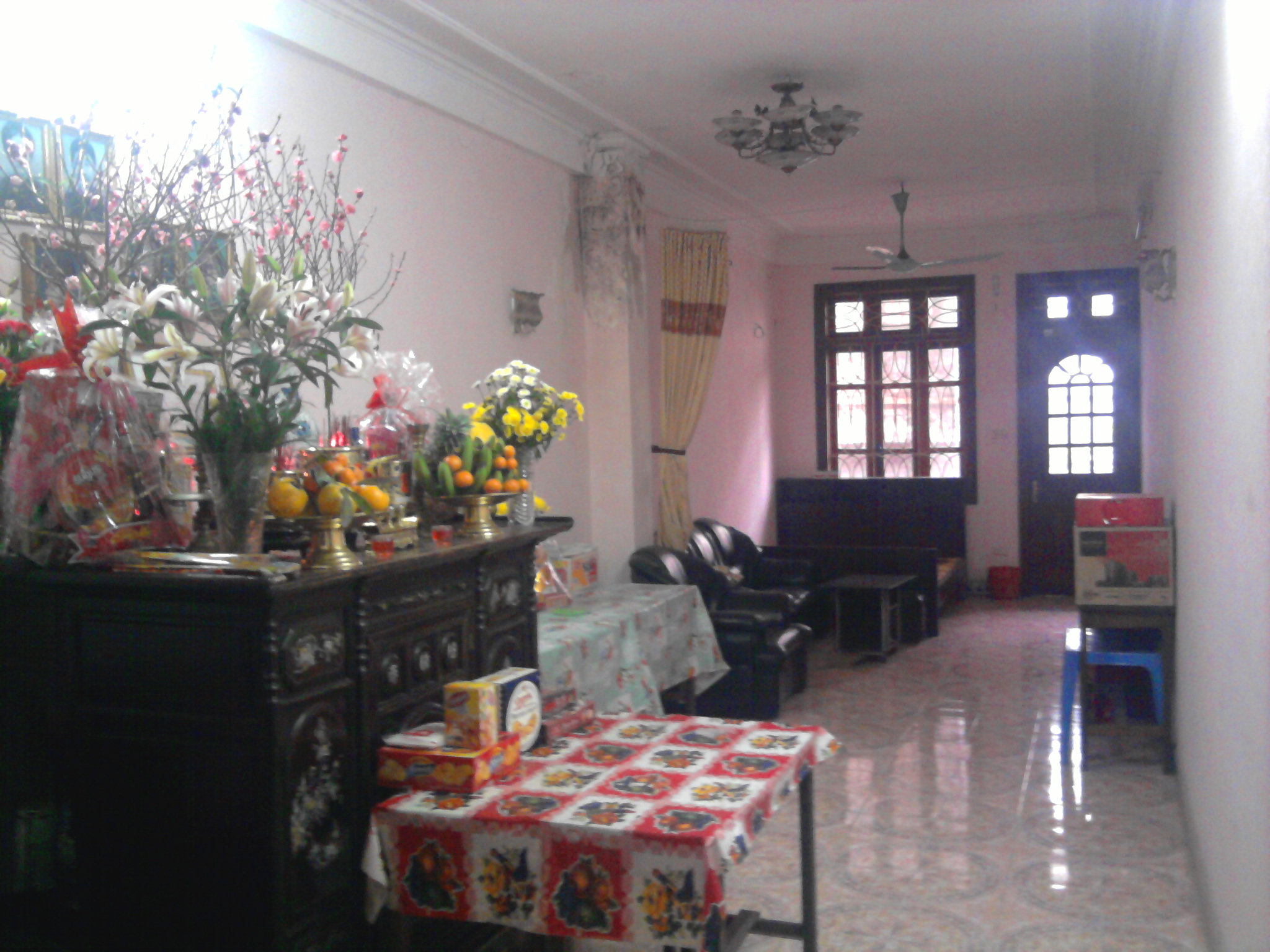
A family altar in Vietnam

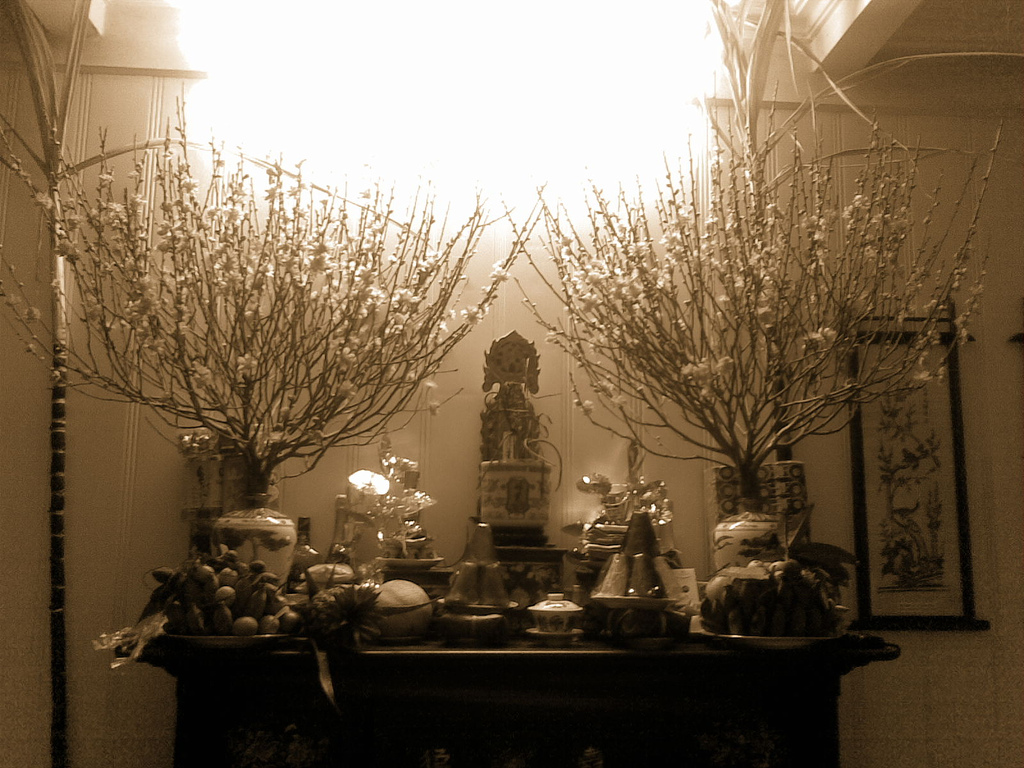
Altar to the ancestors

In Vietnamese Tết culture, there are many traditional customs and preparations leading up to the Lunar New Year celebration. The holiday is typically divided into two parts: the two weeks before the first day of the new year, which are dedicated to preparations, and the first three days of the new year, which focus on customs for welcoming and celebrating the new year. During Tết, people usually return home to be with their families. From the 23rd day of the last lunar month to New Year’s Eve, many families begin the tradition of visiting their ancestral homeland to worship at the family altar or pay respects at their ancestors’ graves. They also clean and tend to the gravesites as a gesture of respect and remembrance. Although Tết is a national holiday celebrated across Vietnam, each region and religion observes it with its own unique customs and traditions.

Many Vietnamese prepare for Tết by cooking special holiday food and doing house cleaning. These foods include bánh tét, bánh chưng, bánh dày, canh khổ qua, thịt kho hột vịt, dried young bamboo soup (canh măng), giò, and xôi (sticky rice). Many customs and traditions are practiced during Tết, such as visiting a person's house on the first day of the new year (xông nhà), ancestor veneration, exchanging New Year's greetings, giving lucky money to children and elderly people, opening a shop, visiting relatives, friends, and neighbors.

Tết can be divided into three time periods, tất niên (celebrations before the end of the year), giao thừa (New Year's Eve), and năm mới (the New Year), representing the preparation before Tết, the eve of Tết, and the days of and following Tết, respectively.

=== New Year in Tết ===
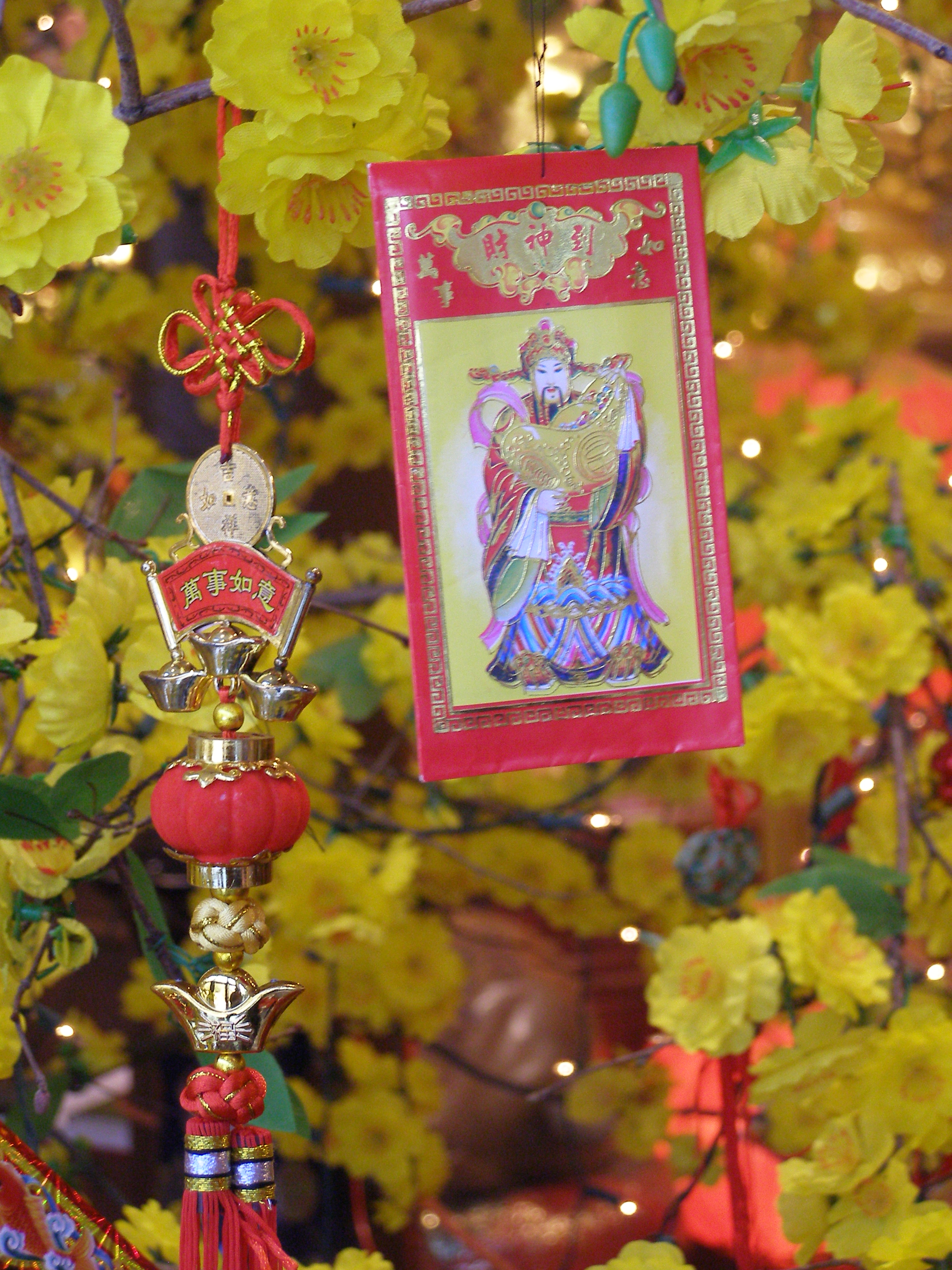
A red envelope decorations (lì xì)

The first day of Tết is reserved for the immediate family. Children receive red envelopes containing money from their elders. This tradition is called "mừng tuổi" (happy age) in the North region and "lì xì" in the South region. Usually, children wear their new clothes and give their elders the traditional Tết greetings before receiving money. Wearing red clothing during Tết is common as it is associated with good luck.

Since the Vietnamese believe that the first visitor who a family receives in the year determines their fortune for the entire year, people never enter any house on the first day without being invited first. The verb of being the first person to enter a house at Tết is xông đất, xông nhà, or đạp đất, which is one of the most important customs during Tết. According to Vietnamese tradition, if good things come to a family on the first day of the lunar New Year, the entire following year will also be full of blessings. Usually, a person of good temper, morality, and success will be a lucky sign for the host family and be first invited into his house. However, just to be safe, the owner of the house will leave the house a few minutes before midnight and come back just as the clock strikes midnight to prevent anyone else from entering the house first who might potentially bring any unfortunate events in the new year to the household. This is a common practice done by many families.

Sweeping during Tết is taboo, it is xui or rủi (unlucky), since it symbolizes sweeping the luck away; that is why they clean before the new year. It is also taboo for anyone who experienced a recent loss of a family member to visit anyone else during Tết.

It is important to retain harmony within the household during the first three days of Tết. Engaging in conflict, arguments, or exhibiting any feelings of anger and hatred may bring upon bad luck for the upcoming year.

During subsequent days, people visit relatives and friends. Traditionally but not strictly, the second day of Tết is usually reserved for friends, while the third day is for teachers, who command respect in Vietnam. Students in Vietnam are usually given a one-week long break from school to celebrate Tết. Local Buddhist temples are popular spots because people like to give donations and get their fortunes told during Tết. Children are free to spend their new money on toys or on gambling games such as bầu cua cá cọp, which can be found in the streets. Prosperous families can pay for dragon dancers to perform at their house. Also, public performances are given for everyone to watch.

=== Traditional celebrations ===
These celebrations can last from a day up to the entire week, and the New Year is filled with people in the streets trying to make as much noise as possible using firecrackers, drums, bells, gongs, and anything they can think of to ward off evil spirits. This parade will also include different masks and dancers hidden under the guise of what is known as the múa lân or lion dancing. The lân is an animal between a lion and a dragon and is the symbol of strength in the Vietnamese culture that is used to scare away evil spirits. After the parade, families, and friends come together to have a feast of traditional Vietnamese dishes and share the happiness and joy of the New Year with one another. This is also the time when the elders will hand out red envelopes with money to the children for good luck in exchange for Tết greetings.

It is also a tradition to pay off debts before the Vietnamese New Year for some Vietnamese families.

=== Decorations ===
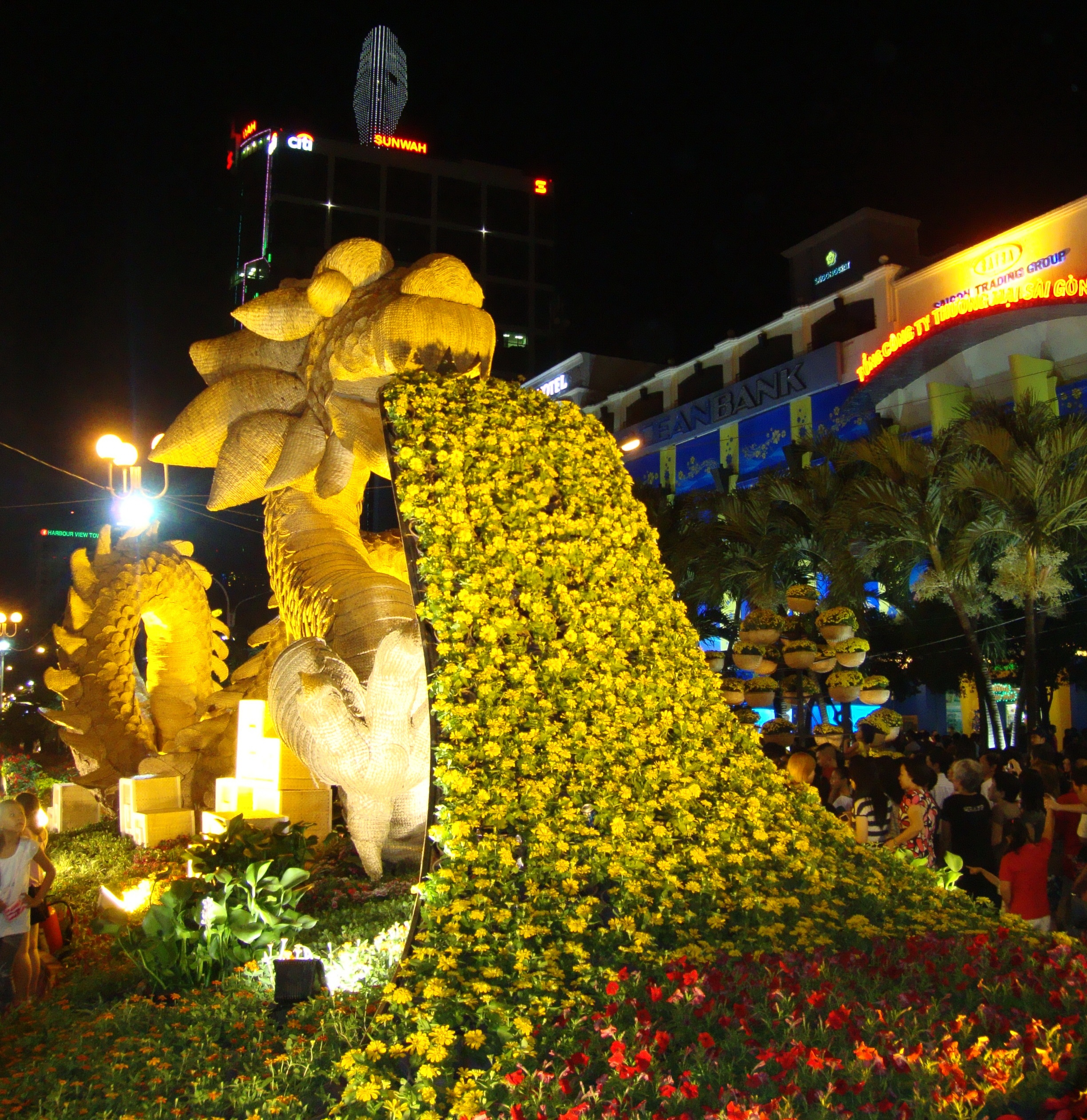
Street decoration honouring the Year of the Dragon (2012).

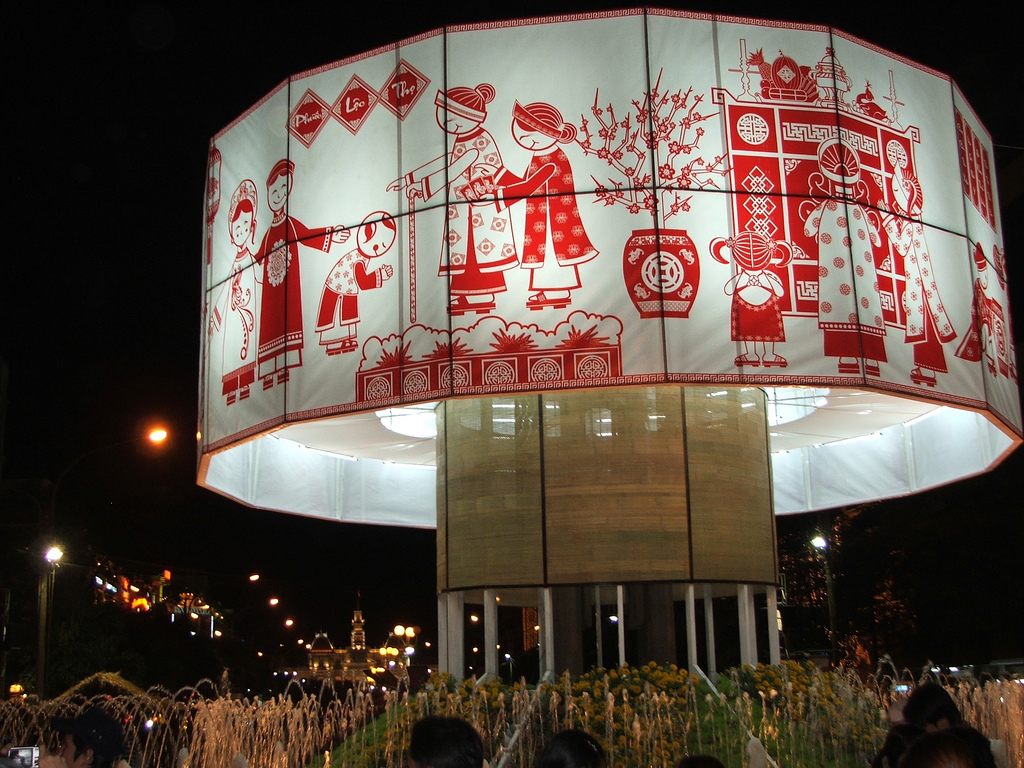
New Year decoration in Ho Chi Minh City.

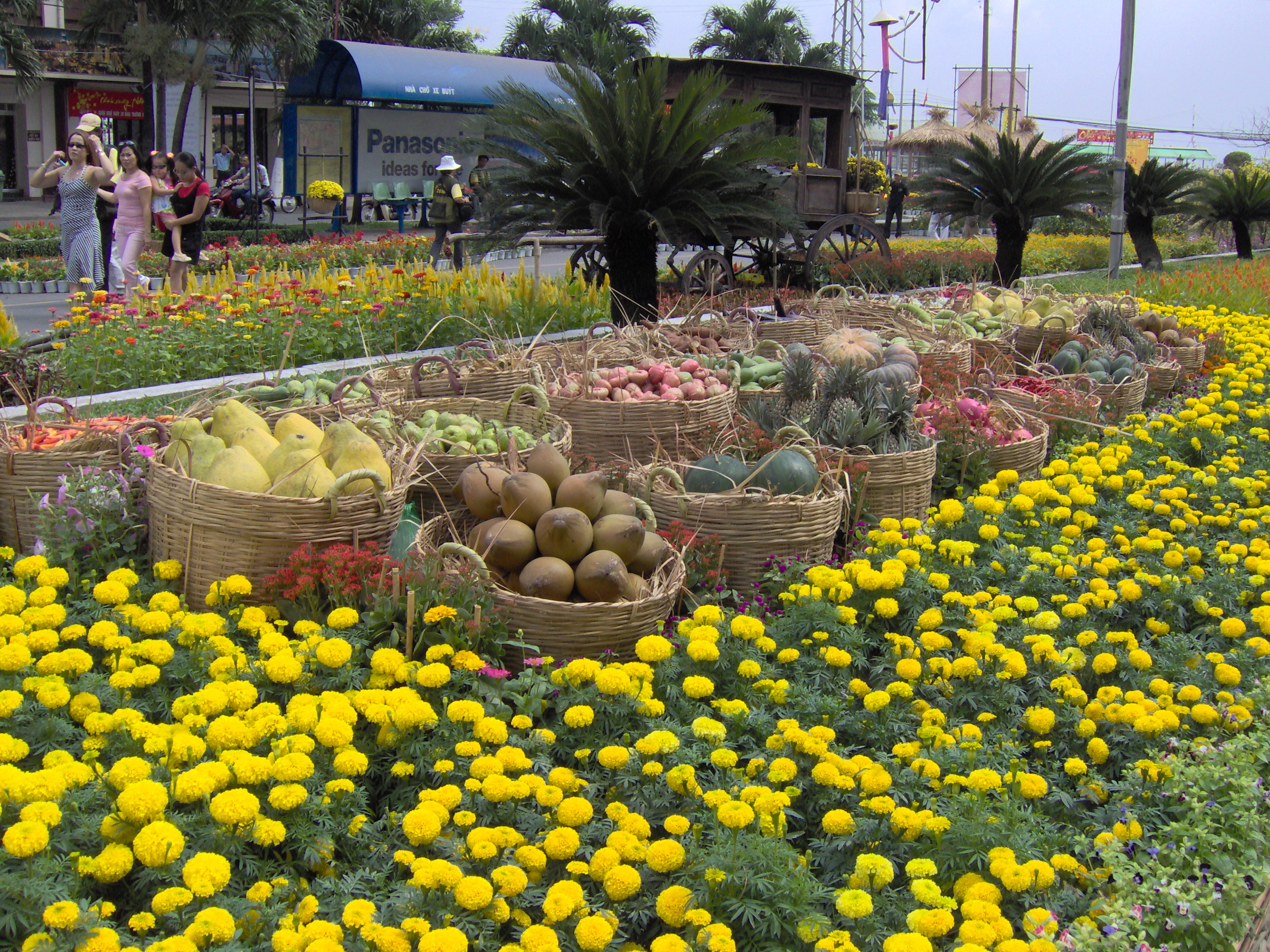
Tết display on the streets of Ho Chi Minh City.

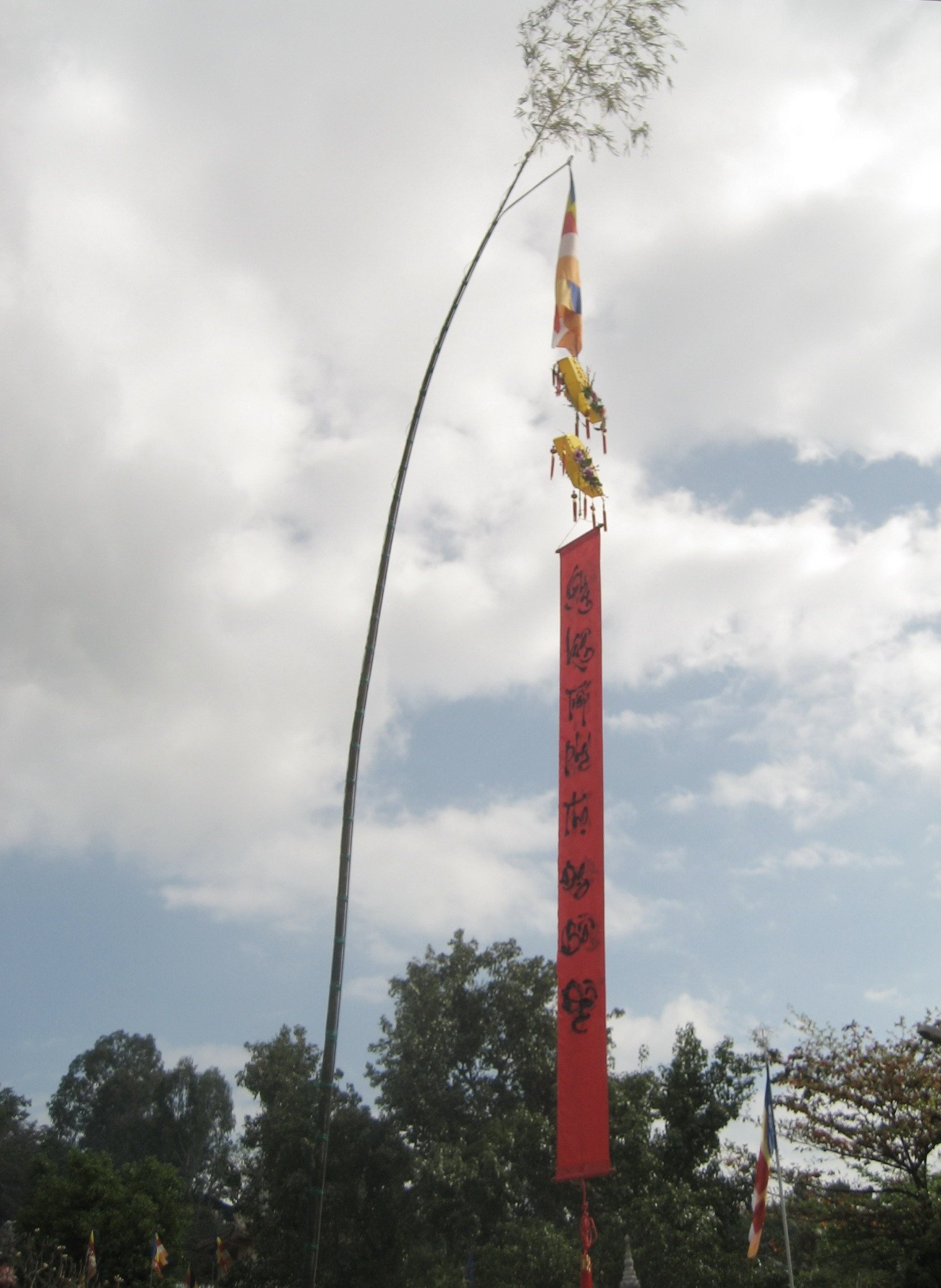
A cây nêu being hung at Long Sơn Temple, Nha Trang

Traditionally, each family displays cây nêu, an artificial New Year tree consisting of a bamboo pole 5–6 m (16–20 ft) long. The top end is usually decorated with many objects, depending on the locality, including good luck charms, origami fish, cactus branches, and more.

At Tết, every house is usually decorated by yellow Ochna blossoms (hoa mai) in Central and Southern Vietnam, peach blossoms (hoa đào) in Northern Vietnam, or mountain ebony (hoa ban) in the Northwestern mountain areas. In the north, some people (especially the elite in the past) also decorate their house with plum blossoms. In the north or central, the kumquat tree is a popular decoration for the living room during Tết. Its many fruits symbolize fertility and fruitfulness which the family hopes in the coming year.

Vietnamese people also decorate their homes with Hòn non bộ and flowers such as chrysanthemums (hoa cúc), marigolds (vạn thọ) symbolizing longevity, cockscombs (mào gà) in southern Vietnam, and paperwhites (thủy tiên) and orchids (hoa lan) in northern Vietnam. In the past, there was a tradition where people tried to make their paperwhites bloom on the day of the observance.

They also hung up Đông Hồ paintings and thư pháp calligraphy pictures.

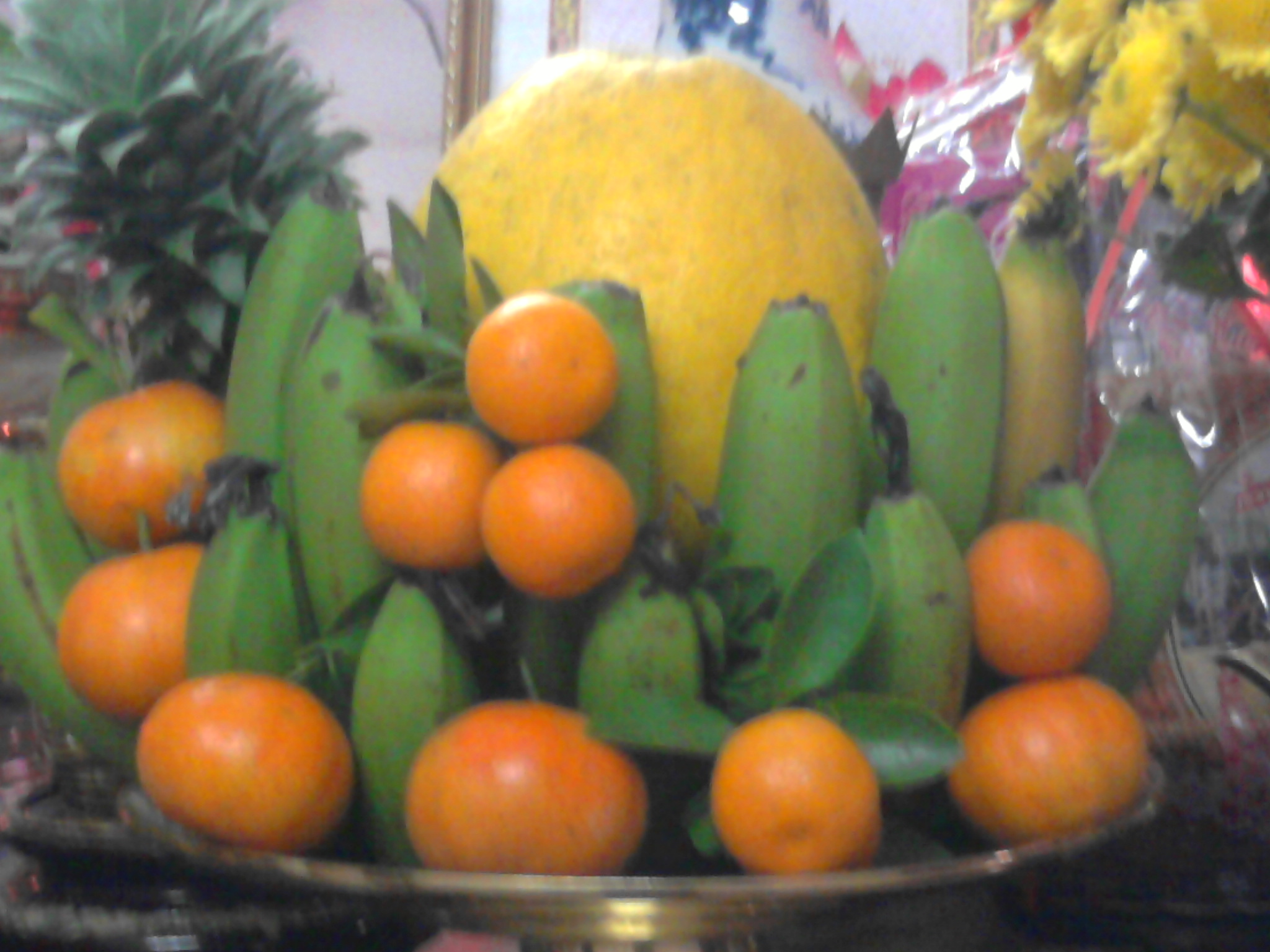
Mâm ngũ quả (five fruits tray) are made for Tết, here is a ngũ quả consisting of bananas, oranges, tangerines, a pomelo, and a pineapple

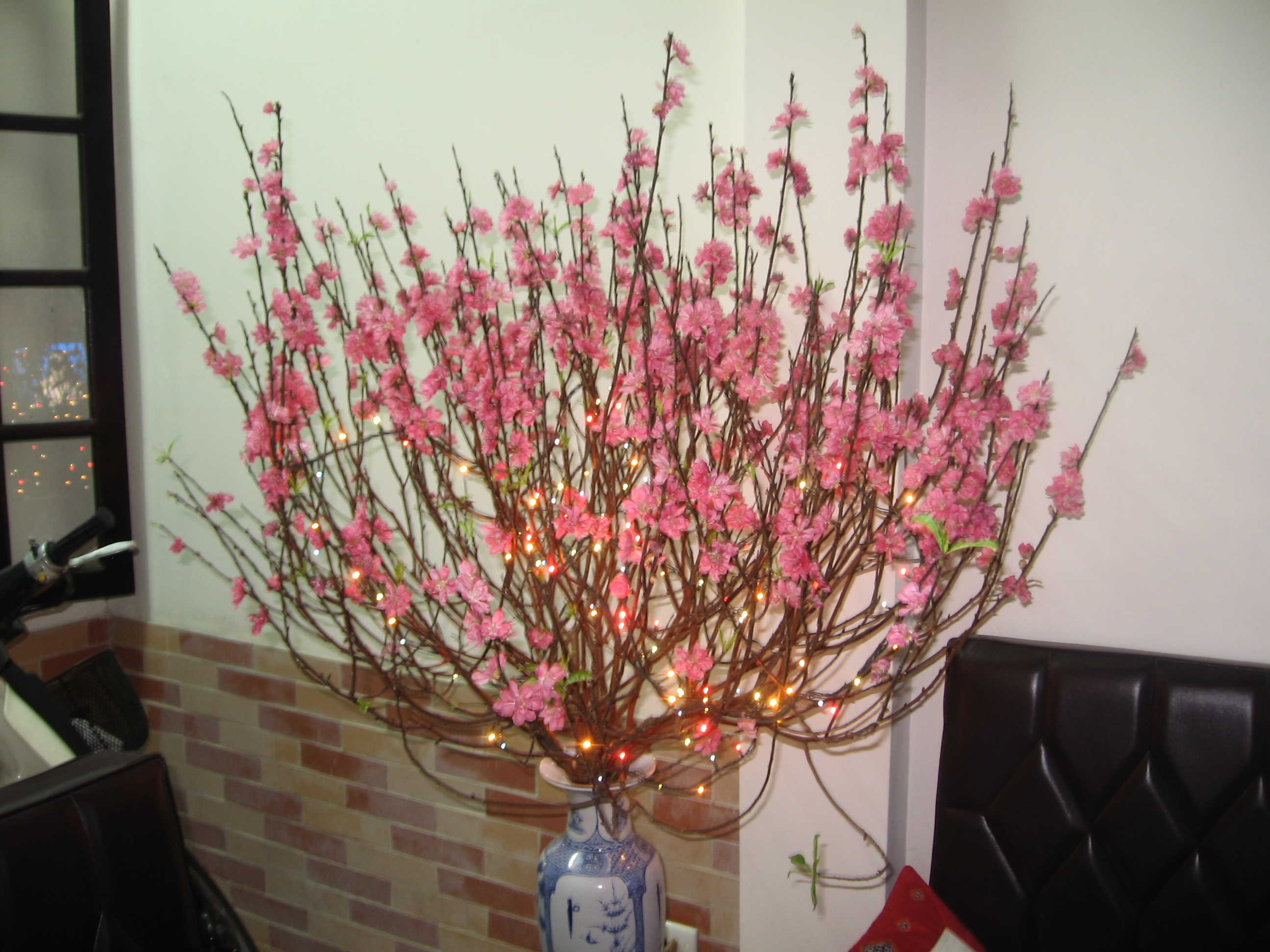
Peach blossoms (hoa đào)

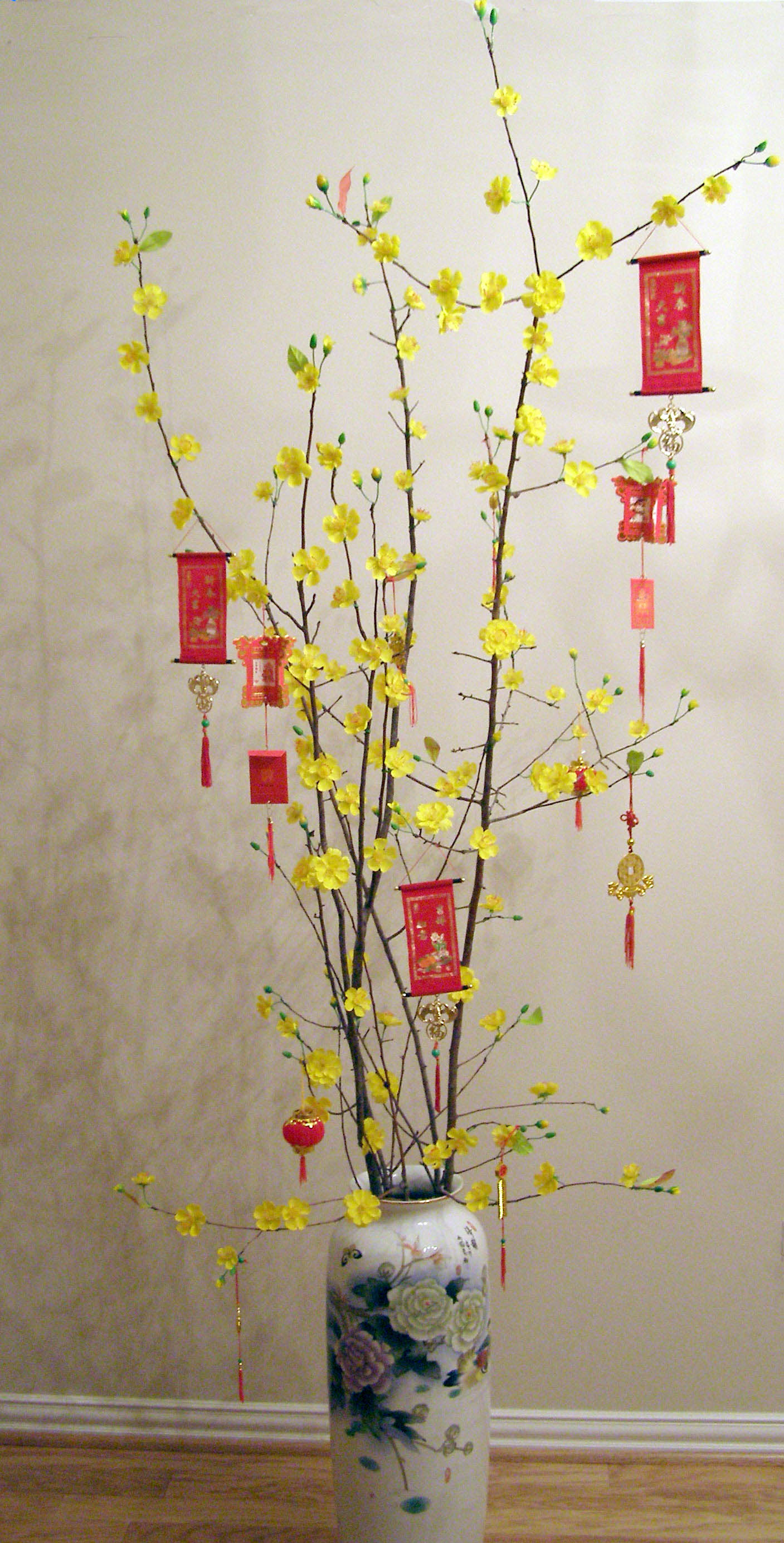
Ochna blossoms (hoa mai)

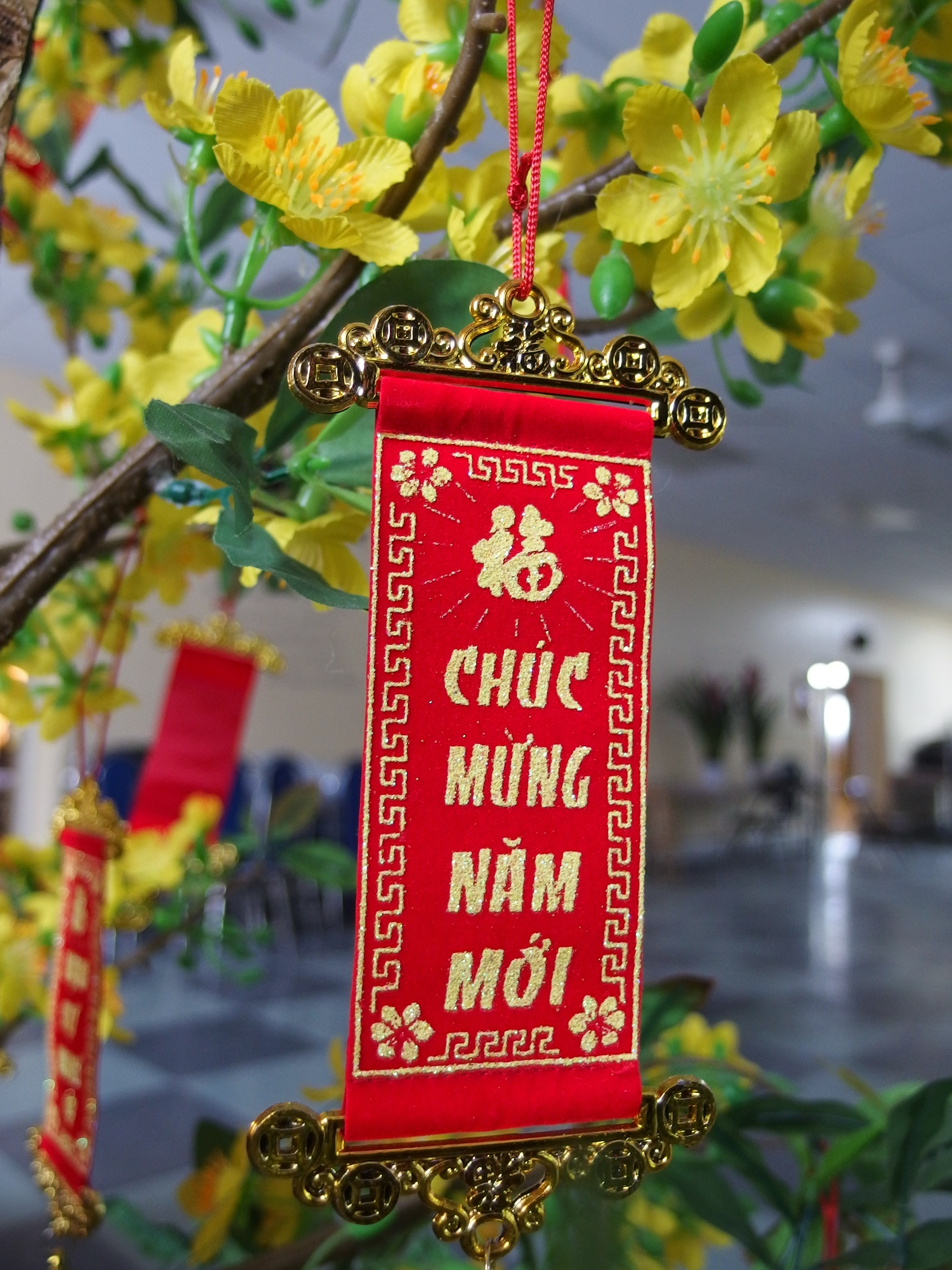
Chúc mừng năm mới translates to "Happy New Year"

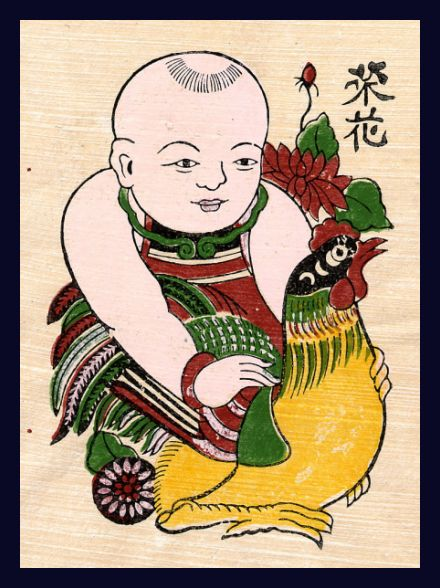
Đông Hồ paintings are traditionally hung as decoration of Tết

== Greetings ==
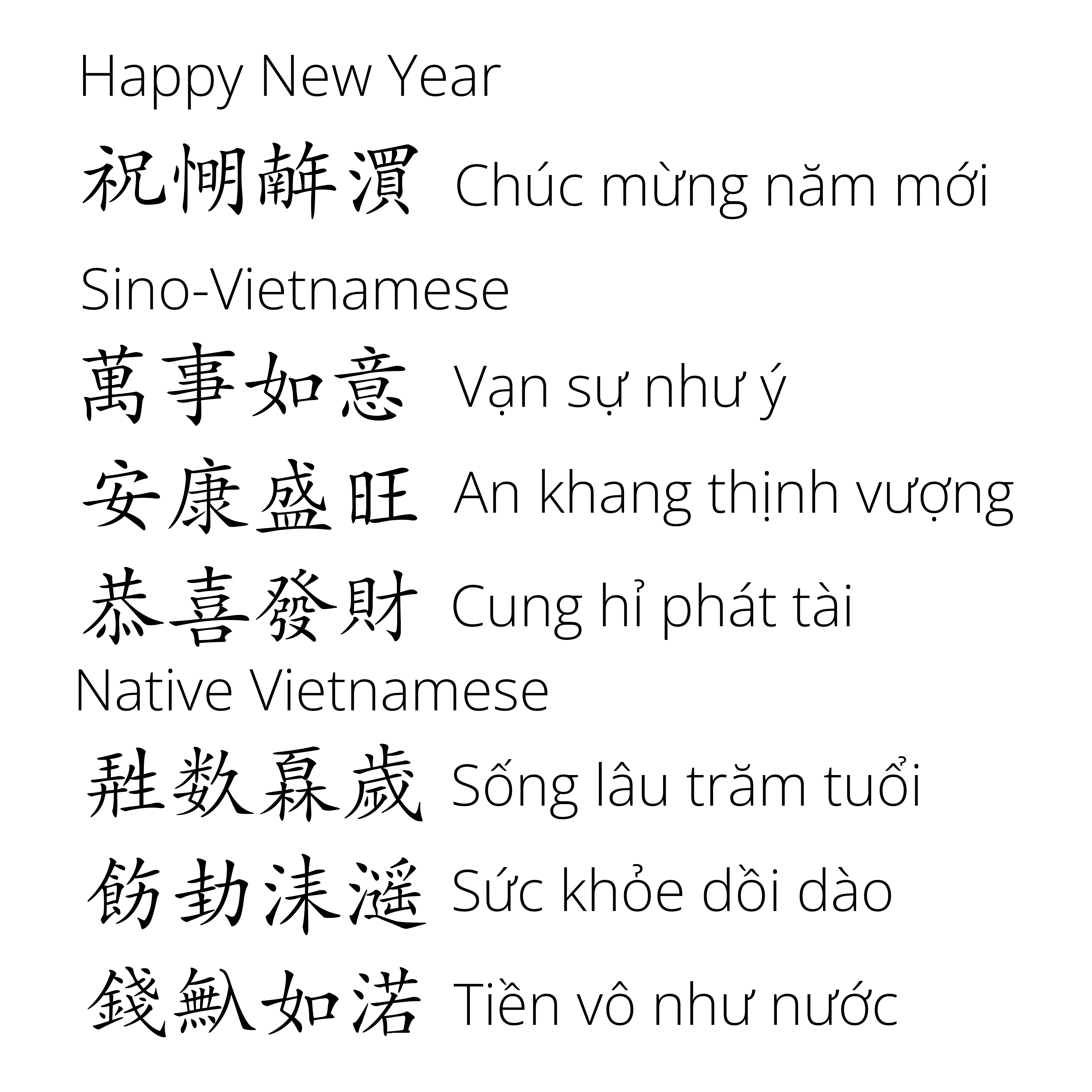
Tết greetings shown in here in the Vietnamese alphabet, Chữ Hán and chữ Nôm.

The traditional greetings are "Chúc mừng năm mới" (祝𢜠𢆥㵋, happy new year) and "Cung chúc tân xuân", (恭祝新春, gracious wishes of the new spring). People also wish each other prosperity and luck. Common wishes for Tết include the following:

- Sống lâu trăm tuổi: (𤯩𥹰𤾓歲, Live long for a hundred years!): used by children for elders. Traditionally, everyone is considered one year older on Tết, so children would wish their grandparents' health and longevity in exchange for mừng tuổi (𢜠歲) or lì xì (利市 "SV: lợi thị").
- An khang thịnh vượng: (安康盛旺, Security, good health, and prosperity)
- Vạn sự như ý: (萬事如意, May things go your way)
- Sức khỏe dồi dào: (飭劸洡𤁠, Plenty of health)
- Làm ăn tấn tới: (爫咹晉𬧐, Be successful at work)
- Tiền vô như nước: (錢𠓺如渃, May money flow in like water). Used informally.
- Cung hỉ phát tài: (恭喜發財, Congratulations and best wishes for a prosperous new year)
- Năm mới thắng lợi mới: (𢆥㵋勝利㵋, New year, new triumphs!; often heard in political speeches)
- Chúc hay ăn chóng lớn: (祝𫨩咹𢶢𡘯, Eat well, grow quick!; aimed at children)
- Năm mới thăng quan tiến chức: (𢆥㵋陞官進織, I wish for you to be promoted in the new year!)
- Năm mới toàn gia bình an: (𢆥㵋全家平安, I wish that the new year will bring health and peace to your family!)
- Mừng xuân Di-lặc: (𢜠春彌勒, Happy Spring of Maitreya!). Used by Buddhists.
- Mừng xuân an lạc: (𢜠春安樂, Happy peaceful joyful spring!). Used by Buddhists.
- Chúc mừng Chúa Xuân: (祝𢜠主春, Praise the Lord of Spring!). Used by Catholics.

== Food ==
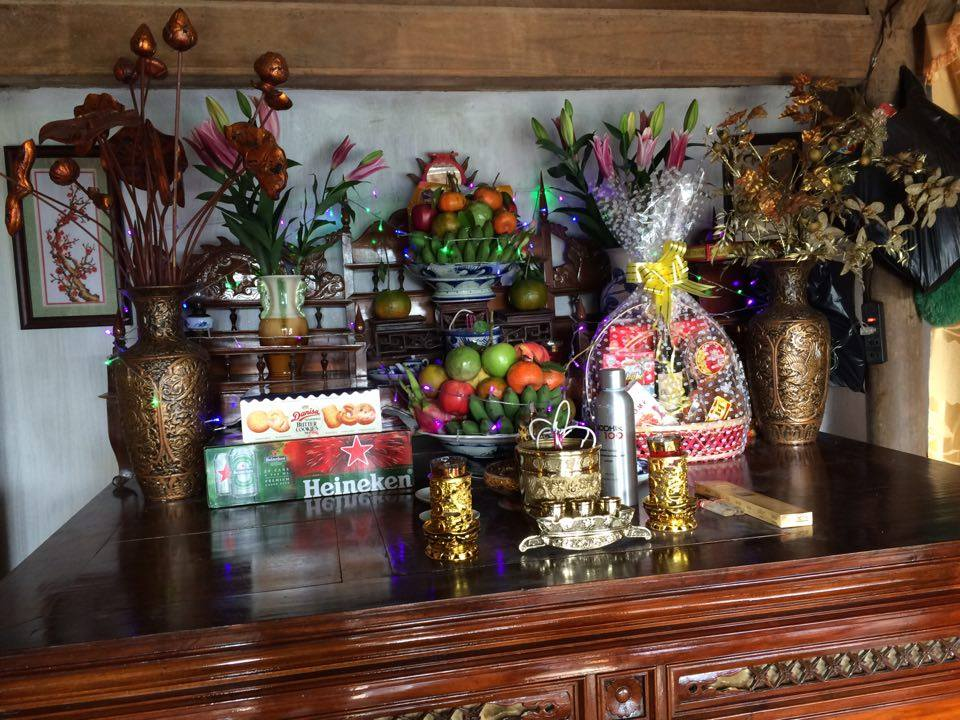
Food offerings for ancestors

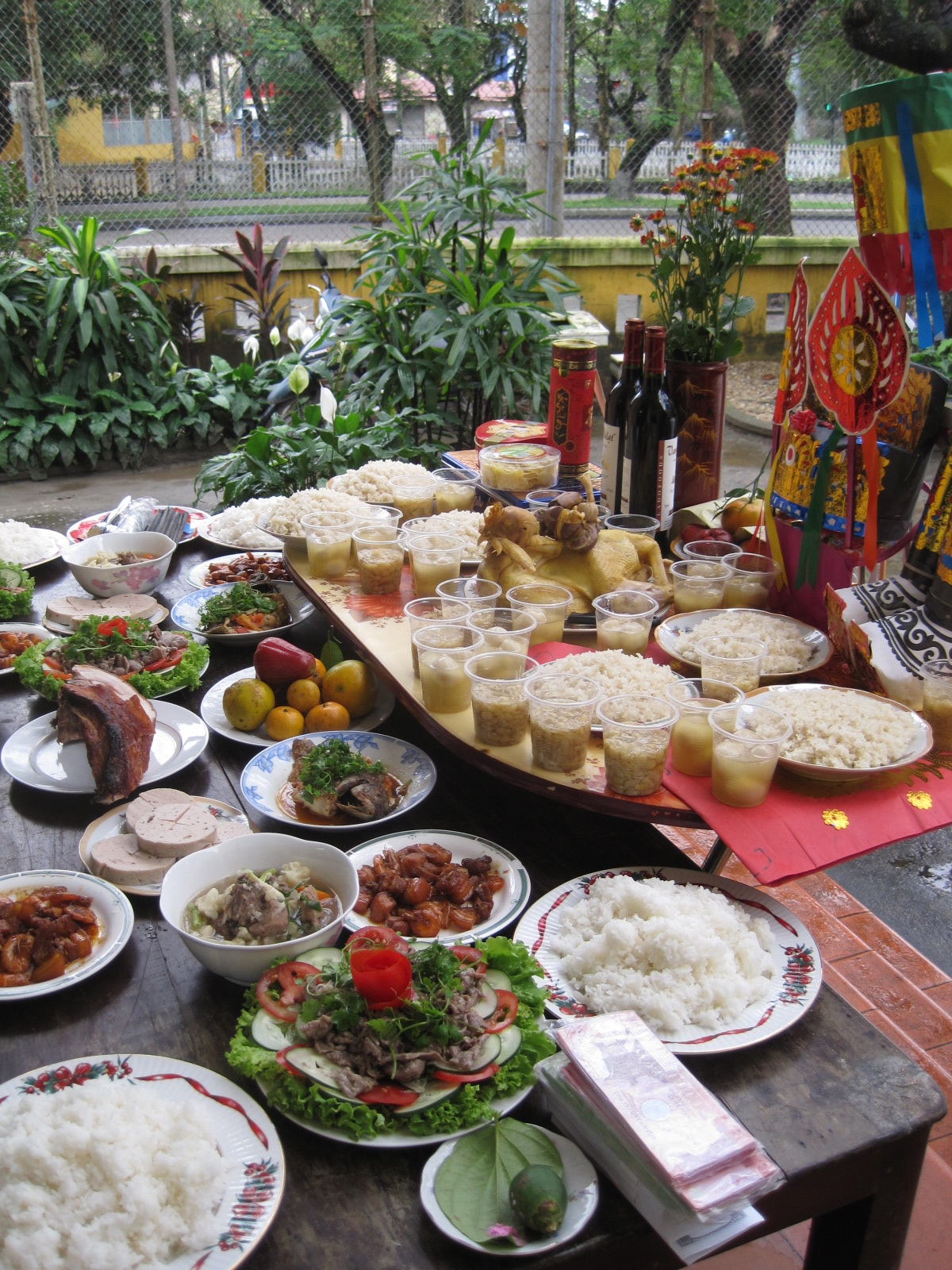
Food offerings to Ông Công and Ông Táo gods

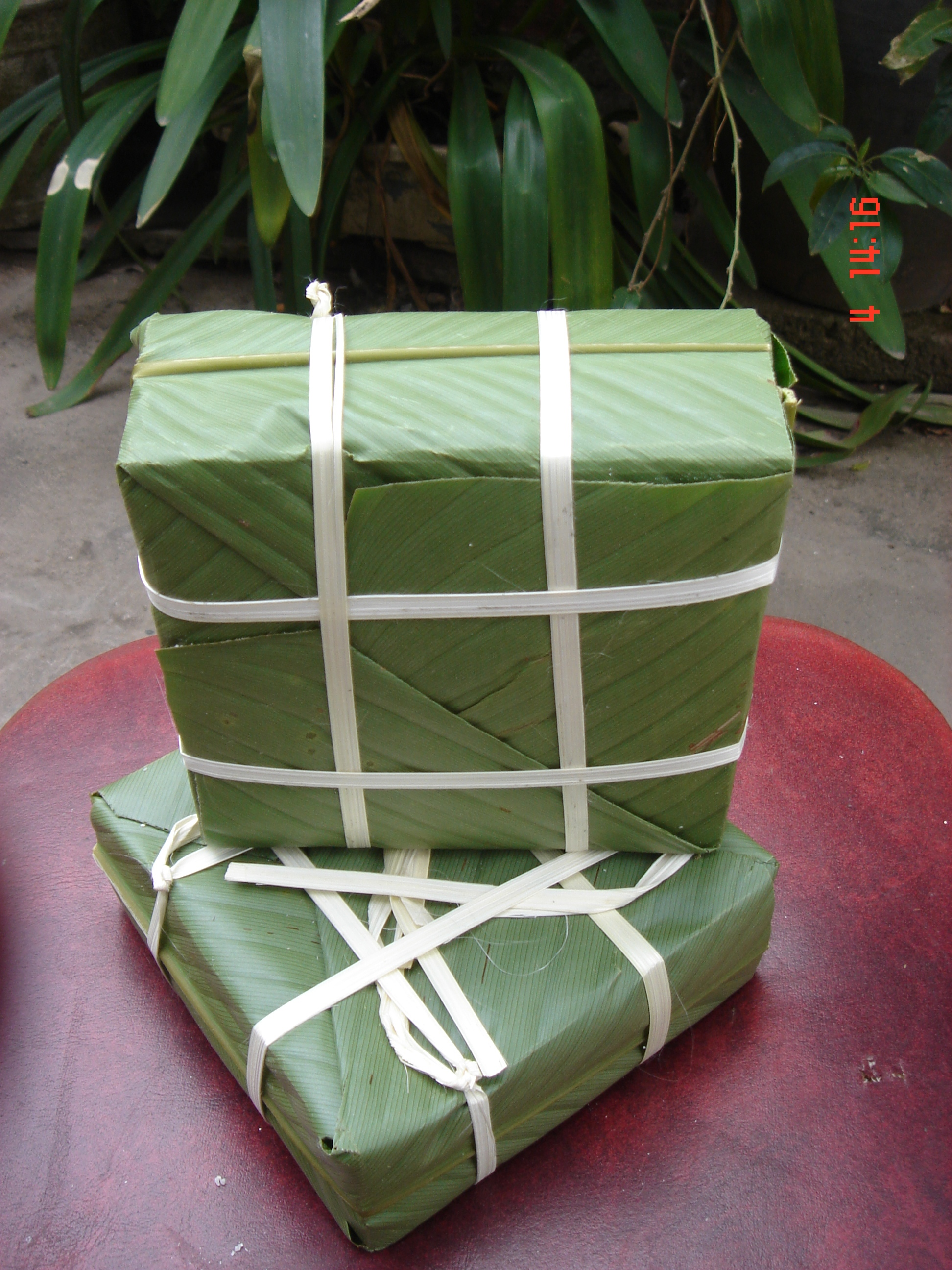
Bánh chưng

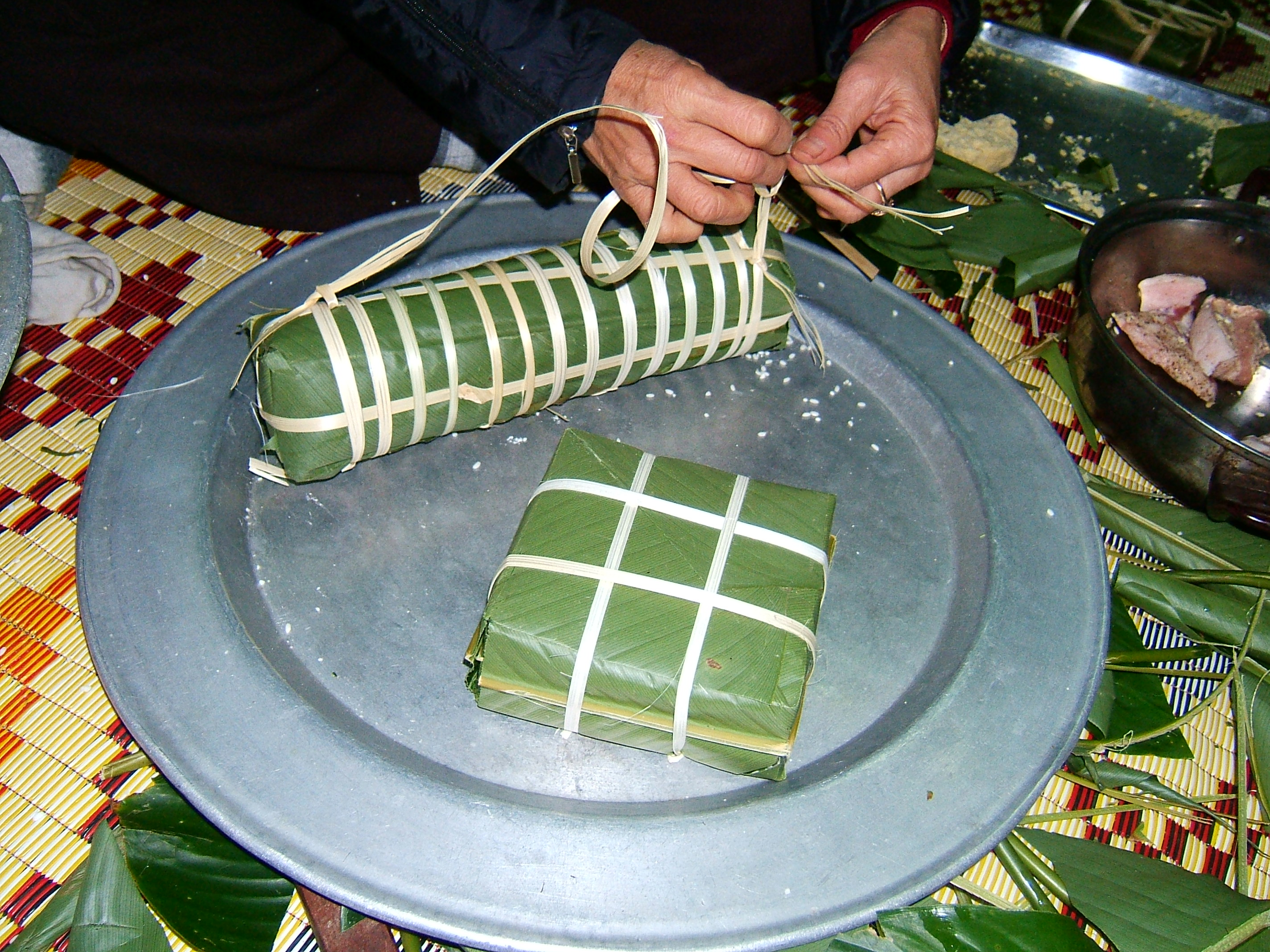
Bánh chưng (bottom) and bánh tày (top, a variation of bánh chưng)

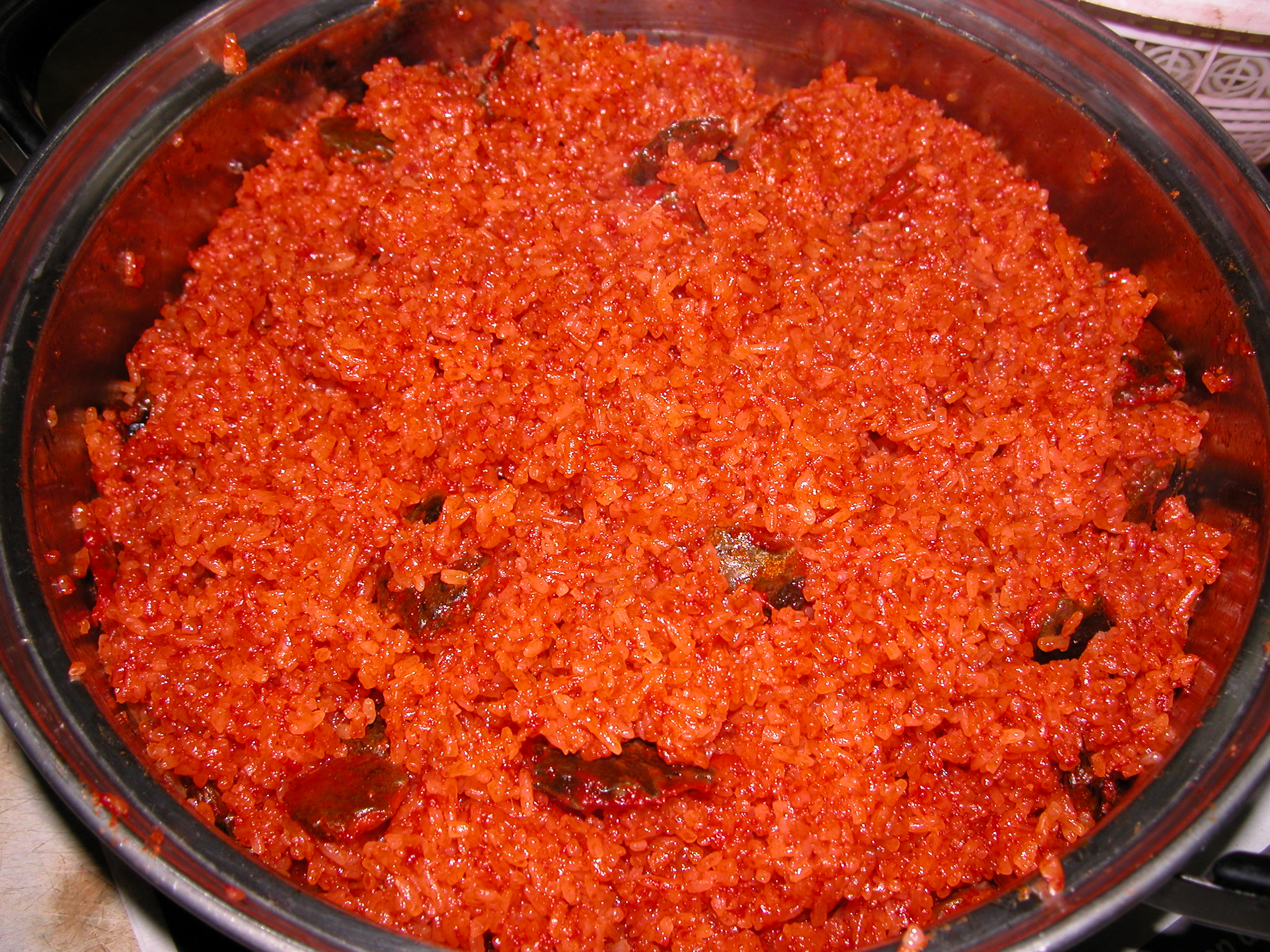
Xôi gấc is glutinous rice cooked with gac fruit, its red color is considered as auspicious

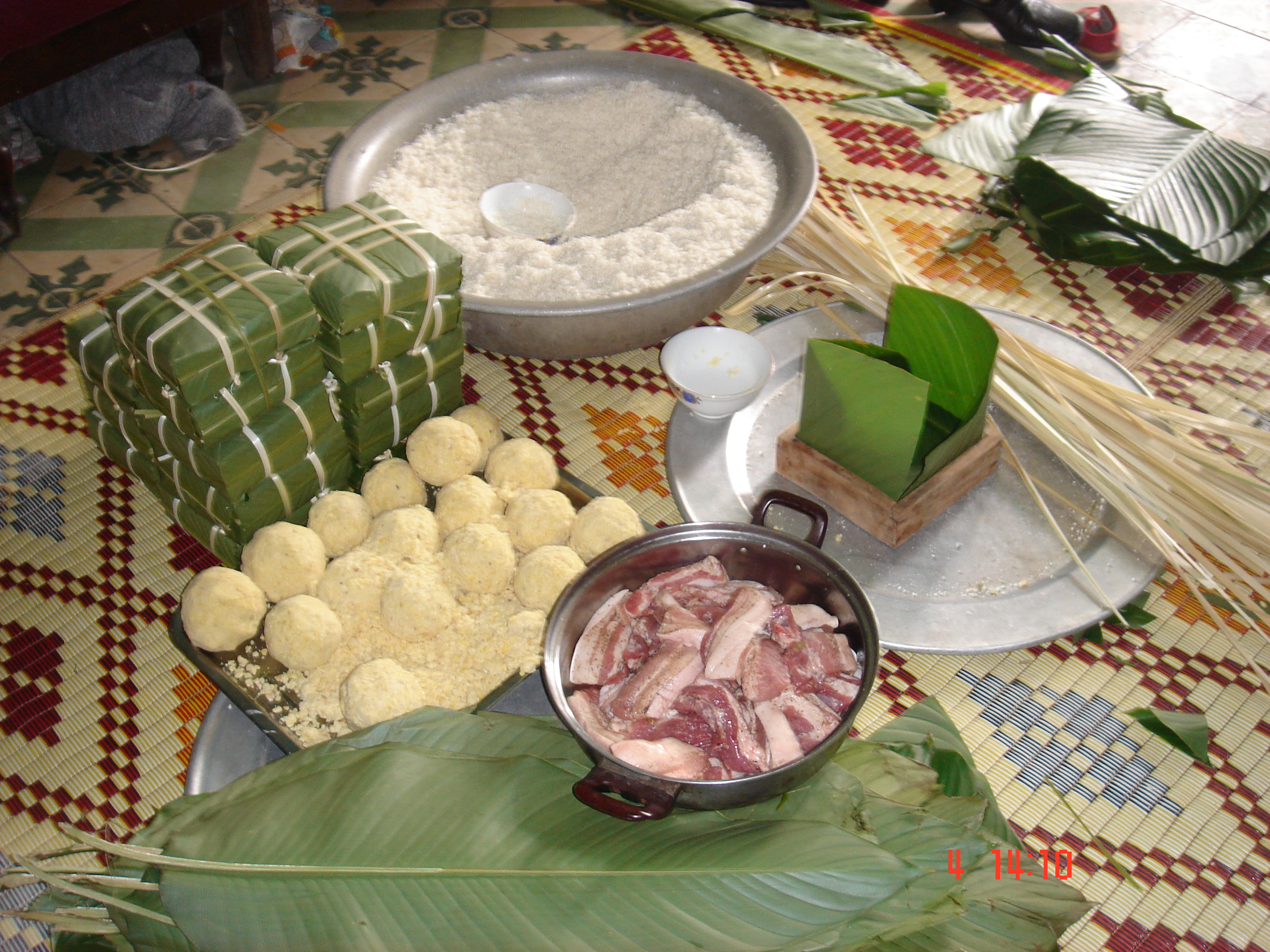
Bánh chưng, bánh giầy being made.

In the Vietnamese language, to celebrate Tết is to ăn Tết, literally meaning "eat Tết", showing the importance of food in its celebration. Some of the food is also eaten year-round, while other dishes are only eaten during Tết. Also, some of the food is vegetarian since it is believed to be good luck to eat vegetarian on Tết. Some traditional foods on Tết include the following:

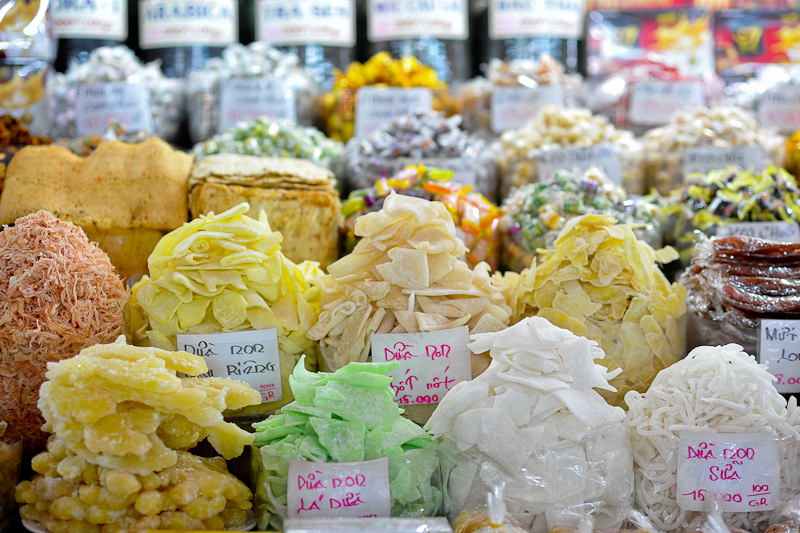
Mứt Tết are candied fruits and seeds eaten during Tết

- Bánh chưng and bánh tét: essentially tightly packed sticky rice with meat or bean fillings wrapped in dong leaves (Phrynium placentarium). When these leaves are unavailable, banana leaves can be used as a substitute. One difference between them is their shape. Bánh chưng is the square-shaped one to represent the Earth, while bánh tét is cylindrical to represent the moon. Also, bánh chưng is more popular in the northern parts of Vietnam, bánh tét is more popular in the south. Preparation can take days. After molding them into their respective shapes (the square shape is achieved using a wooden frame), they are boiled for several hours to cook. The story of their origins and their connection with Tết is often recounted to children while cooking them overnight.
- Mứt: These dried candied fruits are rarely eaten at any time besides Tết.
- Kẹo dừa: coconut candy
- Kẹo mè xửng: peanut brittle with sesame seeds or peanuts
- Cầu sung dừa đủ xoài: In southern Vietnam, popular fruits used for offerings at the family altar in fruit arranging art are the custard-apple/sugar-apple/soursop (mãng cầu), coconut (dừa), goolar fig (sung), papaya (đu đủ), and mango (xoài), since they sound like "cầu sung vừa đủ xài" ([We] pray for enough [money/resources/funds/goods/etc.] to use) in the southern dialect of Vietnamese.
- Thịt kho nước dừa: Meaning "meat stewed in coconut juice", is a traditional dish of pork belly and medium boiled eggs stewed in a broth-like sauce made overnight of young coconut juice and nước mắm. It is often eaten with pickled bean sprouts and chives, and white rice.
- Xôi gấc: a red sticky rice made from gac fruit, typically paired with chả lụa (the most common type of sausage in Vietnamese cuisine, made of pork and traditionally wrapped in banana leaves).

== Forms of entertainment ==
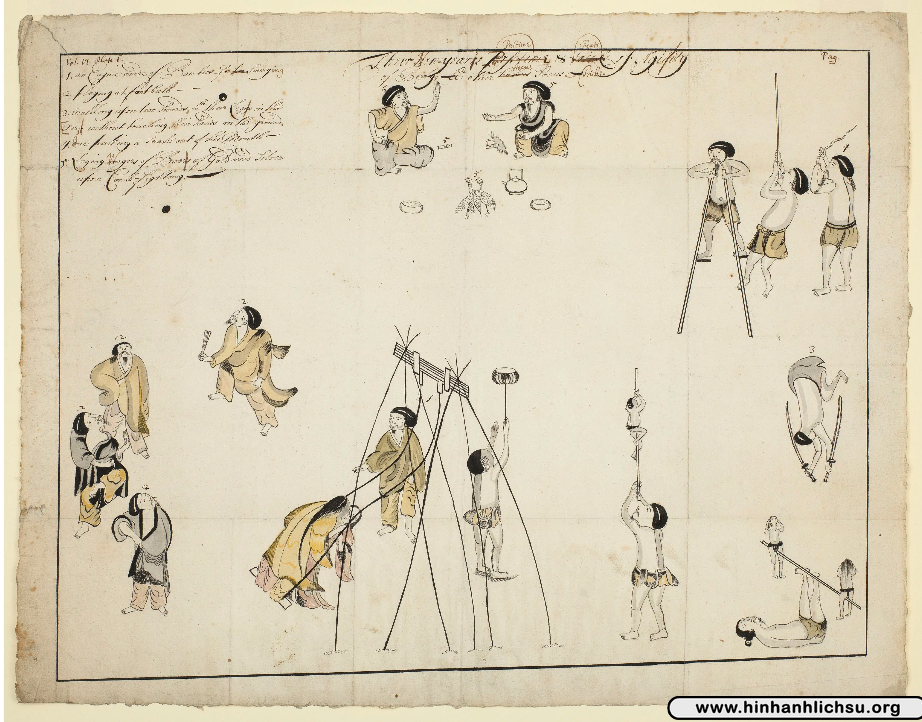
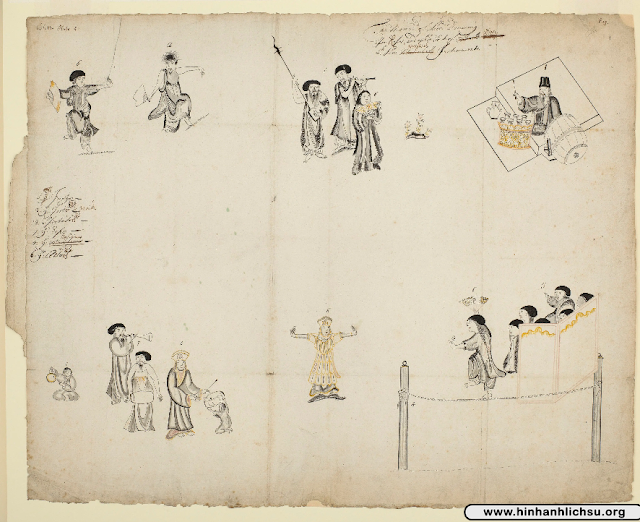
Traditional games on Tết Nguyên Đán in Hanoi during 1600s.
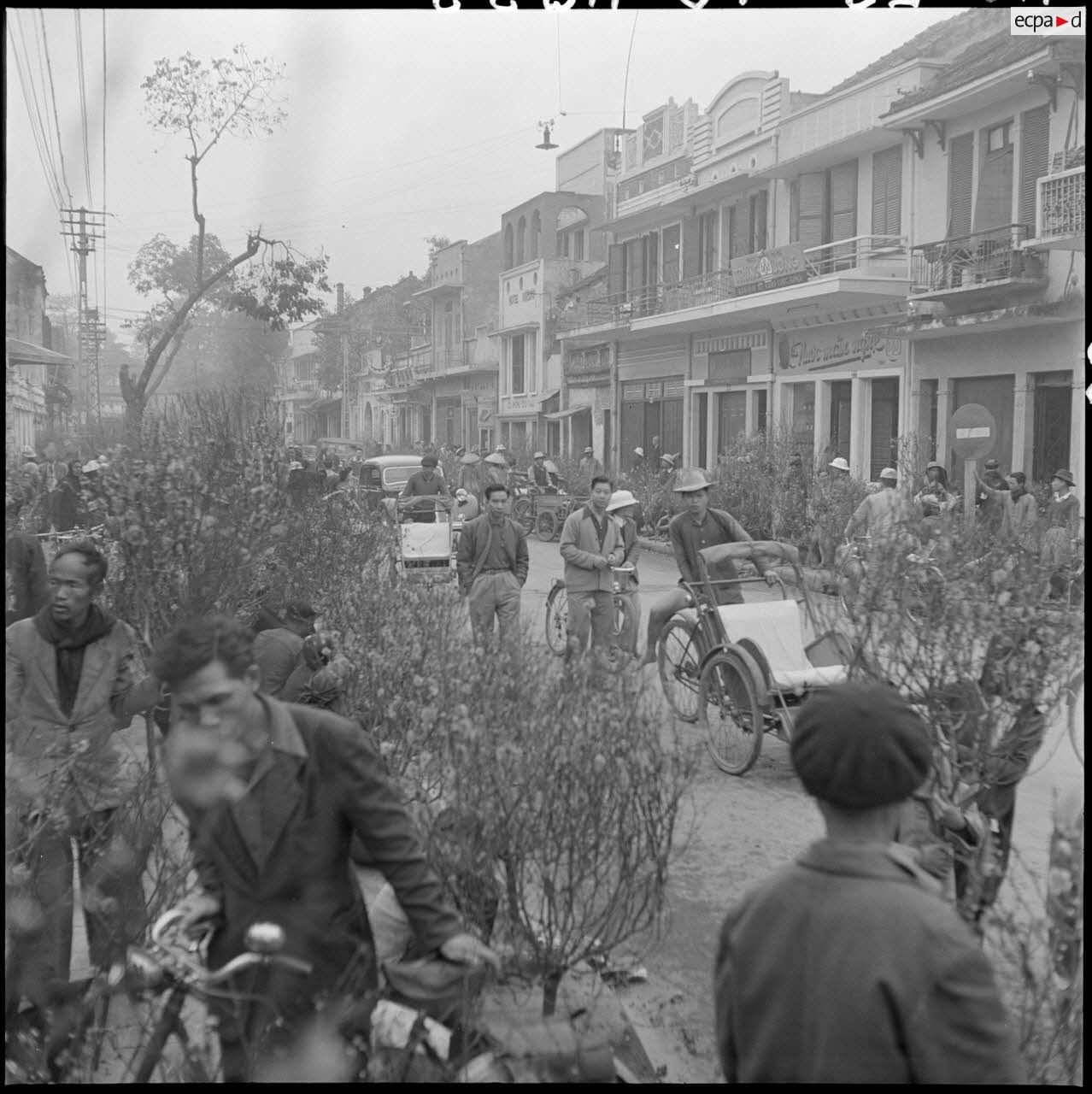
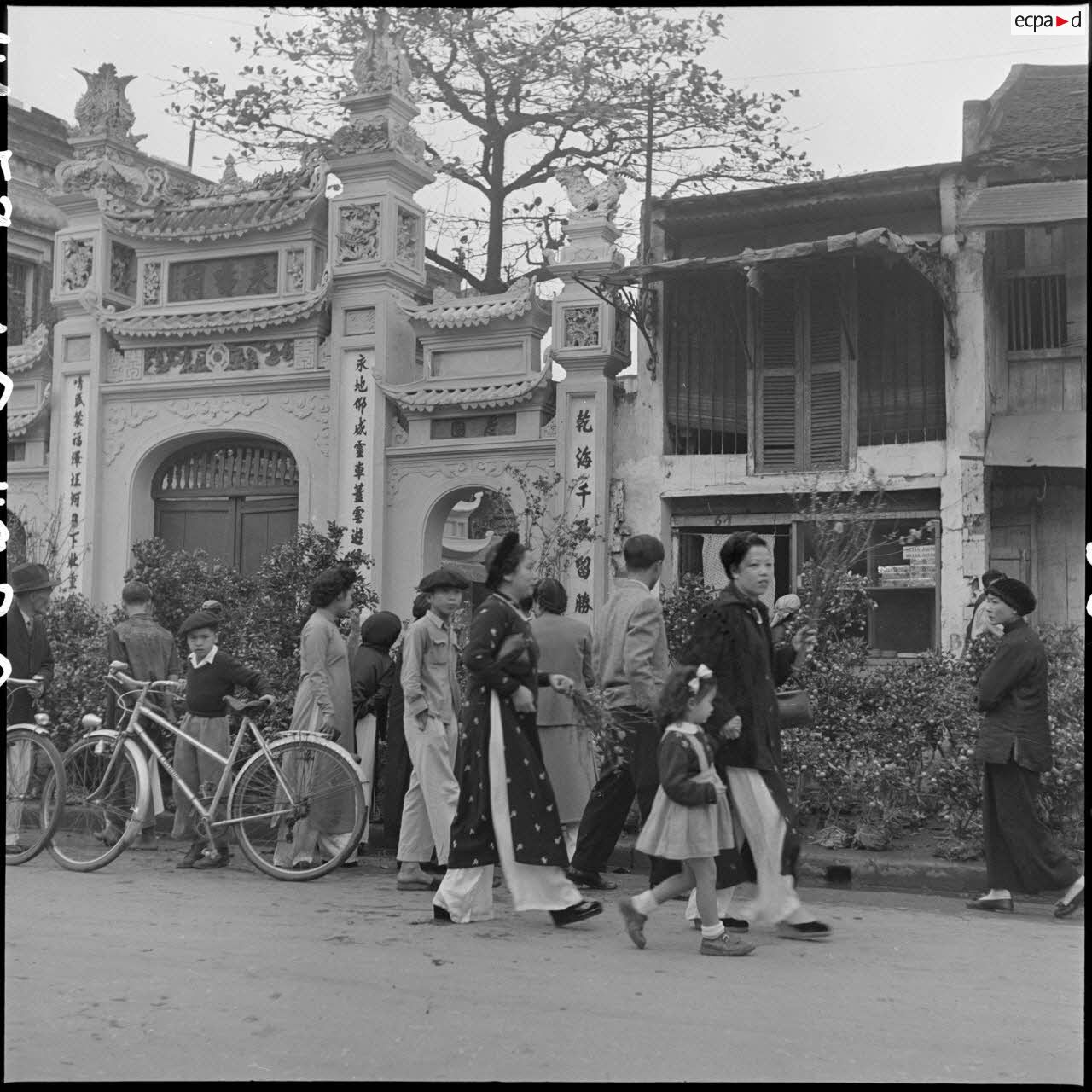
Hanoi Tết plant markets, 1953 in the State of Vietnam

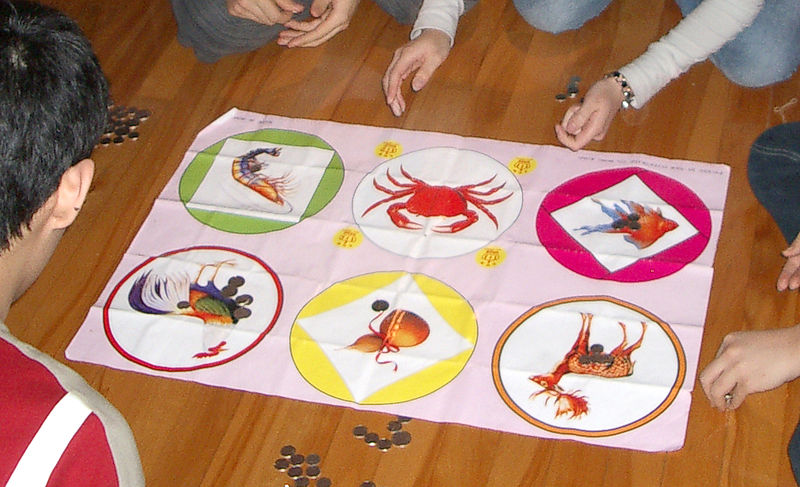
Bầu cua tôm cá is a Vietnamese gambling game that involves using three dice. It is traditionally played during Tết.

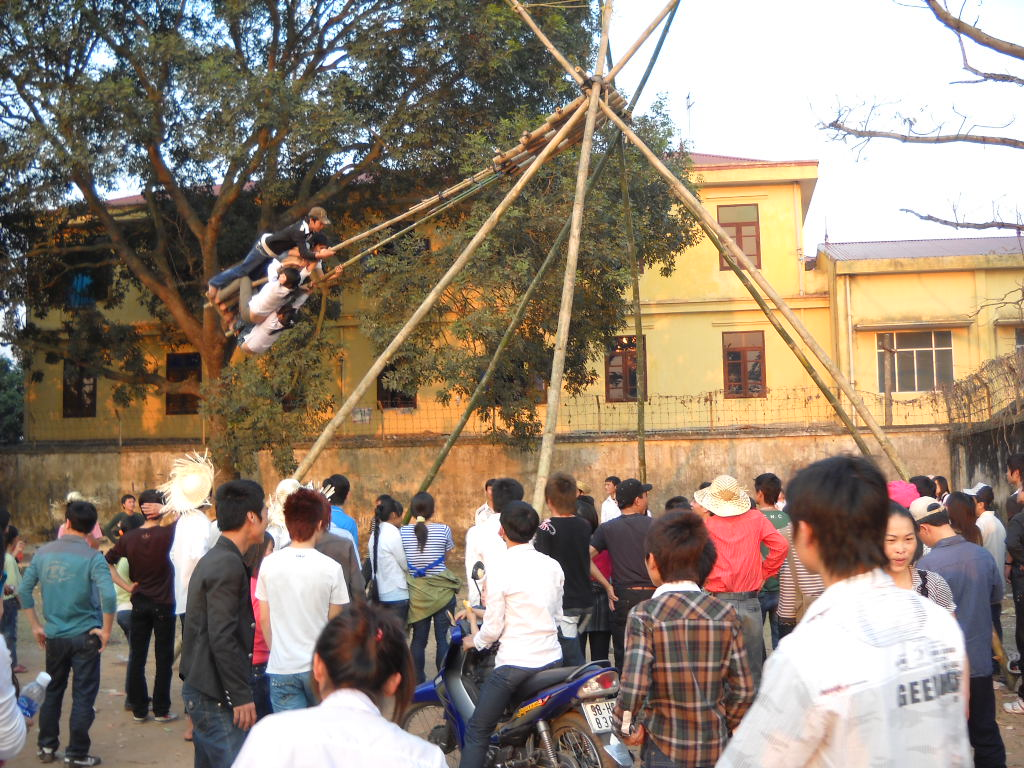
Đánh đu - a traditional game that often appears during Tết.

People enjoy traditional games during Tết, including bầu cua cá cọp, cờ tướng, ném còn, chọi trâu, and đá gà. They also participate in some competitions presenting their knowledge, strength, and aestheticism, such as the bird competition and ngâm thơ competition.

Fireworks displays have also become a traditional part of a Tết celebration in Vietnam. During New Year's Eve, fireworks displays at major cities, such as Hanoi, Ho Chi Minh City, and Da Nang, are broadcast through multiple national and local TV channels, accompanied by New Year wishes of the incumbent president. In 2017 only, fireworks displays were prohibited due to political and financial reasons. In 2021, due to the COVID-19 pandemic, most provinces and cities canceled the fireworks displays; instead, the displays were only held in Hanoi and several provinces with public gatherings prohibited. In 2022, due to the aforementioned pandemic, all provinces canceled the firework displays due to financial reasons. In Australia, Canada, and the United States, there are fireworks displays at many of its festivals, although in 2021 they were either held virtually or canceled. In the United States, a popular show that many individuals engage in is Paris by Night.

Prior to 1995, it was customary to use firecrackers at individual homes; however, the government banned the production and use of these fireworks due to fatal accidents. In December 2020 a regulation was passed that allows "anyone aged 18 and older with legal capacity" to purchase sparklers for special occasions. The regulations went into effect on January 11, 2021.

Gặp nhau cuối năm ("Year-end reunion") is a satirical theatrical comedy show broadcast on VTV on New Year's Eve.

== Dates in the Vietnamese calendar ==
From 2020 to 2043:

Zodiac	Gregorian date	
Tý (Rat)	25 January 2020	11 February 2032
Sửu (Buffalo)	12 February 2021	31 January 2033
Dần (Tiger)	1 February 2022	19 February 2034
Mẹo, Mão (Cat)	22 January 2023	8 February 2035
Thìn (Dragon)	10 February 2024	28 January 2036
Tỵ (Snake)	29 January 2025	15 February 2037
Ngọ (Horse)	17 February 2026	4 February 2038
Mùi (Goat)	6 February 2027	24 January 2039
Thân (Monkey)	26 January 2028	12 February 2040
Dậu (Rooster)	13 February 2029	1 February 2041
Tuất (Dog)	2 February 2030	22 January 2042
Hợi (Pig)	23 January 2031	10 February 2043

== Music ==
In the weeks leading up to Tết, celebratory songs are played throughout Vietnam. One song, Ngày Tết Quê Em (Tết in My Homeland) was released in 2006 by Linh Trang and Xuan Mai, on their album Xuân Mai và Thiếu Nhi Cali 2 Hội chợ Cali. The song can be heard playing in many public places across the country.

The song summarizes some of the main Tết traditions. During Tết, it is traditional for Vietnamese people to travel to their hometowns, hence the lyrics "People traveling here and there."

While the song is not inherently religious, it does reference pagodas, a tiered tower used by Buddhists and Taoists for worship. Many Buddhist altars are set up in the weeks leading up to Tet.

The line "If you're a farmer, you'll gain more" refers to beliefs held by many Vietnamese people about the effects the new year will bring on agriculture. Tet symbolizes the start of the spring season. Farmers traditionally use this time as an opportunity to remember the gods of harvest. The next line, "If you're dealers, you'll earn more" refers to the amount of work retailers do in order to be prepared for the surge of shopping in preparation for the holiday.

== See also ==
- Lunar New Year
- List of Buddhist festivals
- Vietnamese Catholic Lunar New Year
- Celebrations of the Lunar New Year in other parts of Asia:
  - Chinese New Year (Spring Festival)
  - Korean New Year (Seollal)
  - Japanese New Year (Shōgatsu)
  - Mongolian New Year (Tsagaan Sar)
  - Taiwanese New Year (Kuè-nî)
  - Tibetan New Year (Losar)
- Similar Asian Lunisolar New Year celebrations that occur in April:
  - Burmese New Year (Thingyan)
  - Cambodian New Year (Chaul Chnam Thmey)
  - Lao New Year (Pii Mai)
  - Bengali New Year (Pahela Baisakh)
  - Sri Lankan New Year (Aluth Avuruddu)
  - Thai New Year (Songkran)
