= Kho (cooking technique) =

Cooking technique in Vietnamese cuisine

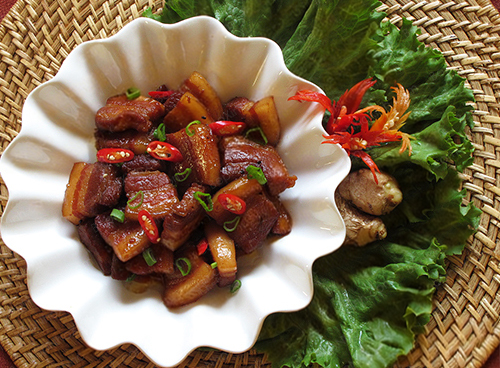
- Thịt kho
- Type: Stew
- Place of origin: Vietnam
- Region or state: Southeast Asia
- Associated cuisine: Vietnamese and Cambodian
- Main ingredients: Nước màu (caramel sauce), water or coconut juice, fish sauce or soy sauce, and spices

Kho (Vietnamese: [xɔ˧], chữ Nôm: 𤋹,𪹜, meaning "to simmer", "to braise", or "to stew") is a traditional Vietnamese cooking technique where a protein source, such as beef, pork, poultry, fish, shrimp, or fried tofu, is marinated in fish sauce or soy sauce and spices, such as pepper, garlic, shallot, and ginger, then simmered on medium-low heat in a mixture of nước màu (caramel sauce) and water or a water substitute, such as coconut juice. The resulting kho dish is sweet, salty, and savory, and meant to be eaten with steamed rice.

== Origin ==
The Vietnamese believe that the kho cooking method was born out of need.

For most of Vietnam's history, its economy was oriented around subsistence agriculture and subsistence fishing and did not generate a great deal of wealth. Most Vietnamese were, therefore, just poor peasants, who worked as farmers and fishermen, trying to make ends meet. Kho was created and became popular within their demographic because it helped them stretch the very limited budgets that they had for food in two distinct ways.

First, kho is a technique where protein sources can be simmered for a long time to make them much more tender. Therefore, tougher, and thus cheaper, cuts of meat can be utilized. This appealed to Vietnamese peasants, who did not always have access to more costly preferred cuts.

Second, kho dishes can be modified to encourage eating a great deal of rice and little meat. By adjusting some of the ingredients, these dishes can be made to be mild or intensely sweet and/or salty. The latter option forces diners to consume: (1) less of the kho dish, which is mainly meat, the most expensive part of the meal, and (2) much more rice, which makes up the cheapest component of the meal. Appetites can, thus, be satiated inexpensively, a plus for Vietnamese peasant families.

From the above reasoning, one can see how kho was born out of necessity during Vietnam's impoverished past. Even though Vietnam has become a prosperous nation following the Đổi Mới reforms that were initiated in 1986, this economical cooking method continues to be employed by a vast majority of the population. Essentially, what started out as just poor peasant food is now served and eaten at the tables of basically all Vietnamese households regardless of socioeconomic status.

== Particular dishes ==
Below is a list of kho dishes from most to least popular:

- Bò kho – A type of beef (bò) stew.
- Thịt kho trứng – A pork (thịt) and egg (trứng) stew.
- Cá kho tộ – A dish of fish (cá) braised in a clay pot (tộ) considered to be very old. The dish is traditionally made using catfish or snakehead fish, both of which are cheap and found in abundance in the Mekong Delta, where the dish is believed to have originated.
- Gà kho gừng – Chicken (gà) with ginger (gừng). Chickens, especially those raised and eaten in Vietnam, can sometimes have a slightly gamey flavor. Chicken kho is usually prepared with ginger to remove this unsavory taste.
- Kho chay – A vegetarian (chay) alternative of braised tofu and mushrooms that is particularly enjoyed by Vietnam's religious majority, the Mahayana Buddhists, who, because of their beliefs, must refrain from consuming meat.

There are also vegetarian versions of all the above kho dishes that use imitation meat in lieu of the animal proteins that the original recipes call for: (1) bò kho chay, (2) thịt kho trứng chay, (3) cá kho tộ chay, and (4) gà kho gừng chay.

As is customary in Vietnam, all the aforementioned mains are served with a side of steamed rice, except for bò kho, which is more commonly eaten with various types of noodles or a simple baguette.

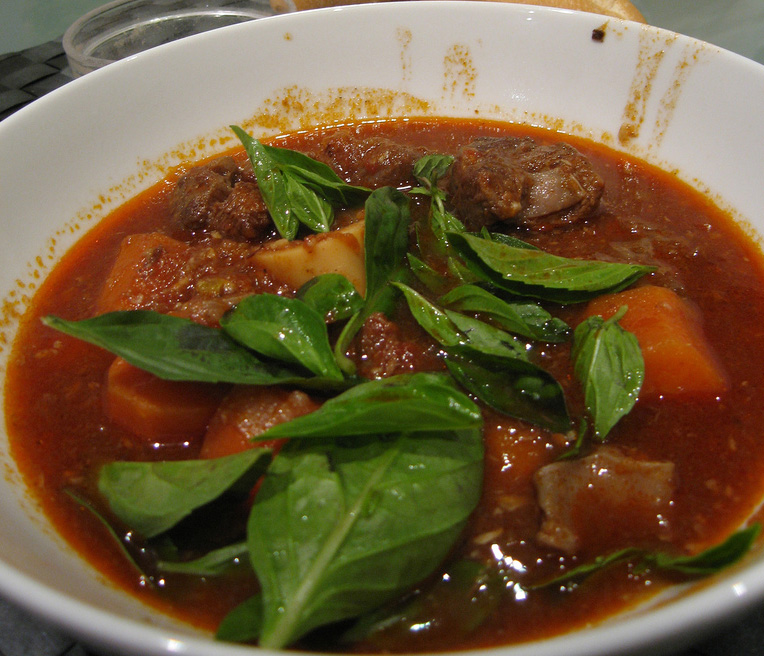
Bò kho

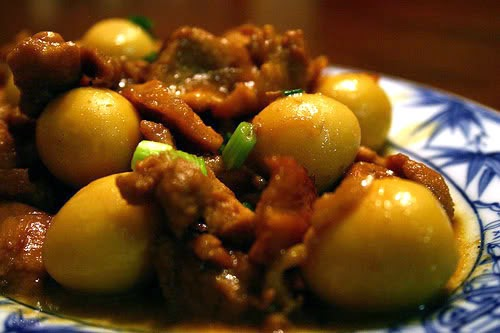
Thịt kho trứng

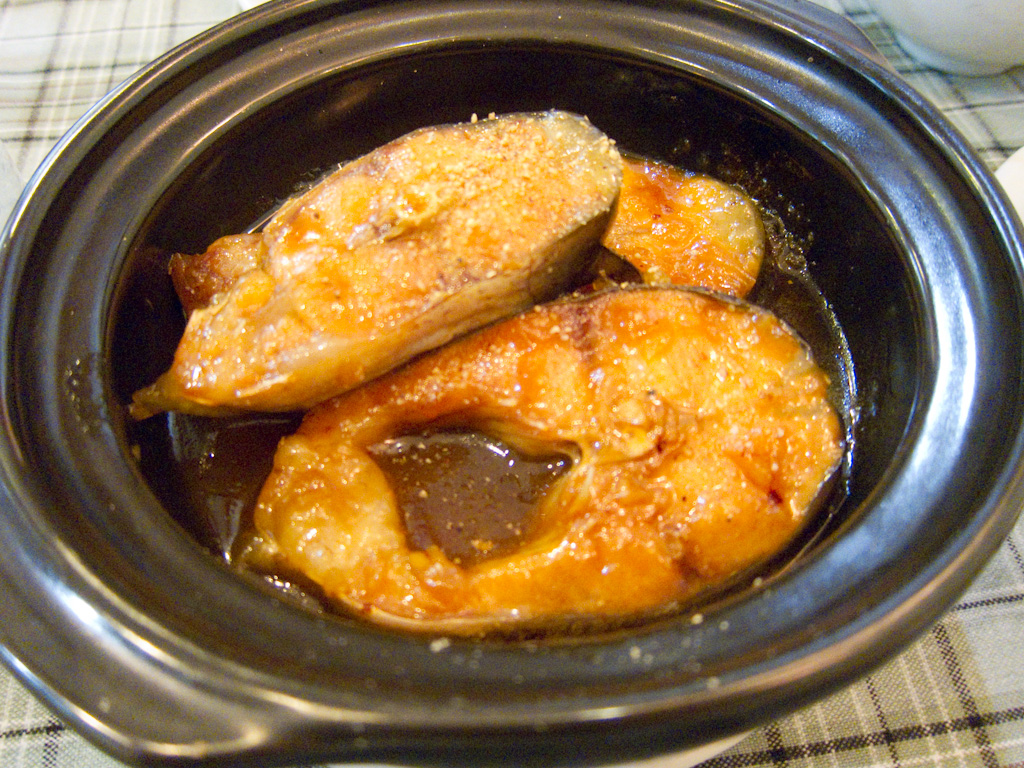
Cá kho tộ

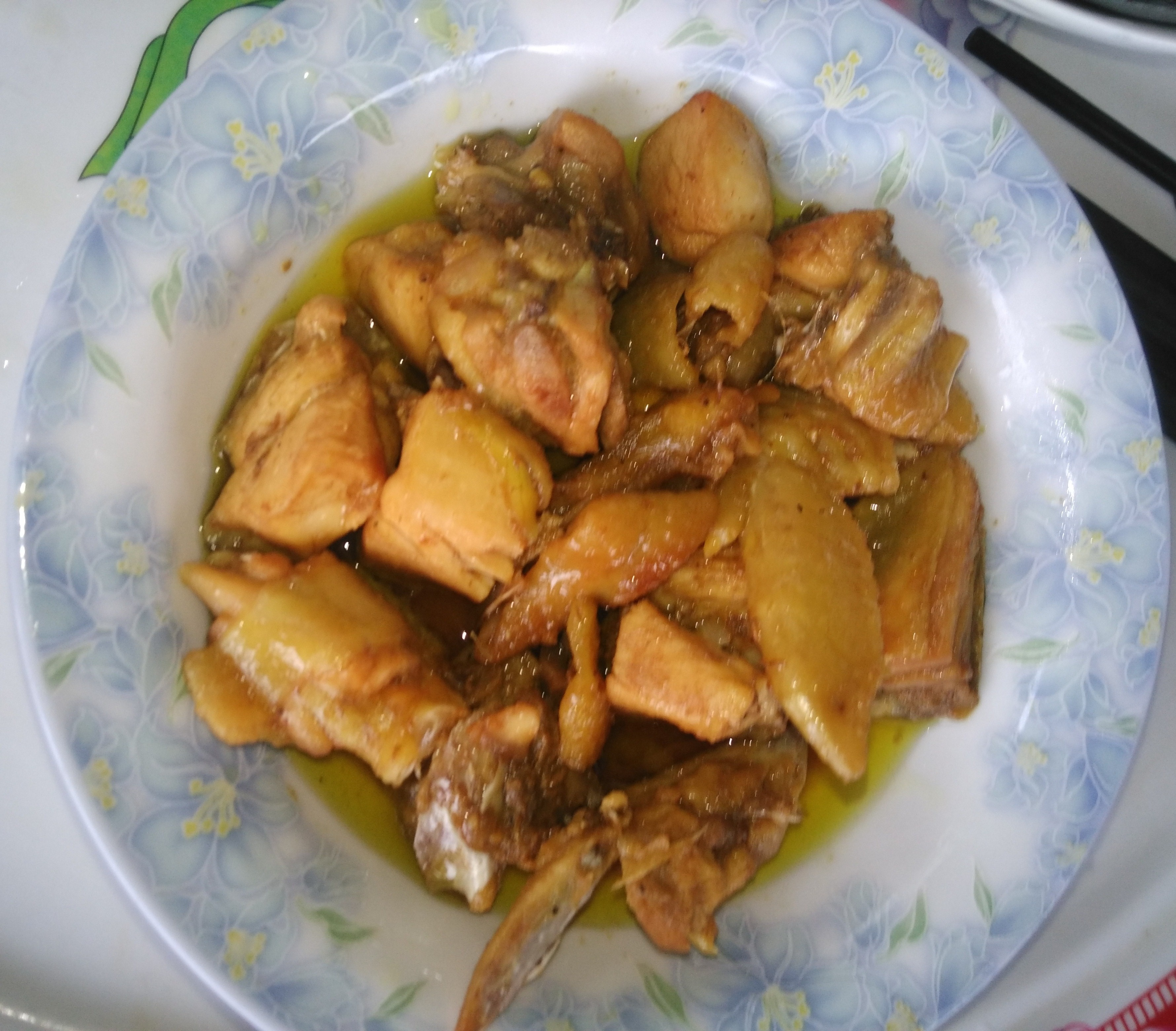
Gà kho gừng

== Popularity ==
This cooking technique has been adopted into the culinary repertoire of neighboring Cambodia, where it is called kha (Khmer: ខ), a loanword from Vietnamese kho.

== See also ==
- Brining
- Jorim
- List of stews
