= Khoisan (disambiguation) =

Khoisan is a catch-all term for the "non-Bantu" indigenous peoples of Southern Africa.

Khoisan may also refer to:

- Khoisan mythology
- Khoisan languages, a group of distinct African languages that use click consonants and do not belong to other African language families
- Khoisan X (Benny Alexander; 1955–2010), South African political activist
