= Benjamin Koe =

English cricketer

Personal information
- Full name: Benjamin Dumont Koe
- Born: 1816; London, England
- Died: 30 June 1842 (aged 25–26); Highgate, Middlesex, England
- Batting: Unknown

Domestic team information
- Years: Team
- 1838: Cambridge University

Career statistics
Competition	First-class
Matches	1
Runs scored	11
Batting average	5.50
100s/50s	–/–
Top score	11
Catches/stumpings	1/–
- Source: Cricinfo, 7 October 2013

Benjamin Dumont Koe (1816 – 30 June 1842) was an English cricketer. Koe's batting style is unknown.

Born in London, Koe undertook his university studies at the University of Cambridge, making a single first-class appearance for the University Cricket Club against Oxford at Lord's in 1838. In a match which Oxford University won by 98 runs, Koe batted twice, being run out in Cambridge University's first-innings for a duck, while in their second-innings he was dismissed for 5 runs by Nicholas Darnell.

He died at Highgate, Middlesex on 30 June 1842.
