= Khoe =

Khoe may be:

- Khoe languages
- the Khoe language
- the Khoekhoe people
- the Khoekhoe language

== See also ==
- Kho (disambiguation)
