= Caramelized pork and eggs =

Vietnamese dish

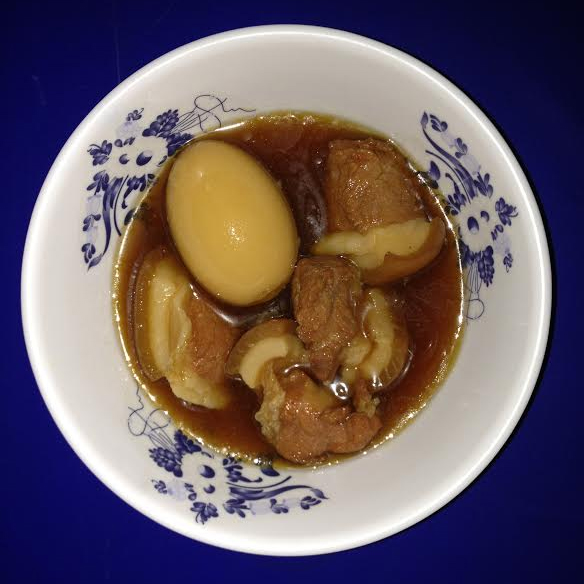
- Caramelized pork and eggs
- Alternative names: Thịt kho tàu; Thịt kho nước dừa; Thịt kho trứng
- Course: Breakfast, lunch, dinner
- Place of origin: Vietnam
- Region or state: Southeast Asia
- Associated cuisine: Cambodian, Laotian, and Vietnamese
- Main ingredients: Pork, eggs, and coconut juice
- Variations: Thịt kho tiêu, Thịt kho nước mắm, Thịt kho tương

Caramelized pork and eggs or thịt kho tàu is a Vietnamese dish that consists of small pieces of marinated pork and boiled eggs braised in coconut juice. Along with being a familiar part of an everyday meal in Vietnam, thịt kho tàu also holds significance as one of the traditional dishes during Tết (Vietnamese New Year). On this holiday, before being served for general consumption, it is offered to deceased ancestors and family members on altars.

== Etymology and origin ==
In the Vietnamese language, "thịt" means "meat" (in this case, pork), while "kho" refers to the Vietnamese cooking technique. The interpretation of the last word, "tàu", has led to several competing narratives about the origin of thịt kho tàu.

The first of these narratives recounts the story of Vietnamese fishermen, who would cook large pots of pork stew to bring along with them on their lengthy voyages. This dish, which is nutritious and keeps well, would give these fishermen the necessary energy to do their labor-intensive job and sustain them for months out at sea. As it could always be found on the boats of these fishermen, the stew became associated with boats, and since the word for "boat" is "tàu" in the Vietnamese language, the dish was given the name "thịt kho tàu".

The next narrative is based on the word "tàu" meaning "Chinese". After the Ming Dynasty was overthrown by the Qing Dynasty, there was a mass exodus of Chinese people to Vietnam. Because these people arrived by boat, the Vietnamese called them "người tàu", where "người" means "people" and "tàu" means "boat". In other words, "Chinese people" were "boat people". The word "tàu" essentially became synonymous with the adjective "Chinese". If the word "tàu" in "thịt kho tàu" means "Chinese", then reason dictates that the dish should be connected to the Chinese, and it is. Thịt kho tàu is believed to have been an interpretation of a dish brought over by the aforementioned Chinese (specifically, the Fujianese) émigrés: tau yu bak (Chinese: 豆油肉), Fujian soy sauce pork and eggs. Though it had relied on tau yu bak as an initial framework to work off of, thịt kho tàu can be considered an entirely different dish as a quick comparison between tau yu bak's recipe and thịt kho tàu's recipe, namely the ingredients used by each dish, reveals. The chief difference between the two is the sauces used in their preparation. Tau yu bak calls for light and dark soy sauce (hence, the name "soy sauce pork and eggs"). Thịt kho tàu substitutes the light soy sauce with nước mắm/Vietnamese fish sauce and replaces the dark soy sauce with nước màu/Vietnamese caramel sauce (hence, the name "caramelized pork and eggs"). Lastly, in lieu of water as the braising liquid, there is coconut juice, an ingredient widely available in Vietnam but not China. All these modifications from Chinese to Vietnamese ingredients resulted in a new, distinctly Vietnamese dish.

The final narrative argues that the word "tàu" in "thịt kho tàu" doesn't mean "boat" or "Chinese" at all. The writer and culturalist, Bình Nguyên Lộc, claims that, according to the dialect of Southwestern Vietnam, "tàu" roughly translates to "slightly salty, slightly sweet" and is commonly used to describe the waters of brackish rivers. Evidence for this includes the word "tàu" in the names of the brackish rivers, Cái Tàu Hạ and Cái Tàu Thượng, located in Southwestern Vietnam. From these insights, Bình Nguyên Lộc came to conclude that the Southwestern Vietnamese had created thịt kho tàu and used the word "tàu" in the dish's name to describe its slightly salty and slightly sweet taste.

Regardless of which of the above three narratives is true, they all share the understanding that thịt kho tàu originated in Vietnam.

== Popularity ==
Over the years, thịt kho tàu has become so popular that it has spread to other nearby Southeast Asian countries, including Cambodia and Laos, where it is called "khor sach chrouk" (Khmer: ខសាច់ជ្រូក) and "thom khem" (Lao: ຕົ້ມເຄັມ), respectively.

== See also ==
- Bak kut teh
- Tết
