= Cây nêu =

Vietnamese New Year tree

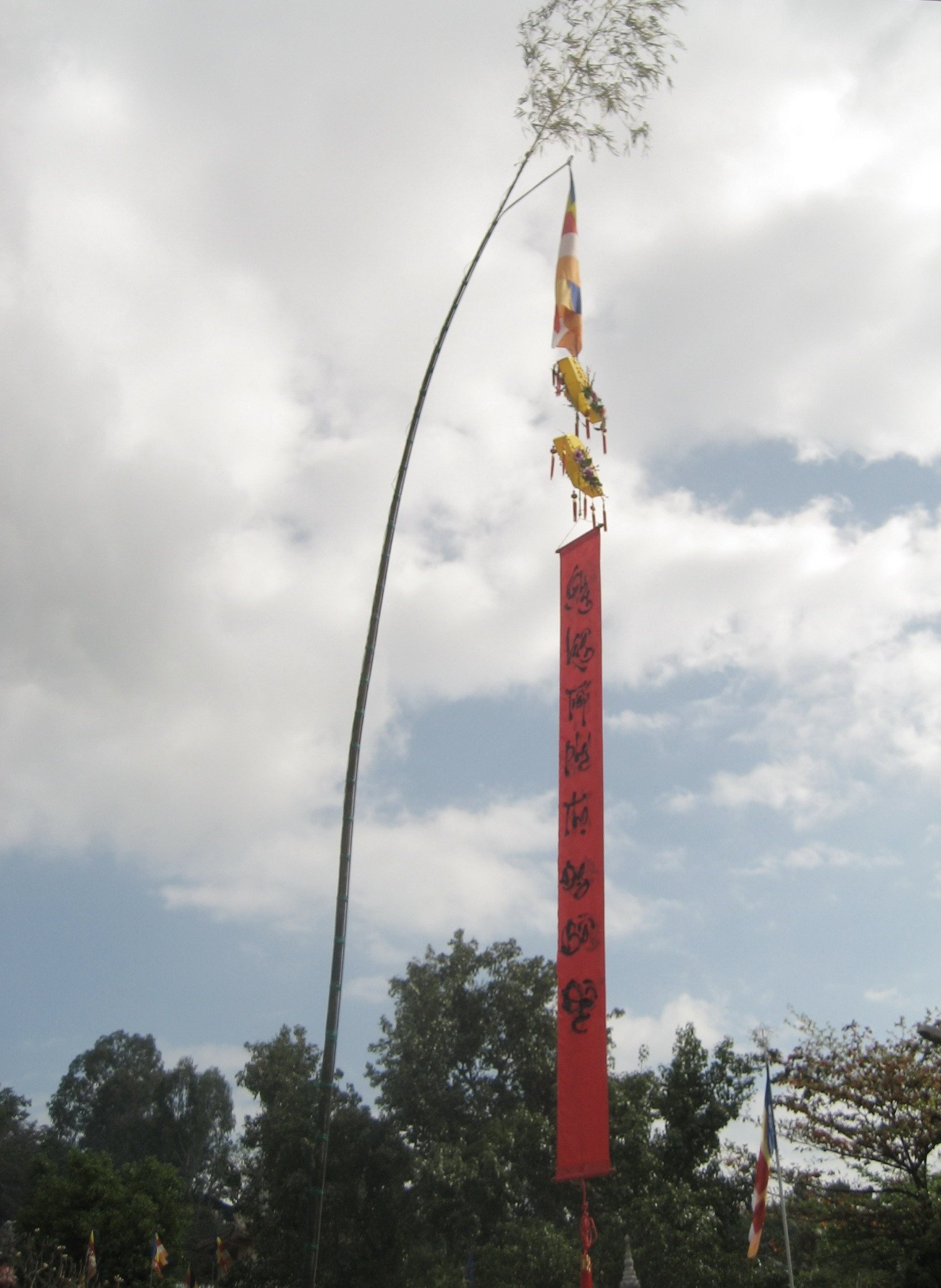
Cây nêu at Long Sơn Temple, Nha Trang

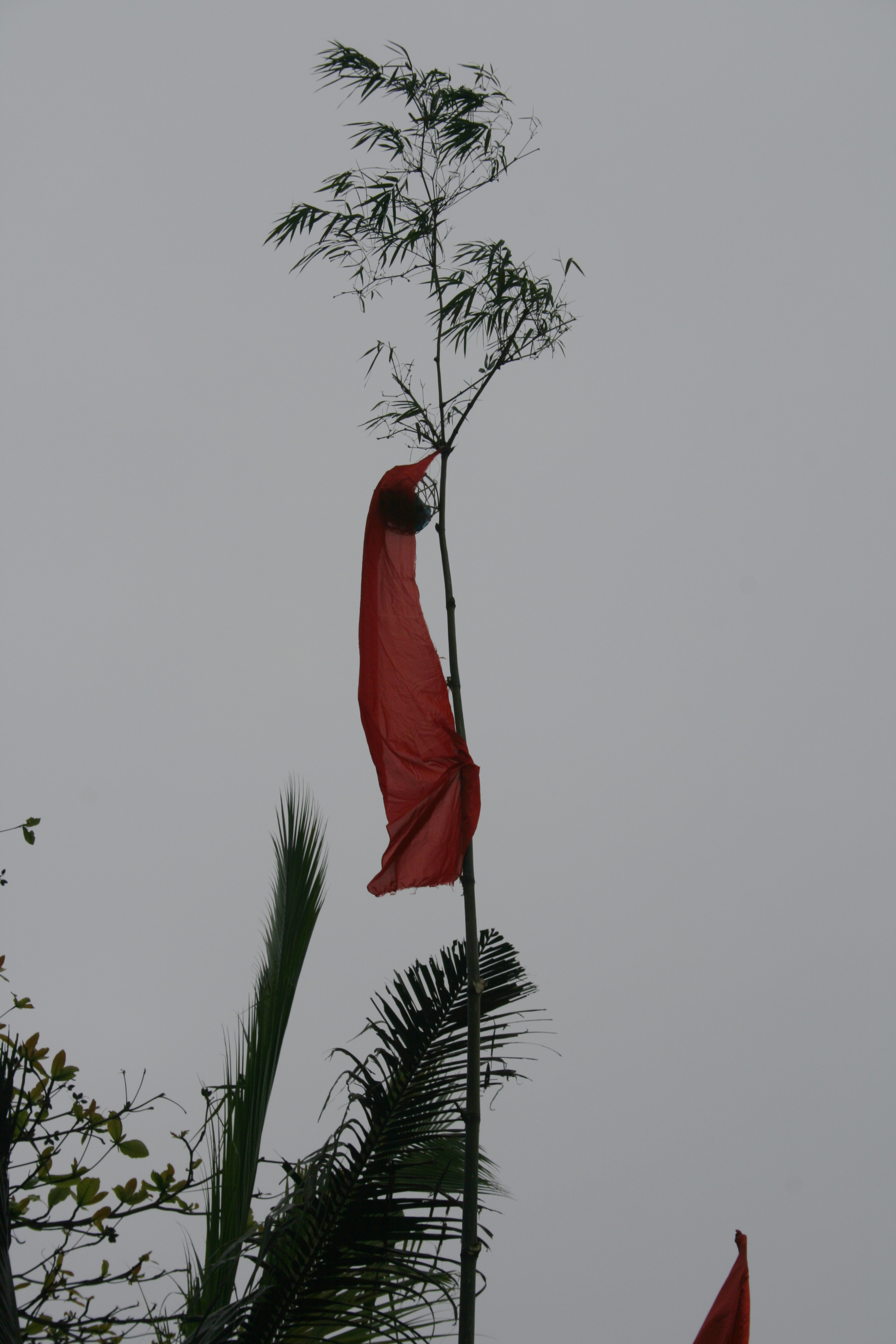
Cây nêu in Tết Nguyên Đán

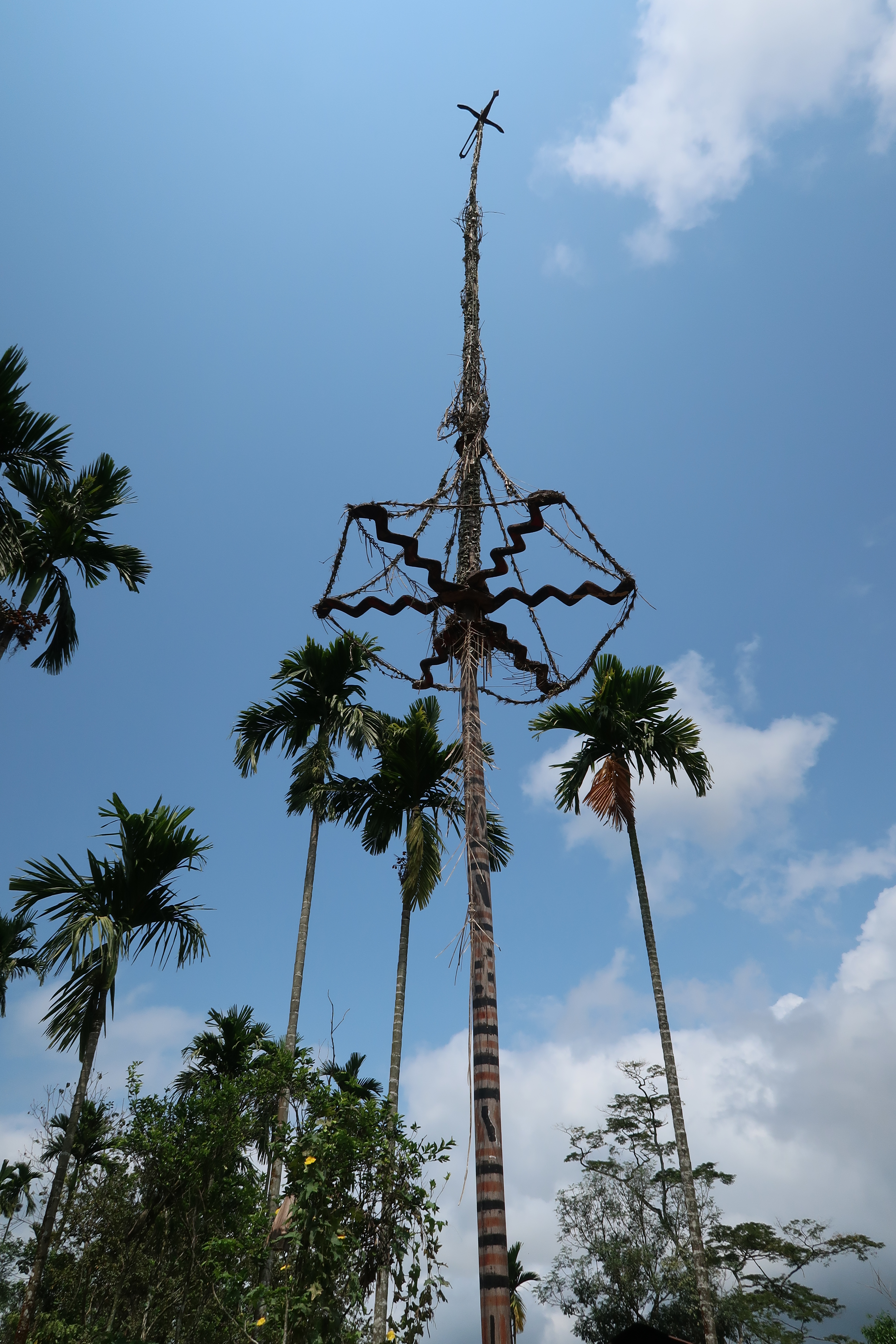
Cây nêu of the Ca Dong people

Cây nêu (chữ Nôm: 核標), is a New Year tree in Vietnamese culture, made from bamboo stalk, which has the effect of warding off evil spirits during the Tết Nguyên Đán, or Vietnamese New Year.

The Viet people set up the cây nêu on the 23rd day of the 12th lunar month, to prevent the devil from coming to disturb the homeowner during the days when Ông Công - Ông Táo returned to heaven. Some other ethnic groups such as Tày and Nùng in the northern mountainous areas such as Hà Giang, Tuyên Quang, Cao Bằng, Lạng Sơn, Bắc Kạn, Lào Cai, Yên Bái again plant this cây nêu on the afternoon of the 30rd day of the 12th lunar month. Hmong people build the cây nêu in the Gầu Tào festival from the 3rd to the 5th day of the first lunar month, the 7th day of the first lunar month is the summer day, the San Diu people build the cây nêu in the Cầu Mùa Festival.

Viet people usually cut down a cây nêu on the 7th day of the 1st lunar month, called Lễ khai hạ.

== See also ==
- Kadomatsu
