= New Year's tree =

Decorated tree similar to Christmas tree

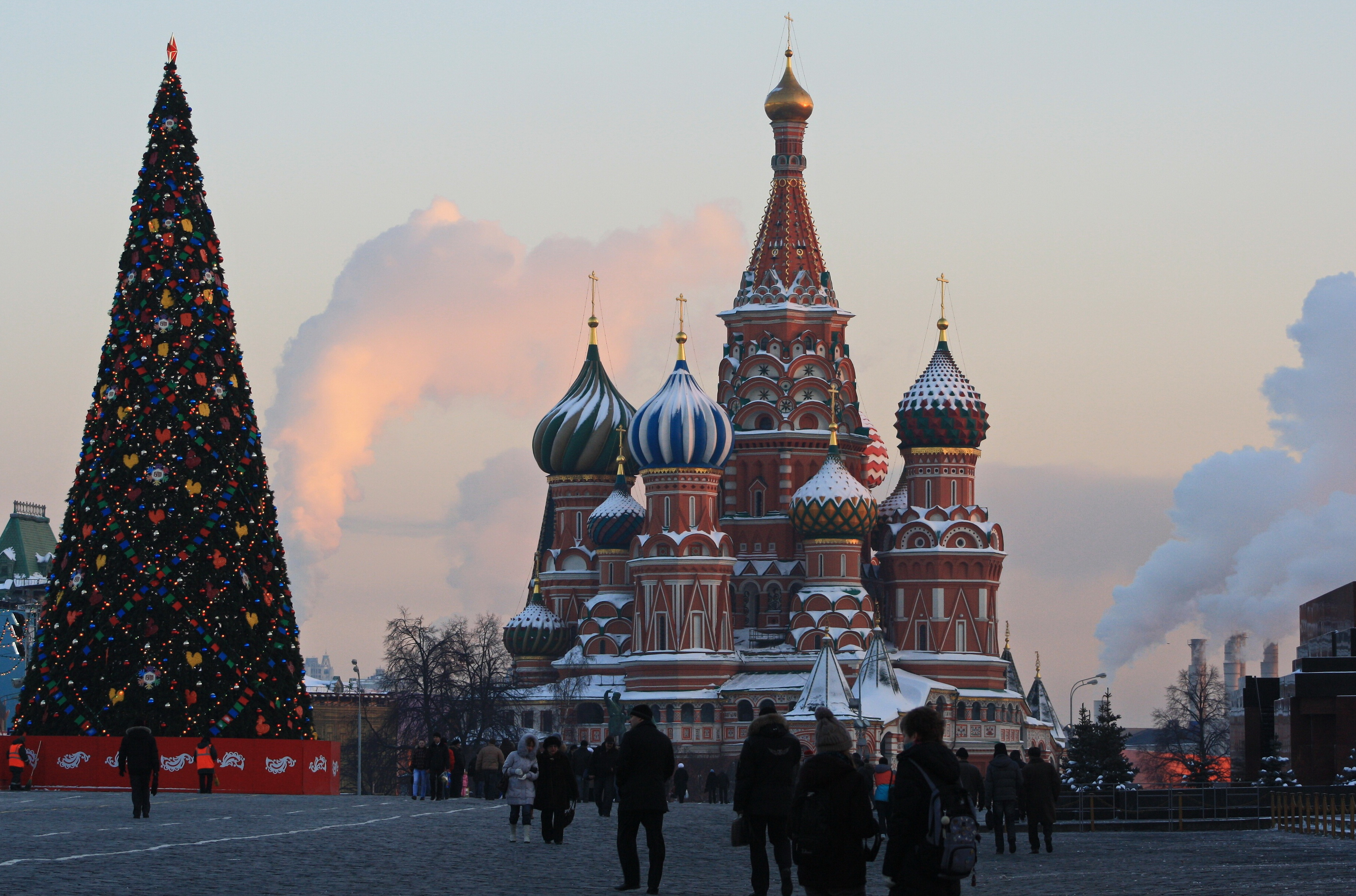
New Year's tree on the Red Square. Moscow, Russia.

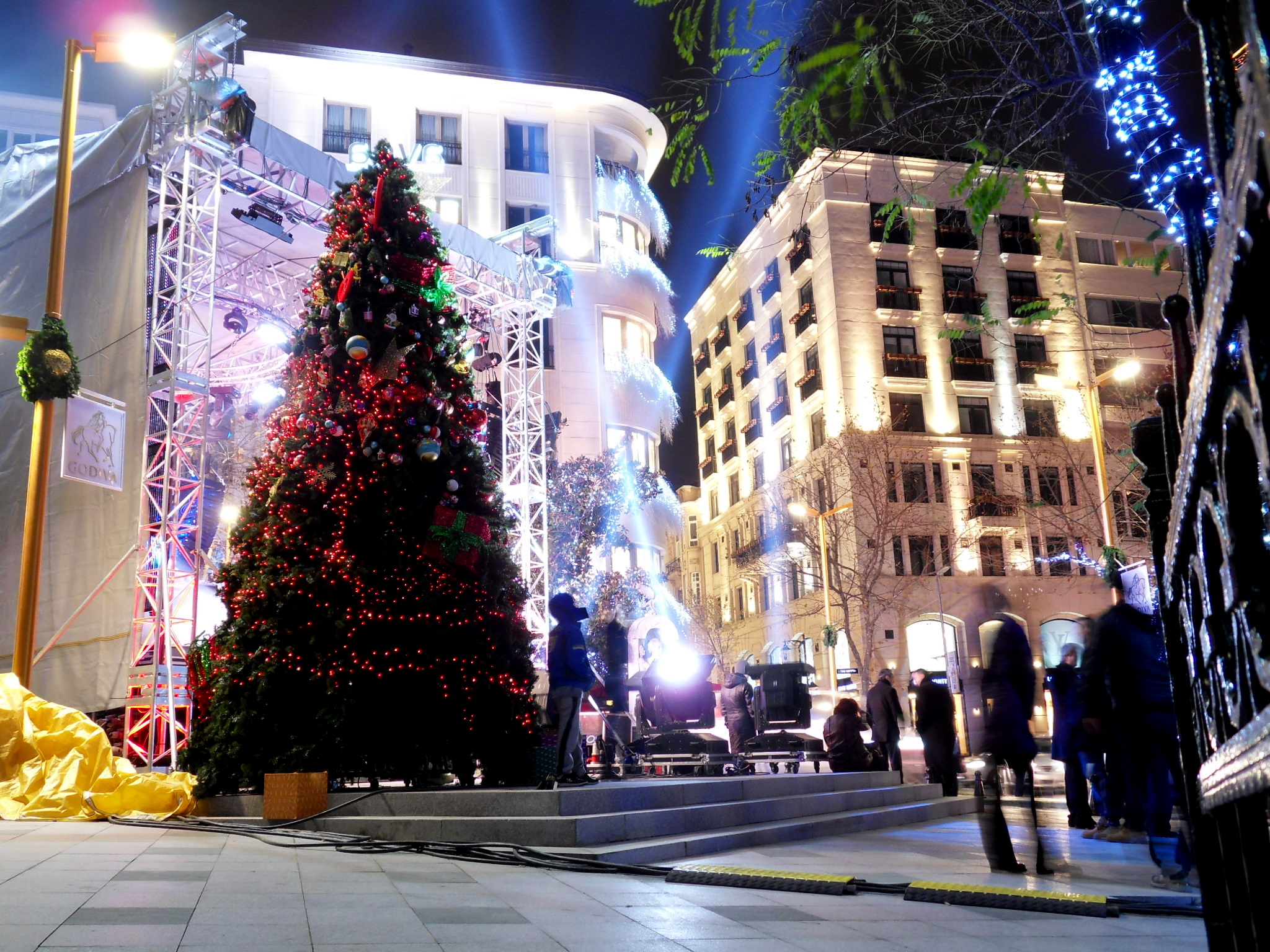
New Year's tree on Abdi İpekçi Avenue in Nişantaşı. Istanbul, Turkey.

New Year's trees are decorated trees similar to Christmas trees that are displayed to specifically celebrate the New Year. They should not be confused with the practice of leaving up a Christmas tree until after New Year's Day (traditionally until the Epiphany on 6 January). New Year's trees are common in various cultures and nations, chiefly the former Soviet Union, former Yugoslavia, Albania, Turkey, China and Vietnam.

== Russian and Turkish traditions ==
Russian and Turkish New Year's trees are of the same varieties as those used for Christmas trees, although a spruce tree is the most usual type. The decorations are the same as for Christmas trees; however the Russian style New Year's tree is completely secular and its decorations include no religious symbols. While Russian and Turkish North Americans purchasing a tree after Christmas when prices have plummeted might enjoy notable savings, most do not wait beyond Christmas to buy their trees.

=== History of the Soviet New Year's tree ===
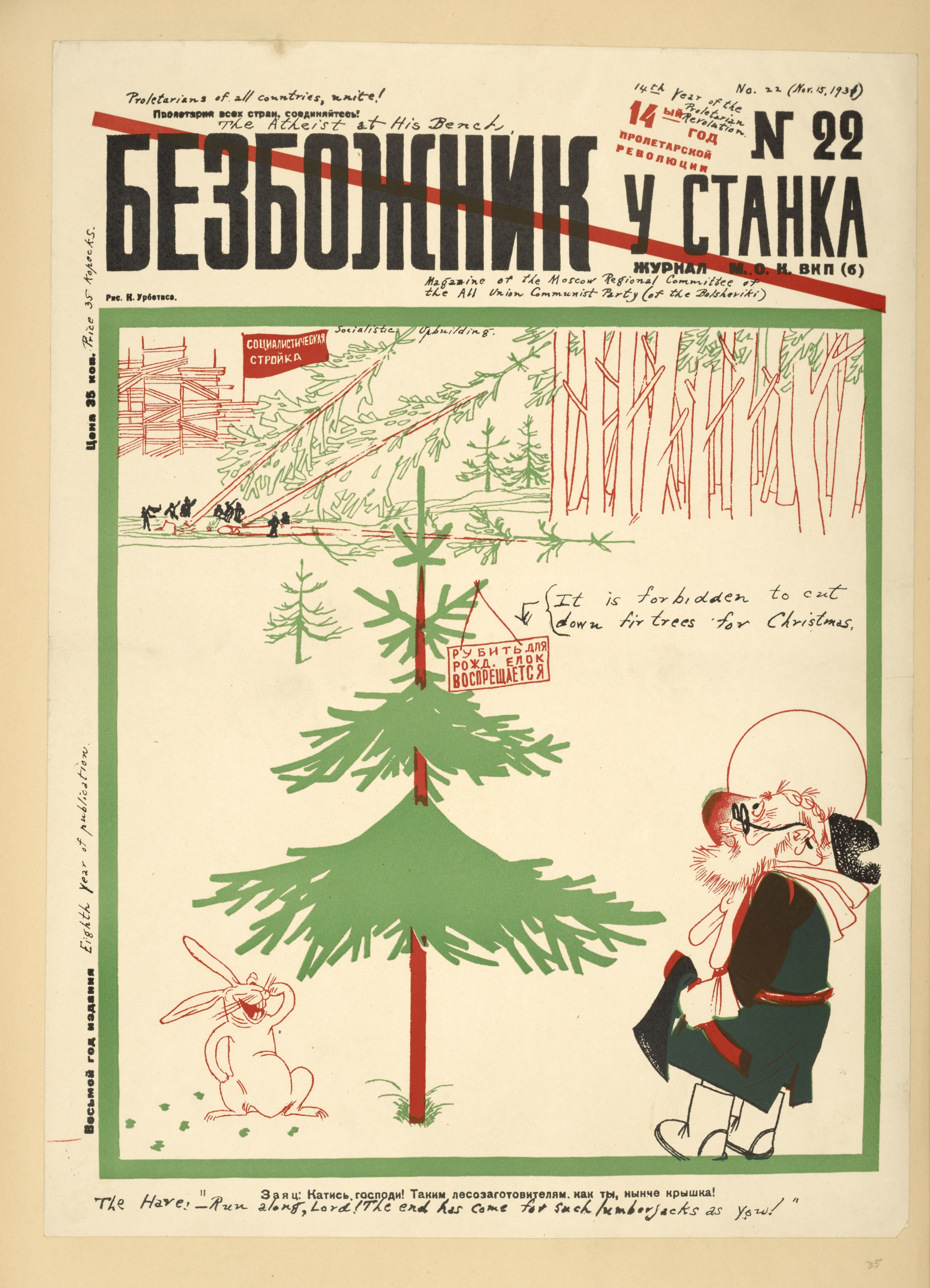
A 1931 edition of the Soviet magazine Bezbozhnik, distributed by the League of Militant Atheists, depicting an Orthodox Christian priest being forbidden to cut down a tree for Christmas

The tradition of installing and decorating a Yolka (cyr.: Ёлка) for Christmas dates back to the 17th century when Peter the Great imported the practice as a result of his travels in Europe. Peter decreed in 1699 that the New Year will be celebrated on 1 January instead of 1 September, and that "Fir tree, pine and juniper branches and trees shall be used to decorate houses and gateways along main streets". However, in Imperial Russia, yolka were banned beginning in 1916 by the Synod as a tradition originating in Germany (Russia's enemy during World War I).

After the revolution of 1917, Christmas celebrations—along with other religious holidays—were discouraged and de facto prohibited as a result of the Soviet antireligious campaign. The League of Militant Atheists encouraged school pupils to campaign against Christmas traditions, among them being the Christmas tree, as well as other Christian holidays, including Easter; the League established an antireligious holiday to be the 31st of each month as a replacement. With the Christmas tree being prohibited in accordance with Soviet anti-religious legislation, people supplanted the former Christmas custom with New Year's trees.

The New Year's tree was encouraged in the USSR after the famous letter by Pavel Postyshev, published in Pravda on 28 December 1935, in which he asked for trees to be installed in schools, children's homes, Young Pioneer Palaces, children's clubs, children's theaters and cinemas. In his letter, Postyshev wrote:

In the pre-revolutionary era the bourgeoisie and the capitalist officials always put up a tree for their children on New Year. Children of the working classes looked on with envy through the windows at the gleaming tree adorned with colored lights and the children of the rich playing around it.

Why do our schools, orphanages, nurseries, children's clubs, and Young Pioneer Palaces deprive children of the working class of the Soviet State of this wonderful enjoyment? Because some "left-leaning" exaggerators decried this pastime as a bourgeois children's indulgence. It is time to put an end to this wrongful condemnation of the tree, which is a joyful diversion for the children. The Young Pioneer scout leaders are called upon to organize holiday celebrations for the children that feature New Year's trees. In schools, orphanages, clubs, cinemas, and theaters – children's New Year's trees should be everywhere! There should not be a single village or community farm where the local board, along with members of the Young Communist League, does not provide a New Year's tree for their kids. City councils, chairmen of district executive committees, village councils, and education authorities must all work to bring the New Year's tree to children of our great socialist motherland. Our children will be grateful to us for giving them back the New Year's tree. I'm sure the Young Communists will take a very active part in this enterprise and do away with the silly misconception that the New Year's tree is a bourgeois excess.

So, let's organize a New Year's celebration for kids and arrange a good Soviet New Year's tree in all our cities and rural villages!"

In 1937, a Yolka (Novy God tree) was also installed in the Moscow House of the Unions. An invitation to the Yolka at the Palace of Unions became a matter of honour for Soviet children. After the dissolution of the USSR, stigma against religion subsided amidst renewed public interest.

=== History of the Turkish New Year's tree ===
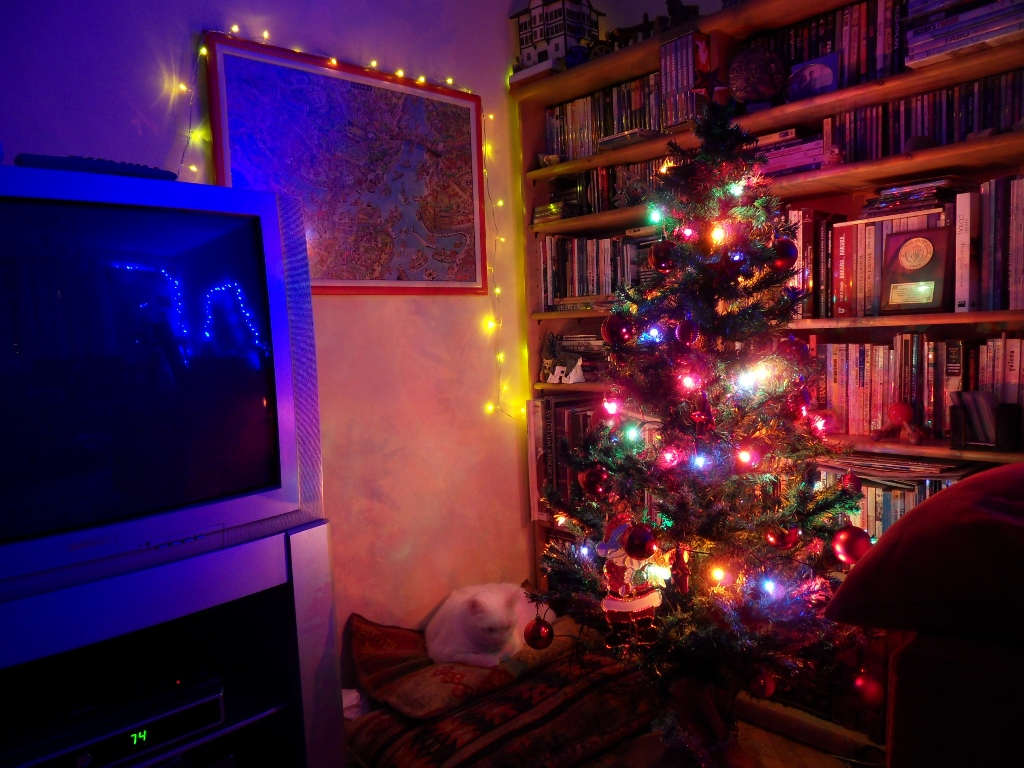
New year's decorations in a Turkish home

A Turkish New Year's tree, in Turkish Yılbaşı Ağacı, looks the same as a Christmas tree with Christmas ornaments. It is called a New Year's tree because it is specific to the New Year and, with about 95% of Turkey's population being Muslim, most Turks do not celebrate Christmas.

During the modernisation of Turkey, the Islamic calendar and the fiscal calendar were replaced by the Gregorian calendar and New Year's celebrations started in the late 1920s. The celebrations became popular in Turkey. The Christians in Turkey already set up Christmas trees and the latter started to be sold as New Year's trees too. Since then, the custom of setting up a tree for the New Year is a traditional event throughout Turkey. It is usually put up between the beginning of December and the end of January, the mid date being New Year's Eve. Also, the habit of giving presents at Christmas was changed to the giving of New Year's presents. The New Year's tree can be considered an example of westernised Turkish culture or Turkified European culture.

In 2024, when students of the Yıldız Technical University in Istanbul tried to decorate a tree, Islamically motivated protesters tried to prevent it, saying that it had no place in Turkey. Afterwards, they also held a prayer in front of the tree, but the students still managed to decorate it.

== Vietnamese and Cantonese custom ==
Vietnamese New Year's tree
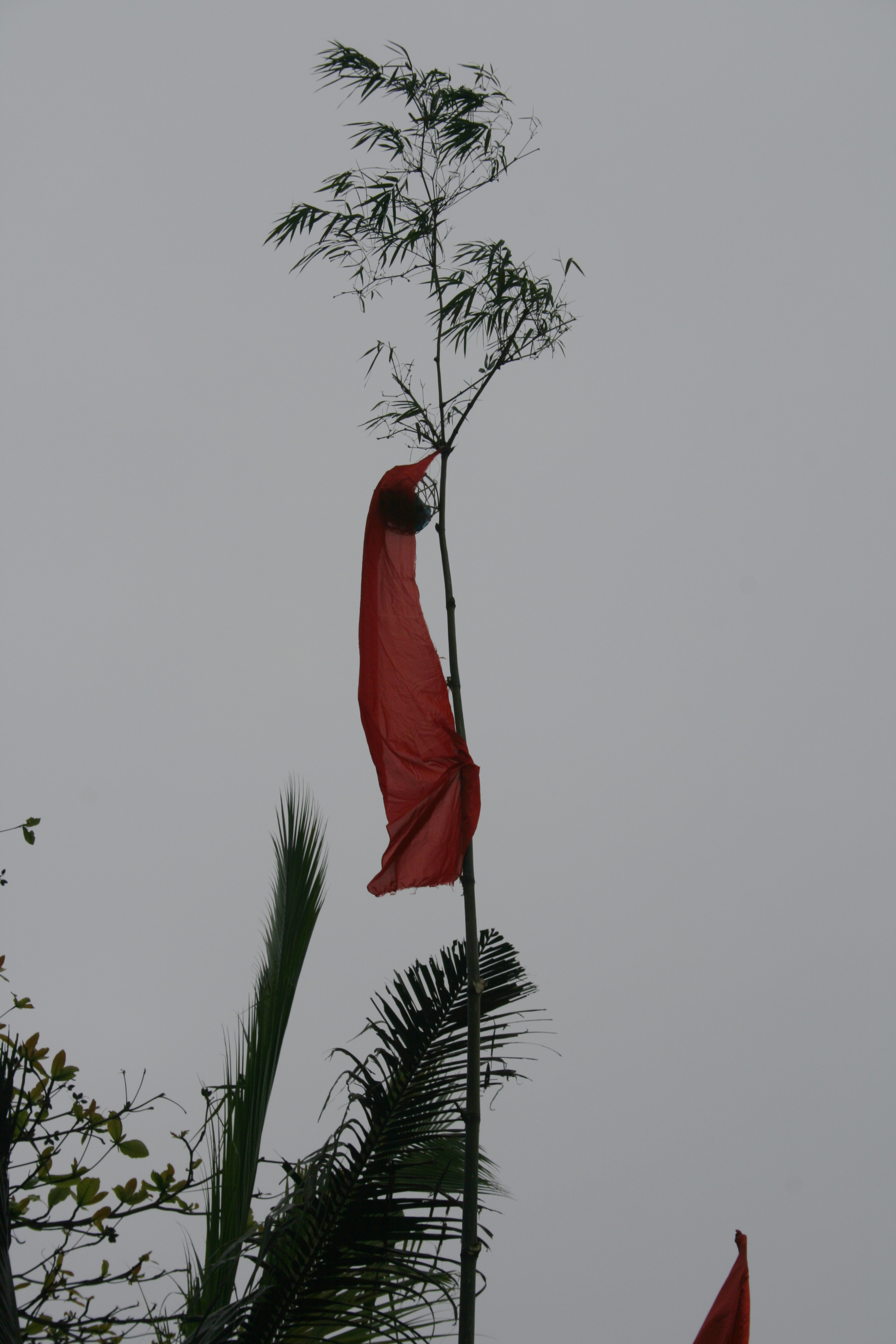
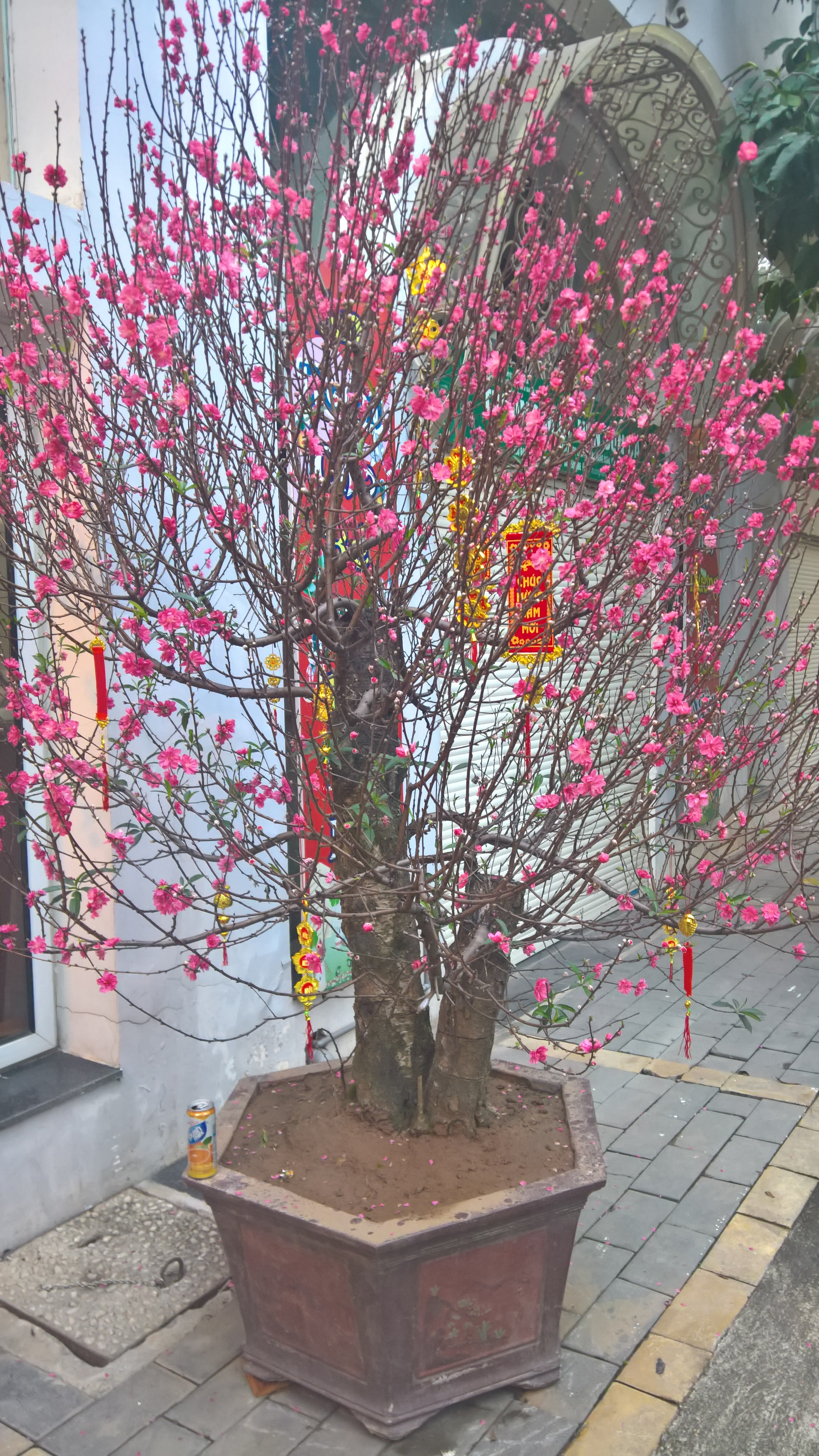
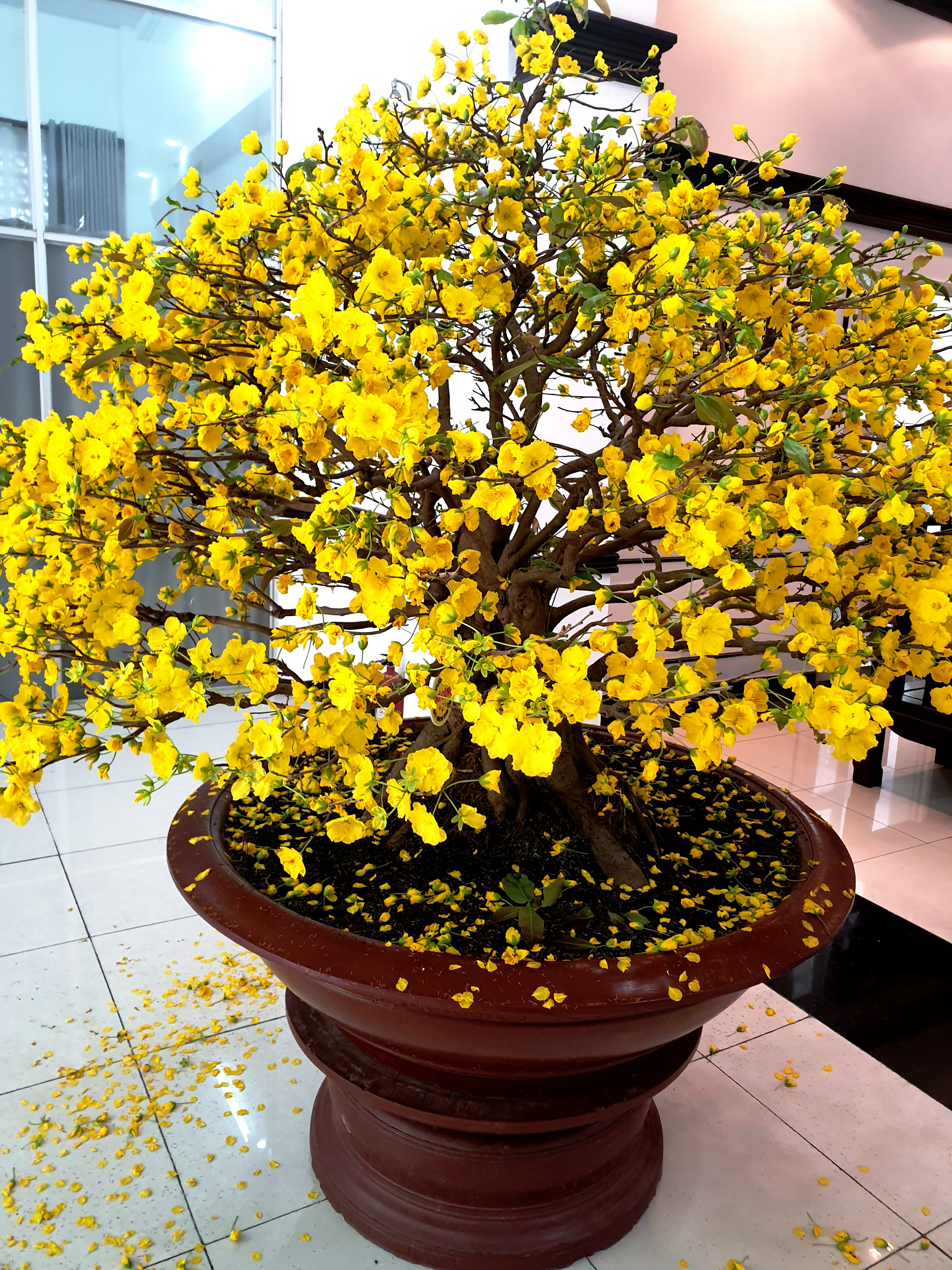
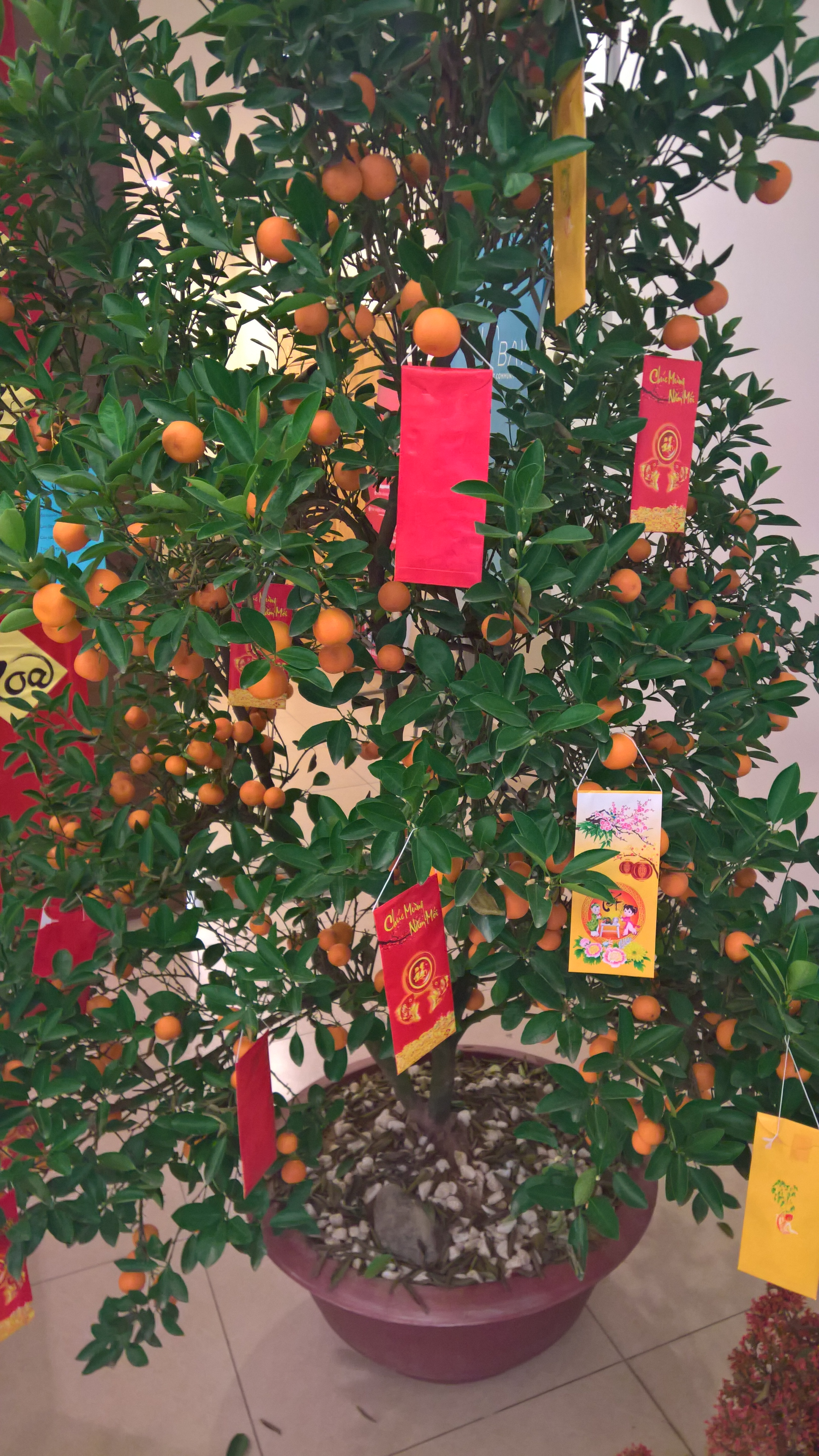
From left to right: Cây nêu, Peach, Ochna integerrima and Calamansi

Planting a Cây nêu (Vietnamese New Year's tree) is a Vietnamese custom that is part of the springtime Tết Nguyên Đán. Often a bamboo pole serves as the "tree".

Hoa đào (in Northern) or Hoa mai (in Southern) and Quất trees are also decorated and displayed in Vietnamese homes during Tết.

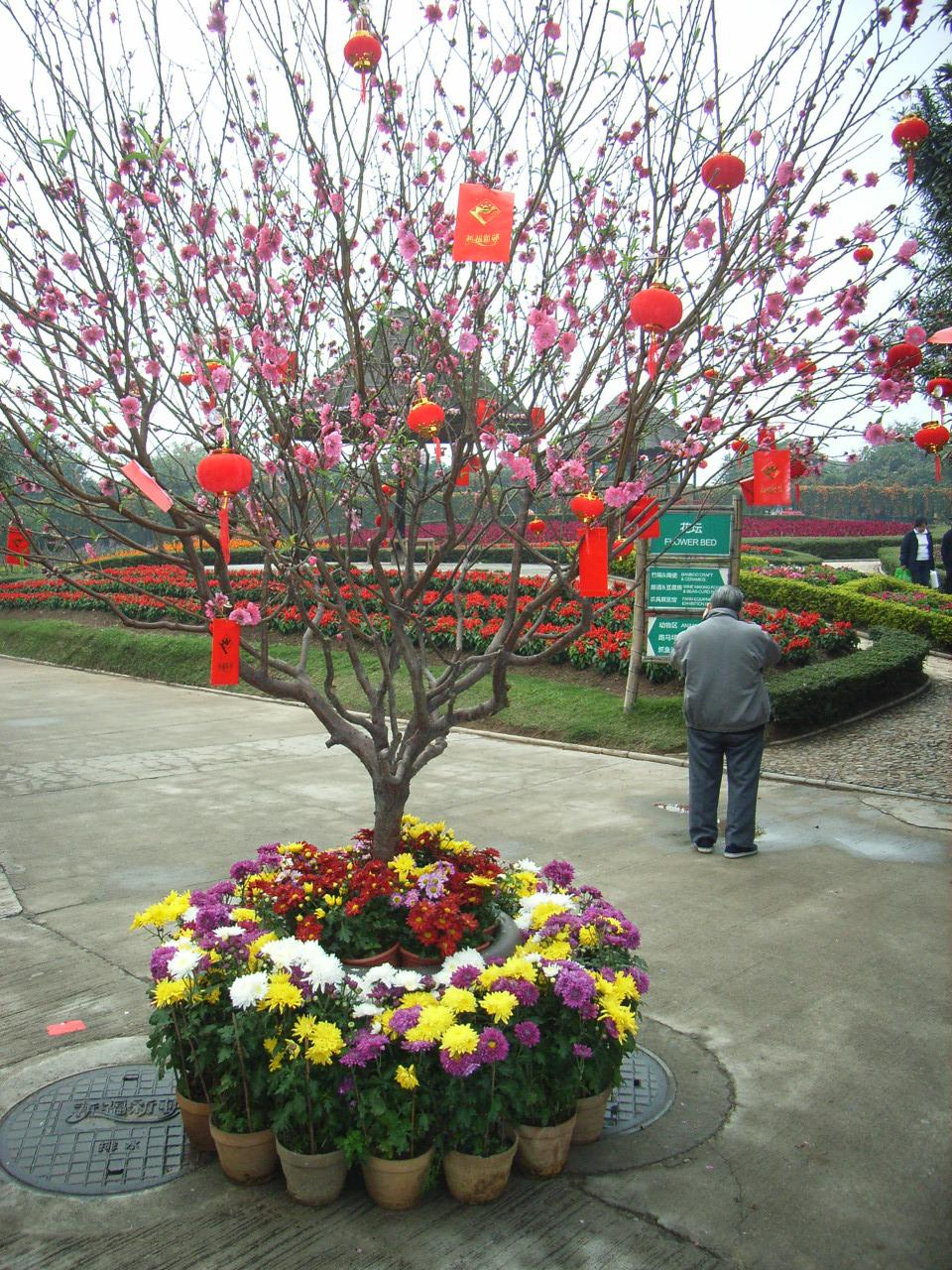
Chinese New Year's tree

In Cantonese, the New Year's tree is called Nin Fa (Chinese: 年花, literally New Year's Flower). Bamboo is just one of the New Year's trees for the Cantonese, the others being mandarin and peach. The mandarin plant is called Kat (Chinese: 桔), which is a homophone to Chinese: 吉, standing for good luck. The peach flower stands for good relationships; love is one of the relationships, so it's also a wish for love.

== See also ==
- Christmas tree
- New Year's Eve
- Novy God
- Hanukkah bush
- Ceremonial pole
- Kadomatsu
- Christmas and the holiday season
