= Kadomatsu =

Traditional Japanese decoration as yorishiro of the New Year

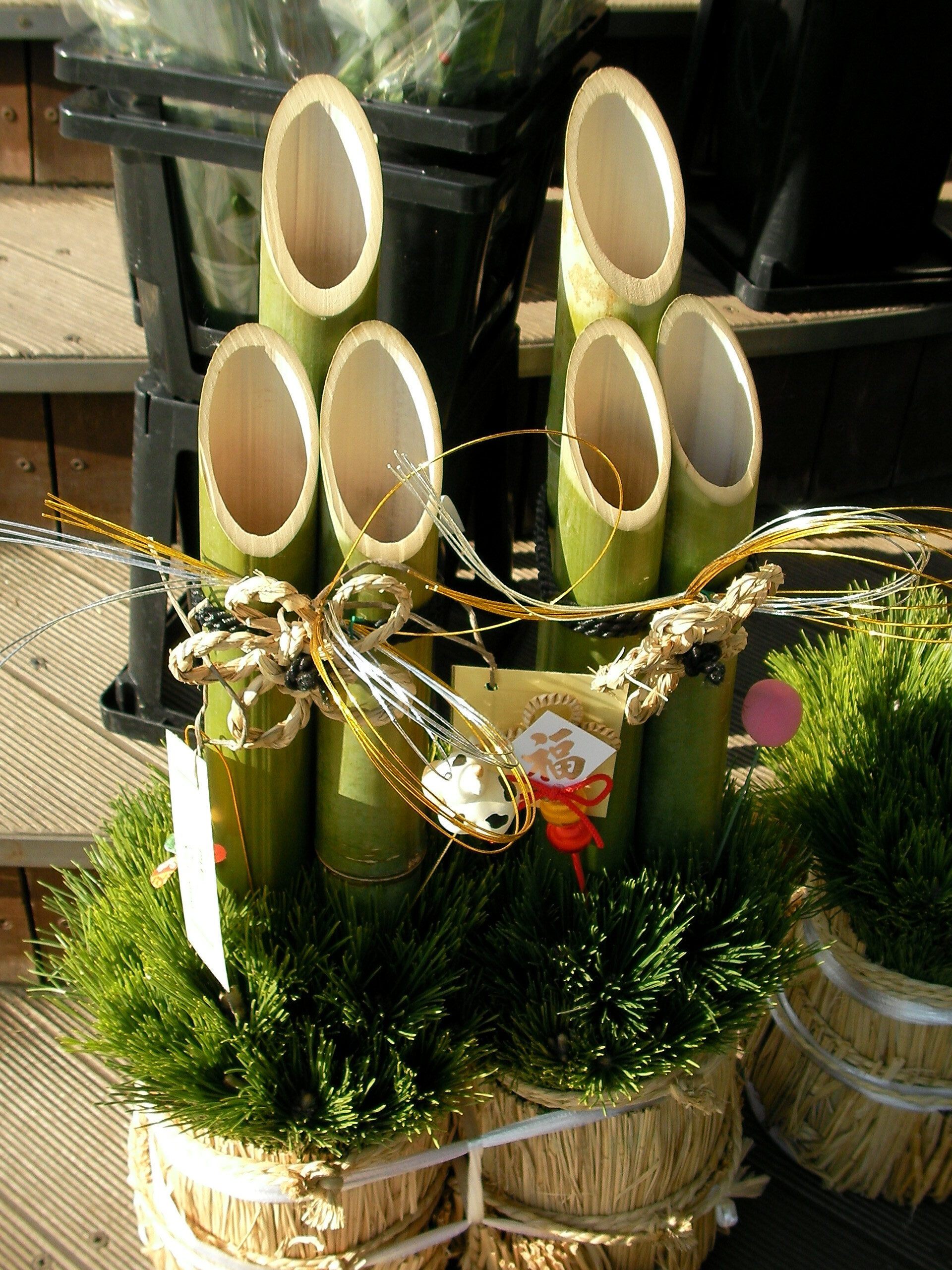
Two kadomatsu made of bamboo

Two kadomatsu at a Shinto shrine in Nagano, 2023

Kadomatsu (門松; "gate pine") are traditional Japanese decorations made for the New Year. They are a type of yorishiro, or objects intended to welcome ancestral spirits or kami of the harvest. Kadomatsu are usually placed in pairs in front of homes and buildings.

== Construction and placement ==
Historically, kadomatsu was often made with pine wood, but these days bamboo is more common. The central portion of the kadomatsu is formed from three large bamboos, though plastic kadomatsu are available. After binding all the elements of the kadomatsu, it is bound with a straw mat and newly woven straw rope. Kadomatsu are placed in pairs on either side of the gate, representing male and female.

== Usage ==
In modern times, kadomatsu are placed after Christmas until January 7 (or January 15 during the Edo period) and are considered temporary housing (shintai) for kami. Designs for kadomatsu vary depending on region but are typically made of pine, bamboo, and sometimes ume tree sprigs which represent longevity, prosperity and steadfastness, respectively. "The fundamental function of the New Year ceremonies is to honor and receive the toshigami (deity), who will then bring a bountiful harvest for farmers and bestow the ancestors' blessing on everyone." After January 15 (or in many instances the 19th) the kadomatsu is burned to appease the kami or toshigami and release them.

== Other information ==
The kadomatsu is included in Unicode as the emoji U+1F38D 🎍 PINE DECORATION.

== Gallery ==
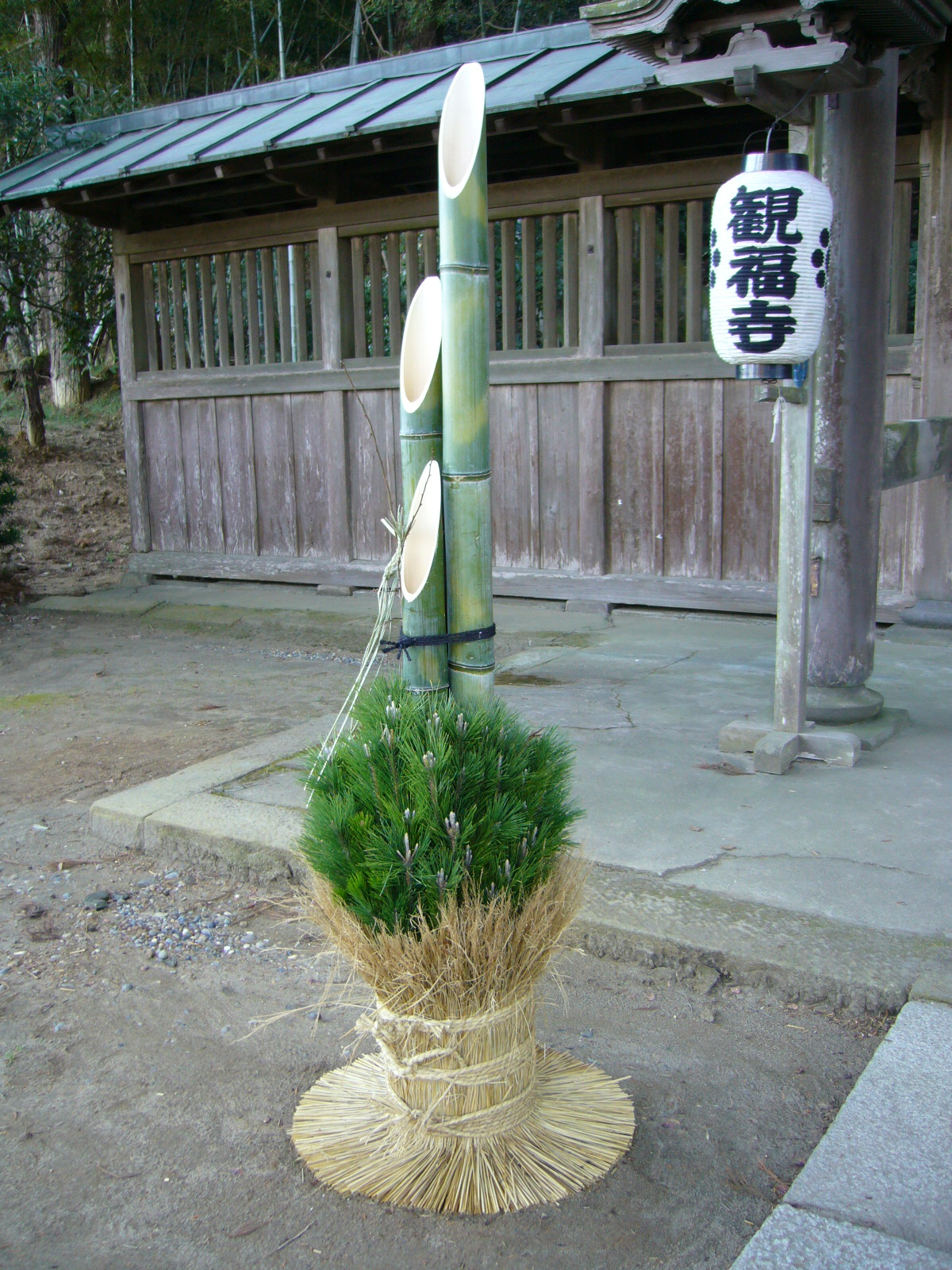
Kadomatsu of East Japan (Kantō region)

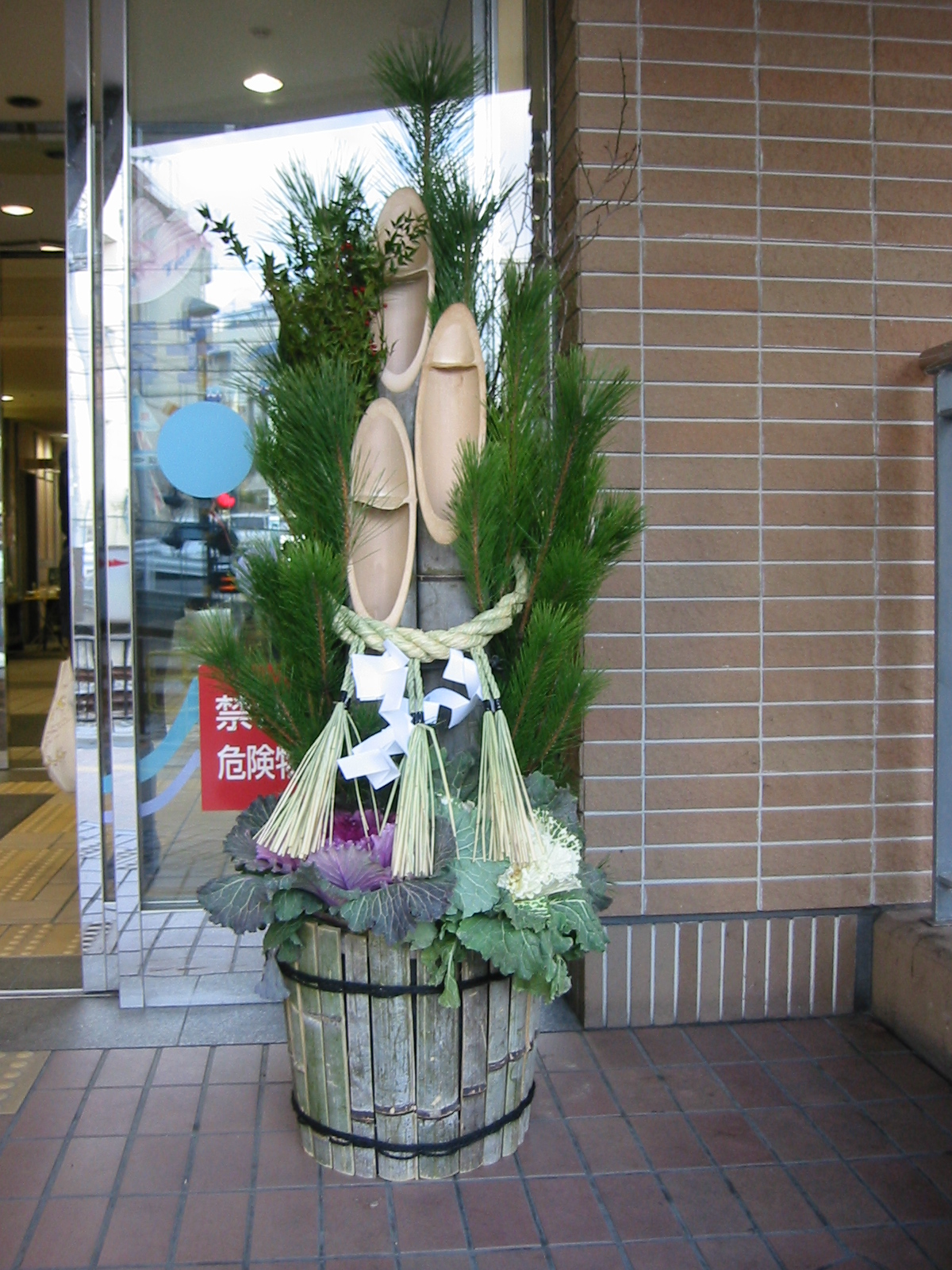
Kadomatsu of West Japan (Kansai region)

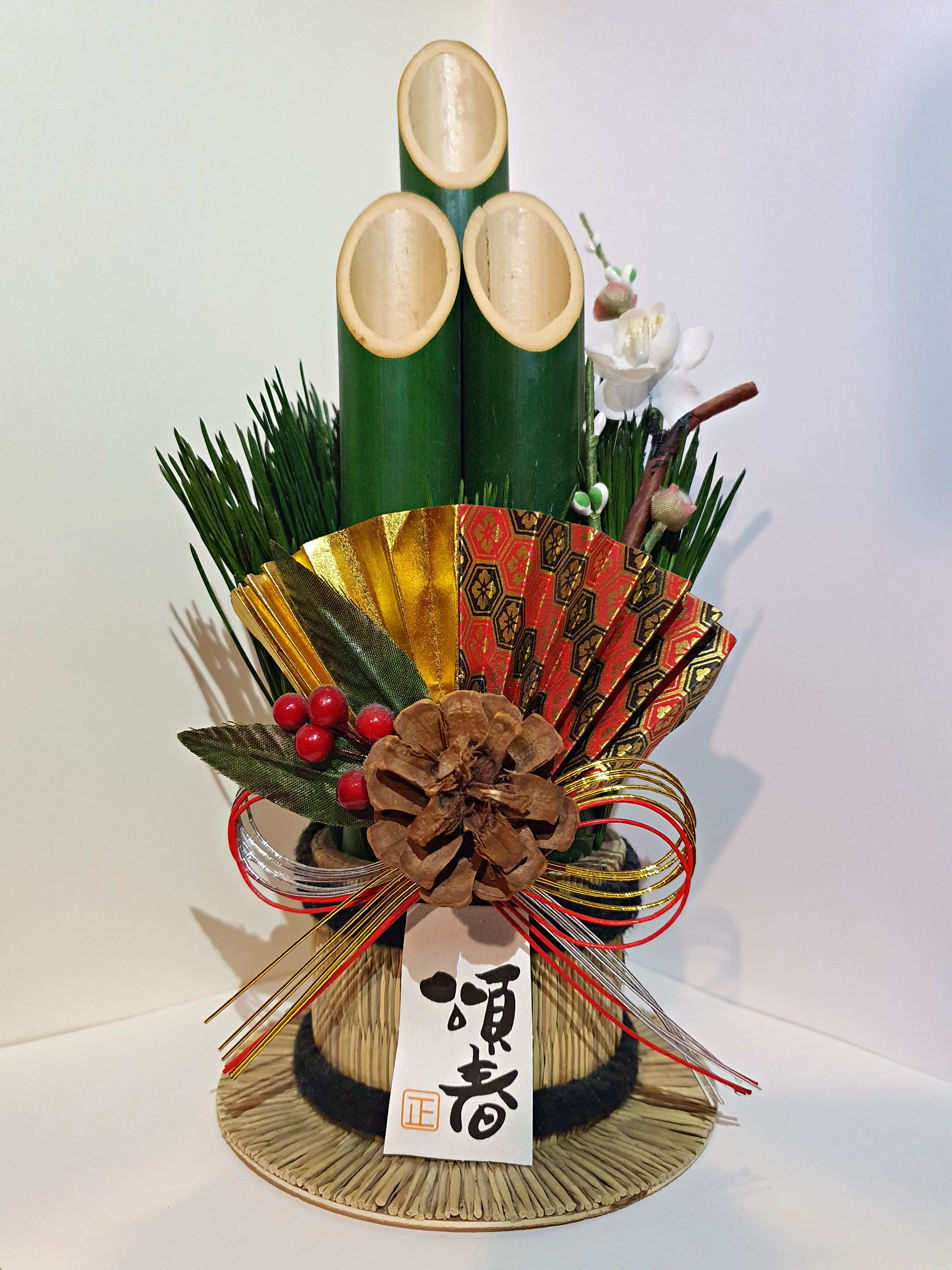
A small kadomatsu

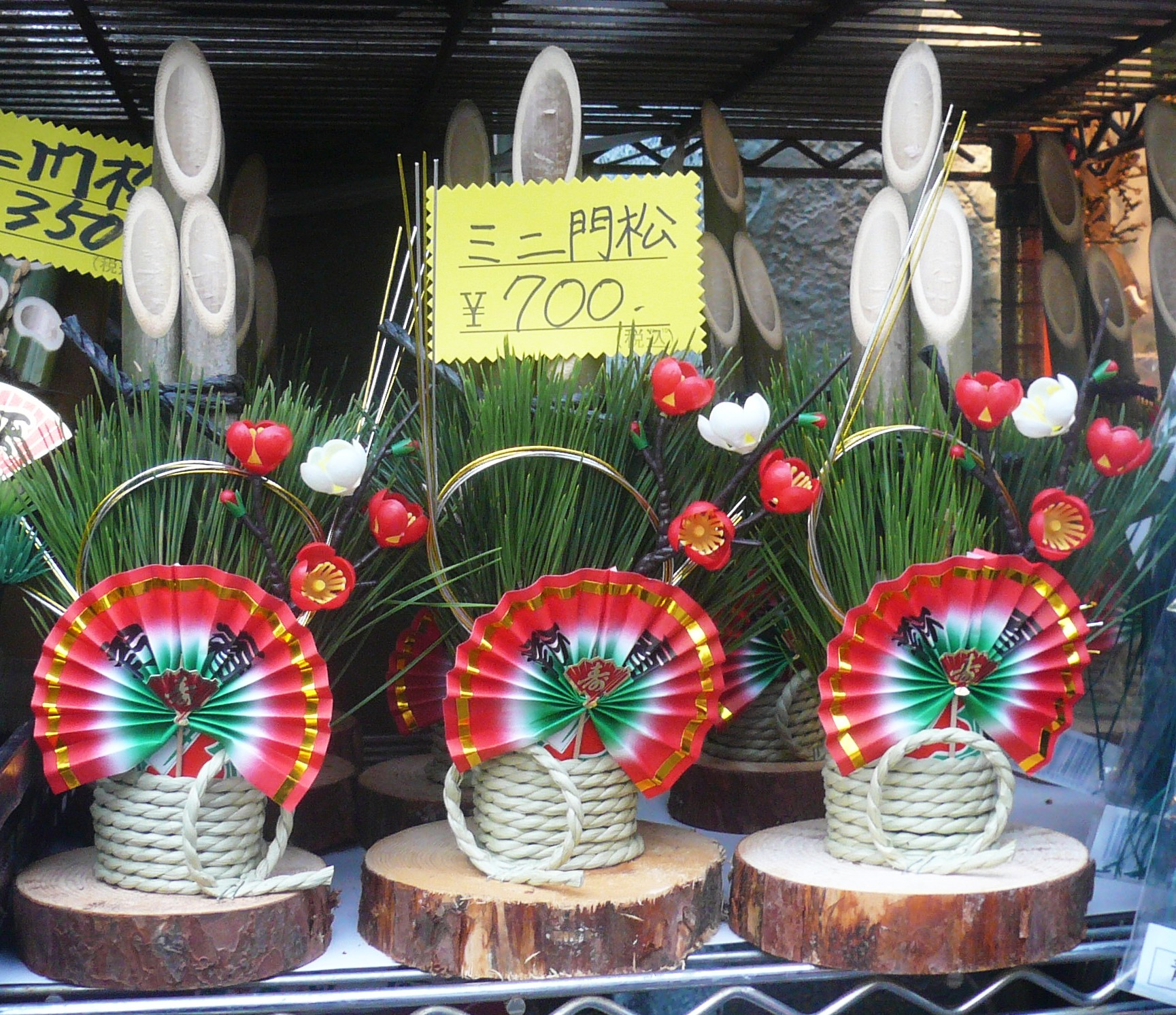
Three miniature kadomatsu being sold outside for 700 Yen each

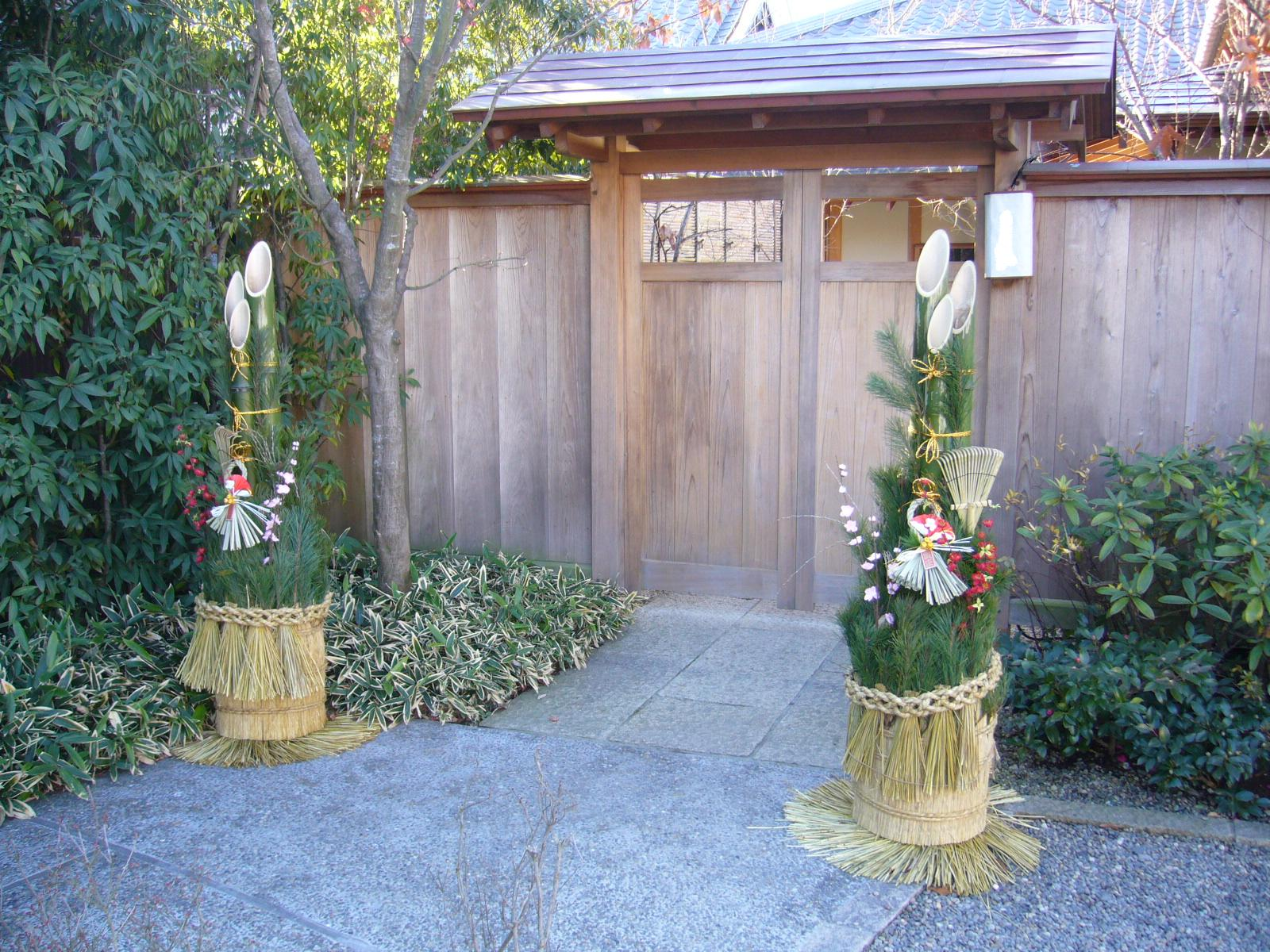
Kadomatsu

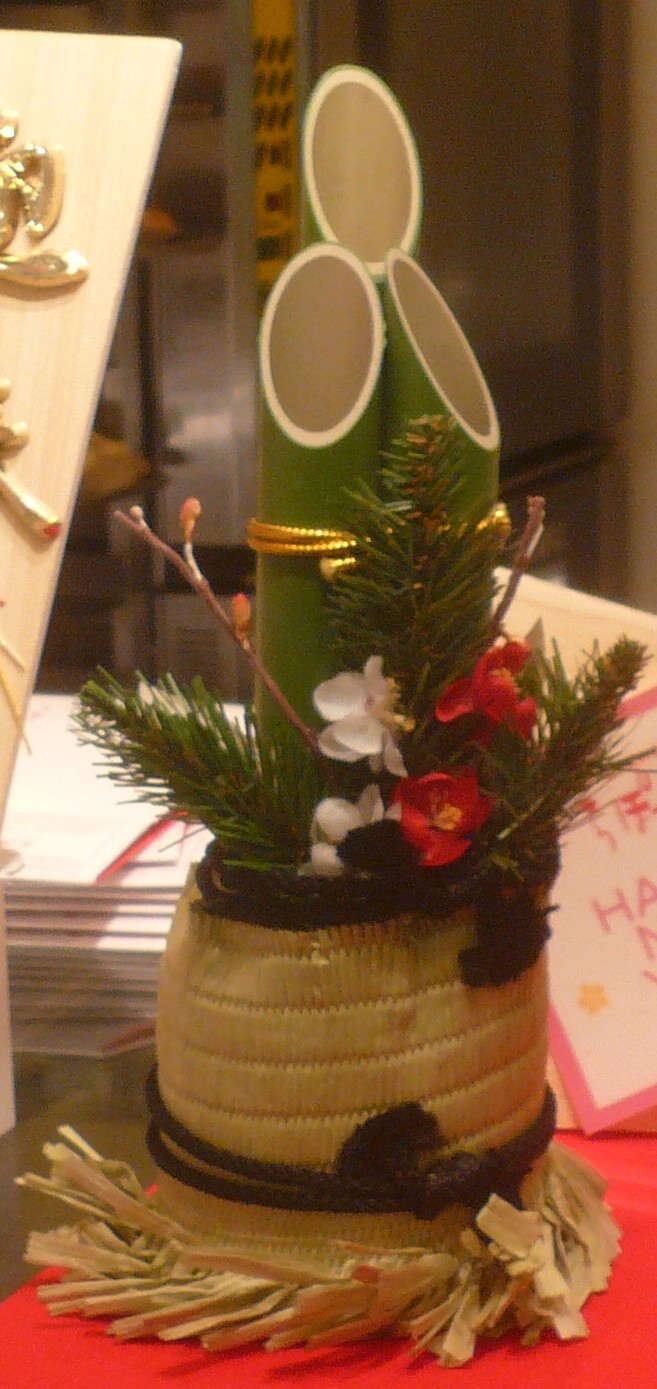
A small kadomatsu in a store

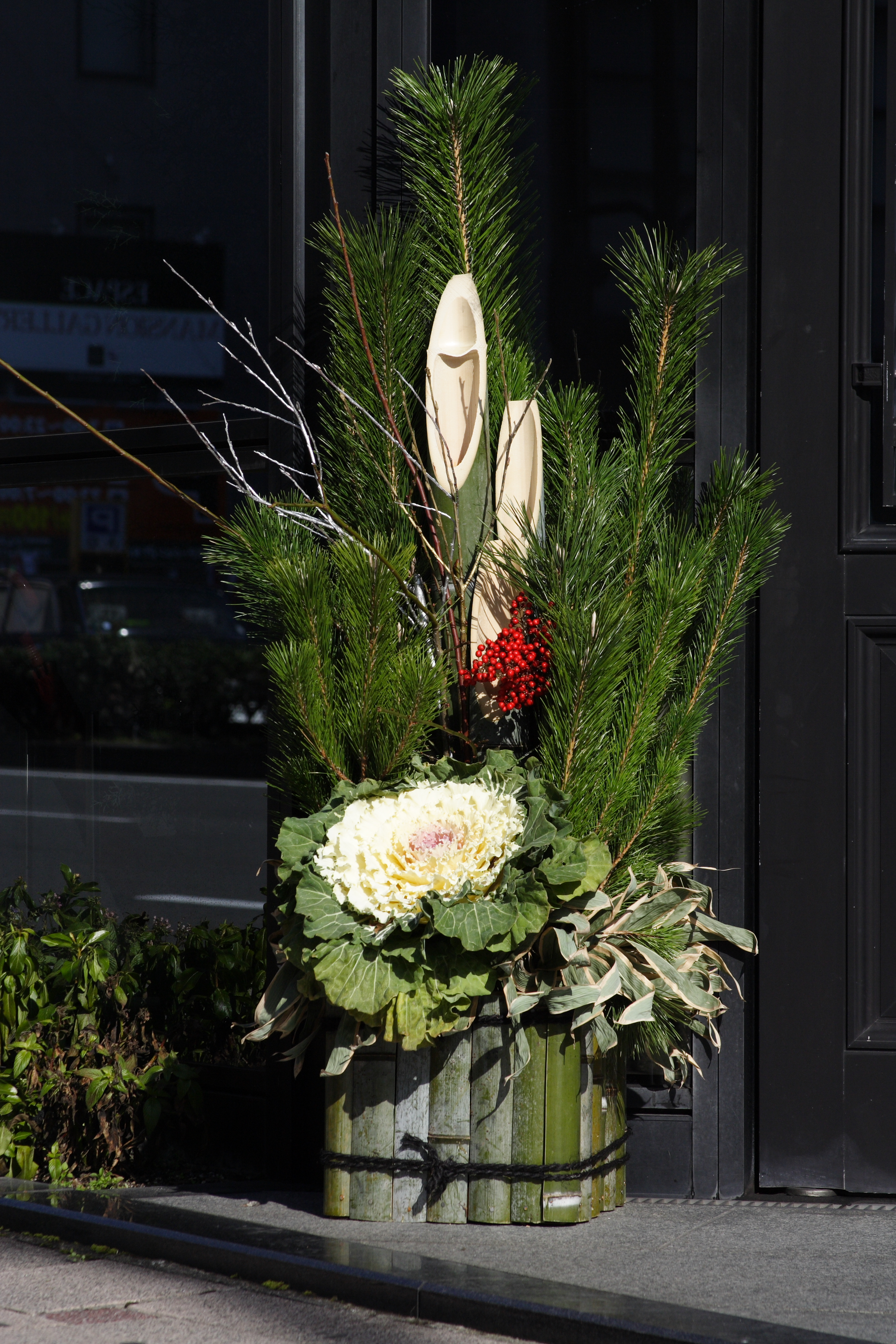
A kadomatsu in Kyoto style

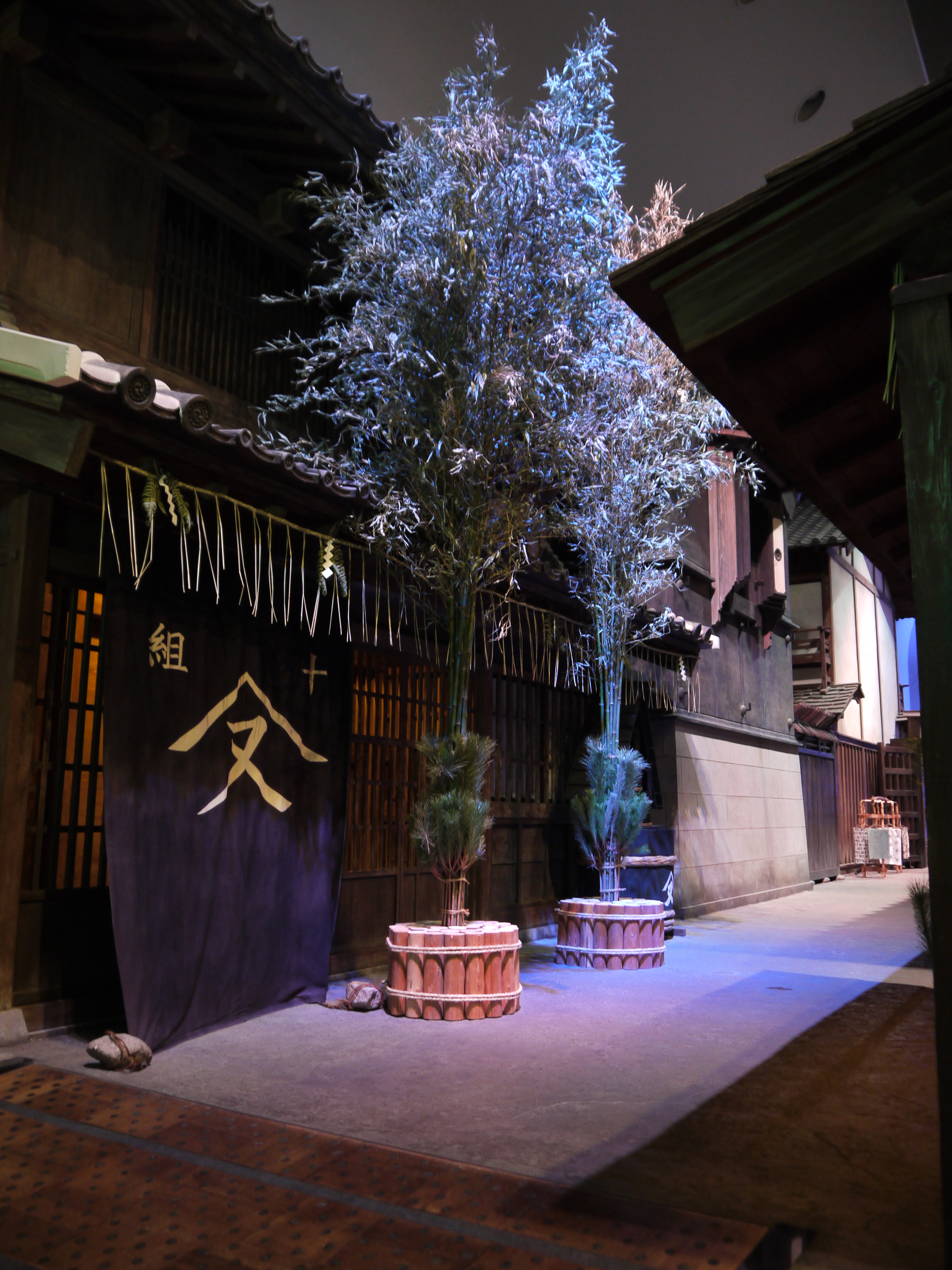
Kadomatsu in the style of the Edo period

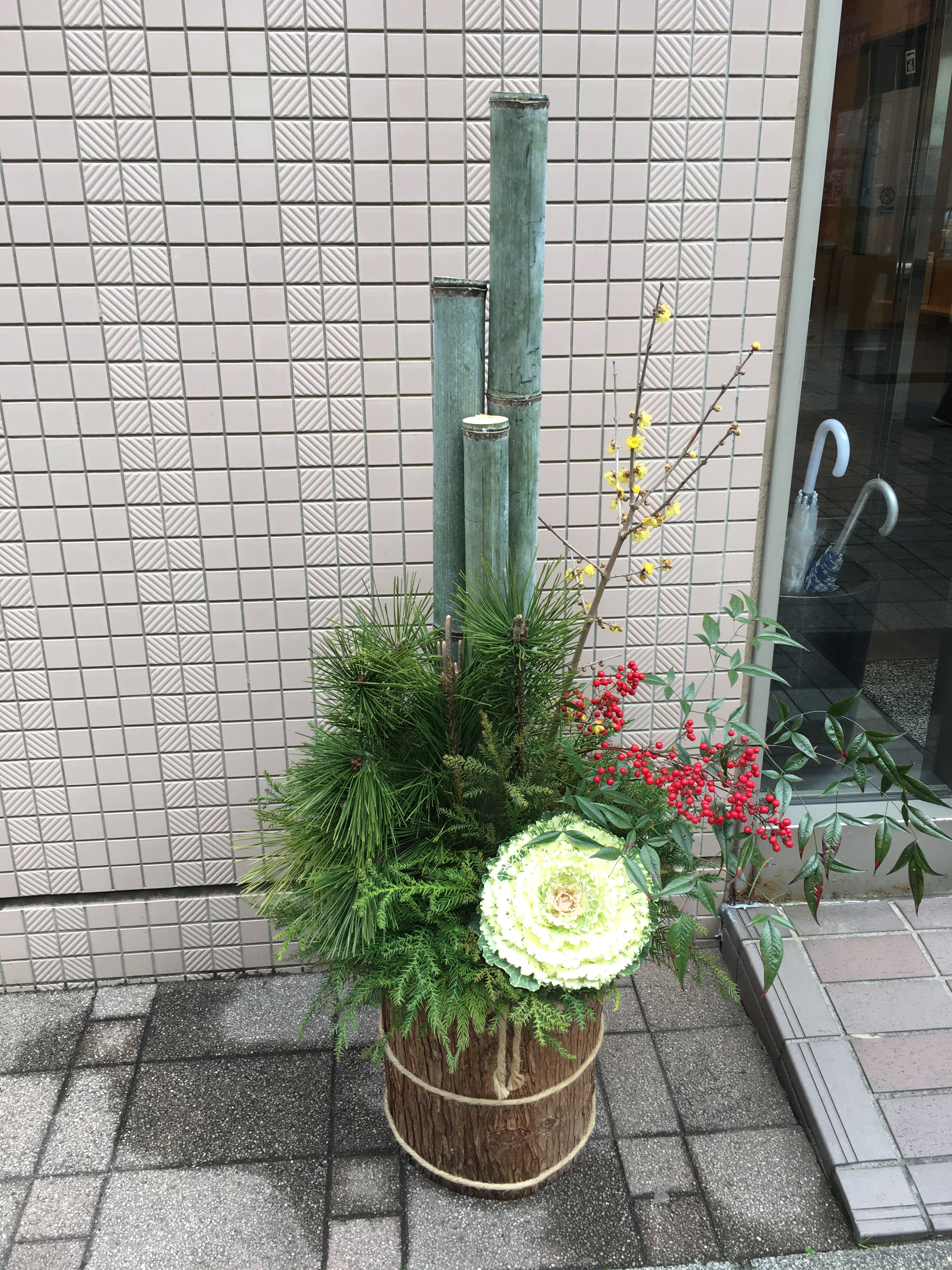
A flat topped kadomatsu in Shimane

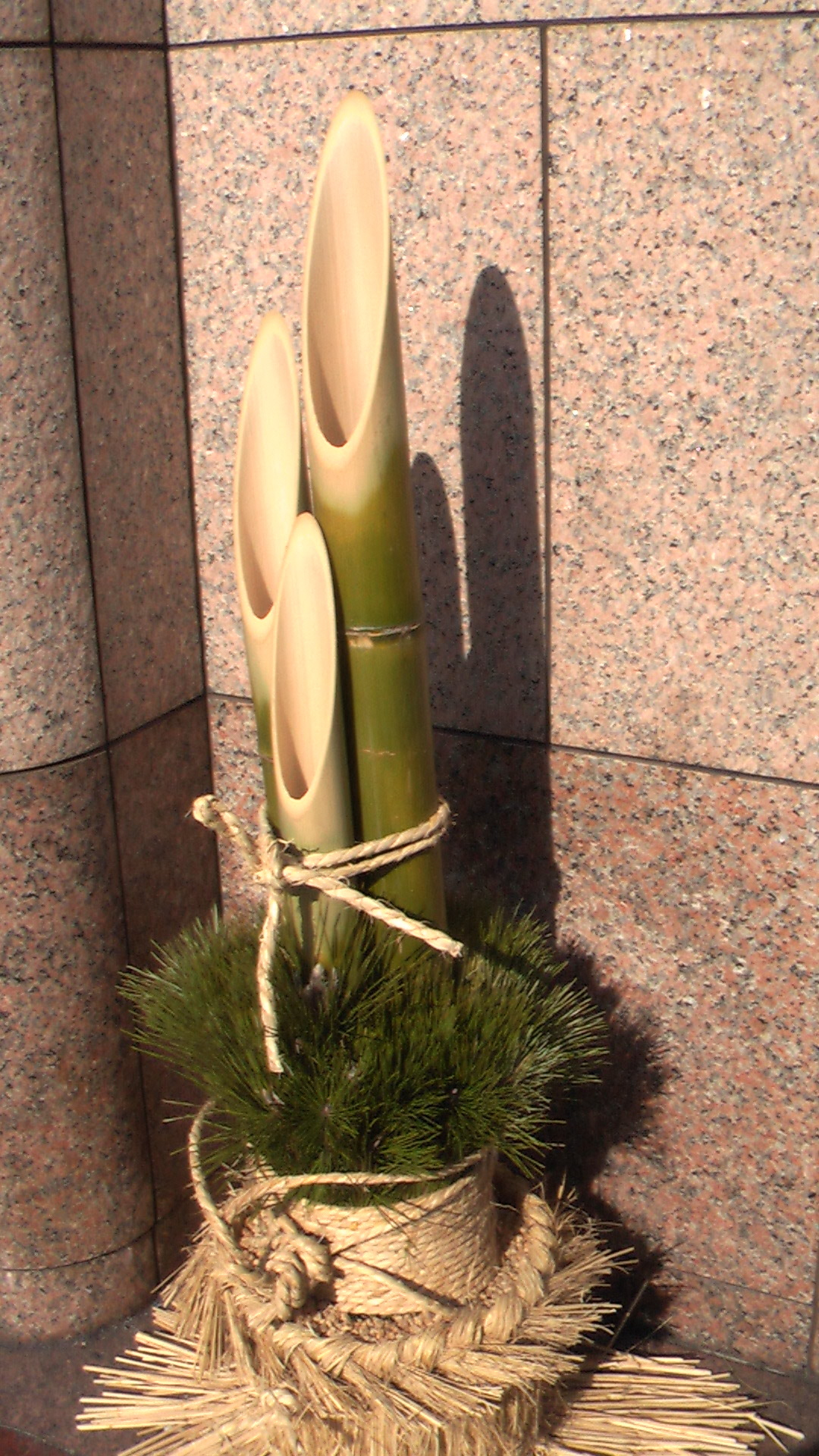
Kadomatsu in Kamakura

== See also ==
- Christmas tree
- Christmas wreath
- Corn dolly
- Mistletoe
- New Year tree
- Three Friends of Winter
- Trees in mythology
