= Steamed rice roll =

Steamed rice roll may refer to:

- Bánh cuốn, a Vietnamese dish
- Rice noodle roll, a Cantonese dish
