= Rice noodle roll =

Cantonese rice dish

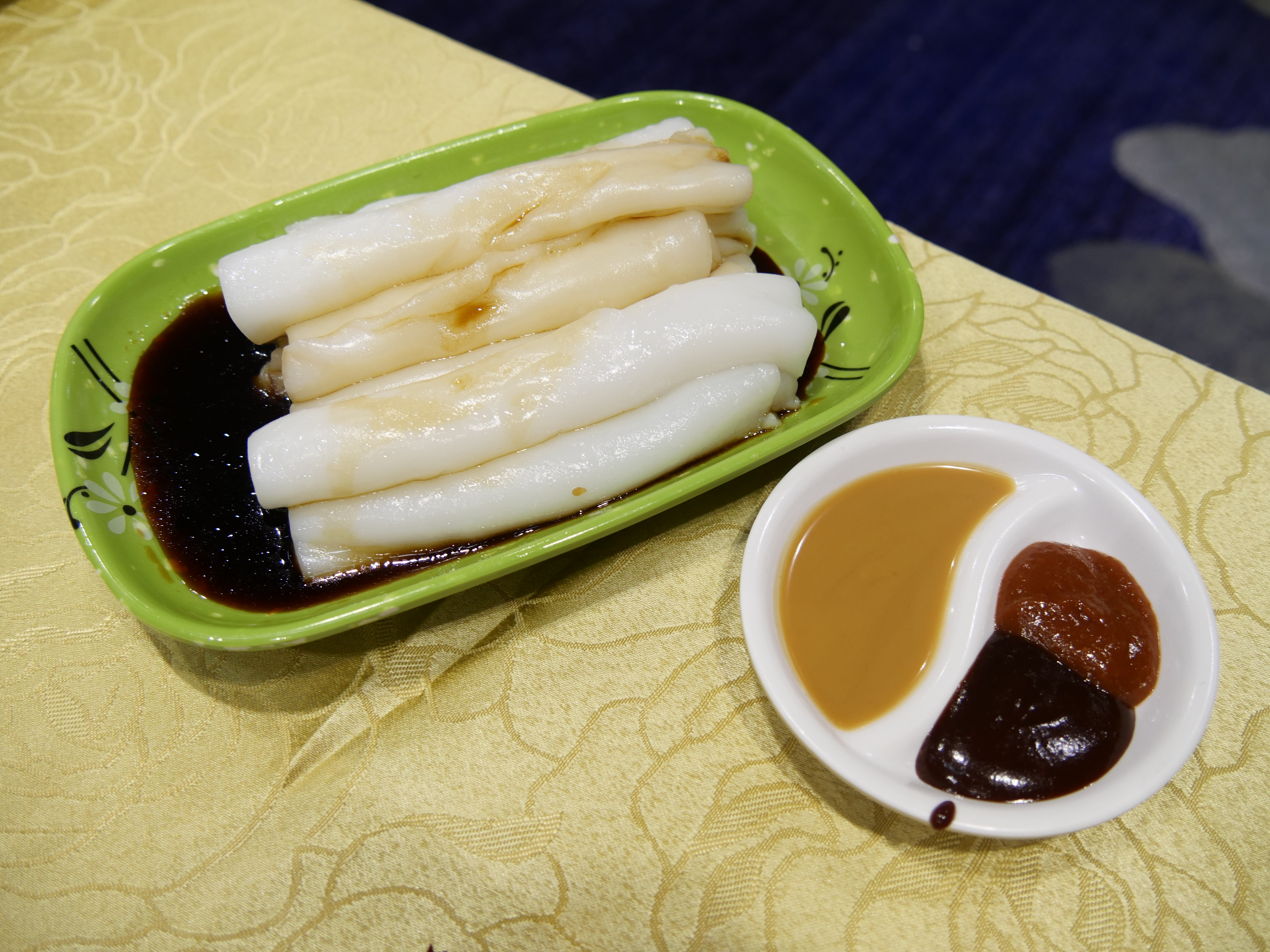
- Plain cheung fun with sauces
- Alternative names: Steamed rice roll, cheung fun
- Course: Dim sum
- Place of origin: China
- Region or state: Guangdong
- Main ingredients: Rice noodles
- Variations: Shrimp, pork, beef, or vegetable filling; youtiao

Rice noodle roll

Chinese name
- Traditional Chinese: 腸粉
- Simplified Chinese: 肠粉
- Literal meaning: intestine noodle
Transcriptions
Standard Mandarin
- Hanyu Pinyin: chángfěn
- IPA: [ʈʂʰǎŋ.fə̀n]
Yue: Cantonese
- Yale Romanization: chéungfán
- Jyutping: coeng^{2} fan^{2}
- IPA: [tsʰœŋ˧˥.fɐn˧˥]

Alternative Chinese name
- Traditional Chinese: 豬腸粉
- Simplified Chinese: 猪肠粉
- Literal meaning: pig intestine noodle
Transcriptions
Standard Mandarin
- Hanyu Pinyin: zhūchángfěn
- IPA: [ʈʂú.ʈʂʰǎŋ.fə̀n]
Yue: Cantonese
- Yale Romanization: jyūchèungfán
- Jyutping: zyu^{1} coeng^{4} fan^{2}
- IPA: [tsy˥.tsʰœŋ˩.fɐn˧˥]

Thai name
- Thai: ก๋วยเตี๋ยวหลอด [kǔa̯j.tǐa̯w lɔ̀ːt]
- RTGS: kuaitiao lot

Rice noodle rolls, also known as steamed rice rolls, cheung fun (Chinese: 腸粉), and as look funn or look fun in Hawaii, is a Cantonese dish originating from Guangdong Province in southern China. It is commonly served as either a snack, small meal or variety of dim sum. It is a thin roll made from a wide strip of shahe fen (rice noodles), filled with shrimp, beef, vegetables, or other ingredients. Seasoned soy sauce – sometimes with siu mei drippings – is poured over the dish upon serving. When plain and made without filling, the rice noodle is also known as jyu cheung fun or chee cheong fun (豬腸粉), literally "pork sausage noodle, pork intestine noodle", a reference to its resemblance to a pig's intestines. There is no official recording of the history of rice noodle rolls; most cookbooks claim that it was first made in the 1930s. In Guangzhou, Guangdong Province, people called the dish laai cheung (拉腸 lit. 'pull intestines') because it is a noodle roll that is pulled by hand.

== History ==
Rice noodle rolls are believed to have originated in Guangdong province in southern China, where they became associated with breakfast culture and Cantonese dim sum traditions. The dish developed alongside the broader use of steamed rice batter sheets in southern Chinese cuisine, a technique made possible by the region’s long history of rice cultivation and wet-rice agriculture. Over time, rice noodle rolls became a common street food in cities such as Guangzhou, where vendors prepared them fresh to order using portable steaming equipment.

By the 20th century, rice noodle rolls had become firmly integrated into Cantonese dim sum culture and were widely served in teahouses throughout Guangdong and Hong Kong. The dish’s smooth texture and versatility allowed for a variety of fillings, including shrimp, beef, and barbecued pork, as well as simpler versions served plain with soy sauce. A related preparation, zhaliang, which wraps the rice noodle sheet around fried dough sticks, also became popular as part of Cantonese breakfast cuisine.

Similar steamed rice sheet dishes developed in other parts of Southeast Asia, reflecting cultural exchange and migration from southern China. One notable example is Vietnamese bánh cuốn, which uses thin steamed rice sheets filled with seasoned pork and mushrooms. Variants also appear in Malaysia and Singapore, where the dish is known as chee cheong fun and is often served with sweet sauces or curry. Today, rice noodle rolls remain a staple of Cantonese cuisine and are widely consumed both in traditional dim sum restaurants and as street food across Chinese diaspora communities worldwide.

== Preparation ==
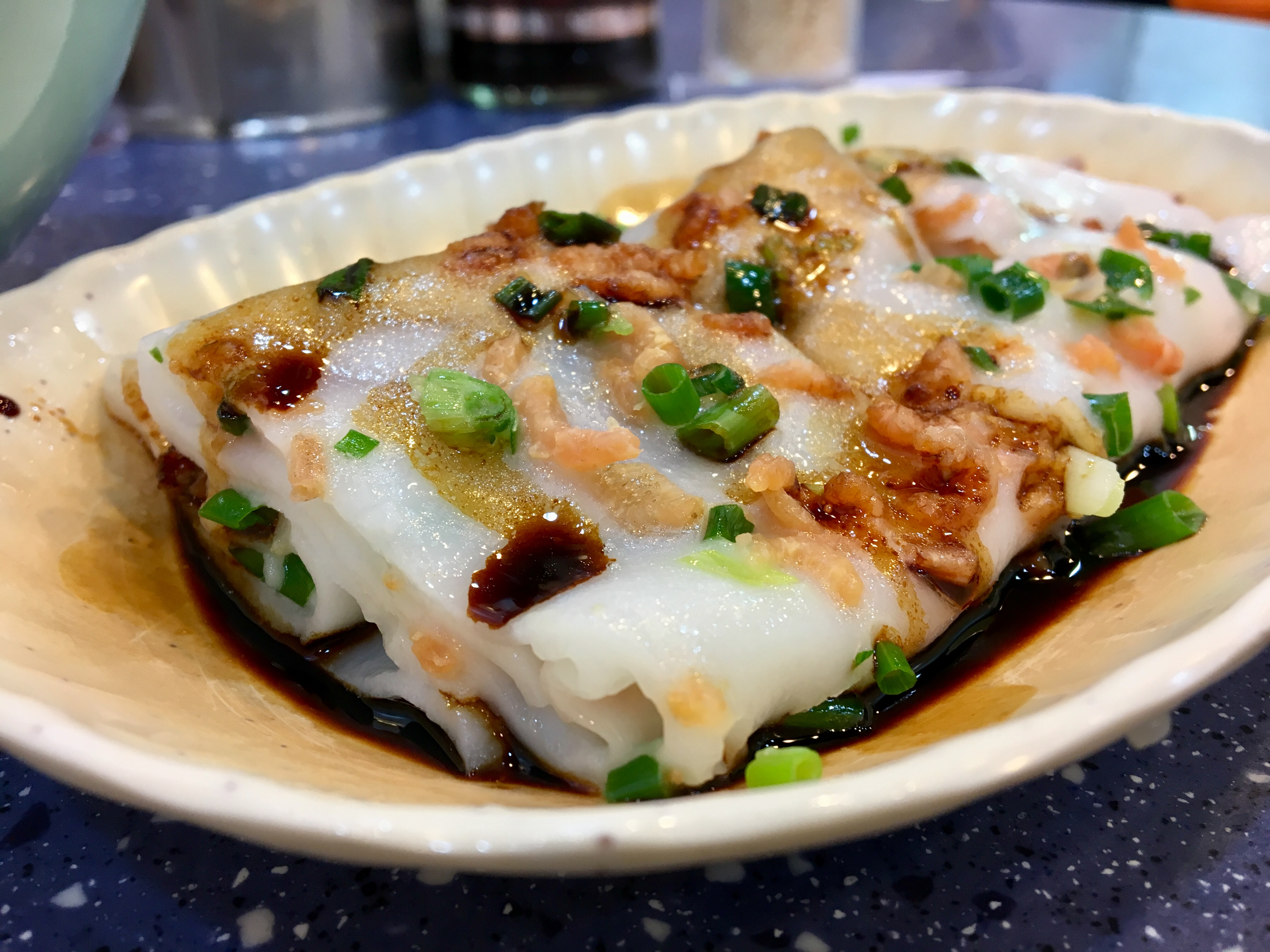
With dried shrimp and spring onions

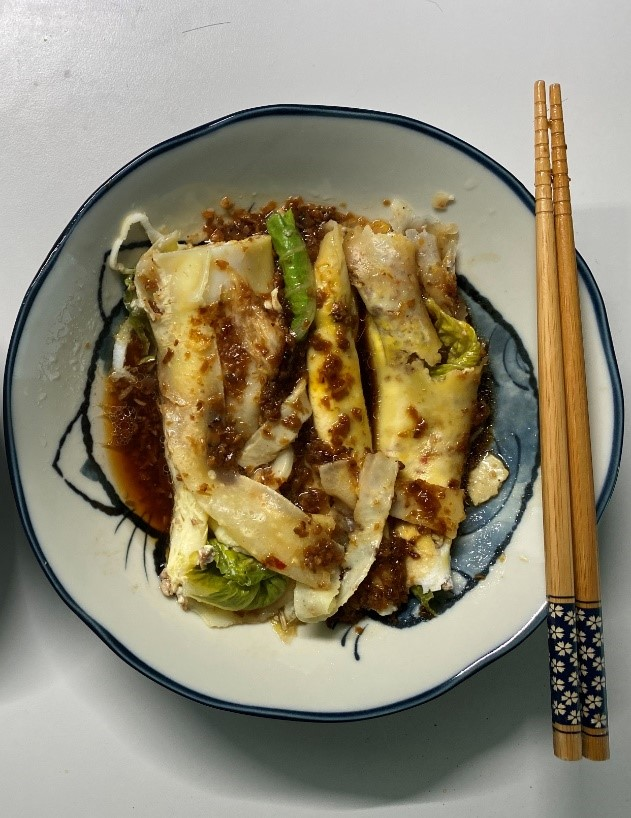
Guangdong-style rice noodle roll

The rice noodle sheets are made from a mixture of rice flour and tapioca or glutinous rice flour and water. The mixture has the consistency of heavy cream. The rice flour provides bulk and flavor, while the tapioca flour gives the noodle elasticity and springiness. The tapioca or glutinous rice flour may be omitted when using rice flour made from certain kinds of aged rice, as chemical changes in the aged rice produce the same texture as the addition of the second starch.

This liquid mixture is poured into a specially made flat pan with holes (similar to a flat colander). Commercial restaurants instead use special oversized steamers that are lined with a steam-permeable cloth. The noodle mixture is steamed in the pan from the bottom up to produce the square rice noodle sheets. The noodles are typically very thin (roughly 1/8 thickness).

Once the liquid mixture is ladled and set, fillings such as shrimp or beef may be added before the noodle is fully cooked. As the noodle is cooking, it will start to set around the filling and take hold without falling out when transferring from steamer to dish. After steaming for several minutes the freshly steamed noodle sticks to the cloth and must be scraped off, usually onto a metal surface with a thin coat of oil to prevent sticking. The resulting noodle is lightly folded about three times. Traditionally, the noodles are finished with the addition of a warm, sweetened soy sauce just before serving. Cantonese/Hong Kong–style cheung fun is usually lightly folded when there is filling inside.

The actual noodle itself has little flavor, with the fillings and soy sauce that accompanies providing the bulk of the dish's umami flavor. Traditional fillings are marinated fresh or dried shrimp, beef (heavily mixed with rice flour), or pork, and chopped green onions.

The rice noodle roll is generally served in multiples of three and usually scored to reveal the filling inside. Most other countries will roll them plain with no filling inside and instead serve them with toppings and a thick sauce on top. The rice noodle roll is served hot and fresh and accompanied with a splash of plain or flavoured (fried shallot) oil with a generous amount of warm sweet soy sauce added right before serving. Most establishments will have a slightly different flavor of sweet soy sauce such as an addition of hoisin sauce.

== Regional ==
=== Cantonese cuisine ===
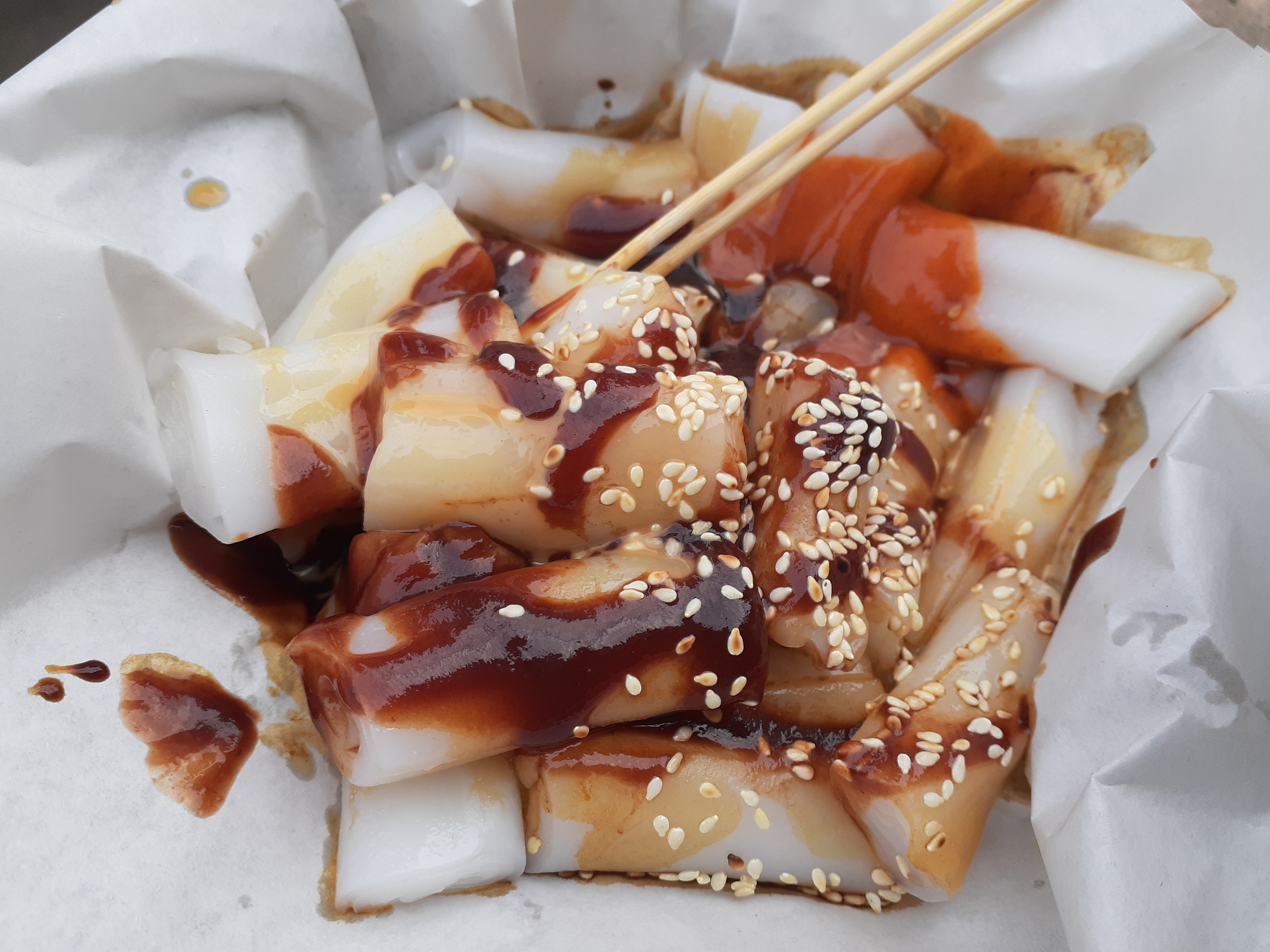
Plain cheung fun with hoisin sauce, peanut sauce, and roasted sesame seeds

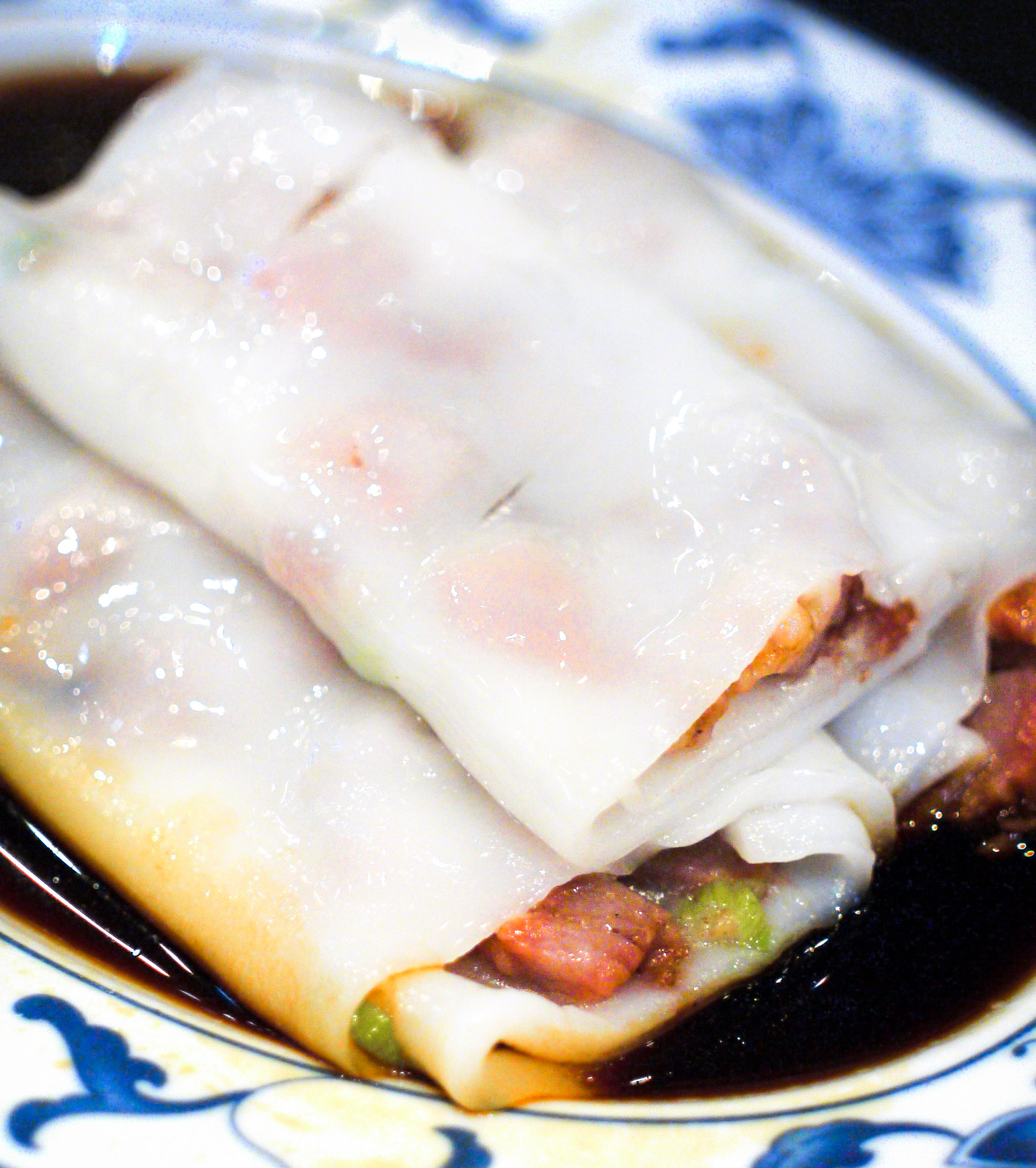
Rice noodle roll with char siu

In Cantonese cuisine, rice noodle rolls are most often served in dim sum. The most common types traditionally offered as part of dim sum cuisine are:

- Beef rice noodle roll (Chinese: 牛肉腸; Cantonese Yale: ngàuyuhk chéung)
- Shrimp rice noodle roll (Chinese: 蝦腸; Cantonese Yale: hā chéung)
- Dried shrimp rice noodle roll (Chinese: 蝦米腸; Cantonese Yale: hā máih chéung)
- Char siu rice noodle roll (Chinese: 叉燒腸; Cantonese Yale: chāsīu chéung)
- Zhaliang (Chinese: 炸兩; Cantonese Yale: ja léung)
- Pan-fried rice rolls (Chinese: 煎腸粉; Cantonese Yale: jīn chéungfán)

Rice noodle roll with chicken and bitter melon

Other modern varieties that may be offered include:

- Rice noodle roll with chicken and bitter melon
- Rice noodle roll with conpoy and pea shoot
- Rice noodle roll with fish
- Stir-fried rice noodle roll with XO sauce

A version of cheung fun notably absent outside of Guangzhou is the sliced meat filling variety. This variety is typically found in streetside restaurants as a meal in itself, and uses whole meat pieces, typically beef or pork, rather than ground meat. Prior to rolling the crepe, briefly blanched lettuce or romaine is added as part of the filling, giving the cheung fun a crunch as well as volume.

=== Chaoshan cuisine ===
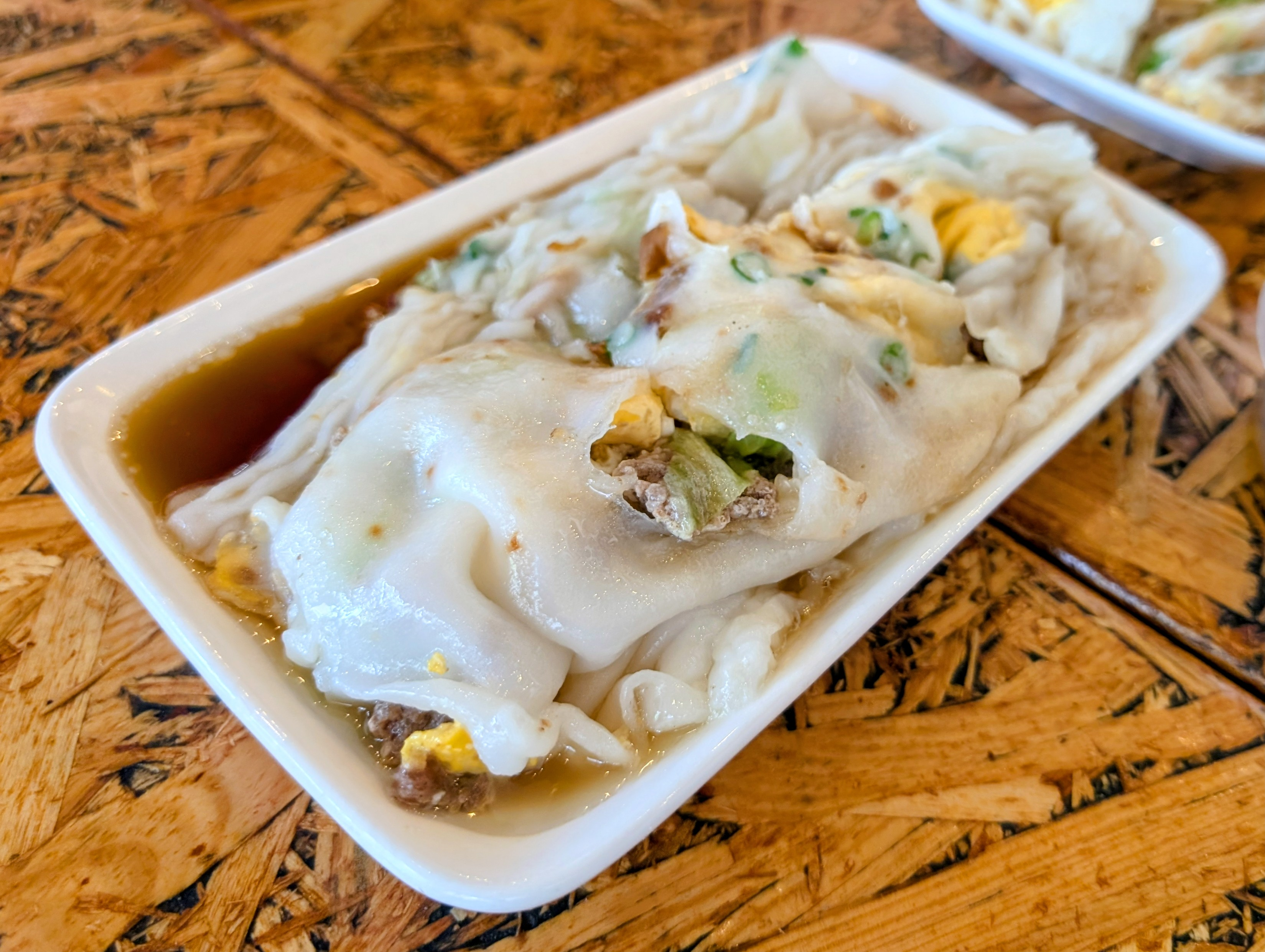
Chaoshan style rice noodle roll with beef filling

While Canton and Hong Kong–style rice rolls emphasize the making of a thin rice sheet, Chaoshan rice roll (Chinese: 潮汕腸粉; Teochew: dio5 suan1 deng5 hung2) puts more emphasis on the sauce and toppings. Because Chaoshan rice rolls have more fillings, the rice sheet must be thicker in order to hold the fillings. Thick rice sheets are not transparent, which makes the Chaoshan rice rolls taste less smooth than the Canton or Hong Kong–style rice rolls.

There are different varieties of Chaoshan rice rolls in different parts of Chaoshan. Amongst them, Puning rice rolls (Chinese: 普寧腸粉; Teochew: Pou2 leng5 deng5 hung2) are the most popular variety of Teochew rice roll. They typically have fresh minced pork, dry mushrooms, dry shrimps and preserved radishes as filling and have fresh beef, shrimp and/or oyster as toppings. Soup or sauce will be poured on before serving.

=== Southeast Asian cuisine ===
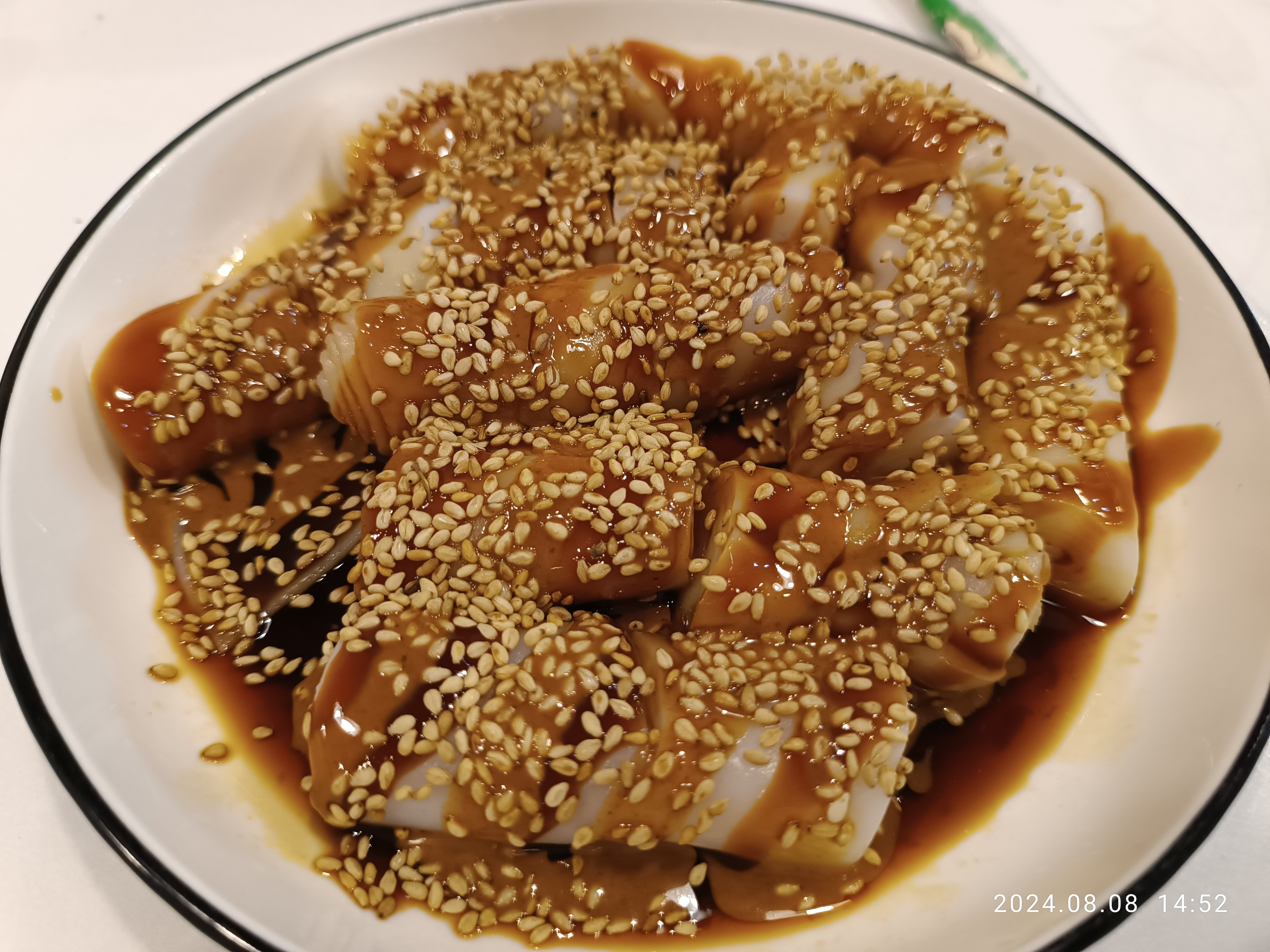
With sesame seeds

The Malaysian Penang style chee cheong fun (Cantonese Chinese: 豬腸粉) is served with a shrimp paste called hae ko （蝦膎） in the Hokkien dialect and petis udang in the Malay language.

In Ipoh, chee cheong fun (豬腸粉) is mainly served in two ways, the dry or wet versions. In the dry version, it is served with bright red sweet sauce and in most cases, chilli sauce as well as pickled green chilli. In the wet version, it is served with curry with pork rind and long bean or minced meat and shiitake mushroom gravy. Both dry or wet versions are topped with sesame seeds and fried shallots.

Teluk Intan, one of the towns in the state of Perak, has other variations of chee cheong fun that contain turnips, shallots and deep-fried shrimp.

Chee cheong fun is a popular breakfast food in Singapore and Malaysia. Chee cheong fun is frequently served in kopitiams and Chinese restaurants. Chee cheong fun can also be found in Bagansiapiapi, a small town in Riau, Indonesia. It is called tee long pan or tee cheong pan in the Hokkien dialect. Tee long pan is served with red chilli sauce, crushed roasted peanuts, fried shallots, and dried shrimp.

=== Vietnamese cuisine ===
In Vietnamese cuisine, there is a similar dish called bánh cuốn, and it is mostly eaten for breakfast. It is a crêpe-like roll made from a thin, wide sheet of rice noodle (similar to shahe fen) that can be filled with ground pork and other ingredients. Side dishes usually consist of chả lụa (Vietnamese pork sausage) and bean sprouts, while the dipping sauce is called nước chấm. Sometimes, a drop of cà cuống, which is the essence of a giant water bug, Lethocerus indicus, is added to the nước chấm for extra flavor, although this ingredient is scarce and quite expensive.

== Gallery ==
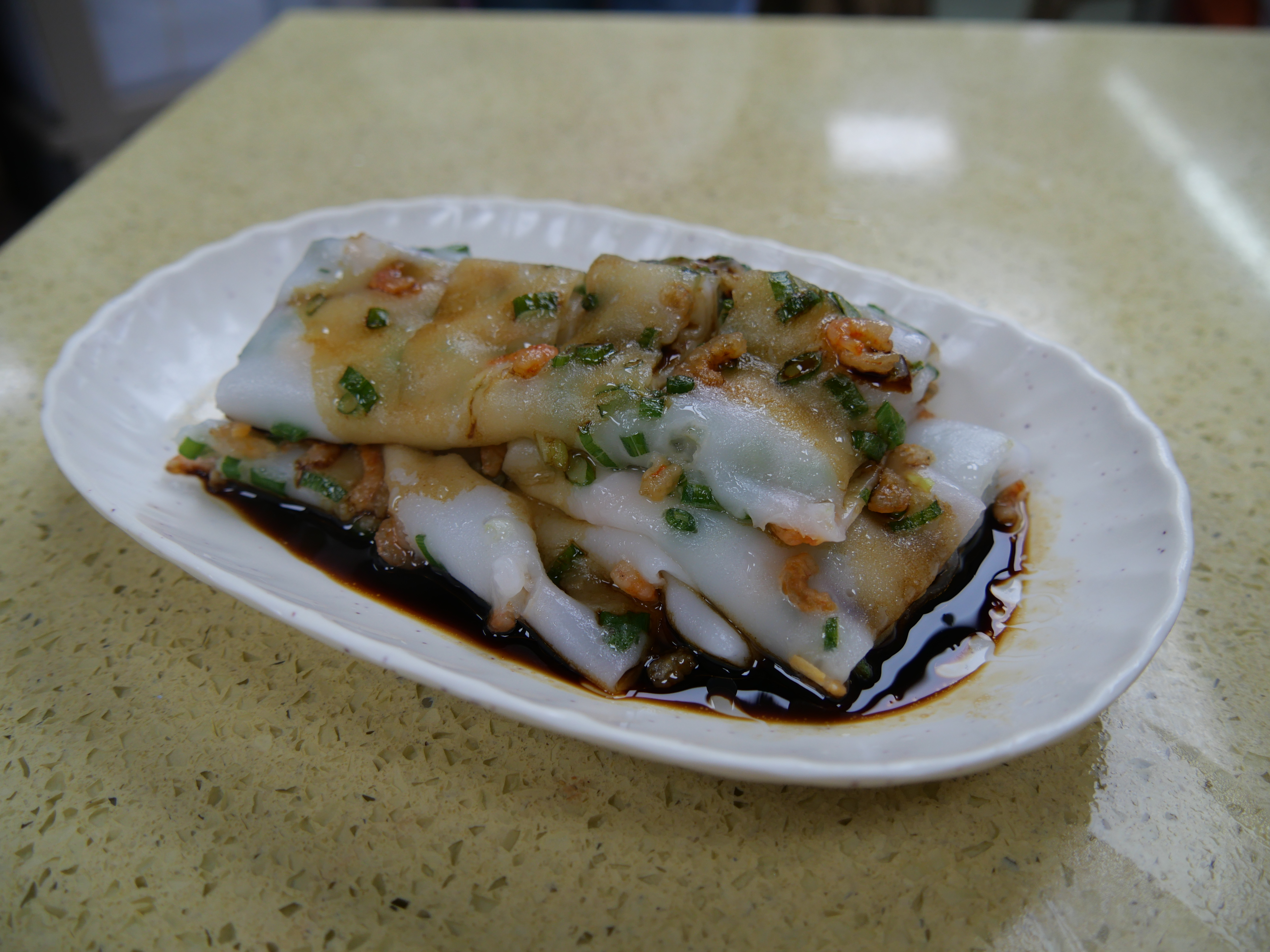

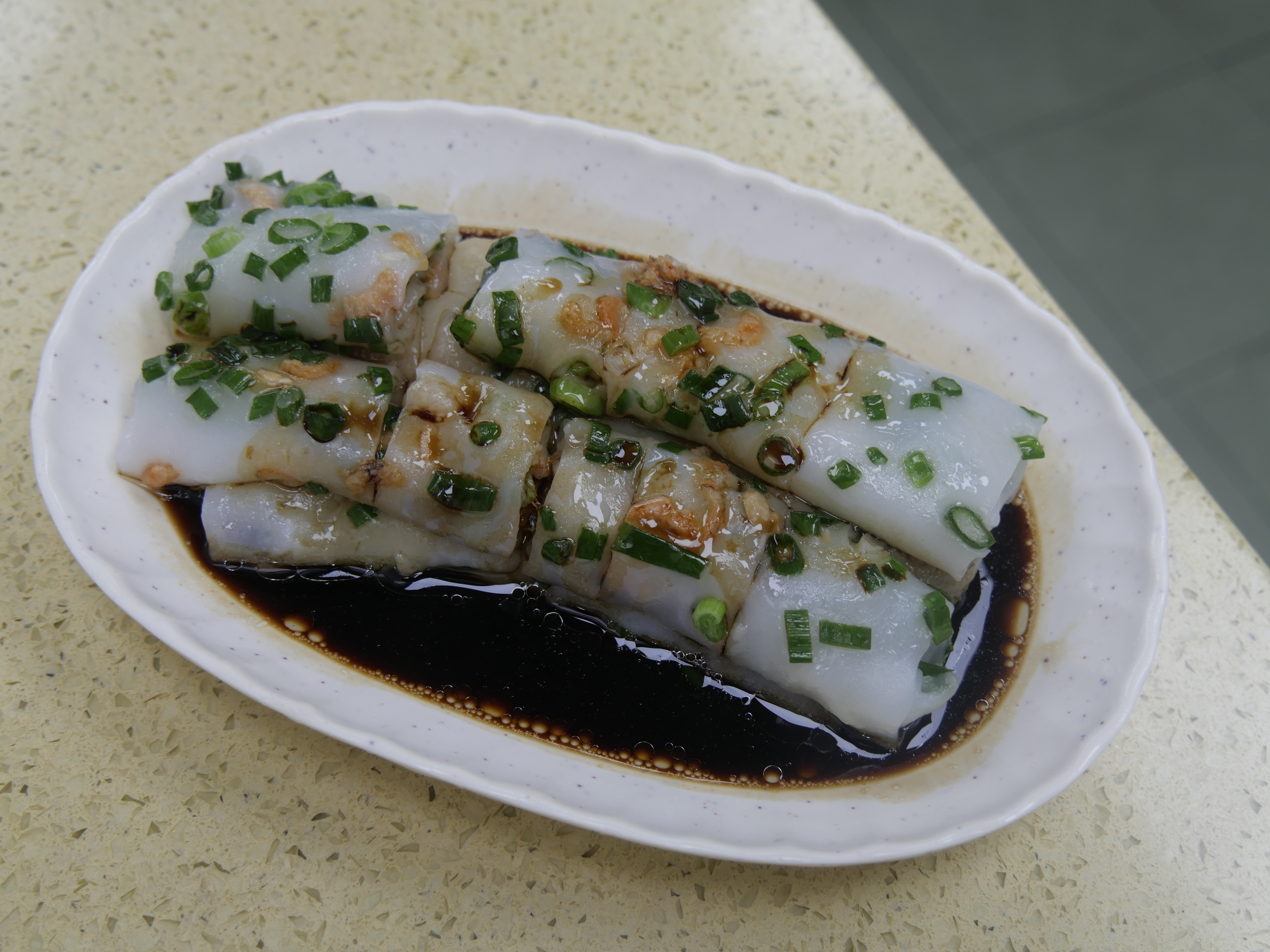

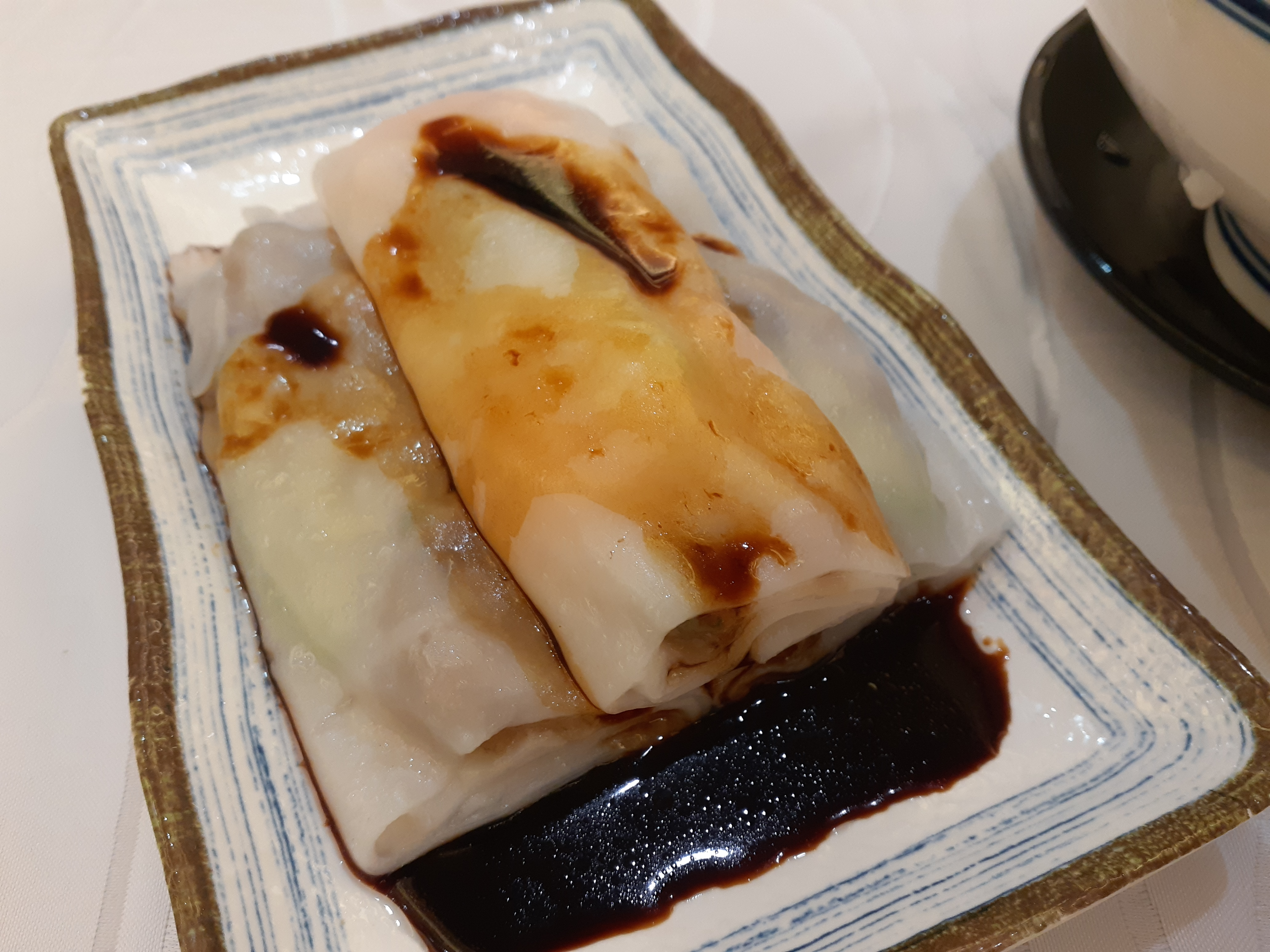

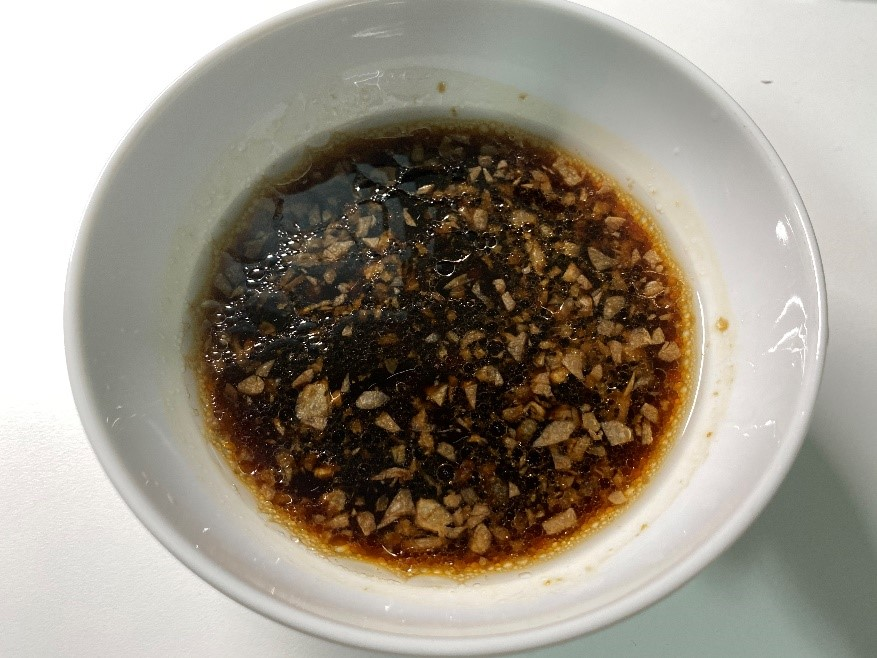
Mushroom garlic soy sauce

== See also ==
- List of steamed foods
- List of stuffed dishes
