= Bánh cuốn =

Vietnamese stuffed rice noodles

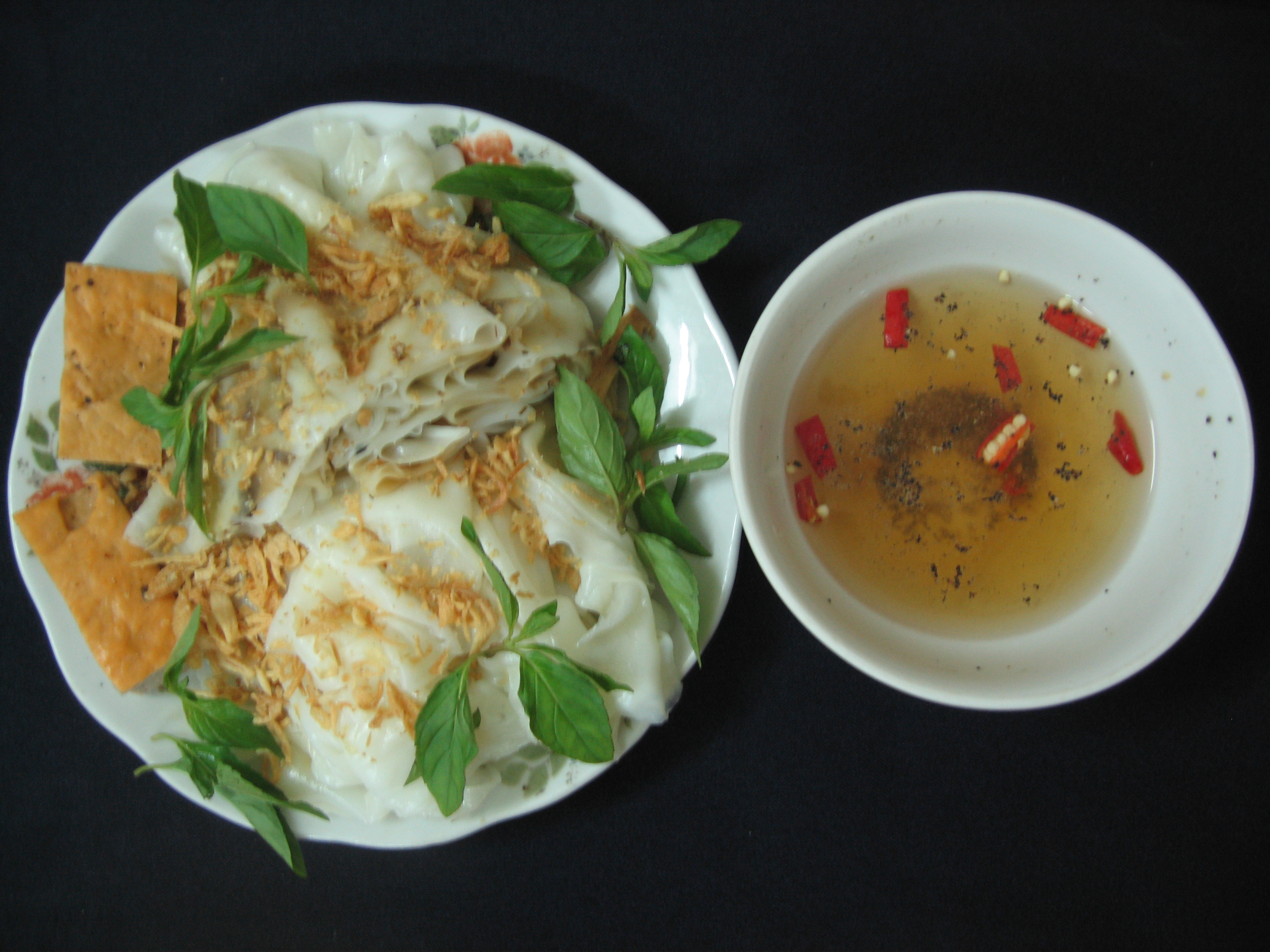
- Thanh Trì-styled bánh cuốn
- Alternative names: Bánh quấn
- Type: Rice noodle roll
- Place of origin: Northern Vietnam
- Associated cuisine: Vietnamese
- Main ingredients: Rice batter, ground pork, wood ear mushroom, shallots

Bánh cuốn or bánh quấn (Vietnamese: [ɓǎjŋ̟ kǔən], lit. roll) is a Vietnamese dish originating from Northern Vietnam.

== In Vietnamese cuisine ==
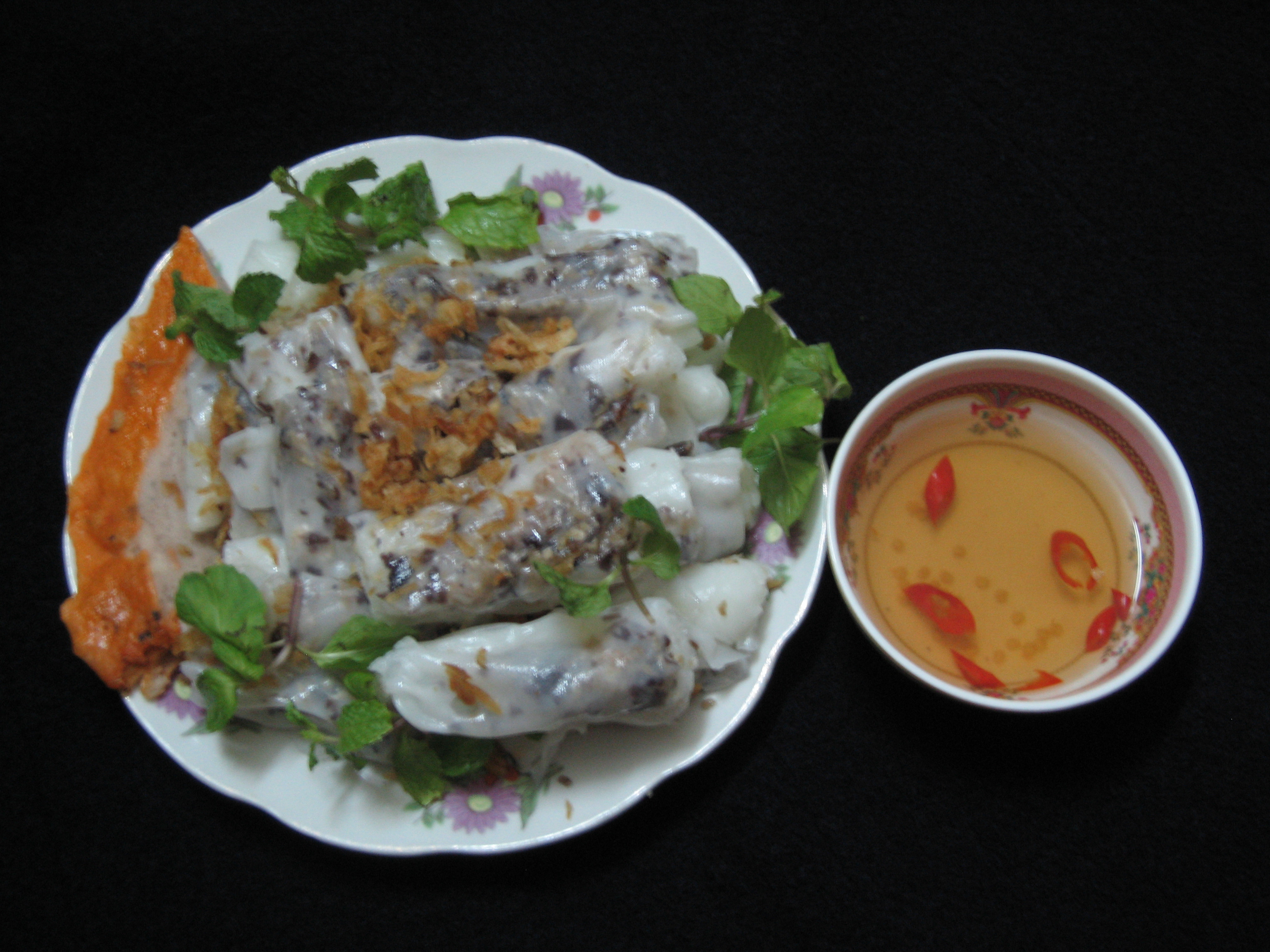
Hanoi-styled bánh cuốn

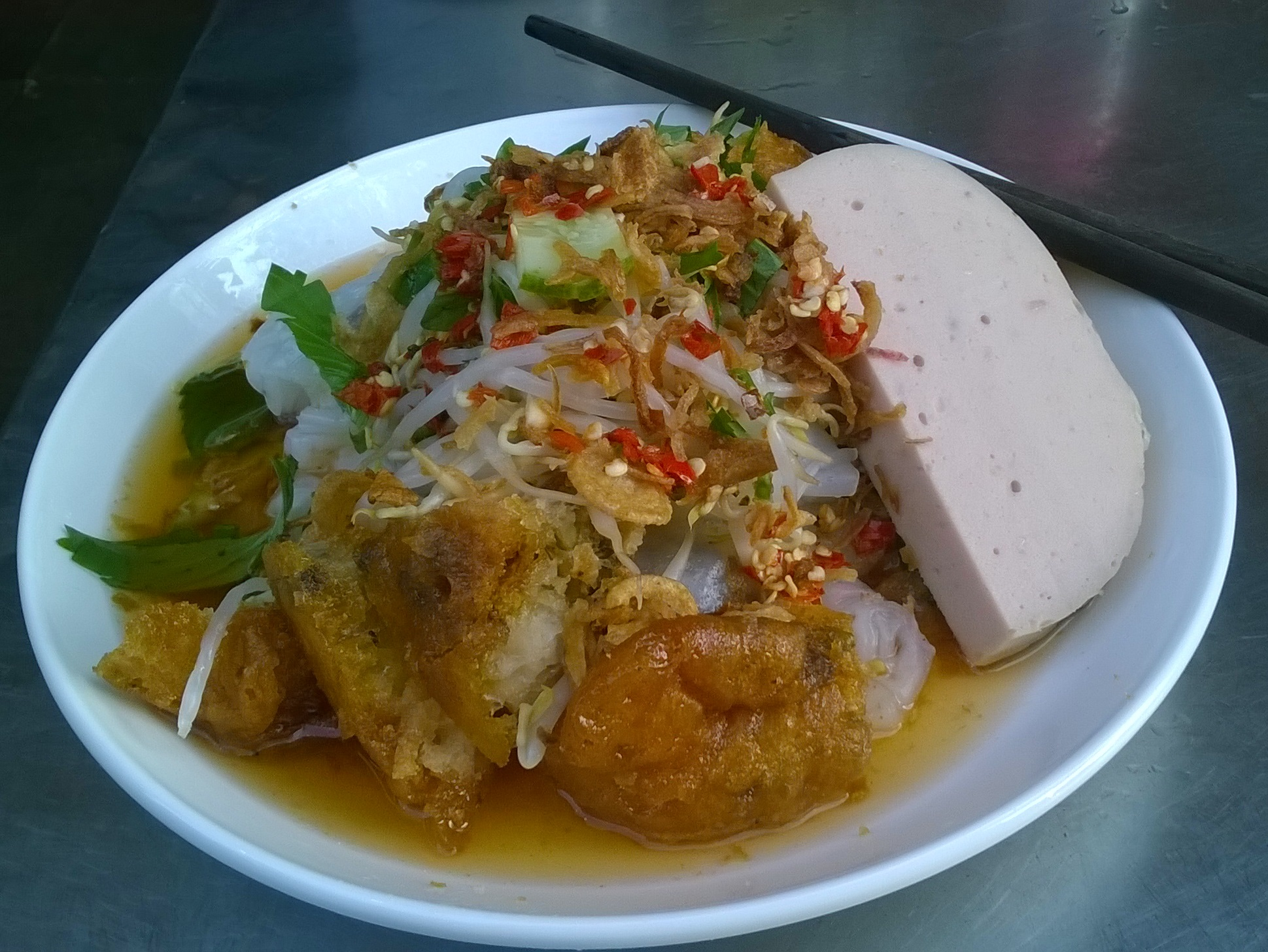
Saigon-styled bánh cuốn

Bánh cuốn is made from a thin, wide sheet of fermented rice batter filled with a mixture of cooked seasoned ground pork, minced wood ear mushroom, and minced shallots. Sides for this dish usually consist of chả lụa (Vietnamese pork sausage), sliced cucumber, and bean sprouts, with the dipping sauce, which is fish sauce, called nước chấm (fish sauce).

The rice sheet of bánh cuốn is extremely thin and delicate. It is made by steaming a slightly fermented rice batter on a cloth that is stretched over a pot of boiling water. It is a light dish and is generally eaten for breakfast everywhere in Vietnam. A different version of bánh cuốn, called bánh cuốn Thanh Trì and bánh cuốn làng Kênh, may be found in Thanh Trì, a southern district of Hanoi and Kênh village of Nam Định, an ancient village in the center of Nam Định city. Bánh cuốn Thanh Trì or Bánh cuốn làng Kênh are not rolls, but just rice sheets eaten with chả lụa, fried shallots, or prawns.

Bánh ướt is simply the unfilled rice sheet, and is typically served with bean sprouts, chopped lettuce, sliced cucumber, fresh basil and mint, fried shallots and onions, chả or giò lụa, and fish sauce.

== In other countries ==
=== Pak moh yuan ===
In regards to Vietnamese culture, Thai cuisine commonly refers to the dish as pak moh yuan (Thai: ปากหม้อญวน). Skilled food preparers will make each rice sheet extra thin with as much stuffing as possible. Rice sheets are usually made of arrowroot flour which gives a tapioca-like consistency. The dough may also be infused with naturally extracted herbs such as butterfly pea for blue shades and pandan for green shades. As for the stuffing, the most popular stuffing is ground pork with cilantro roots, pepper, garlic, shallots and preserved radish. Less common stuffing is chicken, mushroom, corn, coconut, bean sprouts, chives, etc. Vegetarian recipes are also available.

Pak moh yuan is often served with sauces and toppings. While sweet chili sauce is the standard, recipes from certain regions may also use seafood ingredients in their sauce. Coconut milk may be drizzled on top as a sweet option. The dish may be garnished with fried garlic and served with lettuce and fresh chili on the side.

=== Khao phan ===
Another variation known in Thai cuisine is khao phan (Thai: ข้าวพันผัก, lit. 'rice wrap'). It is regarded a specialty of Uttaradit province where it is eaten freshly made in many variations, but also sun-dried. The dried versions often have spices added to them and are popularly used as a wrap for a spicy salad made with rice noodles and minced pork.

== Gallery ==
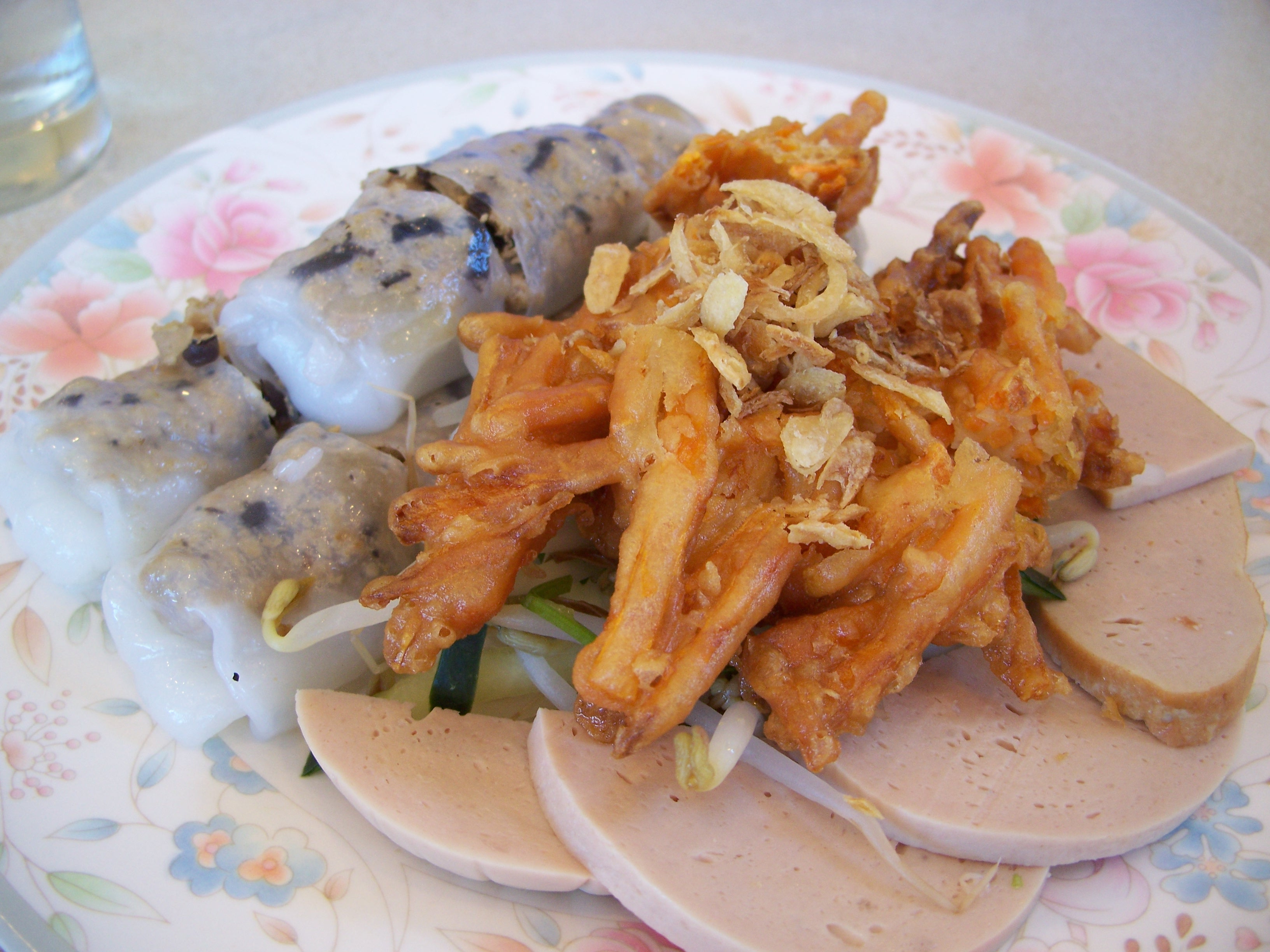
Bánh cuốn Tây Hồ with shrimp tempura and chả lụa

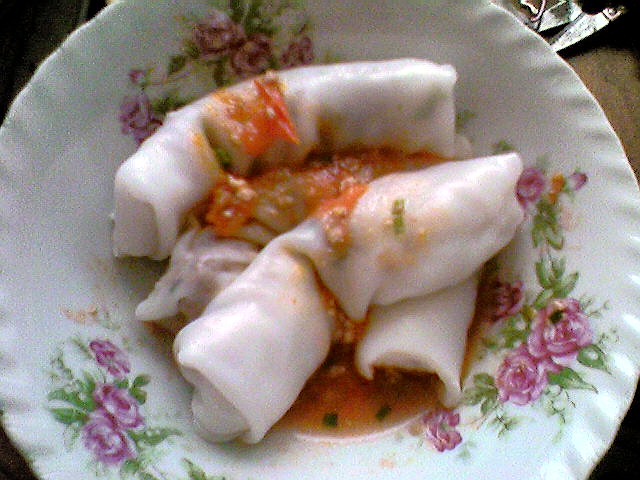
A dish of homemade bánh cuốn

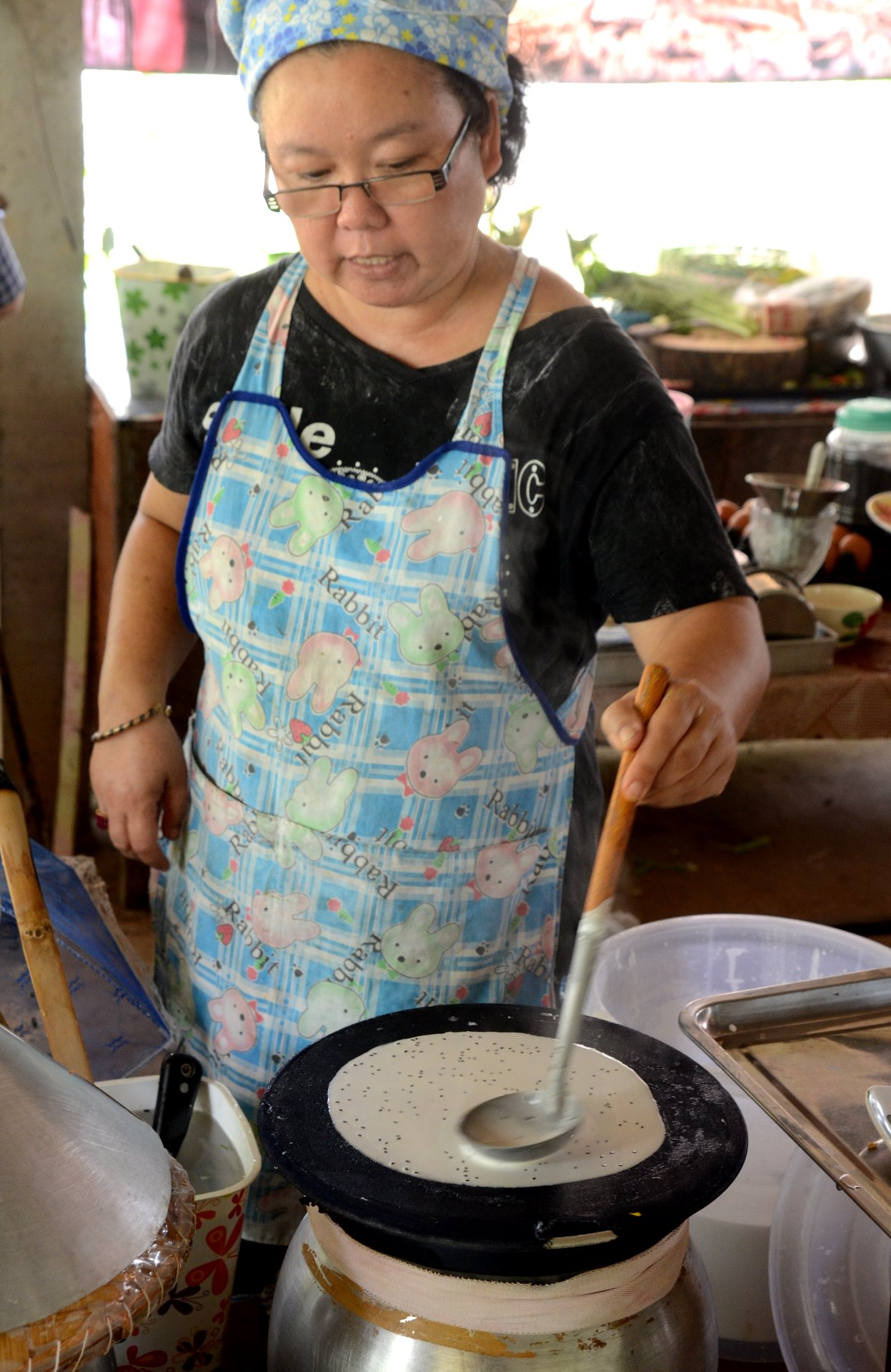
The batter for khao phan, as the noodle roll is called in Thailand, is spread out over a cloth stretched over a pot of boiling water.

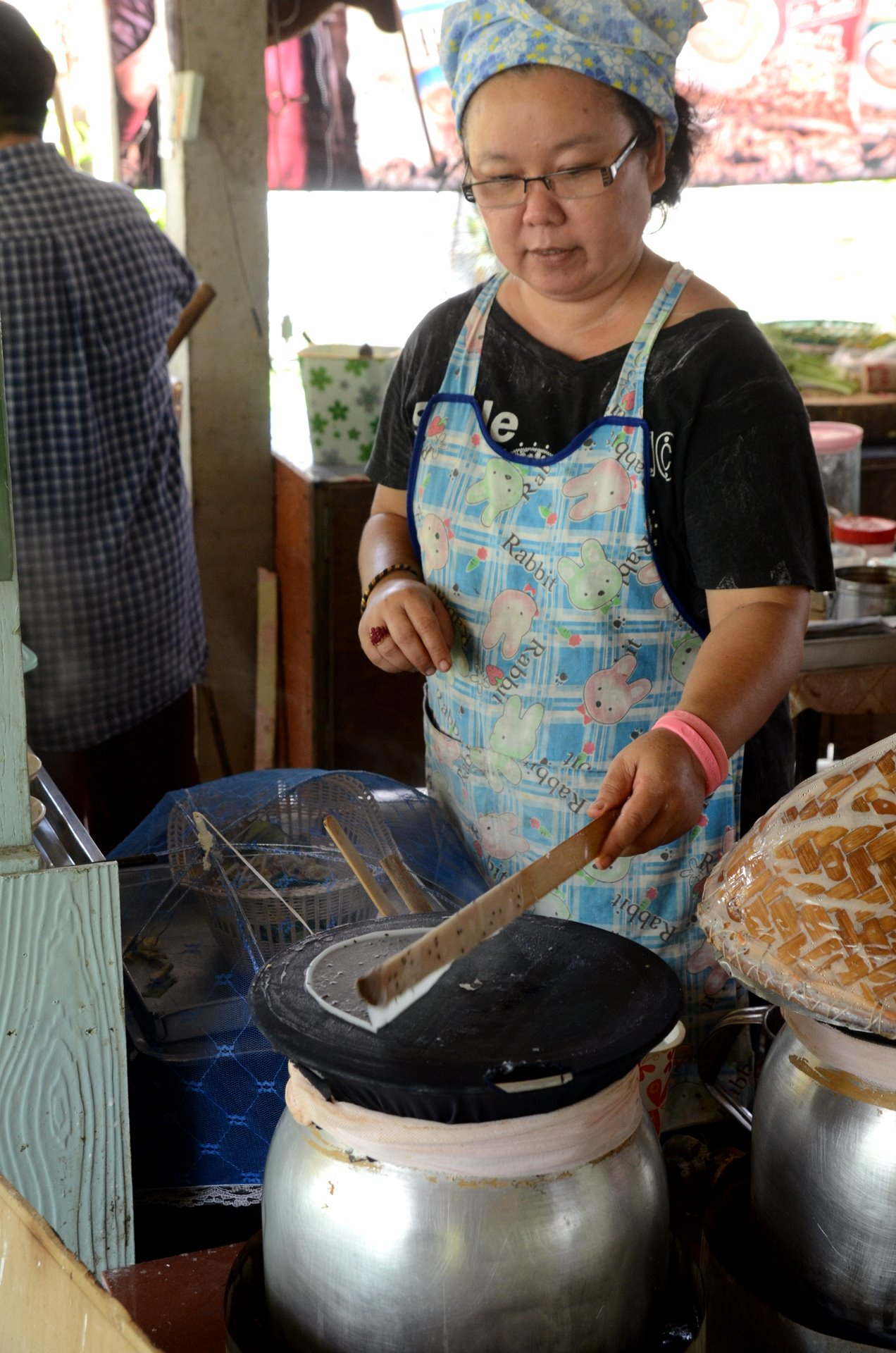
Rolling up the finished product

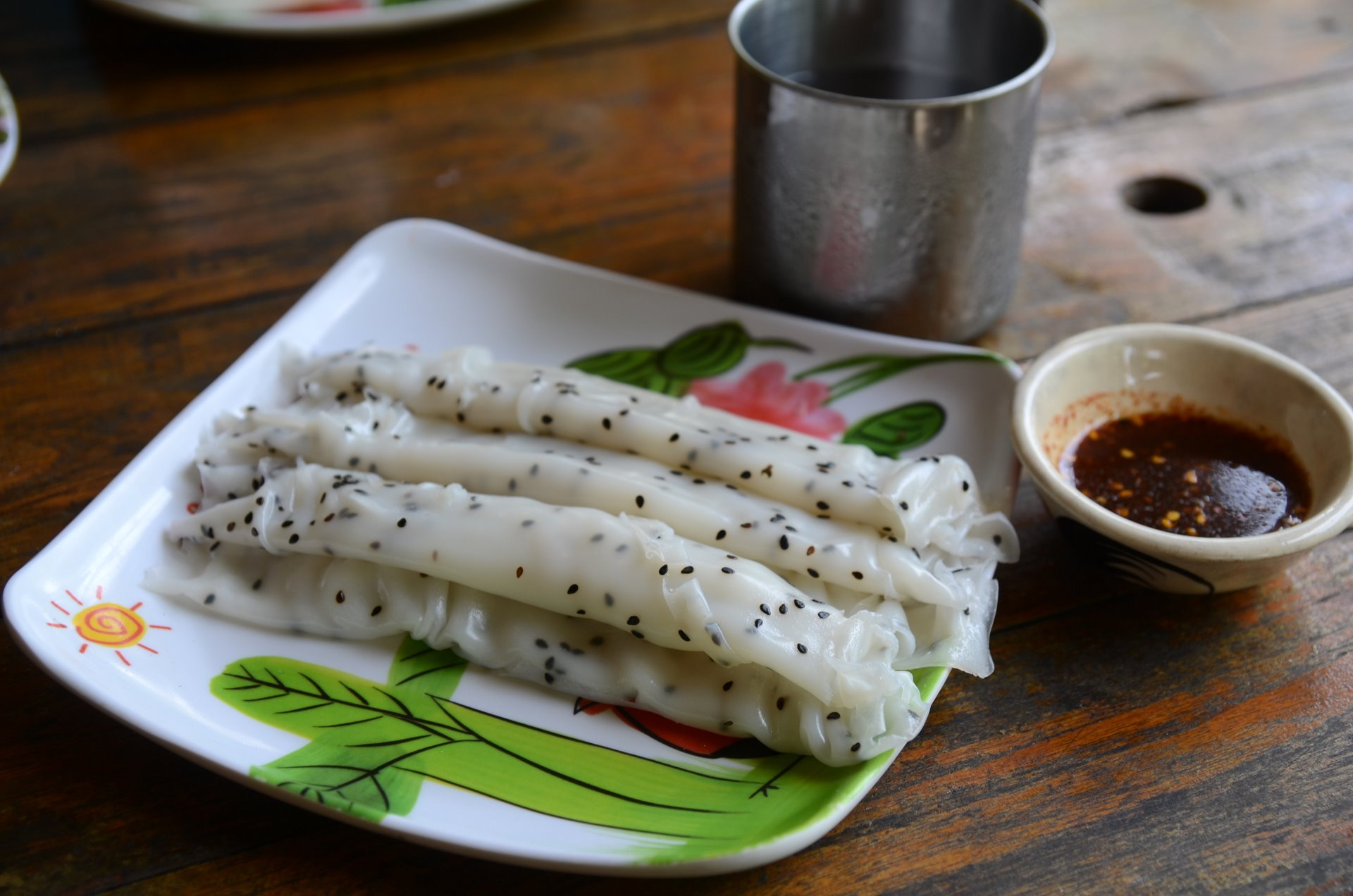
A variation of the Thai khao phan with black sesame seeds and served with a spicy dipping sauce called nam chim chaeo

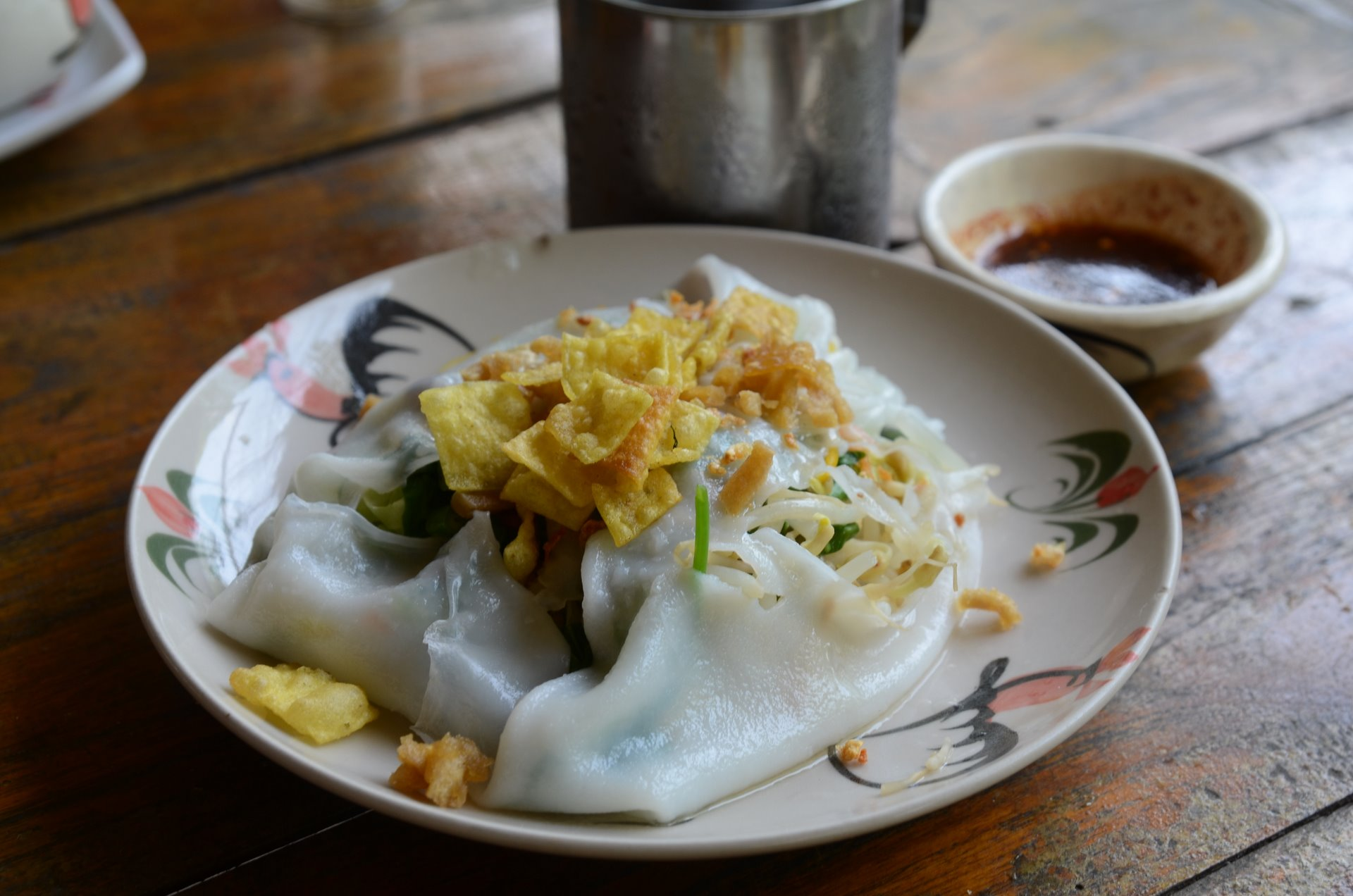
Khao phan phak, a variation with stir-fried vegetables

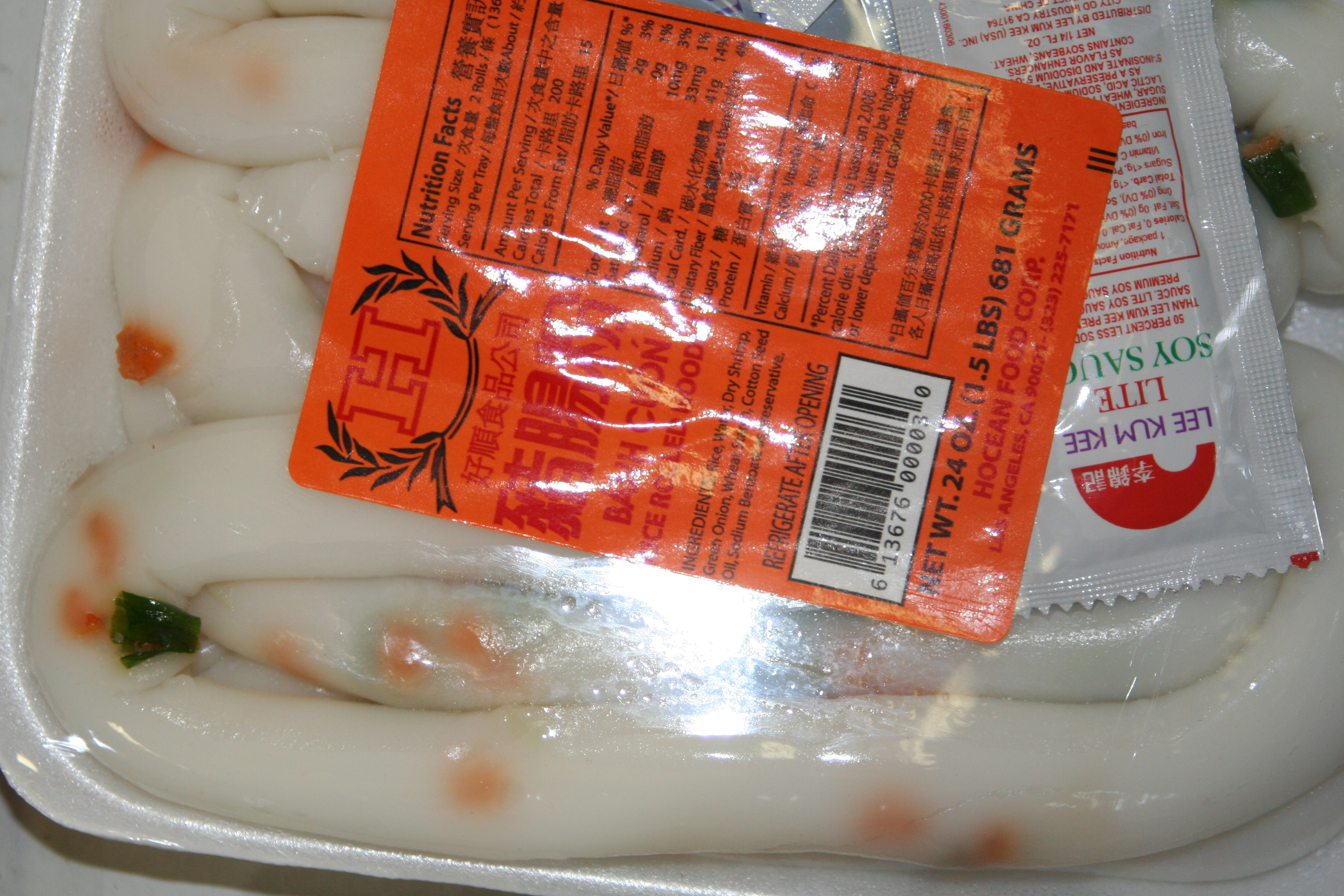
Bánh cuốn sold at a market in California

== Bánh ướt ==
Bánh ướt (Vietnamese: [ɓǎjŋ̟ ʔɨ̌ət], lit. 'wet cake'), is a Vietnamese thin pancake wrapper consisting of rice noodle sheets, eaten with nước chấm, fried shallots, and a side of chả lụa (Vietnamese pork sausage).

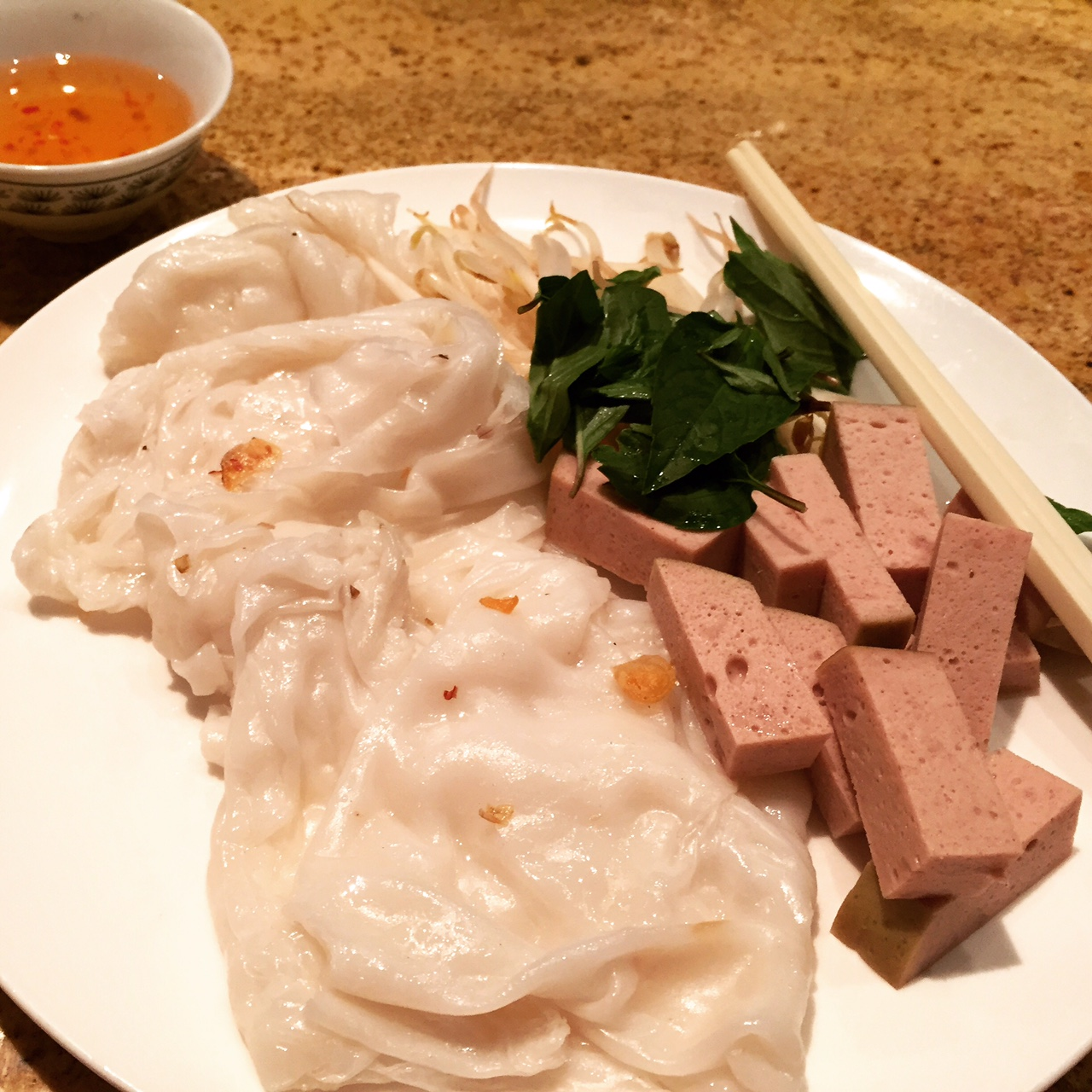
Typical serving of bánh ướt with chả lụa

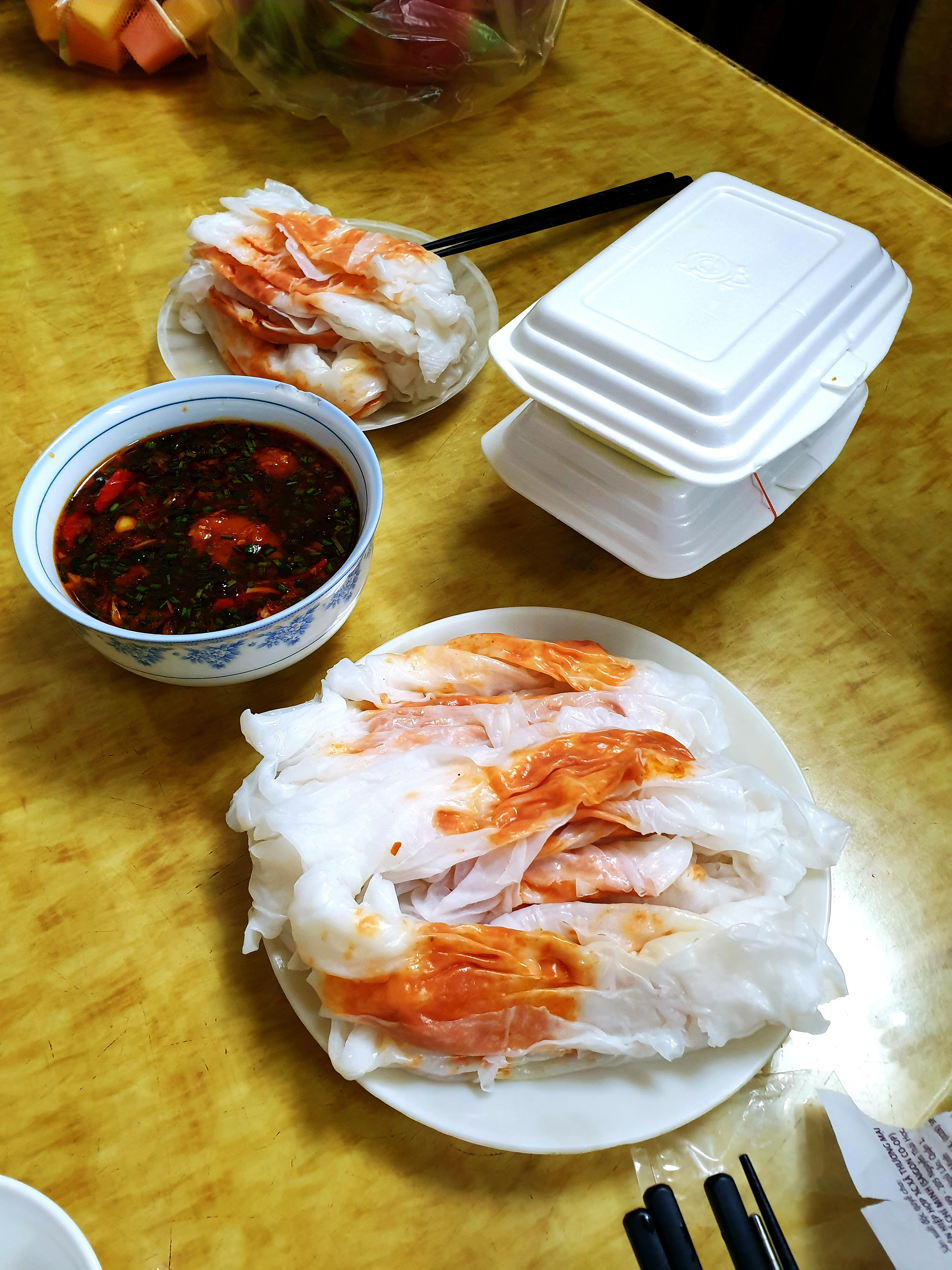
Bánh ướt from Phương Lang, Quảng Trị province

== See also ==
- Bánh xèo
- Bánh
- List of fermented foods
- List of pancakes
- Rice noodle roll
- Shahe fen
