= Chả lụa =

Vietnamese sausage

Chả lụa Giò lụa
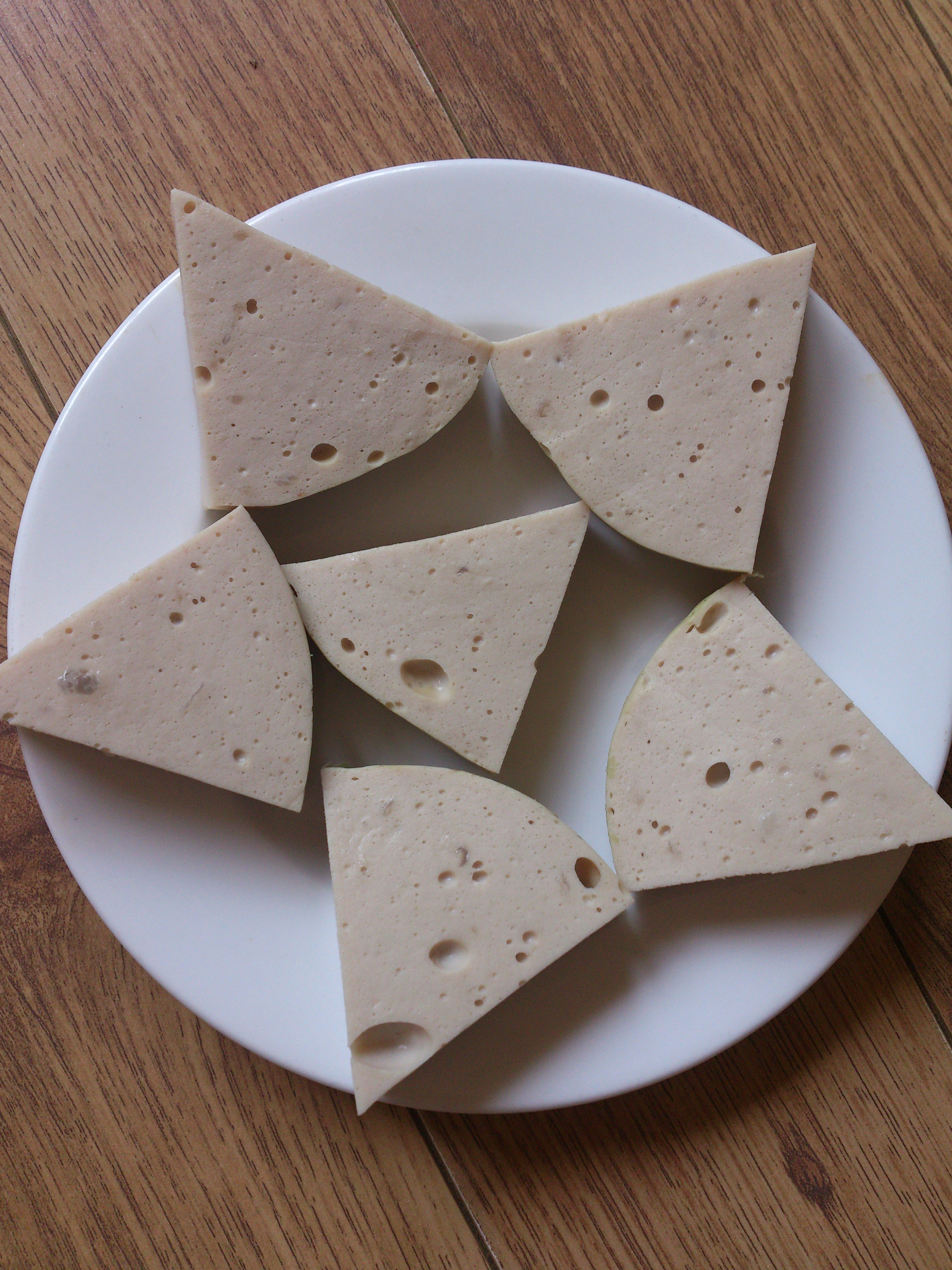
- A plate of giò lụa
- Type: Sausage
- Place of origin: Vietnam
- Main ingredients: Pork, banana leaves

Chả lụa (Saigon: [ca᷉ lûˀə]) or giò lụa (Hanoi: [zɔ̂ lûˀə]), lit. 'banana leaf pork sausage' is a type of sausage in Vietnamese cuisine, made of pork and traditionally steamed while wrapped in banana leaves.

== Production and consumption ==
Chả lụa is made of lean pork, potato starch, garlic, ground black pepper, and fish sauce. The pork is traditionally pounded into a paste, seasoned, then steamed inside a package made of banana leaves until cooked.

The sausage is widely applicable, being eaten in bánh cuốn, bánh mì, xôi, and more.

=== Variants ===
Variants include:

- chả bì – containing shredded pork skin
- chả bò – beef sausage with herbs
- chả chiên – where the entire sausage is deep-fried (instead of steamed, omitting the banana leaf wrap)
  - chả quế – chả chiên that is seasoned with powdered cinnamon before frying
- chả Huế – contains whole black peppercorns and more garlic

== Moo yor ==
Chả lụa has become popular in Thai cuisine, where it is in the form of หมูยอ ([mǔː jɔ̄ː], moo yor; Lao: ຫມູຍໍ, [mǔː jɔ̄ː]), combining หมู, lit. 'pig', with a calque of giò.

== Gallery ==
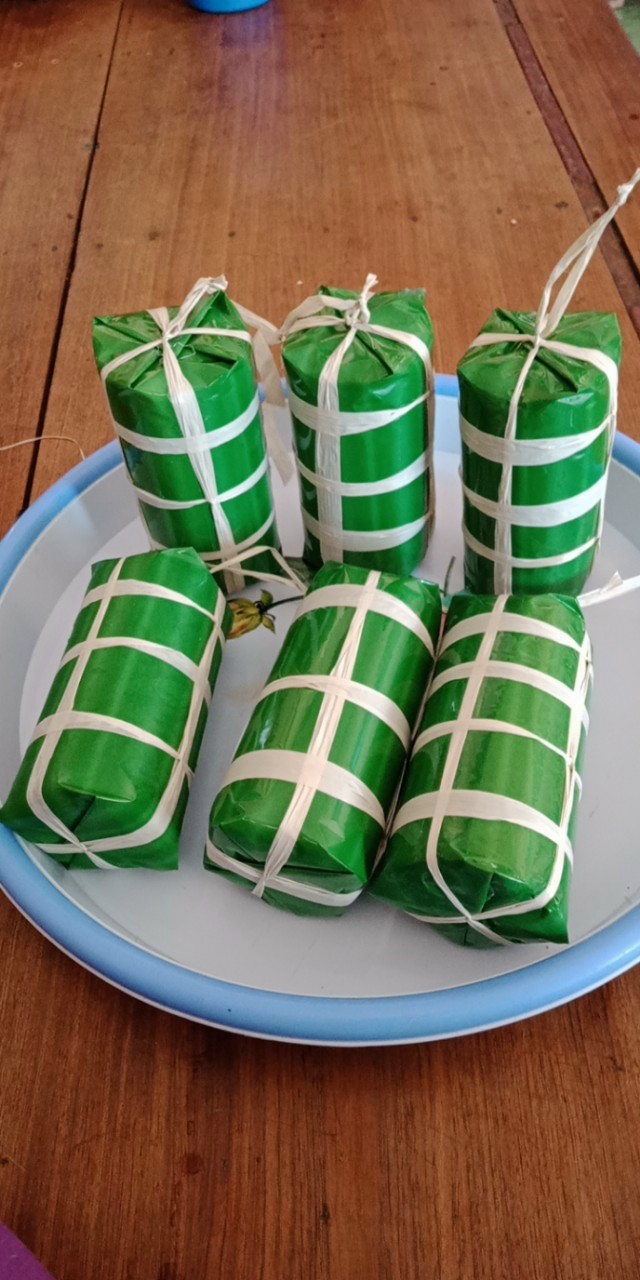
Giò lụa before being peeled

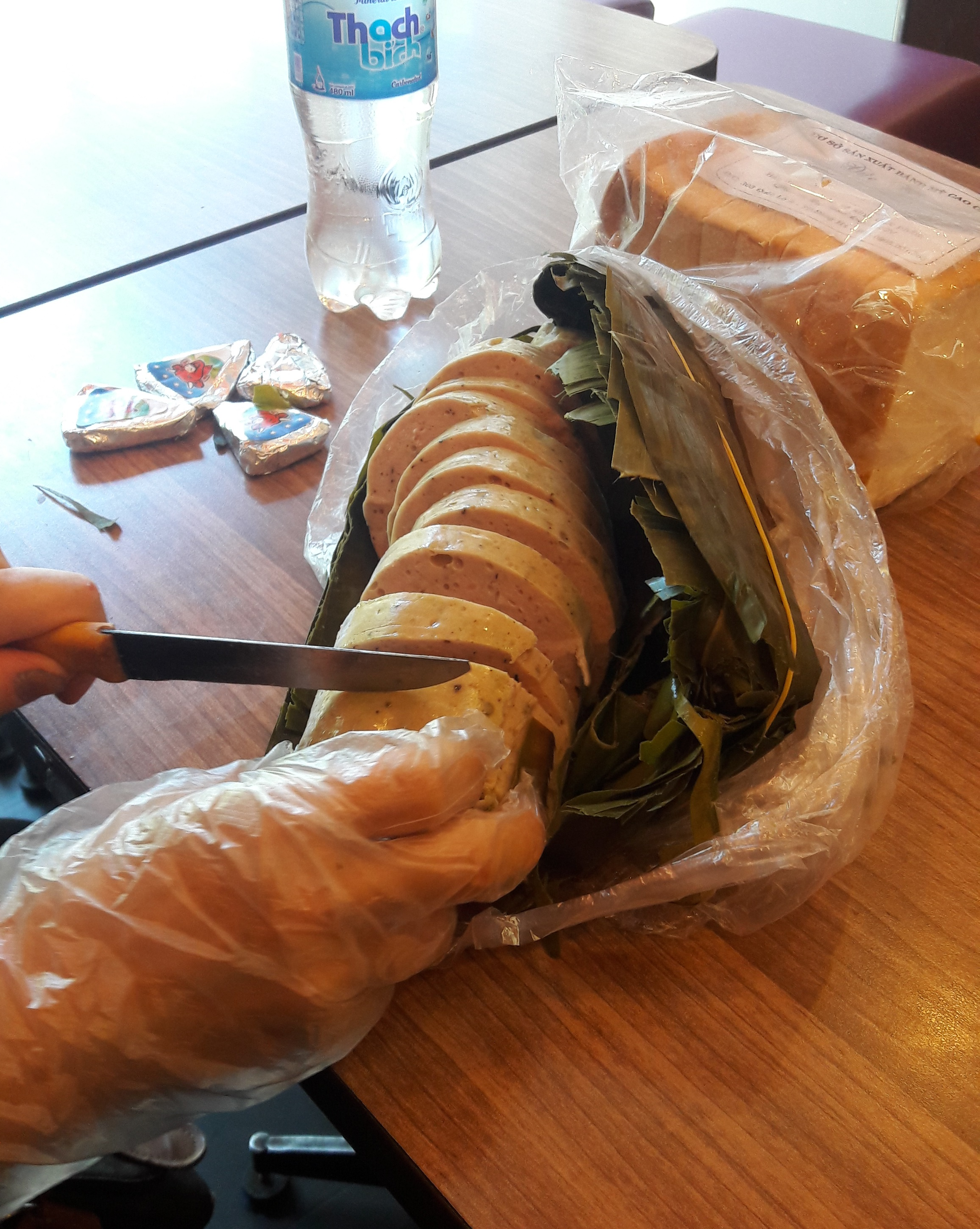
Chả lụa being cut with a knife

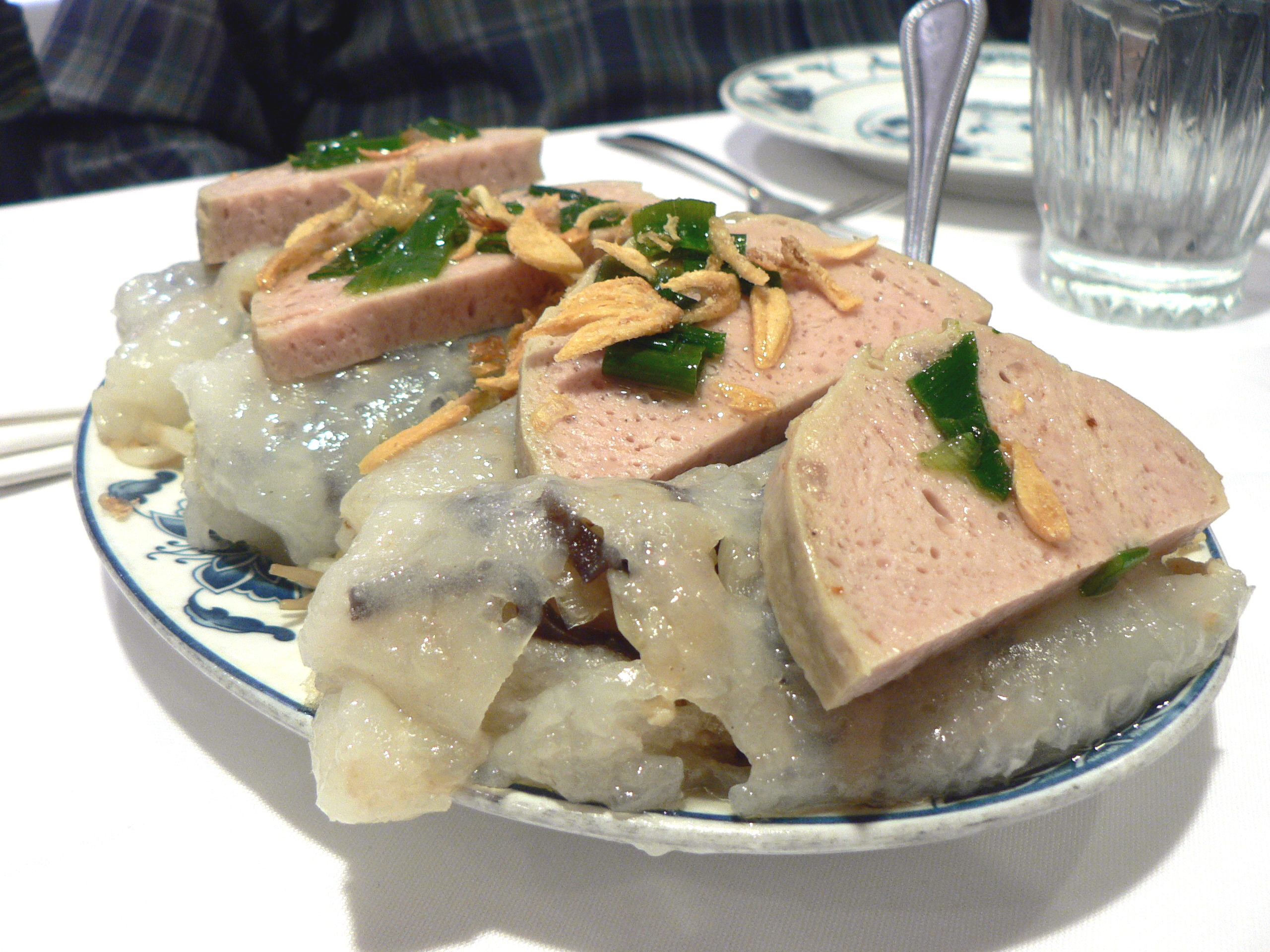
Sliced chả lụa served over bánh cuốn, garnished with fried shallots

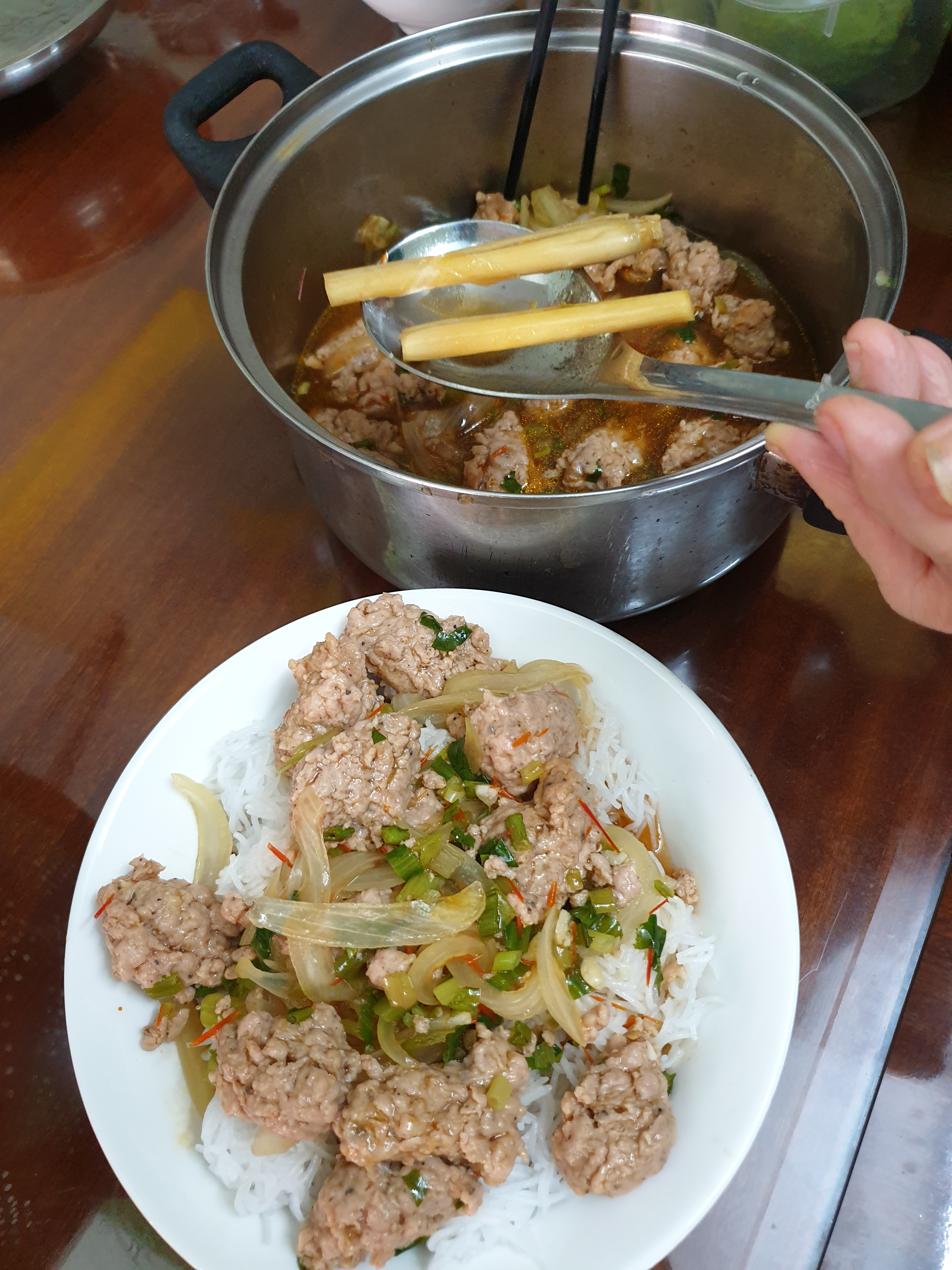
Giò sống

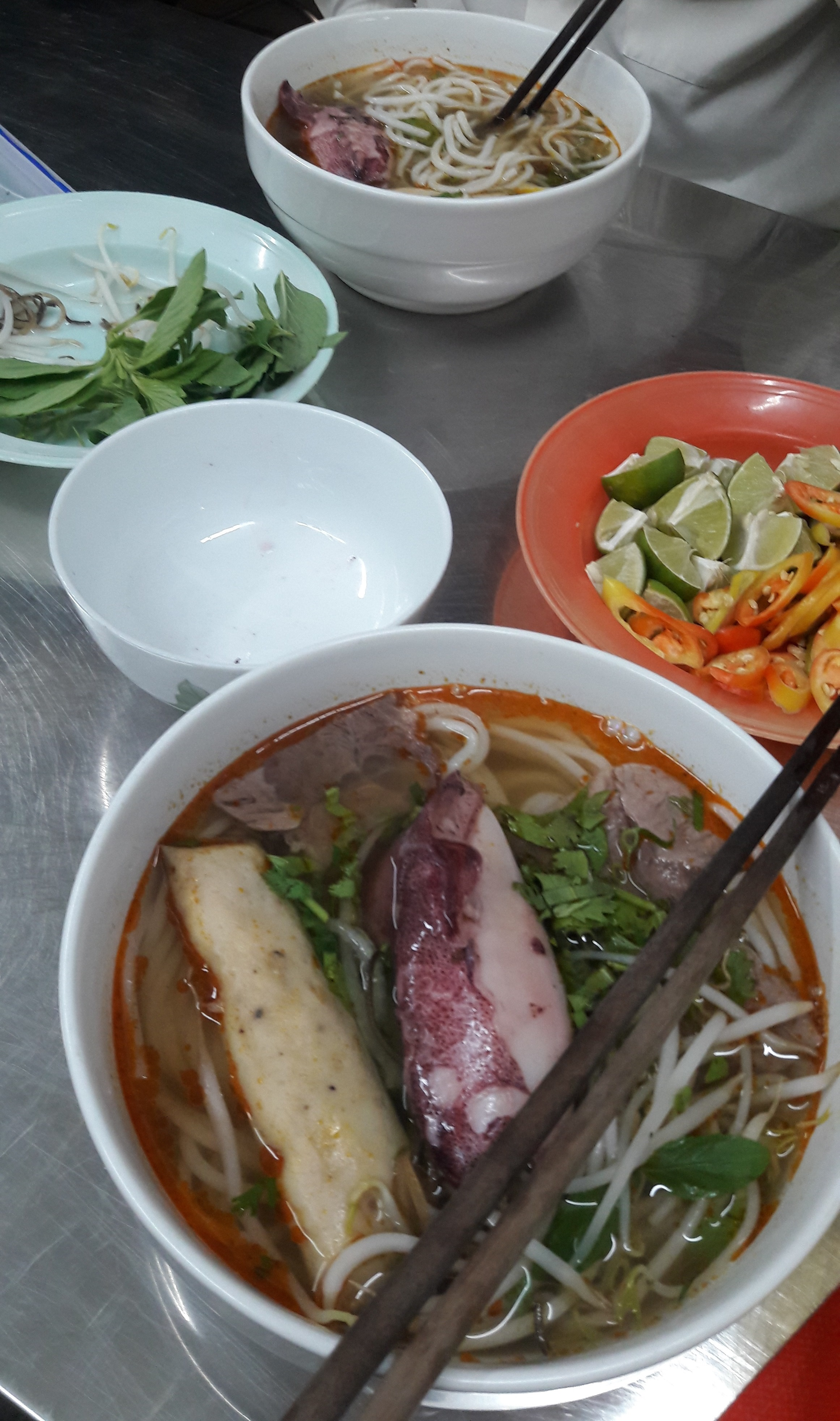
Chả Huế in a bowl of bún bò Huế

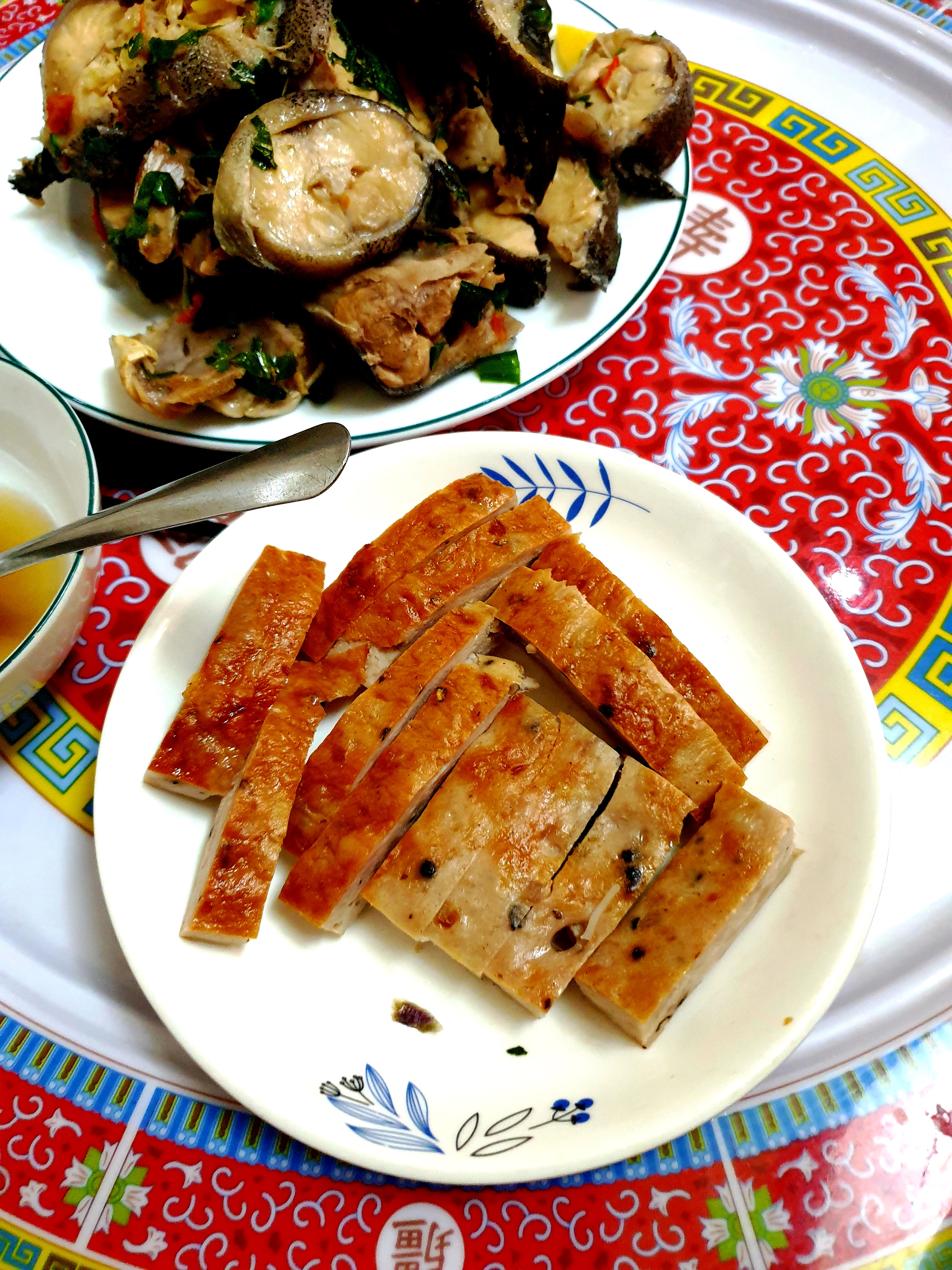
Chả chiên

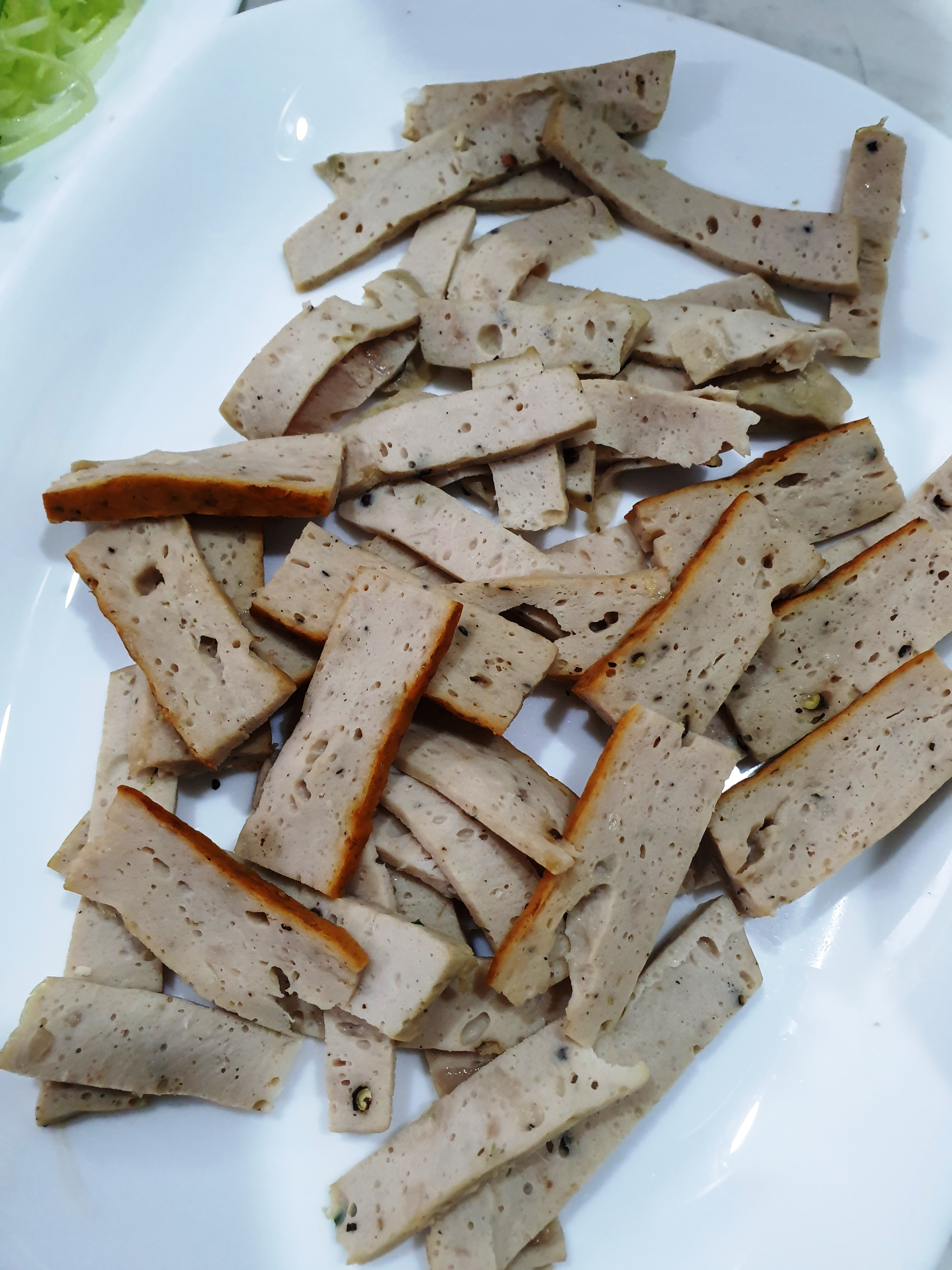
Chả quế

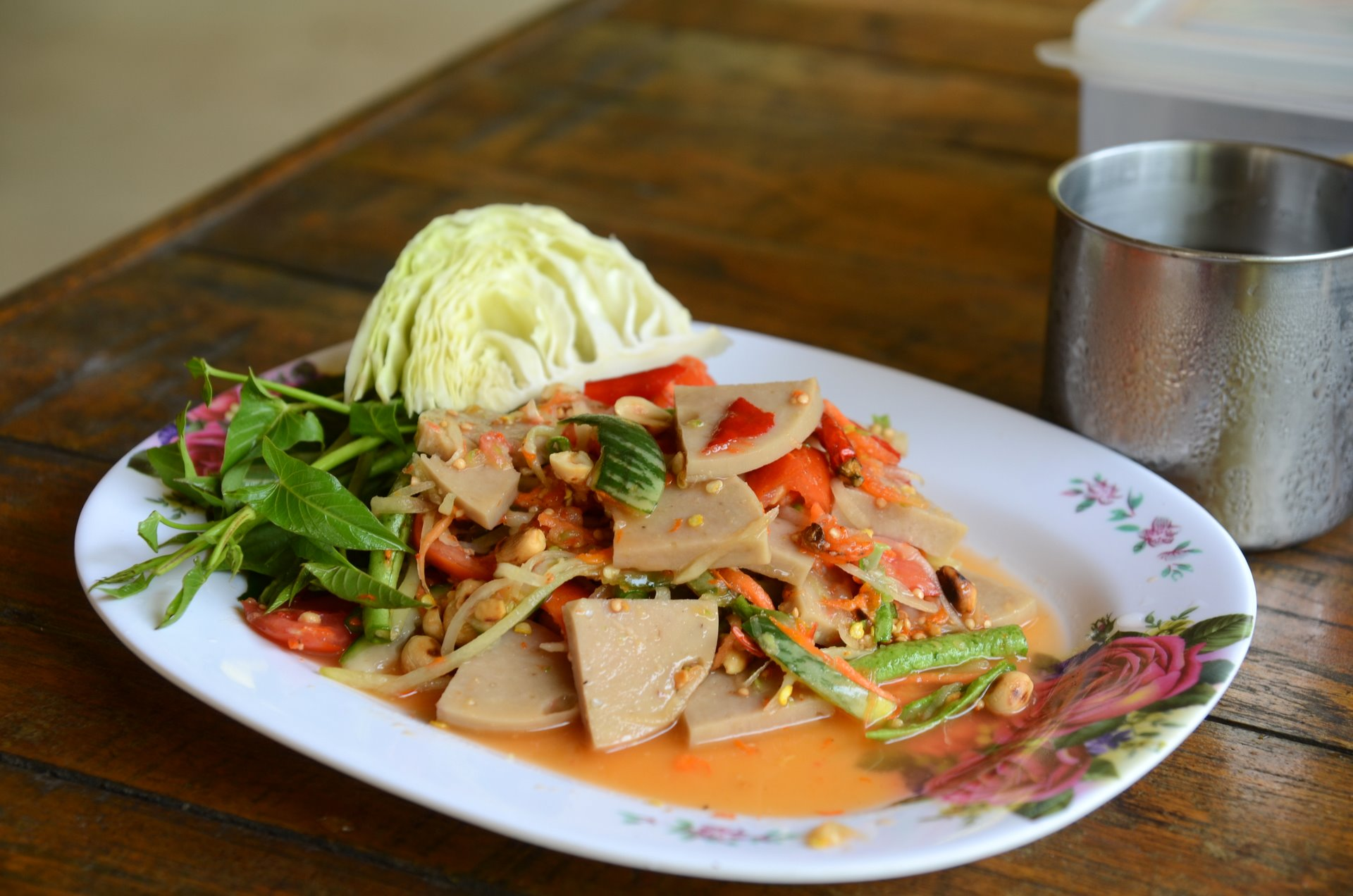
Mu yo with a som tam dressing

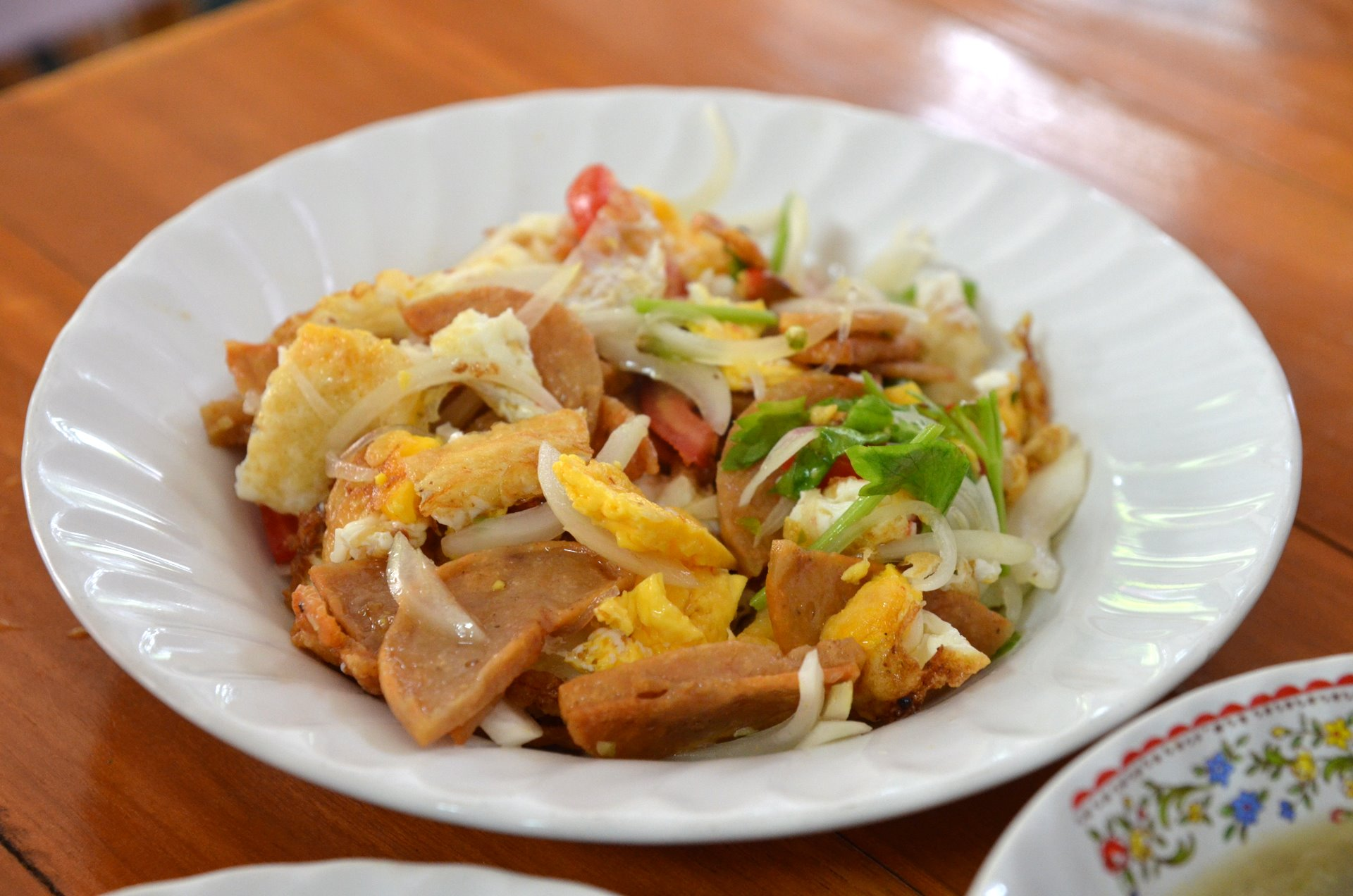
Yam mu yo thot khai dao, a spicy Thai salad made with fried mu yo and khai dao
