= Khanon i =

Steamed glutinous rice and peanut oil

- Type: Snack (mont)
- Place of origin: Myanmar (Burma)
- Region or state: Southeast Asia
- Associated cuisine: Burmese
- Main ingredients: Glutinous rice, peanut oil, coconut shavings

Khanon i (Burmese: ခနုံအီ; pronounced [kʰənòʊɴʔì]; also spelt khanon e) is a traditional Burmese snack or mont. The word khanon comes from Thai khanom (lit. 'dessert'). The snack is essentially a patty of steamed glutinous rice and peanut oil, garnished with coconut shavings.

Khanon i originates in Upper Myanmar, where it is considered a royal delicacy, along with khanon htok. A series of Burmese–Siamese wars beginning with Hsinbyushin's reign resulted in the emergence of Thai-inspired delicacies, including khanon htok, shwe yin aye, and mont let hsaung.
