= Mont (food) =

Burmese food

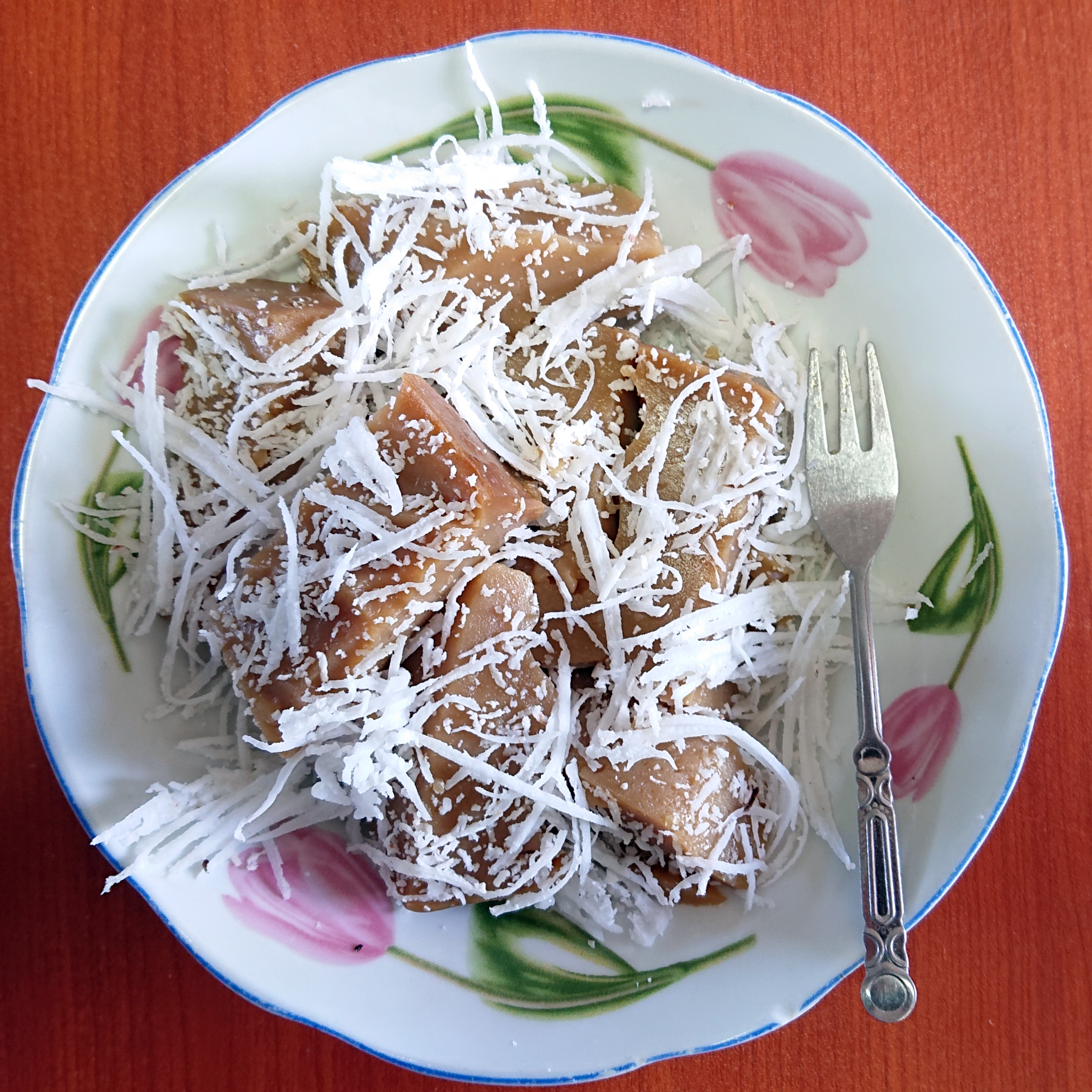
- A plate of mont kywe the, a rice flour cake sweetened with jaggery and garnished with grated coconut
- Type: Snack or dessert
- Place of origin: Myanmar (Burma)
- Region or state: Southeast Asia
- Associated cuisine: Burmese cuisine
- Main ingredients: Various
- Similar dishes: Bánh, Kakanin, Khanom, Kue, Kuih

In the Burmese language, the term mont (Burmese: မုန့်; pronounced [mo̰ʊɴ]) translates to "snack", and refers to a wide variety of prepared foods, ranging from sweet desserts to savory food items that may be cooked by steaming, baking, frying, deep-frying, or boiling. Foods made from wheat or rice flour are generally called mont, but the term may also refer to certain varieties of noodle dishes, such as mohinga. Burmese mont are typically eaten with tea during breakfast or afternoon tea time.

Each variety of mont is designated by a descriptive word or phrase that precedes or follows the word mont, such as htoe mont (lit. 'snack that is prodded') or mont lone yay baw (lit. 'floating snack balls'). The term mont has been borrowed into several regional languages, including into Shan as မုၼ်း and into Jingpho as muk.

In Burmese, the term mont is not limited to Burmese cuisine: it applies equally to items as varied as Western-style breads (ပေါင်မုန့် or paung mont), Chinese moon cakes (လမုန့် or la mont), ice cream (ရေခဲမုန့် or yay ge mont) and tinned biscuits (မုန့်သေတ္တာ or mont thitta).

== Ingredients ==
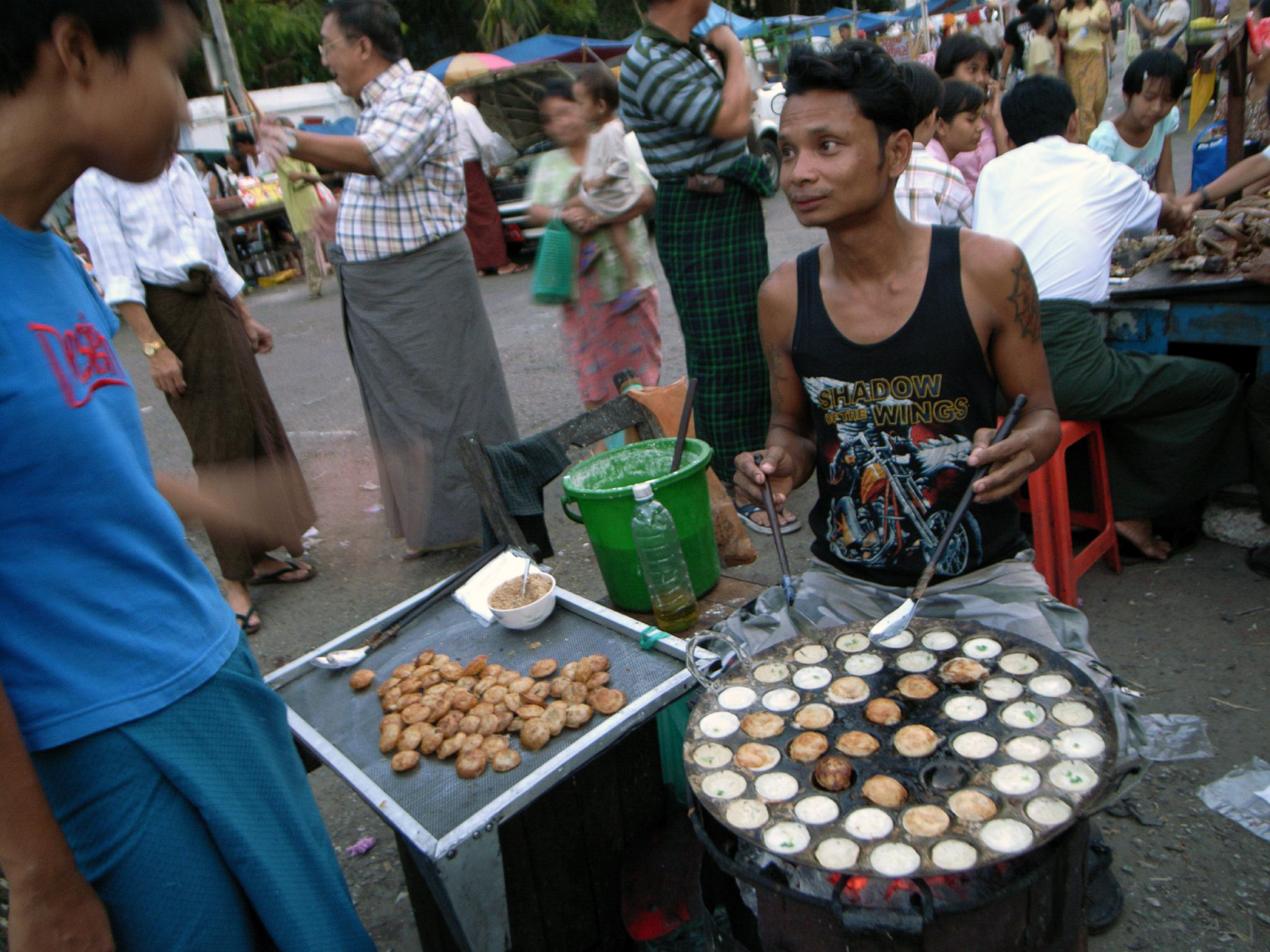
A Burmese hawker making mont lin maya in Yangon.

Lower-amylose rice varieties are commonly used as a key ingredient in Burmese mont. Sweet Burmese mont are generally less sweet than counterparts in other parts of Southeast Asia, instead deriving their natural sweetness from constituent ingredients (e.g., grated coconut, coconut milk, glutinous rice, etc.).

== Varieties ==
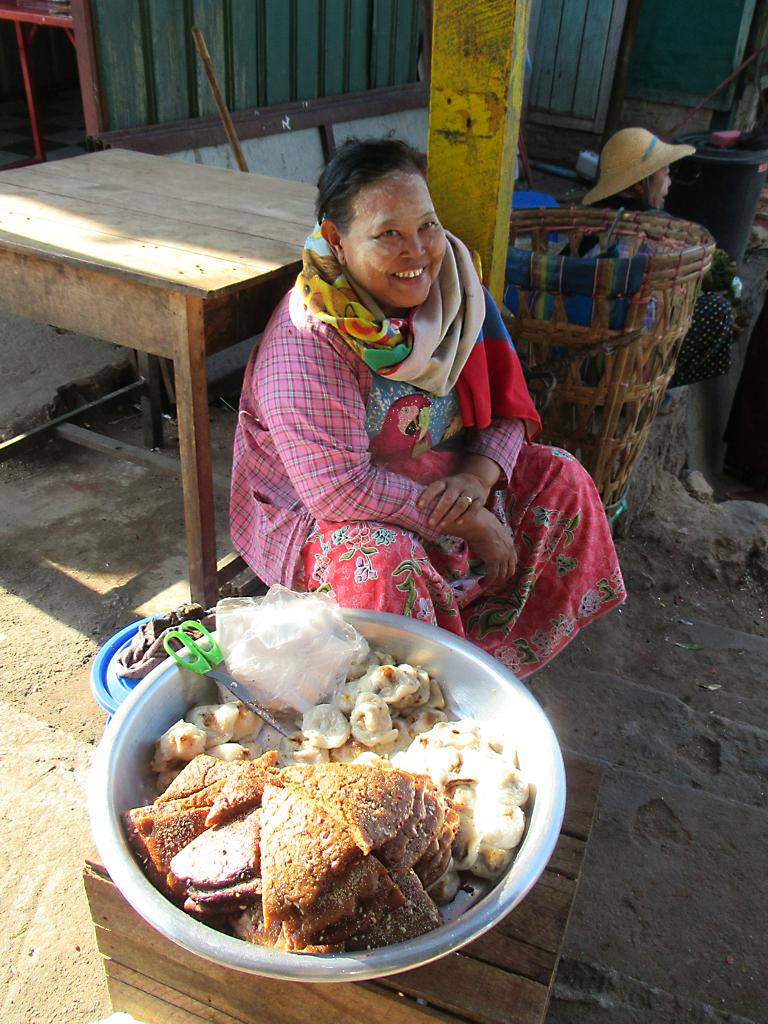
A hawker near Kyaiktiyo Pagoda selling a variety of traditional mont

There is a nearly endless variety of named dishes with the prefix or suffix mont. What follows is a list of the most typical traditional varieties of mont.

=== Noodles ===
Noodle dishes made with fresh rice vermicelli, which is called mont phat (မုန့်ဖတ်), are typically prefixed with the term mont, including:

- Mont hinga (မုန့်ဟင်းခါး) – savory noodle soup made in a fish broth
- Mont di (မုန့်တီ) – a variety of regional dishes throughout Myanmar that use mont phat
- Mandalay mont di (မန္တလေးမုန့်တီ) - a noodle salad from Mandalay that uses thick round rice noodles

=== Savory snacks ===
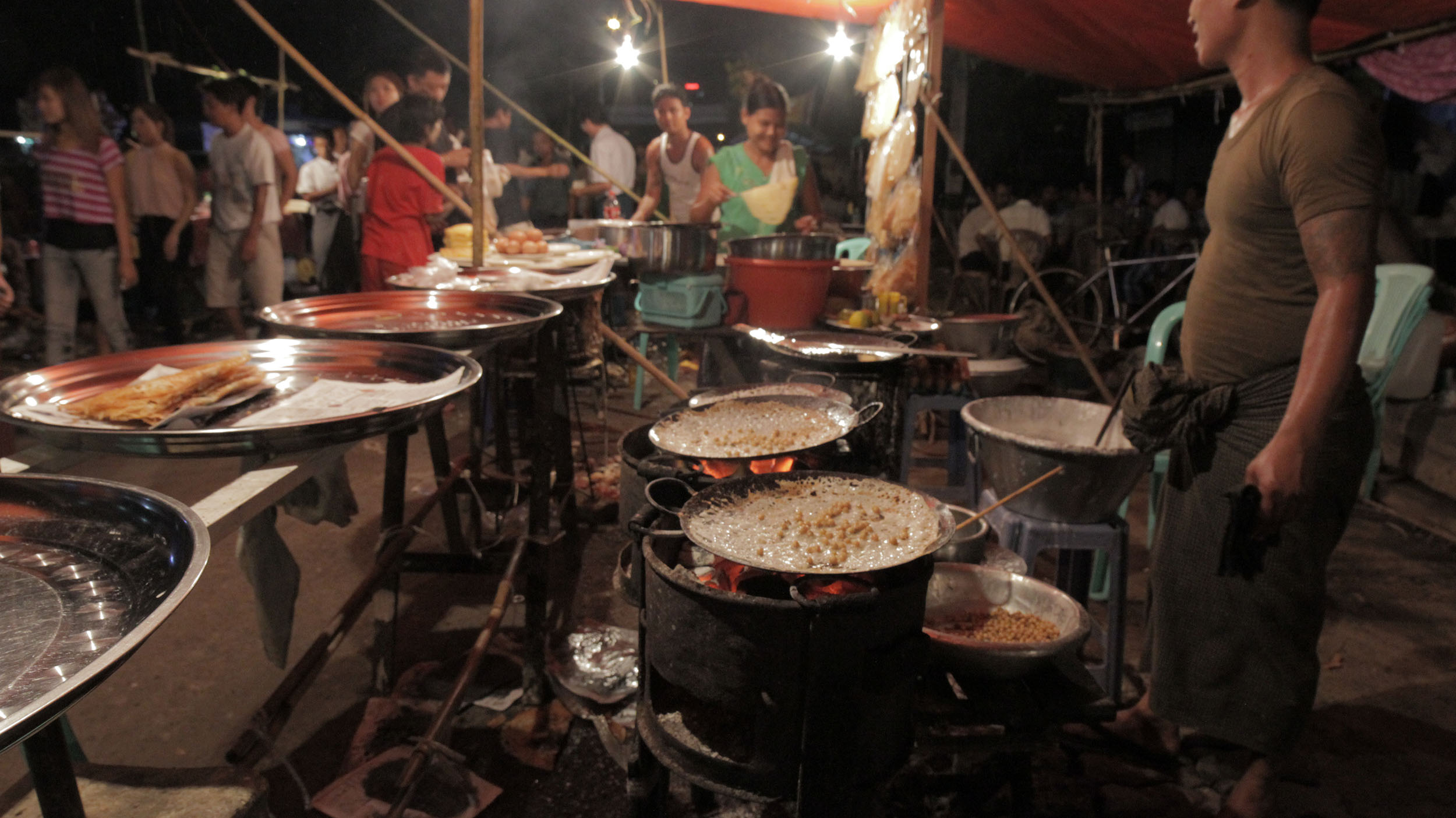
A hawker preparing yay mont.

- Apon (အာပုံ) – Indian-style rice pancakes
- Betha mont (ဘဲသားမုန့်, lit. 'duck meat snack') – curry puff
- Htamane (ထမနဲ) – seasonal delicacy made with glutinous rice, coconut, peanuts, ginger, and sesame
- Khanon htok (ခနုံထုပ်) – stuffed savory crepe
- Mont baing daung (မုန့်ဗိုင်းတောင့်) – steamed rice flour slivers sprinkled with roasted sesame seeds, salt, and coconut shavings
- Mont kya gwet (မုန့်ကြာခွက်) or mont salin daung (မုန့်စလင်းထောင်) – pancake made of rice flour and palm sugar batter
- Mont lay bway (မုန့်လေပွေ) – glutinous rice crisps
- Mont lin maya (မုန့်လင်မယား, lit. 'husband and wife snack')
- Mont oh gin gat (မုန့်အိုးကင်းကပ်) – rice flour griddle cake
- Mont kyo lein (မုန့်ကြိုးလိမ်) – pretzel-like snack made of rice and bean flour
- Nga mont (ငါးမုန့်, lit. 'fish snack') – deep-fried fish crackers
- Yay mont (ရေမုန့်, lit. 'water snack') – paper-thin crisp pancake of rice batter

=== Desserts ===
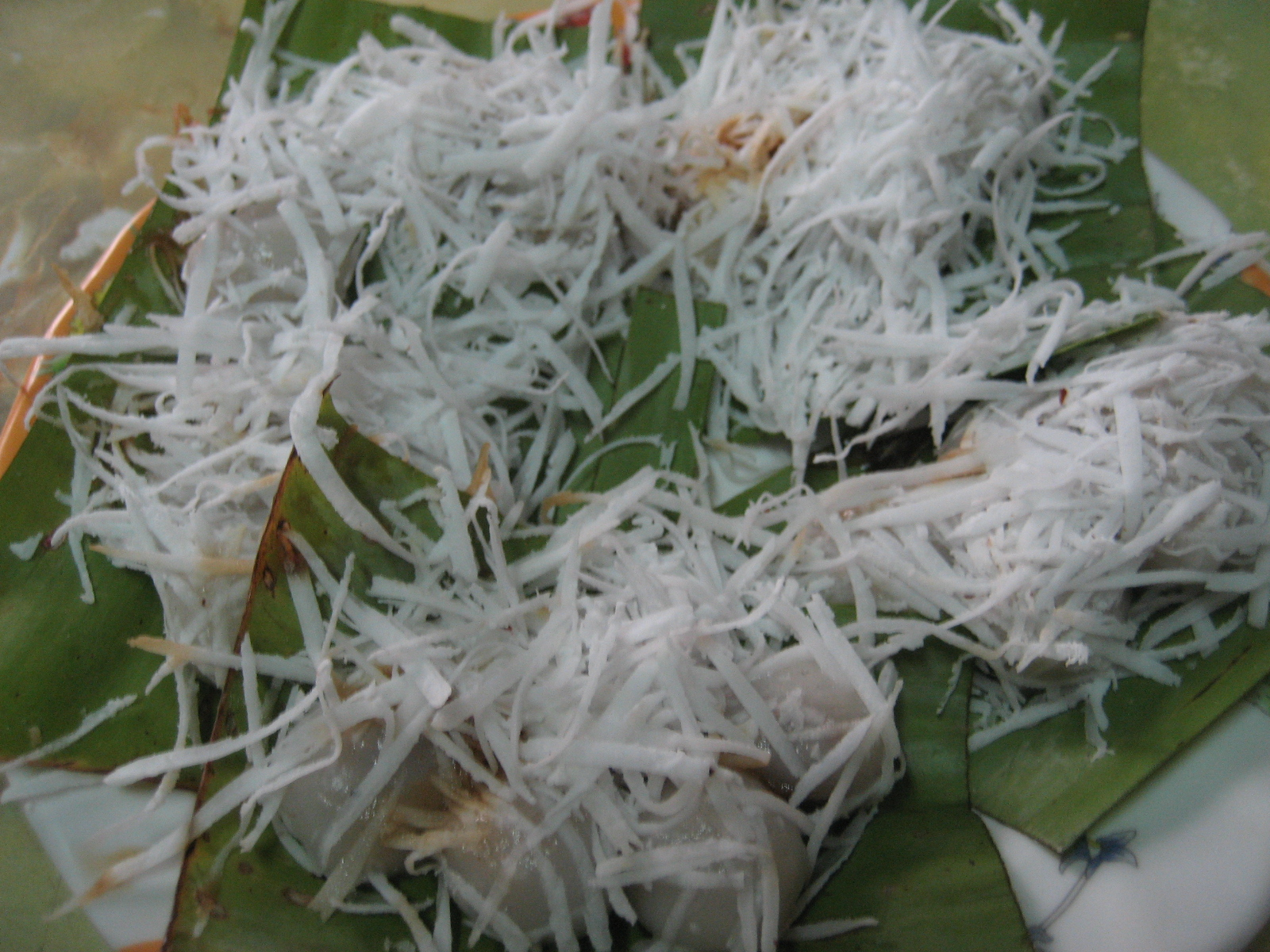
Mont lone yay baw is a traditional Thingyan snack.

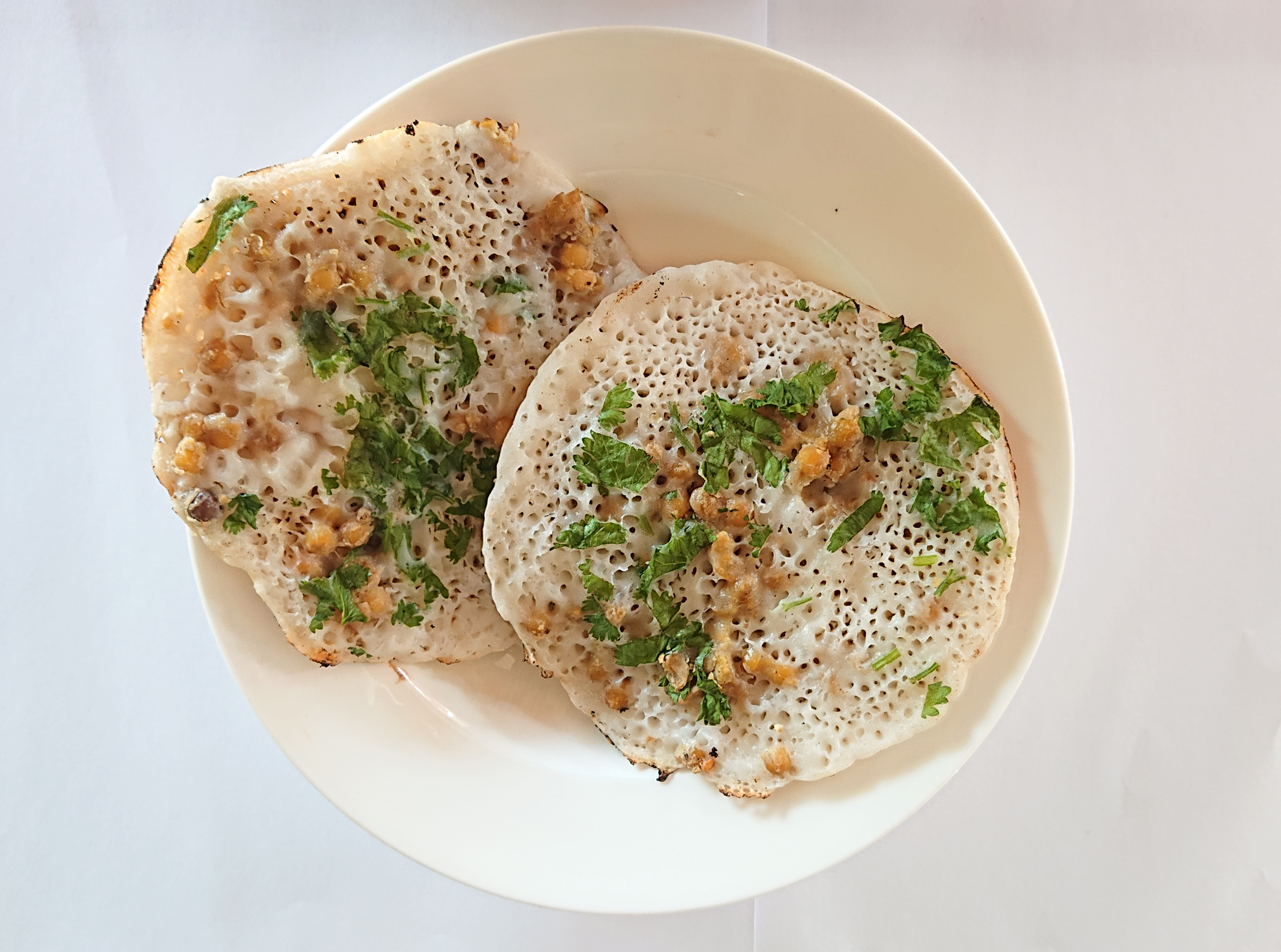
Mont pya thalet, a honeycomb-shaped batter cake.

- Aung Bala (အောင်ဗလမုန့်) – rice pancake topped with syrup
- Bein mont (ဘိန်းမုန့်, lit. 'poppy snack') – pancake made of rice flour, palm sugar, coconut chips, and peanuts, garnished with poppy seeds
- Bi mont (ဘီးမုန့်, lit. 'comb snack') – fried turnover stuffed with a savory filling, similar to an empanada
- Gadut mont (ကတွတ်မုန့်) – an Indian sweetmeat
- Pathein halawa (ပုသိမ်ဟလဝါ) – a regional delicacy from Pathein
- Htanthi mont (ထန်းသီးမုန့်, lit. 'toddy palm snack') – steamed rice cake similar to Chinese fa gao
- Htoe mont (ထိုးမုန့်; lit. 'prodded snack') – pudding made of glutinous rice, sugar, coconut and oil
- Kauk hlaing ti mont (ကောက်လှိုင်းတီမုန့်) – steamed purple rice cakes colored with kauk hlaing ti blossoms
- Kayay kaya mont (ကရေကရာမုန့်)
- Khanon i (ခနုံအီ) – glutinous rice patty with coconut shavings
- Khauk mont (ခေါက်မုန့်; lit. 'folded snack') – folded pancake made with rice flour, palm sugar, and coconut, similar to Thai khanom bueang
- Kyaukkyaw (ကျောက်ကျော) – jelly made with coconut milk
- Malaing mont (မလိုင်မုန့်) – Burmese-style dairy desserts, similar to ras malai
- Masakat (မာစကတ်) – translucent rice pudding similar to Karachi halwa
- Mayway mont (မရွေးမုန့်) – puffed grains of early ripened glutinous rice congealed into a mass with palm sugar syrup, similar to Chinese sachima
- Mont baung (မုန့်ပေါင်း, lit. 'steamed snack') steamed rice cakes, similar to Indonesian putu piring
- Mont gaung ohn (မုန့်ခေါင်းအုံး; lit. 'pillow snack')
- Mont kalama (မုန့်ကလားမ)
- Mont khaw byin (မုန့်ခေါပျဉ်) – steamed glutinous rice cake garnished with coconut shavings
- Kway binka (ကွေပင်ကား) - a steamed golden rice cake similar to the bika ambon, introduced by the Sino-Burmese
- Kway talan (ကွေတာလန်း) - a layered pudding introduced by the Sino-Burmese
- Kway lapaysa or ahtat taya mont (အတပ်တစ်ရာမုန့်) - a multi-layered jelly pudding introduced by the Sino-Burmese
- Mont kya gwet (မုန့်ကြာခွက်; lit. 'lotus cup snack')
- Mont kyazi (မုန့်ကြာစေ့; lit. 'lotus seed snack') or mont peinnèzi (မုန့်ပိန္နဲစေ့; lit. 'jackfruit seed snack') – small balls of boiled glutinous rice in palm sugar syrup
- Mont kyet u (မုန့်ကြက်အူ, lit. 'chicken intestine snack') or mont gyo thwin (မုန့်ချိုသွင်း) – rice flour strings, similar to Indian jalebi
- Mont kywe leit (မုန့်ကြွေလိပ်, lit. 'rolled cowrie snack') – glutinous rice and rice flour snack garnished with sesame seeds, fried garlic, and coconut shavings
- Mont kywe the (မုန့်ကျွဲသည်း, lit. 'buffalo liver snack') – rice flour pudding sweetened with jaggery
- Mont let hsaung (မုန့်လက်ဆောင်း) - Burmese-style cendol
- Mont let kauk (မုန့်လက်ကောက်, lit. 'bracelet snack') – glutinous rice donuts
- Mont lone yay baw (မုန့်လုံးရေပေါ်, lit. 'floating snack balls')
- Mont lone gyi (မုန့်လုံးကြီး; lit. 'big snack balls') – steamed sweet rice dumplings with sweet fillings, similar to Chinese tangyuan
- Mont lone gyi kyaw (မုန့်လုံးကြီးကြော်; lit. 'big fried snack balls') - fried sweet rice dumplings with sweet fillings, similar to Chinese jian dui
- Mont leikpya (မုန့်လိပ်ပြာ; lit. 'butterfly snack') – griddle cake of coarse rice, served with peas or jaggery
- Mont nat (မုန့်နပ်) – fine rice flour mixed with palm sugar boiled into a thick fudge
- Mont onnauk (မုန့်ဦးနှောက်; lit. 'brain snack') – steamed rice flour jelly
- Mont phet htok (မုန့်ဖက်ထုပ်) – steamed sticky rice dumplings, similar to Chinese zongzi
- Mont pya lu (မုန့်ပြာလူး, lit. 'snack rolled in ash') – toasted rice and sugar snack, similar to Filipino espasol
- Mont pya thalet (မုန့်ပျားသလက်) – batter cake shaped like a honeycomb, made of rice flour with or without palm sugar syrup
- Mont pya tu on (မုန့်ပျားတူအုံ) – spongy cake of rice flour and palm sugar batter shaped like a vespiary

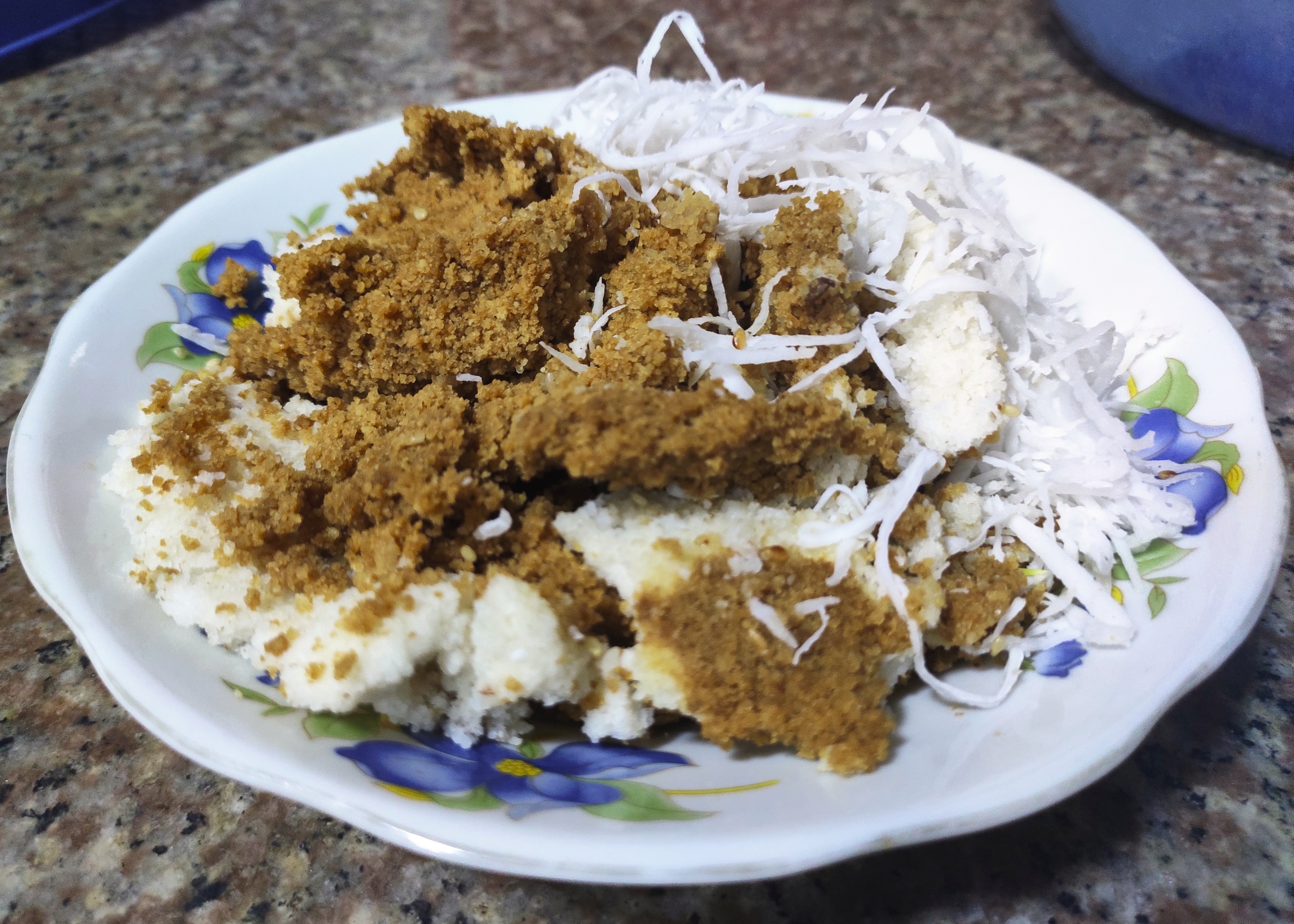
Mont sein baung

- Mont sein baung (မုန့်စိမ်းပေါင်း, lit. 'freshly steamed snack') – steamed rice cake
- Mont thaing gyon (မုန့်သိုင်းခြုံ) – rice flour griddle cake
- Mont hsatthapu (မုန့်ဆပ်သွားဖူး) – griddle cake of rice flour covered with coconut shreds, palm sugar syrup and folded
- Mont hsi gyaw (မုန့်ဆီကြော်; lit. 'oil-fried snack') – fried sweet pancakes made from glutinous rice
- Mont zan (မုန့်ဆန်း) – glutinous rice flakes
- Nankhatai (နံကထိုင်) – Indian shortbread cookies
- Ngwe htamin (ငွေထမင်း; lit. 'silver rice') - steamed glutinous rice baked with coconut milk (also called kaukhnyin shwegyi)
- Onno thagu (အုန်းနို့သာကူ) – sago with coconut milk
- Pashu mont (ပသျှူးမုန့်; lit. 'Malay snack') – confection of roasted glutinous rice flour mixed with sugar and coconut shreds
- Pilawpinan mont (ပီလောပီနံမုန့်, lit. 'Pulau Pinang snack') – a cake made with grated cassava, similar to Filipino cassava cake
- Samai (စမိုင်) - vermicelli in a sweetened milk and cream concoction, similar to Bengali shemai
- Sanwin makin (ဆနွင်းမကင်း) – semolina pudding cake made with sugar, coconut, and butter
- Saw hlaing mont (စောလှိုင်မုန့်) – a baked sweet, made from millet, raisins, coconut and butter
- Salu mont (စလူမုန့်)
- Shwe htamin (ရွှေထမင်း. lit. 'golden rice') – brown glutinous rice cake sweetened with jaggery
- Shwe yin aye (ရွှေရင်အေး; lit. 'cools the golden chest')
- Thagu byin (သာဂူပြင်) – sago pudding sweetened with coconut milk and condensed milk

== See also ==
- Burmese cuisine
- Bánh, a similar class of Vietnamese snacks
- Kue, a similar class of Indonesian snacks
- Kuih, a similar class of Malaysian and Singaporean snacks
- Kakanin, a similar class of Filipino snacks
