= Khanon htok =

Traditional Burmese omelette snack

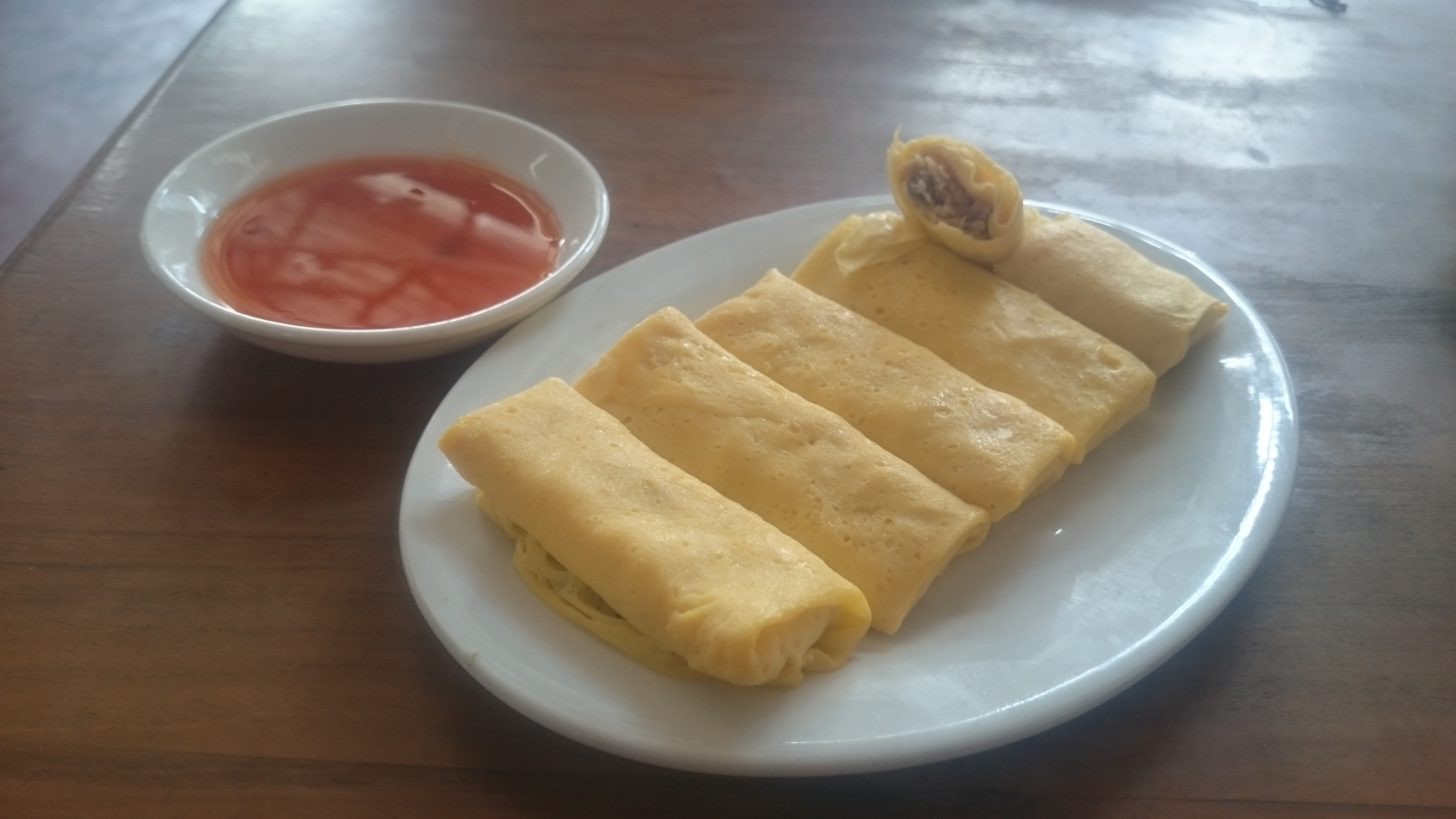
- Type: Snack (mont)
- Place of origin: Myanmar (Burma)
- Region or state: Southeast Asia
- Associated cuisine: Burmese
- Main ingredients: egg, flour, onions, chicken, shrimp

Khanon dok (Burmese: ခနုံထုပ်; pronounced [kʰənòʊɴdoʊʔ]; also spelt khanon htok) is a traditional Burmese snack or mont. The word khanon htok is a portmanteau of Thai khanom (lit. 'dessert') and Burmese htok (lit. 'parcel'). The snack is essentially a stuffed crepe-like omelette filled with sautéed chicken or shrimp, and rolled like an eggroll.

Khanon dok is a popular delicacy in Mandalay, where it was considered a favorite snack of the Mandalay Palace royals during tea time or supper. A series of Burmese–Siamese wars beginning with Hsinbyushin's reign resulted in the emergence of Thai-inspired delicacies, including khanon dok, shwe yin aye, mont let hsaung, and mont di.
