= Shwe htamin =

Burmese golden rice (desert)

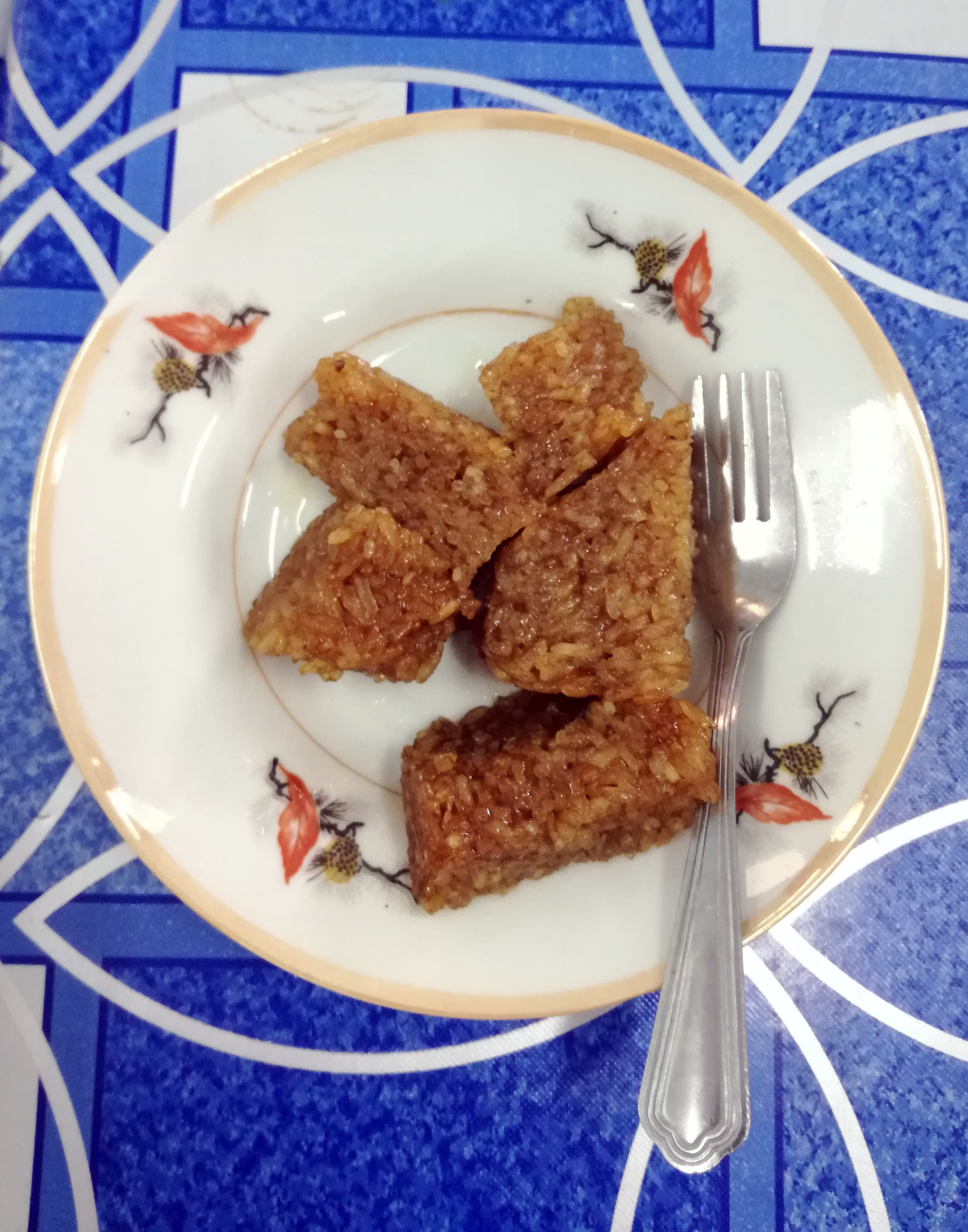
- Type: Dessert (mont)
- Place of origin: Myanmar (Burma)
- Region or state: Southeast Asia
- Associated cuisine: Burmese
- Main ingredients: glutinous rice, jaggery, pandan, coconut shavings
- Similar dishes: Yaksik, biko

Shwe htamin (Burmese: ရွှေထမင်း; pronounced [ʃwè tʰəmɪ́ɴ], lit. 'golden rice') is a traditional Burmese dessert or mont.

The dessert consists of glutinous rice cooked with pandan leaves, coconut milk, and jaggery, and garnished with fresh coconut shavings.
