= Sachima =

Manchurian pastry

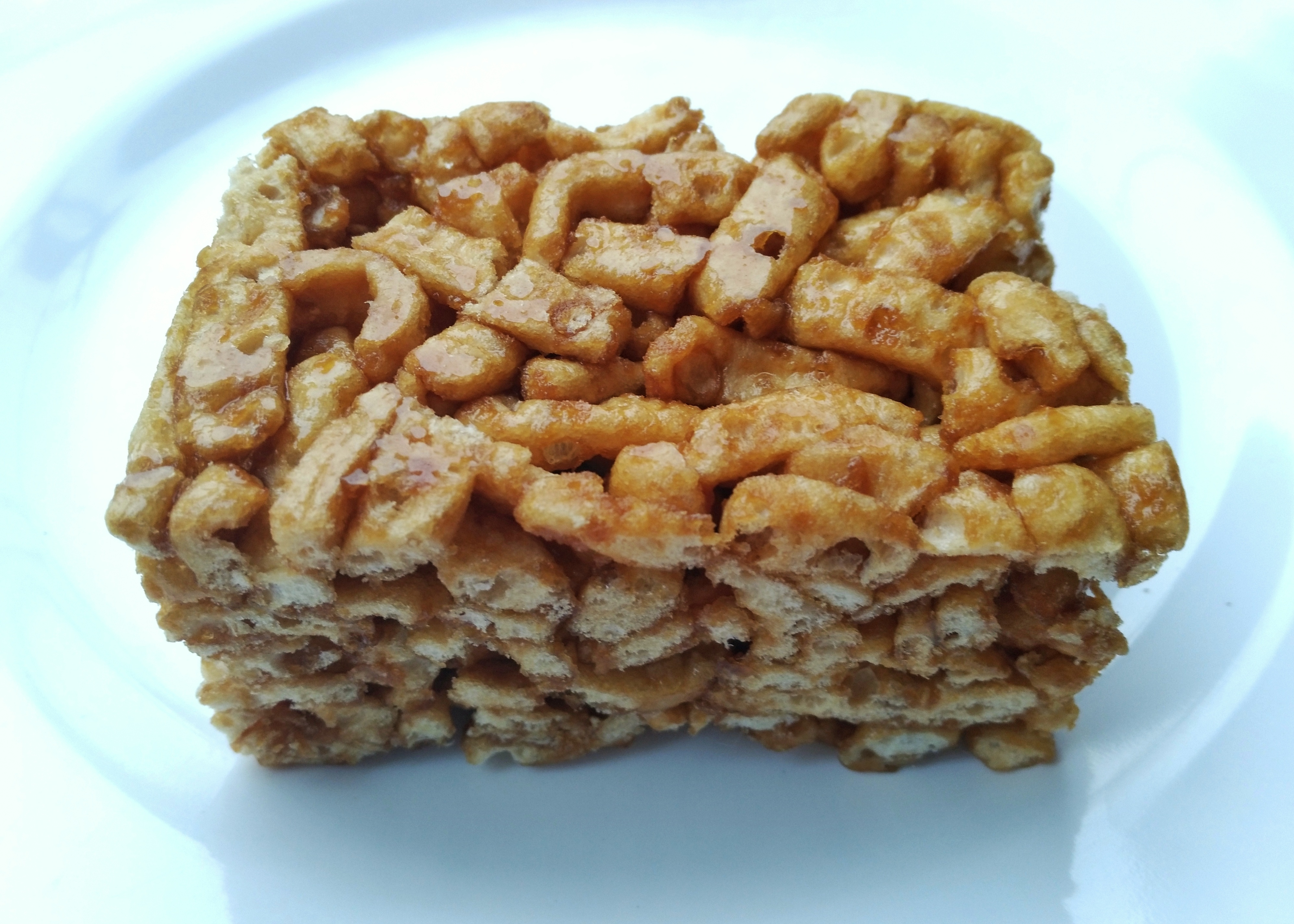
- Sachima
- Alternative names: Shāqímǎ, mǎzǎi
- Type: Pastry
- Place of origin: Manchuria
- Created by: Manchu people
- Main ingredients: Flour, butter, rock sugar
- Variations: by region including raisins, sesame, coconut, etc
- Similar dishes: Mayway mont

Sachima

Chinese name
- Traditional Chinese: 沙琪瑪
- Simplified Chinese: 沙琪玛
- Hanyu Pinyin: shāqímǎ
- Cantonese Yale: sākèimáh
Transcriptions
Standard Mandarin
- Hanyu Pinyin: shāqímǎ
- Bopomofo: ㄕㄚ ㄑㄧˊ ㄇㄚˇ
- IPA: [ʂátɕʰǐmà]
Yue: Cantonese
- Yale Romanization: sākèimáh
- Jyutping: saa1kei4maa5
- Sidney Lau: sa1kei4ma5
- IPA: [sáːkʰȅima̬ː]
Southern Min
- Hokkien POJ: soa-kî-má

Alternative Chinese name
- Traditional Chinese: 薩其馬
- Simplified Chinese: 萨其马
- Hanyu Pinyin: sàqímǎ
- Cantonese Yale: saatkèimáh
Transcriptions
Standard Mandarin
- Hanyu Pinyin: sàqímǎ
- Bopomofo: ㄙㄚˋ ㄑㄧˊ ㄇㄚˇ
- IPA: [sâtɕʰǐmà]
Yue: Cantonese
- Yale Romanization: saatkèimáh
- Jyutping: saat3kei4maa5
- Sidney Lau: saat3kei4ma5
- IPA: [sāːt̚kʰȅima̬ː]
Southern Min
- Hokkien POJ: sat-kî-má

Second alternative Chinese name
- Traditional Chinese: 馬仔
- Simplified Chinese: 马仔
- Hanyu Pinyin: mǎzǎi
- Cantonese Yale: máhjái
Transcriptions
Standard Mandarin
- Hanyu Pinyin: mǎzǎi
- Bopomofo: ㄇㄚˇ ㄗㄞˇ
- IPA: [màtsàɪ]
Yue: Cantonese
- Yale Romanization: máhjái
- Jyutping: maa5zai2
- Sidney Lau: ma5jai2
- IPA: [ma̬ːtsɐ̌i]
Southern Min
- Hokkien POJ: má-á

Manchu name
- Manchu script: ᠰᠠᠴᡳᠮᠠ
- Abkai: saqima
- Möllendorff: sacima

Sachima (simplified Chinese: 沙琪玛; traditional Chinese: 沙琪瑪; pinyin: Shāqímǎ) is a sweet snack originating in Chinese cuisine made of fluffy strands of deep-fried batter bound together with a stiff sugar syrup. It originated in Manchuria and is now popular throughout China. It can be found in Taiwan as well as in overseas Chinese communities, most notably in Malaysia and Singapore. Its decoration and flavor vary across different regional Chinese cuisines, but the appearance of all versions is essentially the same. Its appearance has been compared to that of a Rice Krispies Treat, although sachima is far older.

== Etymology ==
Sachima comes from Manchu word sacima, which is in turn a modification of the word sacimbi, meaning cut; the affix -mbi was replaced with the affix -ma.

== History ==
Historical documents show that sachima was popular in the Qing dynasty, in keeping with the preference for sweet, sticky, or wheat-based snacks favored by Manchu cuisine at the time. The spread of sachima across different regions of China can be viewed as part of the Manchu-Han cultural exchange facilitated by the Qing court.

== Regional variations/Similar Foods ==
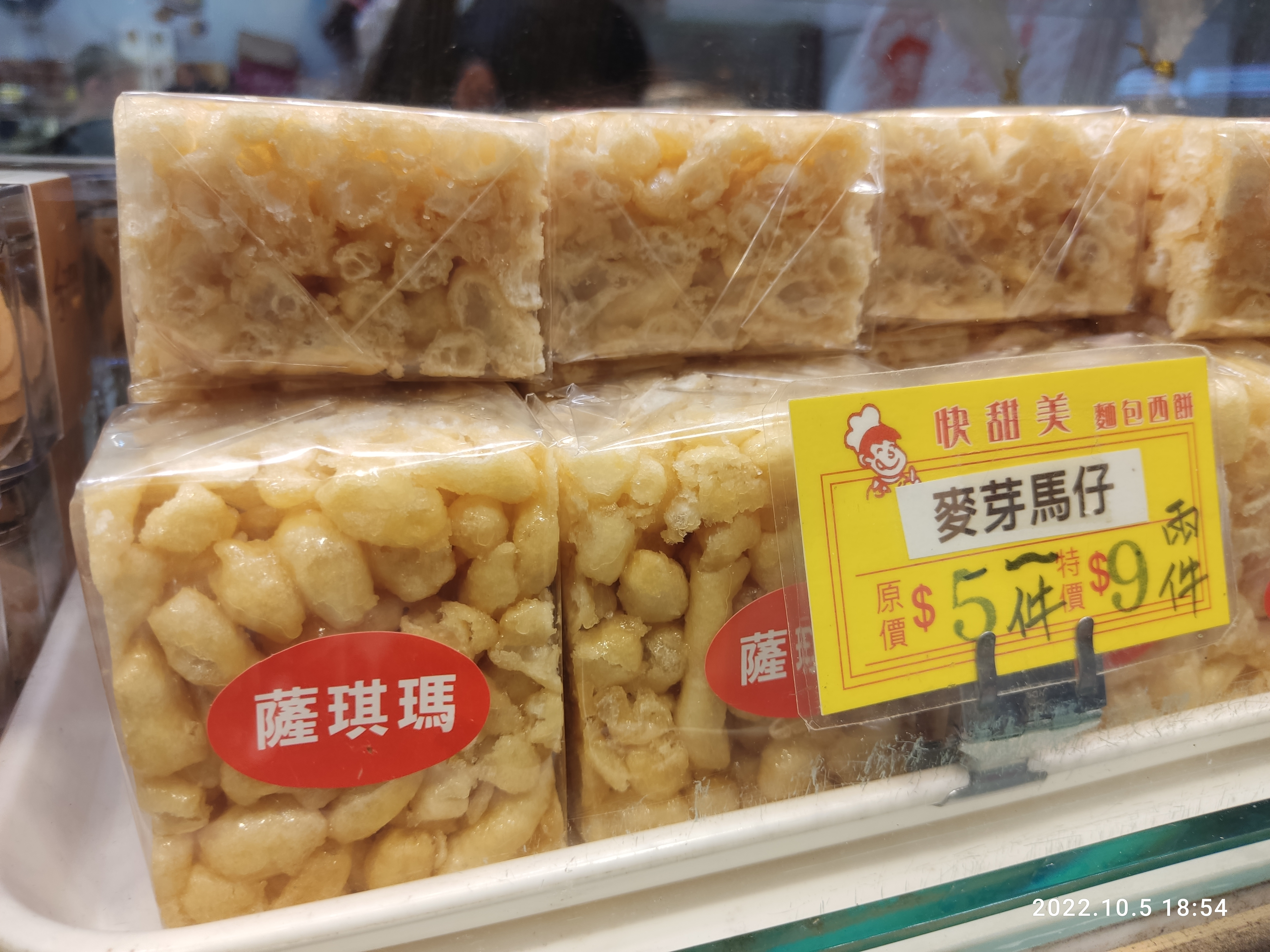
Sachima sold in Hong Kong

=== Manchu ===
Originally, in Manchu cuisine sachima is a sweet snack. It mainly consists of flour, butter, and rock sugar. It is now popular in mainland China among children and adults.

=== Cantonese ===
The Cantonese pastry version of sachima is slightly sweet. It is also made of essentially the same ingredients as the other varieties of sachima. However, it is often sprinkled with sesame seeds, raisins or dried coconut. The Cantonese variety of sachima ranges from chewy to crunchy in texture.

=== Fujian ===
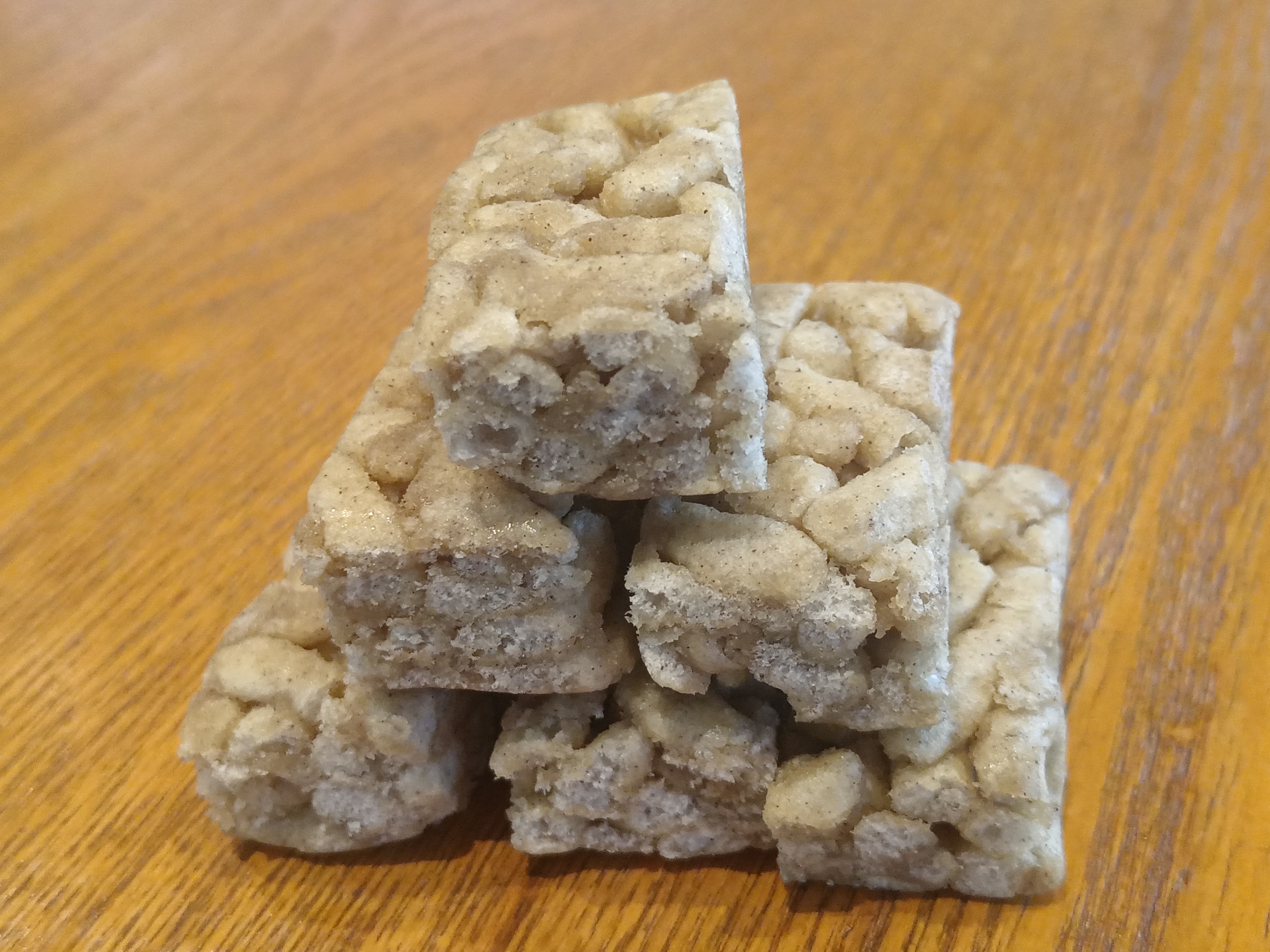

Many of the Fujian distribution companies manufacture packaged versions of sachima. This version has sesame and is made of wheat flour, vegetable oil, egg, milk, granular sugar, and malt sugar. The taste is comparatively plain compared to the more sweetened Cantonese version.

=== Mauritius ===
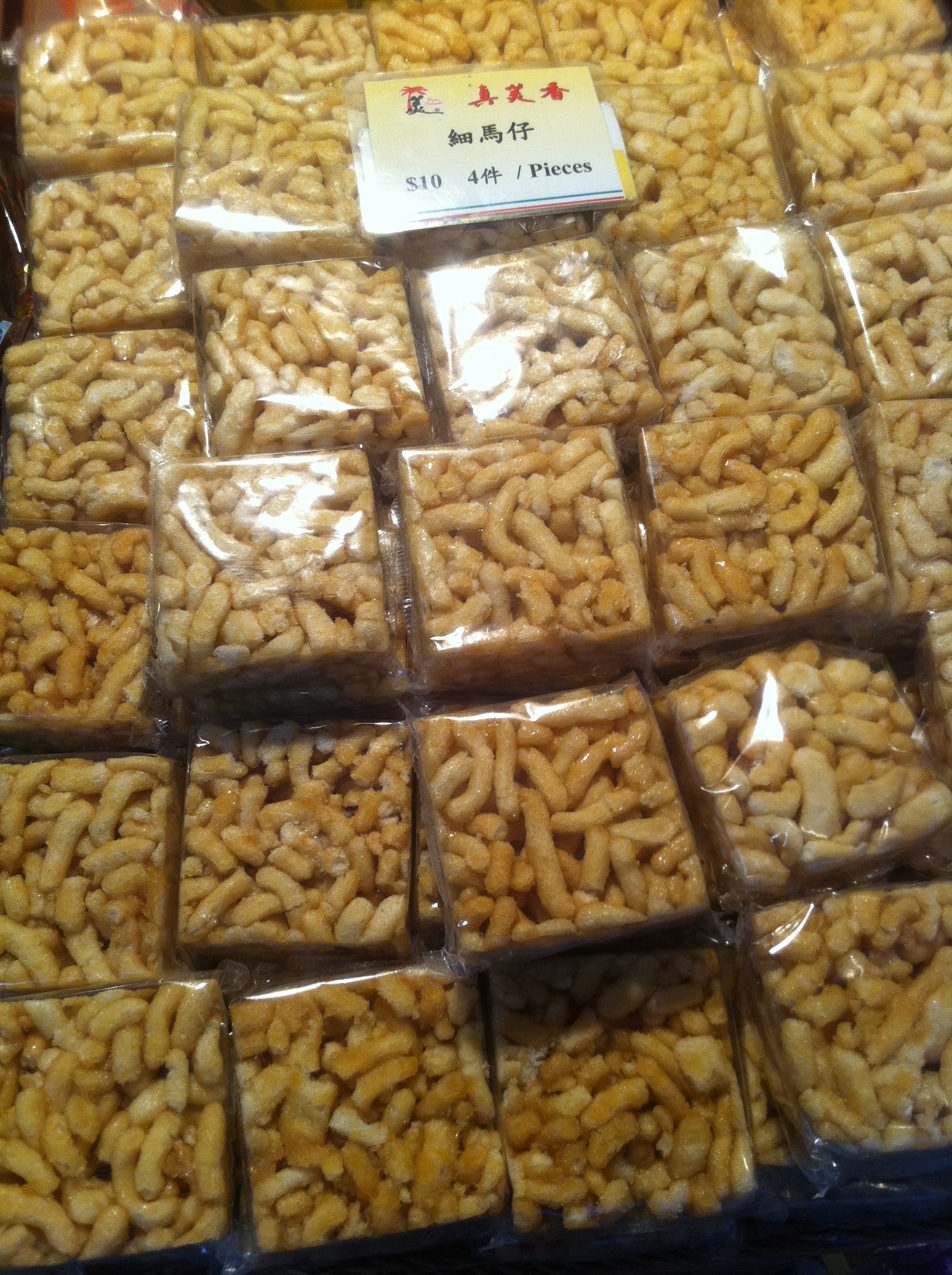

In Mauritius, sachima is called "gâteau macaroni" (lit. "macaroni cake"). It is a traditional Chinese cake sold and eaten by Sino-Mauritians.

=== Myanmar (Burma) ===
A similar dish called mayway mont (မရွေးမုန့်), consisting of puffed grains of early ripened glutinous rice congealed into a mass with jaggery syrup, is a popular traditional Burmese snack or mont.

=== Vietnam ===
A similar dish called bánh bỏng gạo or khẩu sli consisting of puffed grains of early ripened glutinous rice congealed into a mass, along with sugar, ginger, and sometimes peanut, is a traditional dessert of the Tay and Giay people. It is also popular in the northern provinces of Lai Chau, Cao Bang, Bac Giang.

=== Korea ===
A similar dish called oranda (오란다) consisting of puffed grains such as pumpkin seeds and black sesame seeds, stuck together and sweetened with natural sugars like rice syrup and malt syrup, can be found in Korea. It is a popular gift for important events such as weddings, birthday parties, Seollal and Chuseok. Oranda has a softer texture than many sachima variations.

== See also ==
- Çäkçäk
- Funnel cake
- Yeot-gangjeong
- List of Chinese desserts
- Rengginang
