= Yaksik =

Korean spiced and mixed rice dish

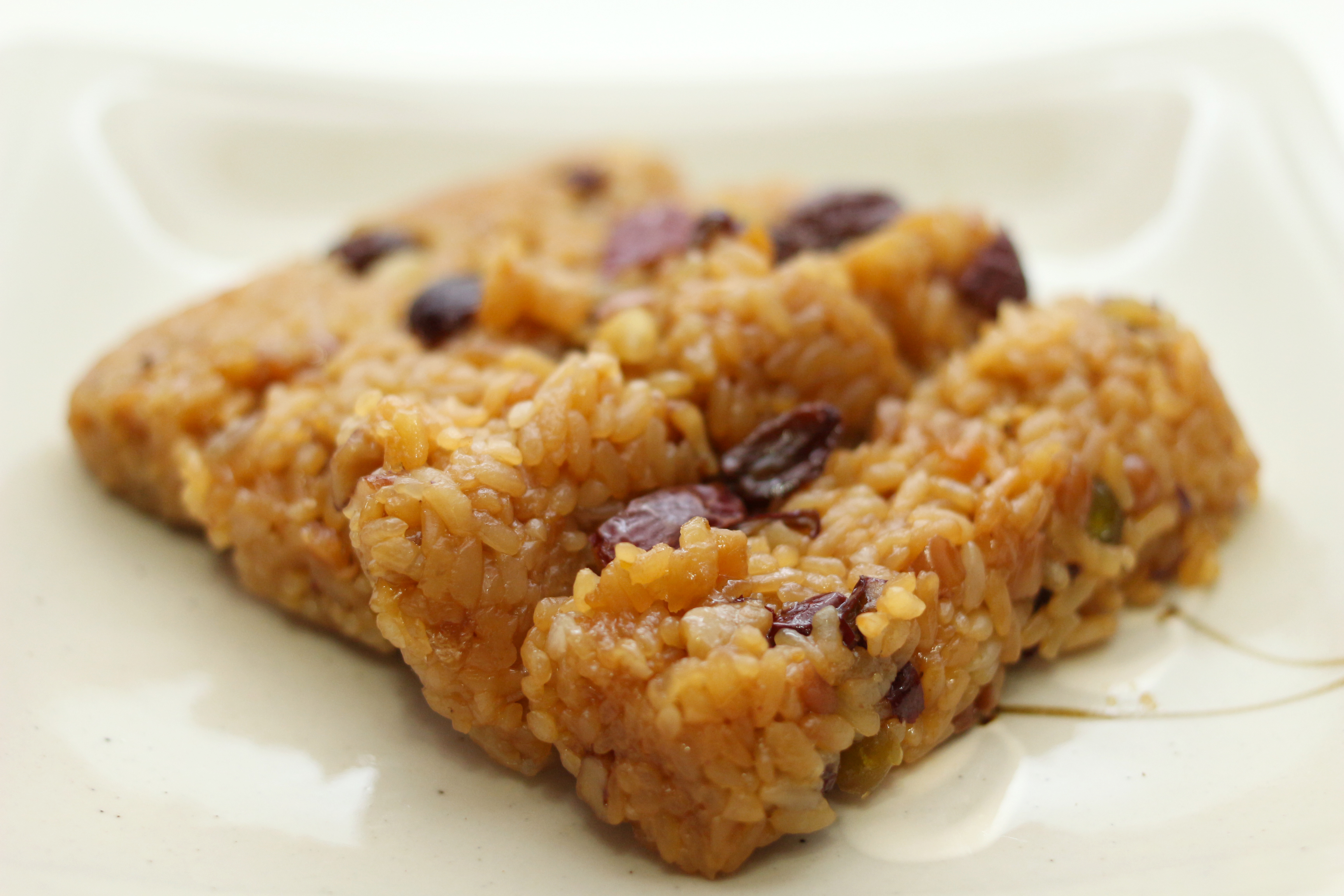
- Alternative names: Yakbap
- Place of origin: Korea
- Region or state: Korean-speaking areas
- Main ingredients: glutinous rice, chestnuts, jujubes, and pine nut
- Similar dishes: Shwe htamin, biko
- Other information: Typically consumed during Jeongwol Daeboreum, weddings and hwangap festivities

Korean name
- Hangul: 약식; 약밥
- Hanja: 藥食; 藥밥
- RR: yaksik; yakbap
- MR: yaksik; yakpap

Yaksik (Korean: 약식; lit. 'medicine food') or yakbap (약밥; lit. 'medicine rice') is a sweet Korean dish made by steaming glutinous rice, and mixing with chestnuts, jujubes, and pine nuts. It is seasoned with honey or brown sugar, sesame oil, soy sauce, and sometimes cinnamon. It is traditionally eaten on Jeongwol Daeboreum (정월대보름), a Korean holiday which falls on the 15th day of the 1st month of the Korean calendar (lunisolar), but also for weddings and hwangap festivities.

== Etymology ==
Yaksik got its name due to the use of honey in its ingredients. In the etymology book A-eon Gakbi (아언각비; 雅言覺非) written in early 19th century Joseon, it is noted that honey was commonly called yak "medicine". For instance, honey buckwheat wine was called yakju (약주), honey rice was called yakban (약반, an old word for yaksik), and fried cakes sweetened with honey were called yakgwa (약과).

== History ==
Records of yaksik can be found in the historical text Samguk yusa, written in the 13th century. According to the legend titled Sageumgap (사금갑), King Soji, the 21st ruler of Silla, was headed to Cheoncheonjeong (a pavilion on Namsan in what is now Seoul's Jung District) on the 15th day of the first lunar month in the 10th year of his reign (488 CE) when a crow and mouse alerted him of danger. The mouse spoke to King Soji in his native language and told him to follow the crow. The King of Silla ordered a servant to follow the crow, which led him to a pond. It was here that an old man arose from the pond and handed the servant an envelope. Written on the envelope was "Two people will die if you open this. If you don't open it, only one person will die." After being informed by his servant that the envelope was in direct reference to the king, the King of Silla opened it. Inside was a letter which read, "Go back to the palace and shoot an arrow into the box that holds a six-stringed zither". The King of Silla complied and, when he shot an arrow into the box, he discovered a monk and concubine waiting to assassinate him (Korean recipes: Sweet rice with nuts and jujubes, yaksik (약식), 2016).

The King saved himself from a potential revolt thanks to the crow's warning and the 15th of the first lunar month was designated a day of remembrance thereafter. Originally, this day was known as Ogiil (from Chinese: 烏忌日, lit. '"crow memorial day"'). During the commemorative rites, glutinous rice was offered to crows as a way to give thanks for saving the King of Silla's life. This was the origin of yaksik. Although there are many variations of this legend passed on through the South Korean people (such as a tale referencing the Suh family), the legend of Sageumgap is the best known version. The addition of pine nuts, chestnuts, jujubes, honey, and oil became customary during the Goryeo era.

Yaksik is also mentioned in various books from the Joseon period such as Dongguksesigi (Record of Seasonal Customs in Korea) (동국세시기), Yeolyang Seisigi (열양세시기), Donggukyeojiseungram (동국여지승람). In Yeolyang Seisigi, it is said that envoys to China shared yaksik with the people in Yeonkyung, and most enjoyed the dish. It is also said that Hŏ Kyun a politician, poet, scholar and writer annotated in his book Tomundaejak that the Chinese people loved yakban; known to them as Goryeoban. From the Gyuhap Chongseo, (규합총, Women's Encyclopedia, 1809) Although this dish was shared with neighboring China, the consumption of yaksik on the first lunar month is a traditional custom specific to Korea.

== Cooking ==
Glutinous rice is steamed and mixed with honey, brown sugar, and ganjang to color and flavor the rice. Soft-boiled chestnuts, pine nuts, sesame oil and quartered jujubes with the seeds removed are added and the resulting mixture is resteamed. The yaksik is then put into desired shapes such as flat squares and left to cool before eating. Over time, South Koreans have developed more modernized ways of cooking yaksik such as utilizing a rice pressure cooker. Yaksik is typically eaten at room temperature and can be kept in cooler conditions for a few days. For longer periods of storing, it should be kept in the refrigerator or freezer.

== See also ==
- Namul
- Songpyeon
