= Biko (food) =

Sweet rice cake from the Philippines

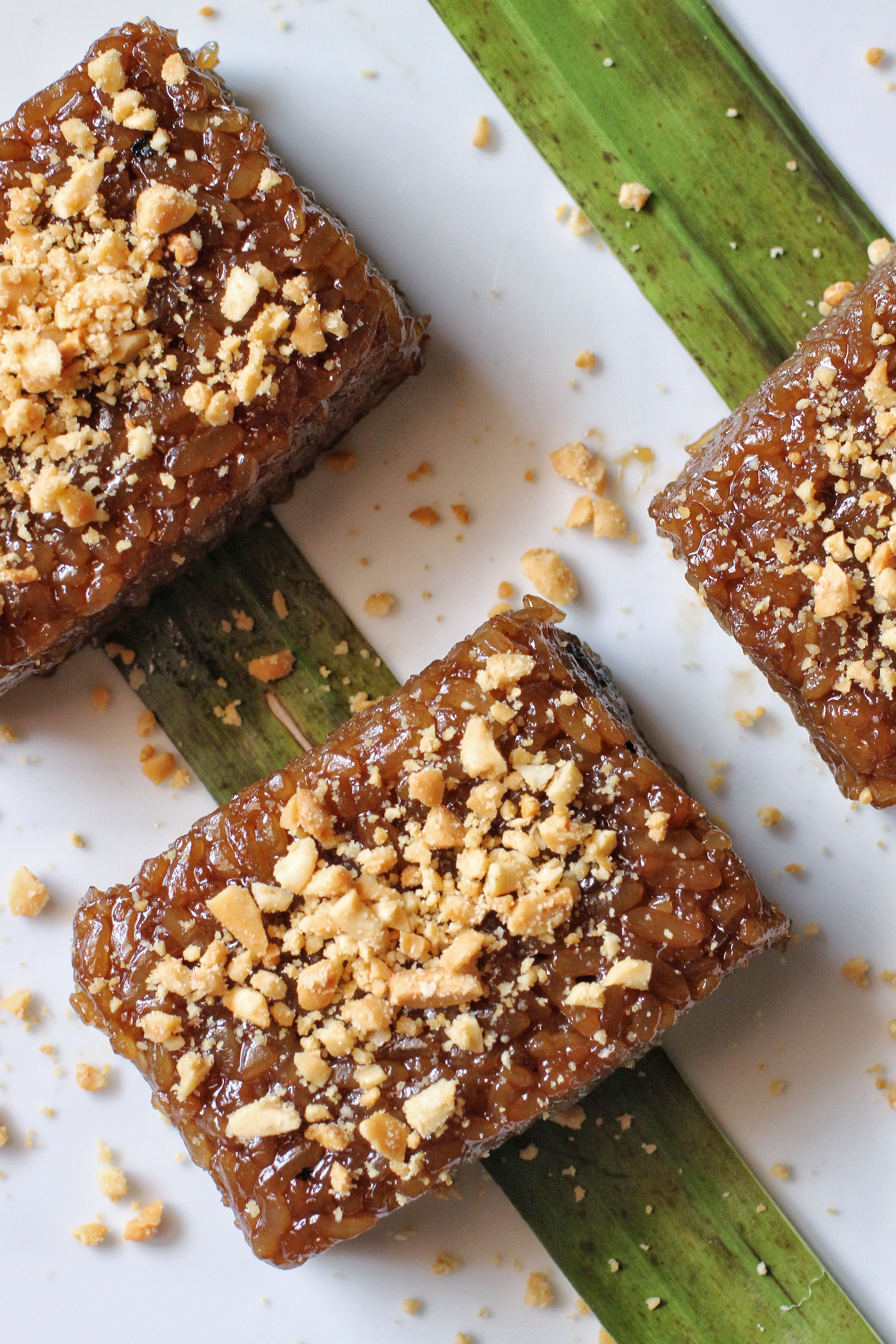
- Cubed biko topped with latik (coconut curds)
- Alternative names: Inkiwar, Sinukmani, Sinukmaneng, Sumang Inilonggo, Wadjit, Wadit, Wagit
- Course: merienda, Snack
- Place of origin: Philippines
- Serving temperature: Warm, room temperature
- Main ingredients: Glutinous rice, brown sugar, coconut milk
- Variations: See Kalamay
- Similar dishes: Yaksik, shwe htamin

Biko, also spelled bico, is a sweet rice cake from the Philippines. It is made of coconut milk, brown sugar, and sticky rice. It is usually topped with latik (either or both the coconut curds or the syrupy caramel-like variant). It is a type of kalamay dish and is prepared similarly, except the rice grains are not ground into a paste. They are also sometimes packaged and sold as suman.

It is also known as inkiwar in Ilocano Northern Luzon and sinukmani or sinukmaneng in the Southern Luzon area. In the Muslim regions of the Philippines, it is known as wadjit in Tausug; wadit in Maranao; and wagit in Maguindanao.

A notable variant is puto maya in Cebuano-speaking regions of the Philippines. It is usually made from purple glutinous rice (called tapol) soaked in water, drained and then placed into a steamer for 30 minutes. This rice mixture is then combined with coconut milk, salt, sugar and ginger juice and returned to the steamer for another 25 to 30 minutes. It is traditionally served as small patties and eaten very early in the morning with sikwate (hot chocolate). It is also commonly paired with ripe mangoes. Puto maya is characteristically al dente, compared to the mushier texture of biko.

Biko can also be prepared with other common Filipino ingredients. Examples include ube-biko which is made with ube (mashed purple yam), and pandan biko which is made with pandan leaf extracts; these are characteristically deep purple and bright green, respectively.

== See also ==
- Espasol
- Kakanin
- Latik
- Suman
