= Bein mont =

Traditional Burmese snack

- Type: Snack (mont)
- Place of origin: Myanmar (Burma)
- Region or state: Southeast Asia
- Associated cuisine: Burmese
- Main ingredients: rice flour, jaggery, coconut shavings
- Ingredients generally used: sesame seeds, peanuts and poppy seeds
- Similar dishes: Pancake

Bein mont (Burmese: ဘိန်းမုန့်; pronounced [béɪɴmo̰ʊɴ], lit. 'poppy cake') is a Burmese pancake, widely available as a street food. It is a traditional Burmese snack, part of a broader family of dishes known as mont. The pancake batter is rice flour based. After cooking the pancakes are immersed in jaggery syrup with coconut shavings and garnished with sesame seeds, peanuts and poppy seeds, hence the name.
