= Cendol =

Asian cold sweet dessert

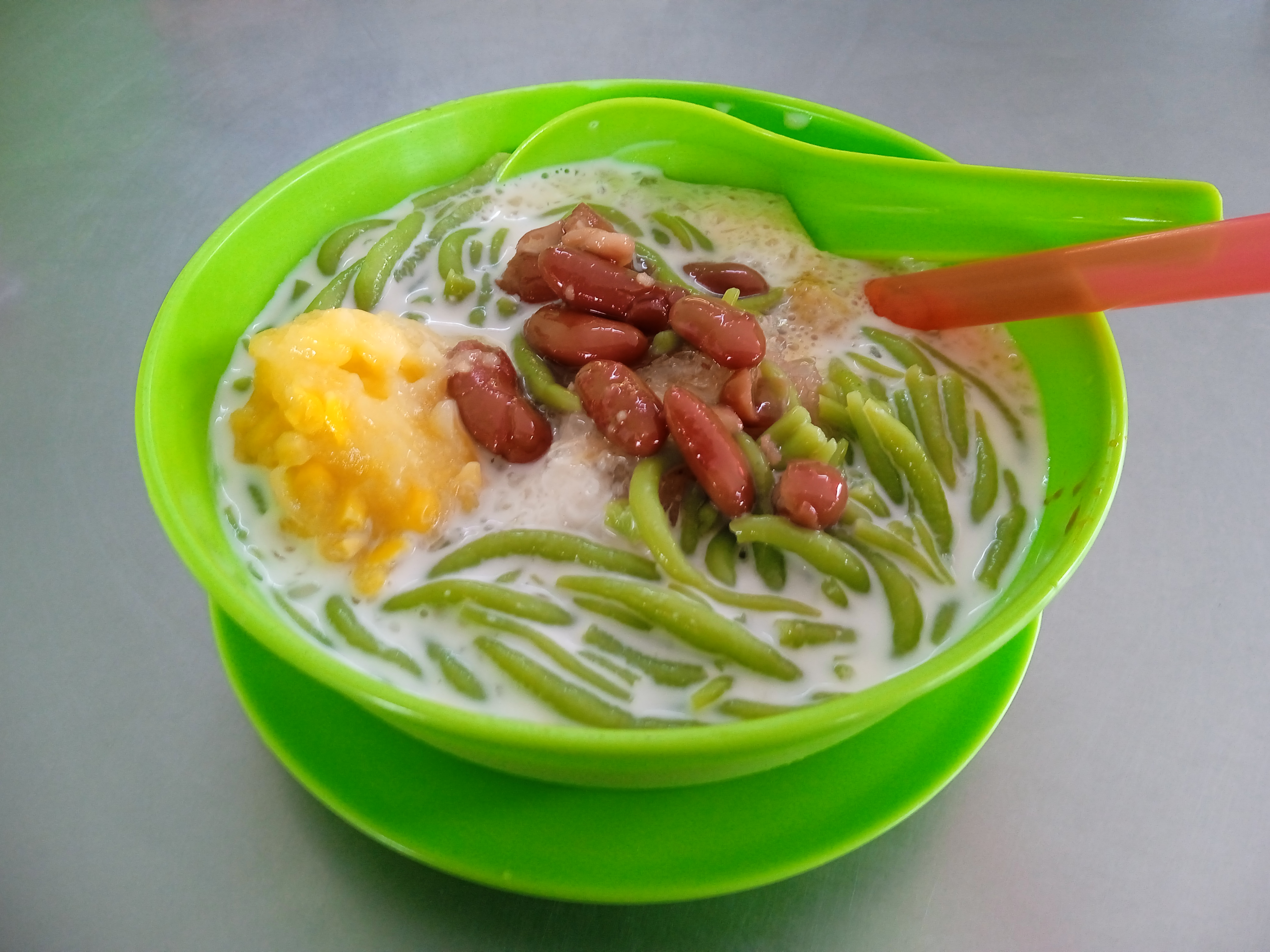
- Bowl of cendol in Selangor, Malaysia
- Alternative names: បង្អែមលត (bang-aem lot) (Cambodia); chè bánh lọt (Vietnam); chendol (Singapore); cindolo (South Sulawesi, Indonesia); cindua (West Sumatra, Indonesia); dawet (Central and East Java, Indonesia); es cendol (West Java, Indonesia)
- Type: Dessert
- Place of origin: Southeast Asia
- Associated cuisine: Brunei, Cambodia, Indonesia, Laos, Malaysia, Myanmar, Singapore, Thailand, Vietnam
- Main ingredients: Coconut milk, rice flour jelly with pandan juice, shaved ice, palm sugar

Cendol, also known as lot chong (Thai: ลอดช่อง), mont let saung (Burmese: မုန့်လက်ဆောင်း), nom lut (Khmer: បង្អែមលត), lod song (Lao: ລອດຊ່ອງ) and bánh lọt, is a traditional Southeast Asian dessert characterised by soft, green, worm-like jelly strands made from rice flour or mung bean starch, coconut milk and palm sugar syrup, typically served over shaved ice. The jelly is flavoured with pandan and combined with a creamy coconut milk base and the caramel-like sweetness of palm sugar. It is widely consumed in Brunei, Cambodia, Indonesia, Malaysia, Laos, Myanmar, Singapore, Thailand and Vietnam, and forms an established component of Southeast Asian food culture, commonly sold by vendors at roadsides, hawker centres and food courts.

The dessert has a long and complex history reflected in regional variations that incorporate local ingredients and culinary techniques. Additional toppings may include diced jackfruit, sweetened red azuki beans or durian. Although most commonly green, it also appears in other colours, and savoury and fried variants exist. It is served during festivals, religious observances and traditional ceremonies across Southeast Asia.

== History ==
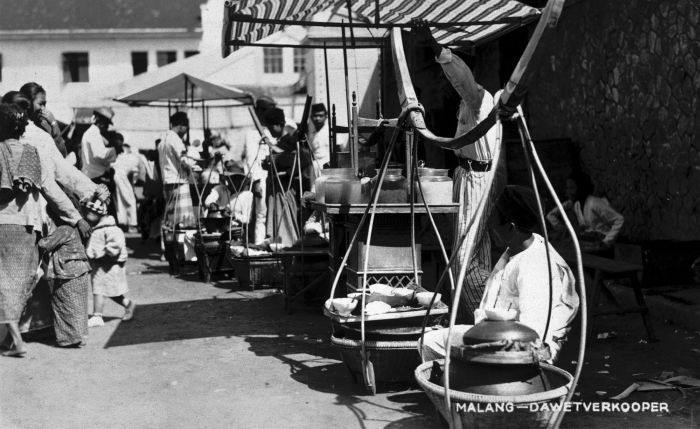
A dawet seller with his jars of ingredients, at a market in Malang, East Java (ca.1935)

=== Early Southeast Asian Culinary Traditions ===
Known variously across Southeast Asia as cendol, lot chong, bánh lọt, mont let saung and nom lut, this jelly-based dessert has a long and complex history with multiple interpretations regarding its origins. Its basic components, including rice or tapioca flour, coconut milk, palm sugar and pandan, are longstanding features of indigenous Southeast Asian food traditions. Rice flour has been used for centuries across both island and mainland societies to produce steamed cakes, porridges and jellies, while coconut milk and palm sugar provide richness and sweetness. Pandan (Pandanus amaryllifolius) has long been employed as both an aromatic and colouring agent. These ingredients and preparation techniques predate European colonial influence and were widely established across the region prior to the emergence of modern national boundaries.

This deep-rooted ingredient base is reflected in the dessert’s broad geographic distribution across both mainland and maritime Southeast Asia. Related forms are documented among Vietnamese, Khmer, Thai and Bamar communities on the mainland and among Javanese, Sundanese, Malay, Minangkabau and Bugis populations in the archipelagic region, supporting interpretation of its development as part of a shared regional culinary heritage rather than attribution to a single ethnic or geographic origin.

Some Thai sources suggest that an earlier form of lot chong, known as nokploi, formed part of Indian-influenced culinary rituals, reflecting the influence of Hindu and Brahmanical food and ritual traditions in Southeast Asia. Historical evidence of Thai nokploi, typically served with coconut milk, dates back to the reign of King Narai (approximately 1672–1688 CE), when a typical household dessert set included four types of sweets, known as the “four-cup dessert set.

Other culinary experts link cendol to the Persian dessert faloodeh, which was adapted in India as falooda before spreading to Southeast Asia. In Indonesia, cendol is closely associated with the Javanese beverage dawet, documented for several centuries. References in the twelfth-century manuscript Kakawin Kresnayana indicate that sweet rice-flour drinks resembling cendol were known in the Kediri Kingdom of East Java. Some sources also suggest a Hakka Chinese connection, with bánh lọt potentially originating among Hakka communities and brought by migrants to maritime Southeast Asia, where it became a popular rice-based sweet beverage in tropical climates.

=== Names, Etymology and Early Documentation ===
In Indochina, similar rice flour jelly desserts are known by various local names. In Vietnam, the worm-like rice flour strands are called bánh lọt, meaning “secreted jellies”, and are a common ingredient in the dessert drink chè. In Thailand, the dessert is known as lot chong (Thai: ลอดช่อง, pronounced [lɔ̂ːt t͡ɕʰɔ̂ŋ]), which can be translated as “gone through a hole”, referring to the method of pressing warm dough through a sieve into cold water. In Burma, it is called mont let saung (မုန့်လက်ဆောင်း). In Cambodia, variants include lot (លត /lɔːt/), bang-aem lot (បង្អែមលត /bɑŋʔaɛm lɔːt/), nom lot (នំលត /nɷm lɔːt/), and banh lot (បាញ់លត /baɲ lɔːt/), while in Laos it is known as lod song (ລອດຊ່ອງ). The Vietnamese term lọt is cognate with the Proto-Katuic reconstruction lɔɔt, meaning “to pass” or “go by”, which is reflected in related languages such as Pacoh (luat).

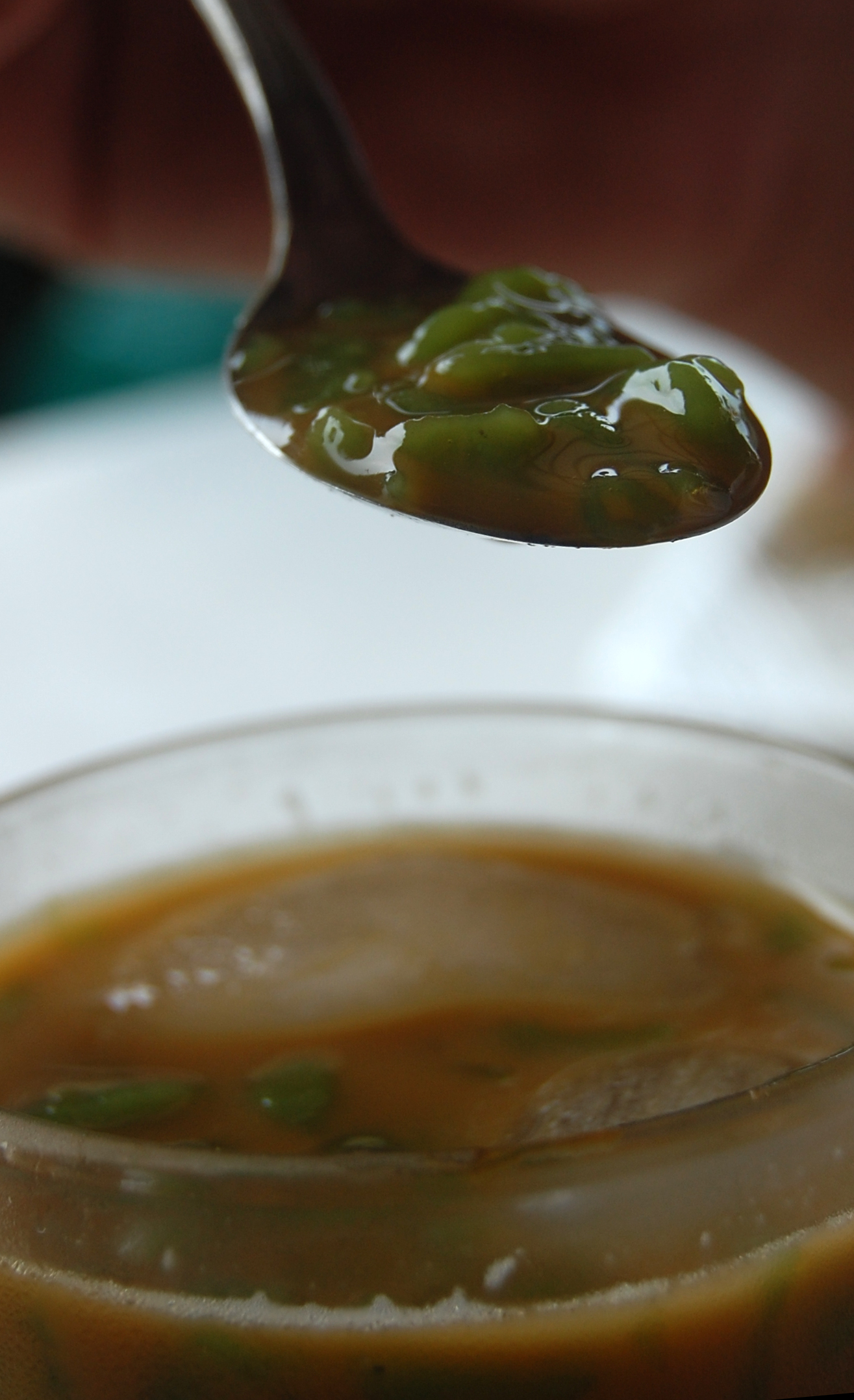
Close-up of cendol, showing green rice-flour jelly strands in a spoon.

In most of Maritime Southeast Asia, the dessert is commonly called cendol. Linguistic sources suggest that the name derives from the word jendol, meaning “bump”, “bulge”, or “swollen” in Malay, Indonesian, Javanese and Sundanese, in reference to the characteristic green worm-like rice flour strands. In most parts of Indonesia, cendol refers to the green rice flour jelly, while the full preparation of jelly combined with coconut milk, shaved ice, palm sugar and sometimes diced jackfruit is known as es cendol in West Java or dawet in Central and East Java. Other regional names include cindua (Minangkabau, West Sumatra) and cindolo (Bugis, South Sulawesi).

The earliest known written records referring to cendol (spelled “tjendol” in old Dutch orthography) date to the mid-nineteenth century in the Dutch East Indies. One of the oldest documented references appears in the 1859 Makassarese–Dutch dictionary. On page 391, the entry describes “tjêndoló” or “tjêndoloka” as a type of local delicacy made either from rice or sago flour, cooked into a porridge, then pressed through a bamboo frame with small holes to form small granules. These granules were then mixed with coconut milk and consumed with syrup. An editorial note later in the volume (page 934, under “Corrections and Additions”) specifies that “het Mal tjendol” (“the Malay cendol”) should be added after the term “tjêndoloka,” indicating that the word cendol was recognised as a Malay term in the regional linguistic context.

The term “tjendol” continued to appear in nineteenth-century Dutch colonial dictionaries and cookbooks from the Dutch East Indies. A notable example is the 1866 Oost-Indisch kookboek (East Indies Cookbook), which includes a recipe titled “Tjendol of Dawet,” reflecting that cendol and dawet were already regarded as interchangeable terms at that time. Further lexical documentation appears in Jan Pijnappel’s 1869 Supplement op het Maleisch-Nederduitsch Woordenboek (Supplement to the Malay–Dutch Dictionary), where tjendol is described as a drink or semi-liquid preparation made from sago, coconut milk, sugar, and salt. Together, these nineteenth-century sources demonstrate that cendol was already a well-established preparation in the Malay–Indonesian world, recognised in both culinary practice and formal linguistic records.

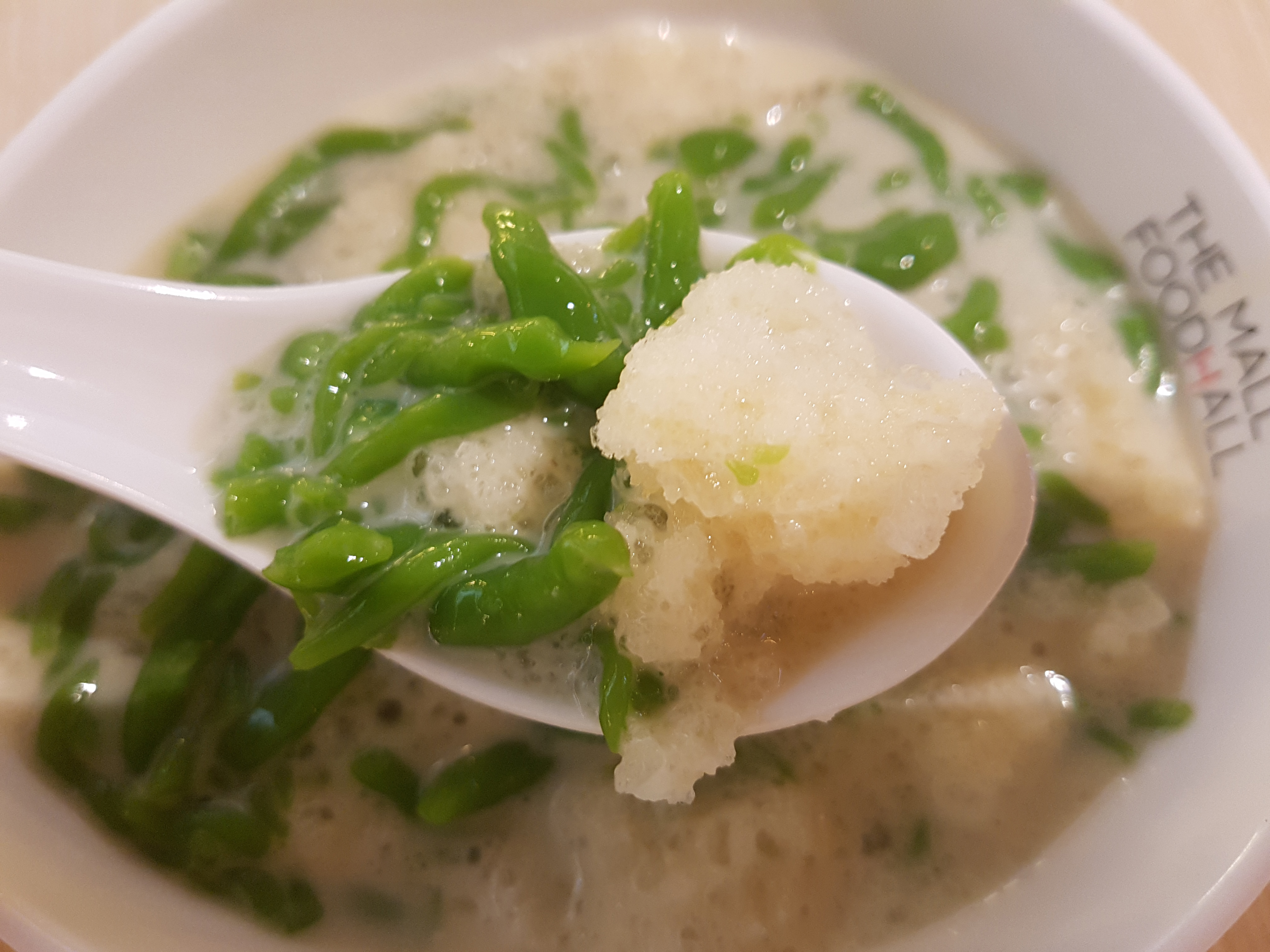
A bowl of lot chong sold in Bangkok, Thailand.

In Malaya, the term “chendul” was recorded as early as 1894 in a Malay-English dictionary compiled by British administrators Hugh Clifford and Frank Swettenham in Taiping, Perak. It was defined as a liquid preparation made from cooked sago passed through a sieve and mixed with coconut milk, salt and sugar. By 1932, chendol appeared among the foodstuffs available in Kuala Lumpur, as documented in the Malay Concordance Project.

In Thailand, lod chong has a long history and even features religious symbolism. The oldest known Thai recipe, found in Tamra Kap Khao Phiset by Mae Ob Chao Ka, second edition 1927, describes the dessert Narai Banthom Sin green pandan lod chong, as representing Vishnu resting in the cosmic ocean. The recipe instructs the pandan-flavoured dough to be pressed through a wide wooden mold into water, forming the strands characteristic of lod chong, demonstrating the integration of Hindu cosmology into Thai culinary traditions.

== Culinary characteristics ==
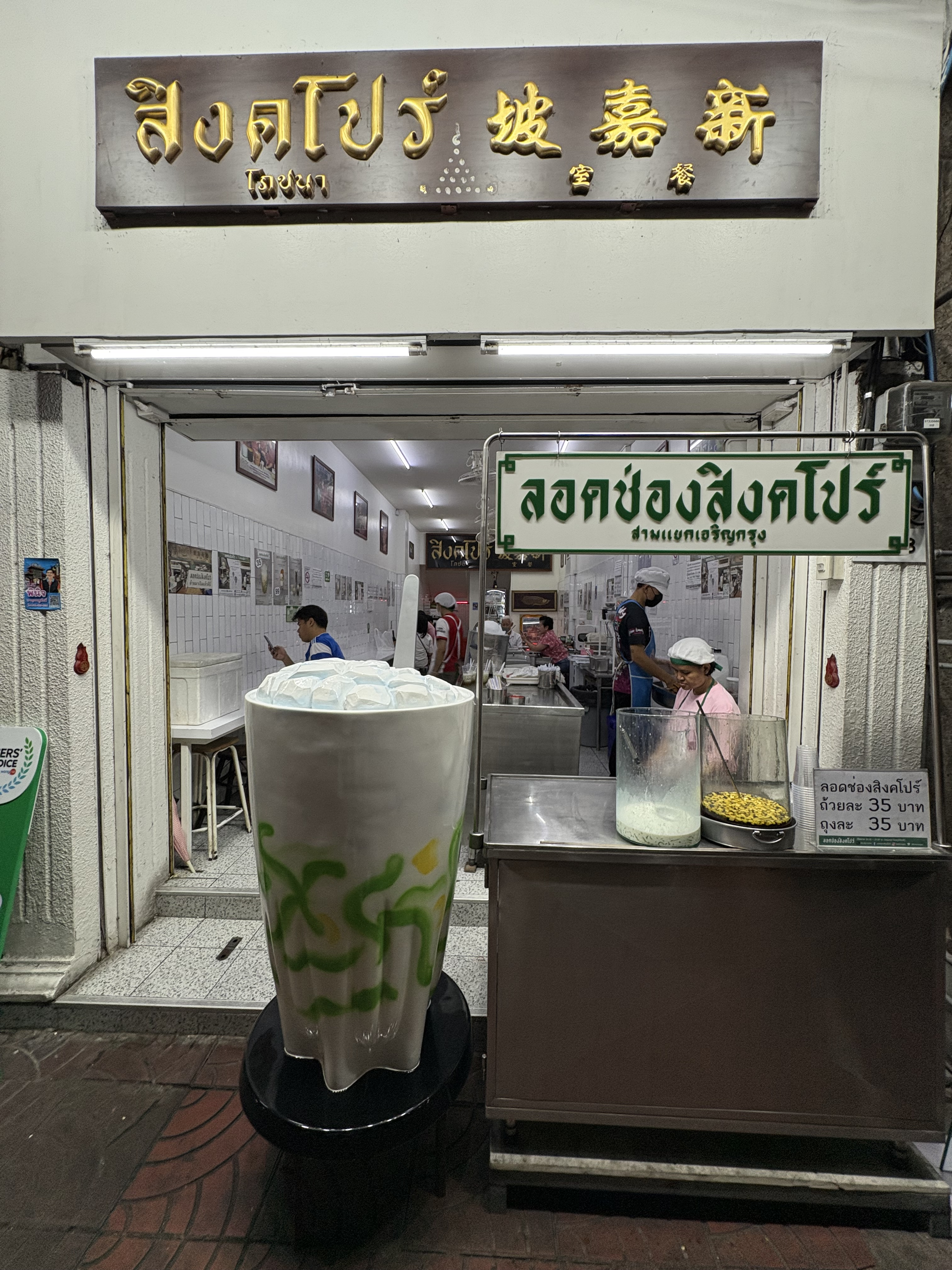
A giant replica of a glass of lot chong at Singkhapo Photchana (Singapore Pochana), a restaurant linked to the development of the Thai dessert lot chong Singapore

=== Thailand ===
In parts of the Indochinese region, local adaptations of the dessert emerged within the broader Southeast Asian culinary framework. In Thailand, lot chong (Thai: ลอดช่อง), has long been embedded in cultural and social life. In the late 17th century, it was included in the traditional “four-cup dessert set,” a selection of sweets commonly prepared in households alongside puffed rice dessert, basil seed dessert and sticky rice. Historically, the dessert was called Nok Ploy, a name thought to reference either the process of pressing the dough into strands, which resembled the excretion of a bird, or symbolically, the freeing of the dough like a bird being released. The modern name lot chong, meaning “passing through a hole,” reflects the preparation method of pressing dough through small holes into water to form the dessert’s characteristic strands.

In addition to its culinary history, lot chong became part of Thai social life and urban culture. In the early to mid-20th century, a version known as “Singapore lod chong” became popular around cinema districts in Bangkok, particularly near Yaowarat’s Singapore Pochana restaurant.

One notable version is found in Phetchaburi, where lot chong is served with sweetened coconut milk and locally produced palm sugar, which is poured over the dish at the end rather than mixed into the coconut milk, producing a distinct caramel-like flavour.

=== Vietnam ===
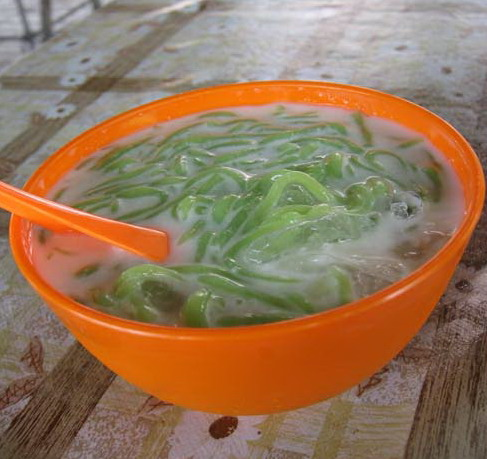
Chè bánh lọt (translates to “fallen cake dessert”) is a classic Southern Vietnamese dessert.

In southern Vietnam, particularly in the Mekong Delta, bánh lọt has long formed part of local food traditions, where it is believed to have originated as a simple countryside snack. Early preparations were typically sweet and served with coconut milk, reflecting the region’s abundance of rice and coconut. Over time, the dish spread to urban centres, including Ho Chi Minh City, where it became more widely consumed across different social and economic settings.

Chè bánh lọt (“fallen cake dessert”), is commonly sold by street vendors and dessert stalls in southern Vietnam. It typically consists of green bánh lọt strands and sweetened coconut milk. The dish is closely associated with urban food culture in Ho Chi Minh City and the Mekong Delta and is commonly consumed as a cooling dessert during warm weather and festive or market occasions.

As bánh lọt entered urban food culture, it diversified into numerous forms. In addition to sweet versions, it was adapted into savoury dishes, including stir-fried preparations with eggs and vegetables, noodle soups served with pork or shrimp, and mixed dishes combining the strands with plain white noodles. This versatility allowed bánh lọt to move beyond its original role as a dessert and become incorporated into everyday meals. From the south, it gradually reached central and northern Vietnam, although it remained less common in the north and was often regarded as a specialised or regional sweet.

The development of bánh lọt also reflects Chinese culinary influence, particularly from Cantonese and Hakka traditions. Within southern Vietnamese communities, the dish has been correlated with Chinese-descended groups, and related names appear in Chinese dialects, such as mi kim bac in Hong Kong, banh mat ray in Cantonese, and mi ti chuot in Hakka, which describe its shape and preparation. Chinese migrants are often credited with introducing techniques for pressing rice dough into thin strands, which were subsequently adapted using local ingredients and flavour profiles. Over time, Vietnamese cooks further expanded these influences, producing a wide range of sweet, savoury, and dry preparations that contributed to bánh lọt’s popularity in southern Vietnamese cuisine.

=== Myanmar ===
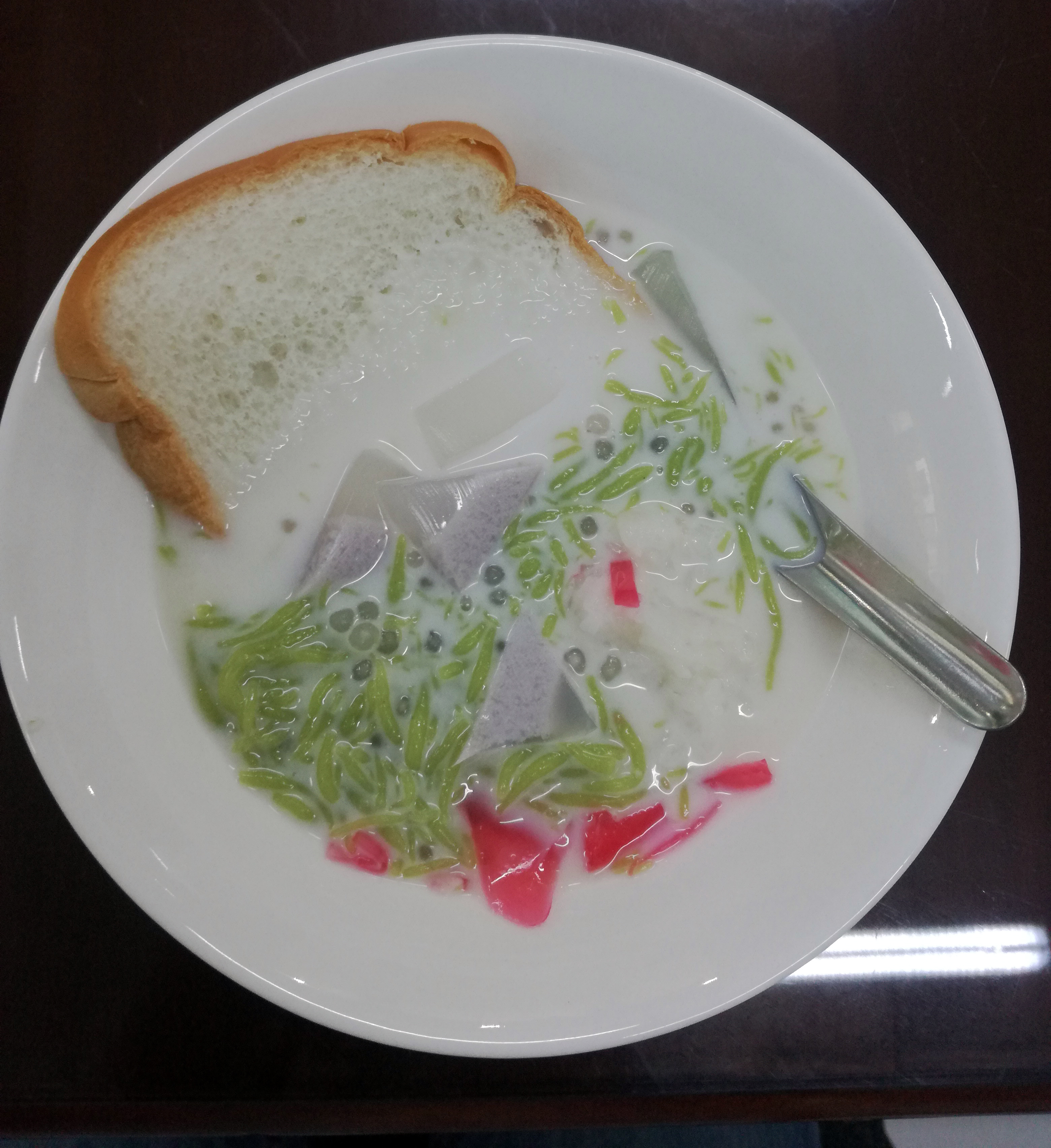
A bowl of Burmese Shwe Yin Aye, typically made with sweetened sticky rice, sago pearls, pandan jelly noodles (mont let saung), cubes of gelatine and coconut jelly, and a slice of white bread in sweetened coconut milk, served cold.

In Myanmar, mont let saung is a traditional dessert that developed within the country’s indigenous sweet-making culture. It consists of soft rice flour jelly served in sweetened coconut milk or palm jaggery syrup and is commonly prepared in two forms: a pandan-flavoured version, noted for its light fragrance and subtle herbal notes, and a richer coconut milk variation that is creamier and mildly aromatic. The dessert was introduced from Thailand (Ayutthaya Kingdom) and gradually adapted to local tastes, becoming a common snack throughout the country.

Mont let saung is strongly associated with Thingyan, the Myanmar New Year Water Festival, where it is often prepared and distributed by satuditha donors to revellers. Mont let saung also appears as an ingredient in the Burmese dessert shwe yin aye, reflecting the integration of this rice jelly-based preparation into multi-ingredient sweet dishes and its role in festive and communal culinary traditions.

=== Cambodia ===
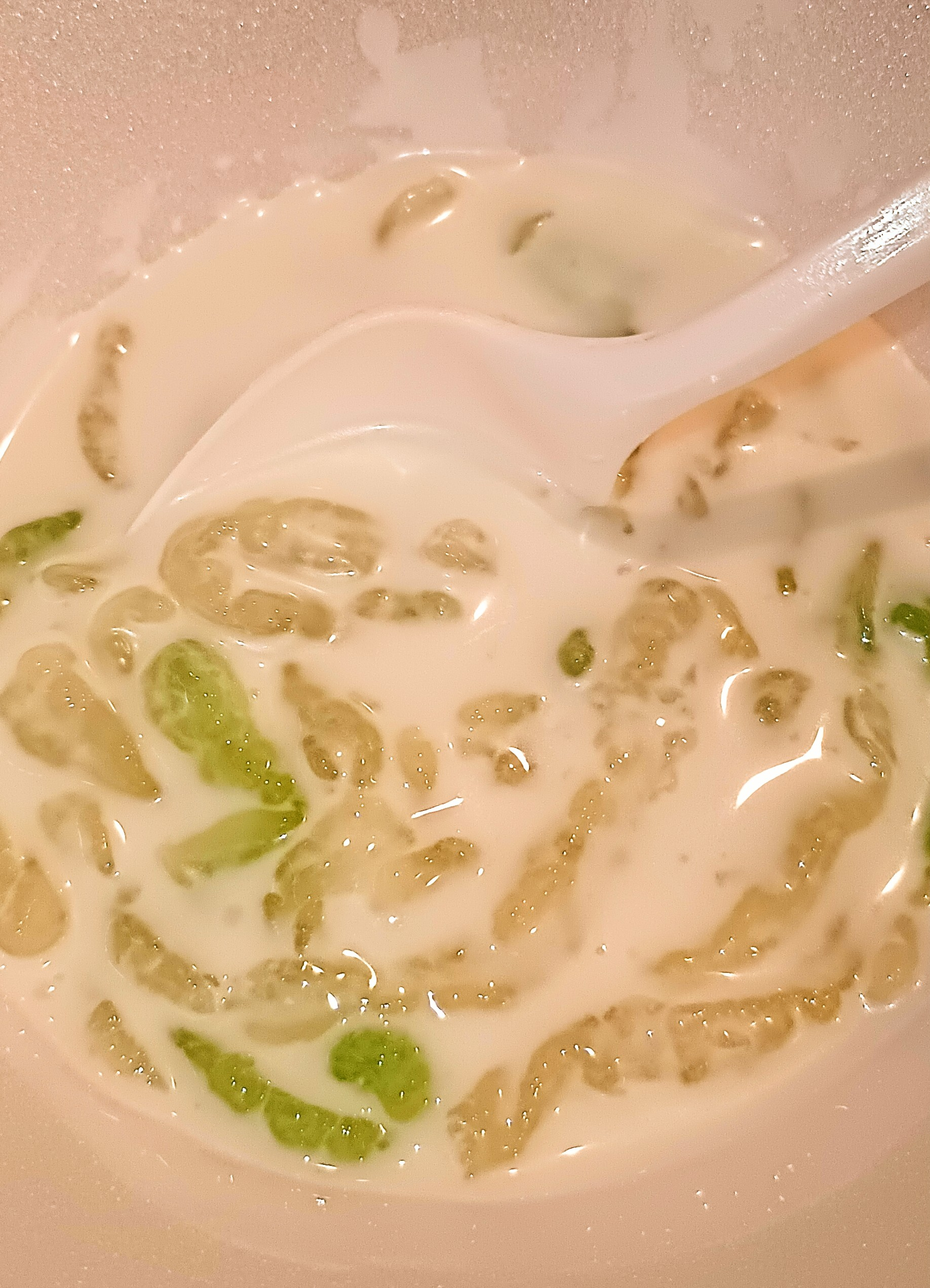
Cambodian nom lut.

In Cambodia, nom lut is a traditional Cambodian dessert consisting of pandan jelly strands served in sweetened coconut milk.

=== Indonesia ===
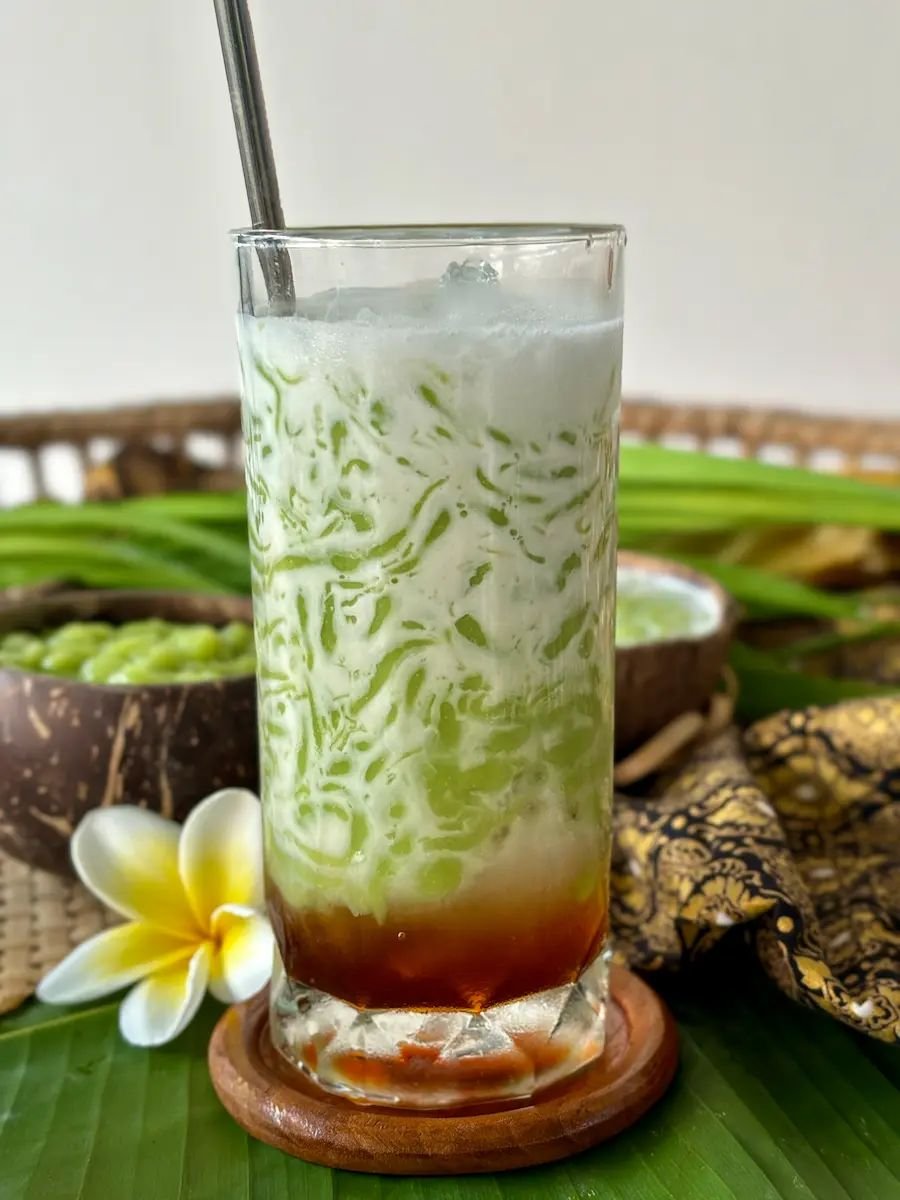
Cendol served in a glass, a popular sweet drink in Indonesia.

In Indonesia, a closely related variant known as dawet developed primarily within Javanese culinary traditions. Dawet is typically prepared from rice flour jelly served with coconut milk and palm sugar syrup. Early references to drinks resembling dawet appear in Javanese literary sources such as the Kresnayana, which reflects aspects of cultural life during the Kediri period and suggests that sweet, coconut-based beverages were enjoyed both in courtly circles and among local communities. Local tradition records dawet in Ponorogo as early as the 10th century, with renewed prominence in the 15th century during the administration of Bupati Bathara Katong, who is said to have popularised the drink and introduced it to the Demak Sultanate. Initially colourless, dawet later adopted a distinctive green hue derived from suji leaves, a colour often associated with symbolic and spiritual meanings in Javanese culture. Today, dawet remains widely consumed across Indonesia, commonly sold in traditional markets and street stalls, with numerous regional adaptations that contribute to its continued cultural relevance.

In Java, the term dawet generally refers to the complete beverage comprising green cendol jellies, usually made from aren (Arenga pinnata) sago or rice flour, served with coconut milk and liquid gula jawa or palm sugar syrup. In Banjarnegara, Central Java, dawet has traditionally been served without ice. However, the addition of ice cubes or shaved ice is now common.

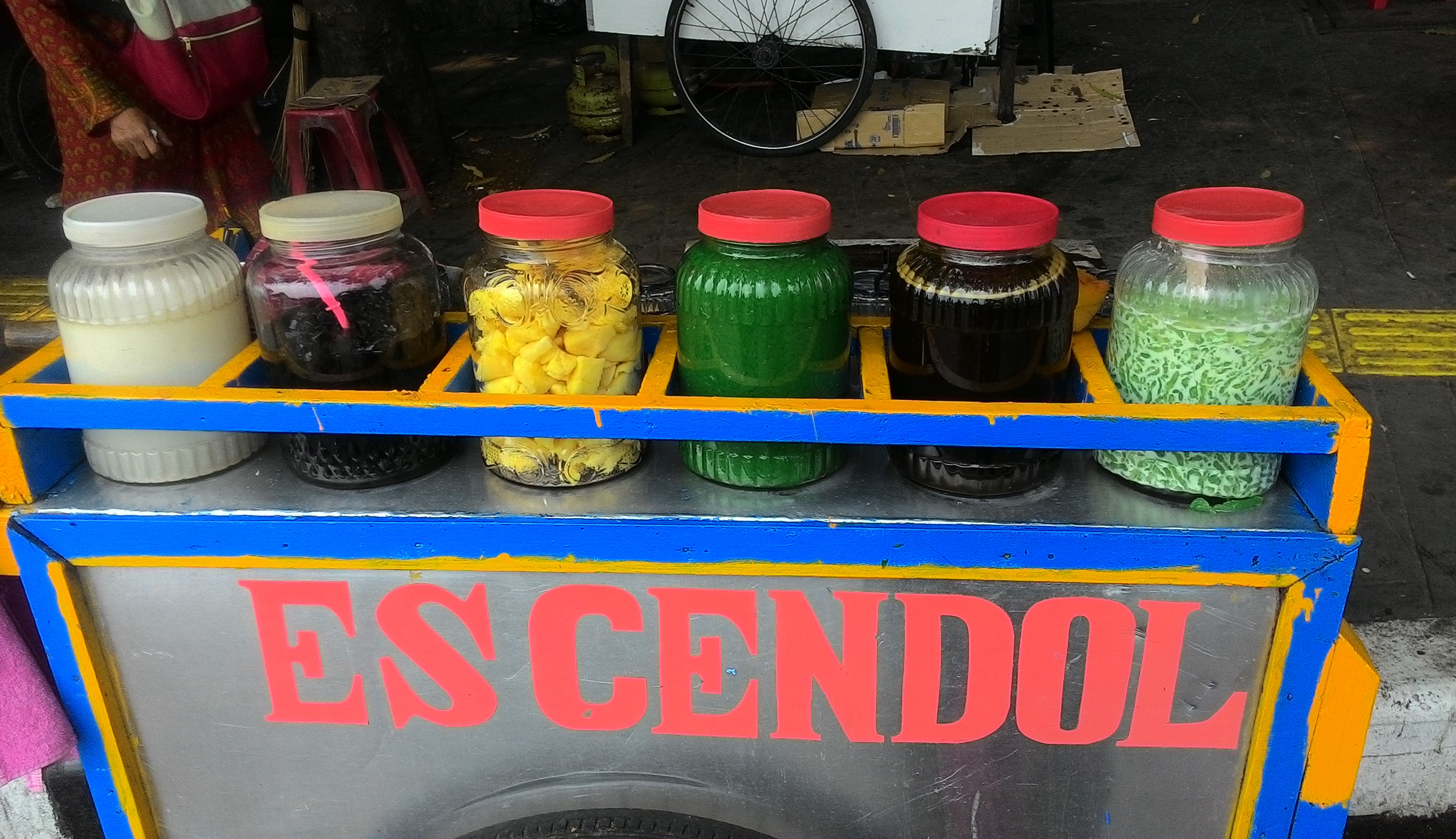
Es Cendol street vendor in Jakarta, Indonesia, showing ingredients including coconut milk, black grass jelly, tapai (fermented sweet cassava), cendol without coconut milk, liquid palm sugar, and green cendol jellies in coconut milk

In Indonesia, cendol is frequently served with additional ingredients such as tapai (fermented sweet cassava), black grass jelly, diced jackfruit, durian flesh and sweetened or chocolate condensed milk. Serving styles vary by region, with cendol typically presented in tall glasses in Java, while in West Sumatra it is more commonly served in bowls. Textural quality is considered an important characteristic of the dish, and achieving the desired chewiness depends on maintaining a balanced proportion of rice flour and sago flour in the jelly mixture.

Numerous regional variations exist across Indonesia, reflecting local ingredients and culinary practices. In Central Java, Javanese es dawet ayu from Banjarnegara is a well known regional style, while another variant, es dawet ireng from Purworejo, features black cendol. Ireng is the Javanese word for “black”, and unlike the green pandan coloured jelly, this variant derives its colour from merang, the ash of burned rice stalks mixed with water. In Bayat Village in Klaten and Jabung Village in Ponorogo, cendol is made from aren flour, producing a pale and translucent appearance.

In Karanganyar Regency, dawet ungu, a purple variant, is prepared using sweet potato, while dawet beras from Tegal is made from rice flour and is white in colour. In Tegal, the drink is traditionally prepared by striking a lime into a bowl before adding the cendol and liquid palm sugar. A well-known speciality from Surakarta (Solo) is dawet telasih, which combines cendol with black sticky rice, rice pudding, fermented sticky rice, basil seeds, coconut milk, sweetened syrup, and ice. In West Sumatra, cendol, locally known as cindua, commonly appears in two colours, green and red, reflecting local ingredient preferences and colouring practices, with the red variant prepared from a mixture of sago palm flour and rice flour and coloured using extract derived from gambier sap.

=== Malaysia, Singapore and Brunei ===
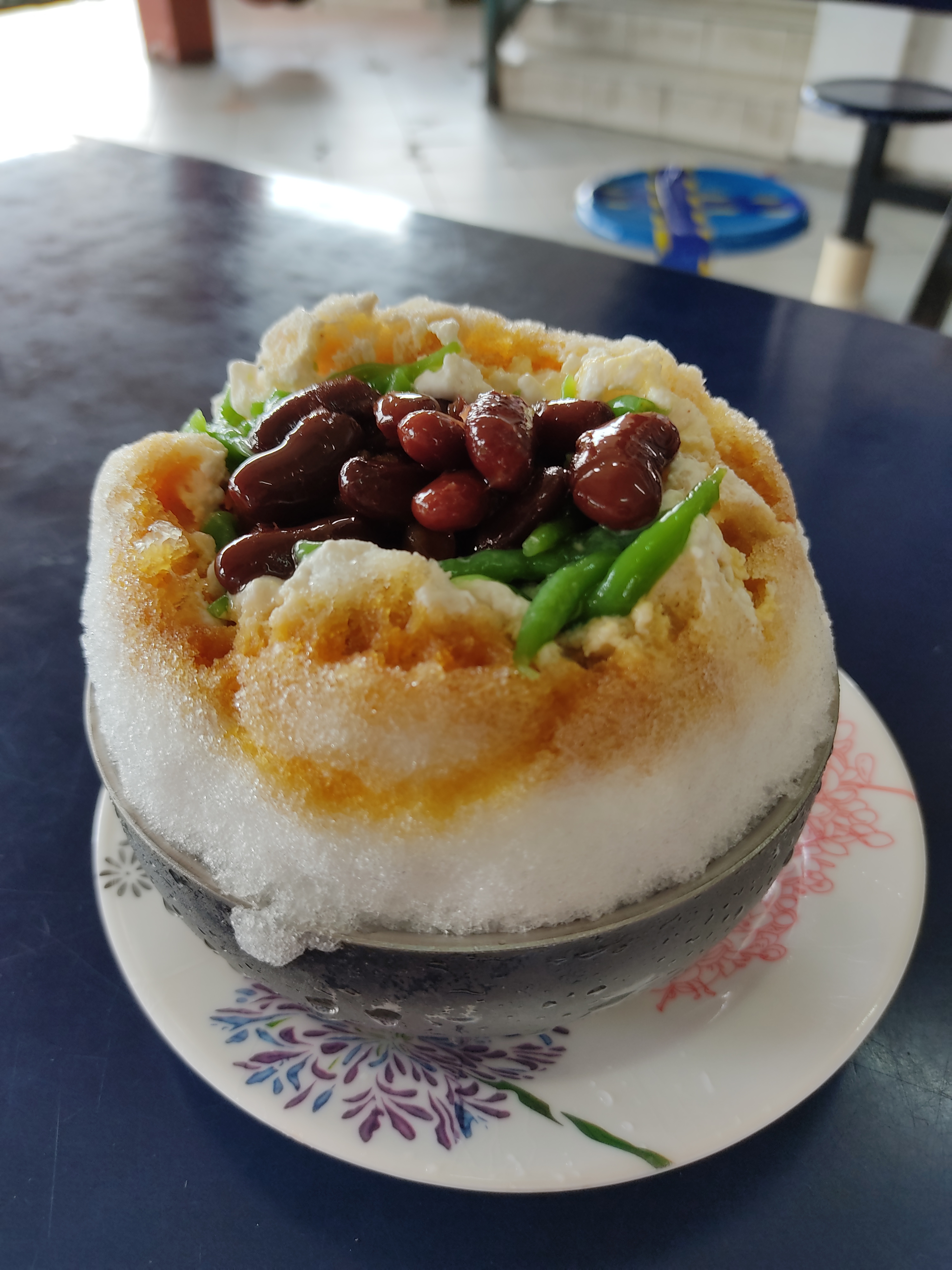
ABC (Air Batu Campur), also known as Ais Kacang, a Malaysian, Singaporean and Bruneian shaved ice dessert, topped in this version with cendol, beans, peanuts, creamed coconut and jelly.

In Malaysia, Singapore and Brunei, cendol developed within the broader context of urban hawker culture, particularly in port and trading centres, where it adapted to local preferences while retaining its essential elements of rice flour jelly, coconut milk and palm sugar syrup. During the colonial period, the increased availability of commercially produced ice, especially in major Malayan ports such as Melaka and Penang, contributed to the widespread emergence of iced versions of the dessert. Ice brought ashore from refrigerated trading vessels was utilised by local vendors, who combined it with existing components such as coconut milk, palm sugar and various toppings, including sweetened red beans.

In regions such as Penang, cendol became deeply embedded in local food culture, initially sold by itinerant street vendors before becoming a staple of permanent hawker stalls. Localisation occurred through the culinary practices and preferences of different communities, and the dessert has long been consumed by Malay, Peranakan, Chinese and Indian populations, while also being documented in colonial-era sources as a distinctive regional speciality. Over time, a range of variations developed with the addition of ingredients such as red beans, creamed corn, glutinous rice, durian, ice cream and additional shaved ice. In some areas, coconut milk is replaced with santan sawit (palm-kernel milk) in a variant commonly known as cendol sawit.

Drawing on this tradition, ais kacang developed as a more elaborate shaved ice dessert, combining a variety of ingredients such as red beans, sweet corn, grass jelly, attap chee (palm seed), and coloured syrups, often topped with a drizzle of condensed milk. In many Malaysian variations, cendol continues to serve as a central component, linking ais kacang directly to its earlier forms and highlighting the continuity of the region’s hawker dessert culture.

== Cultural role ==
=== Intangible cultural heritage ===
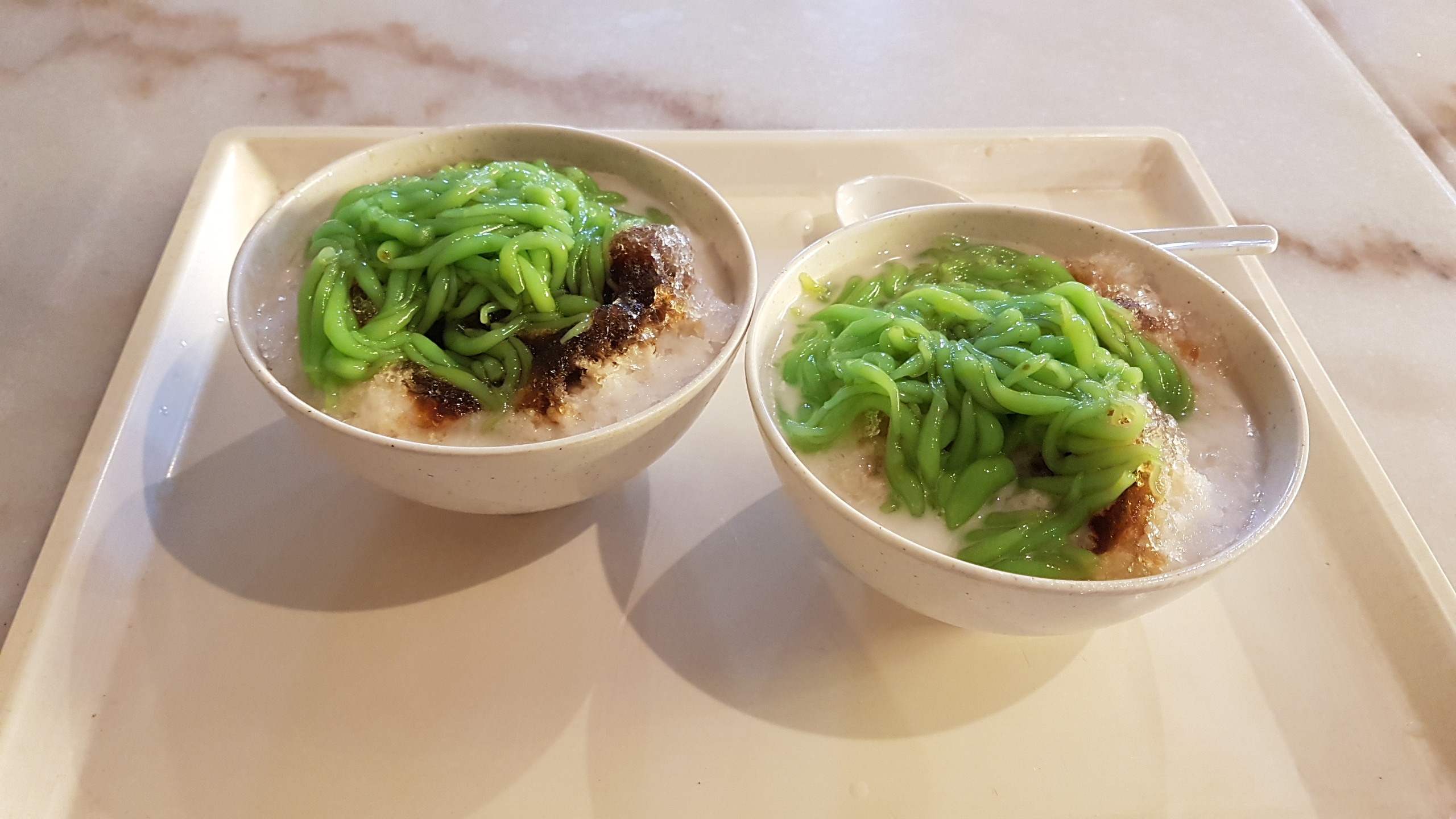
Two bowls of chendol served at Cendol Melaka, Changi Village, Singapore

Cendol is formally recognised as part of the culinary heritage of several Southeast Asian countries. In Indonesia, five regional traditions of cendol preparation have been recognized as intangible cultural heritage by the Ministry of Education and Culture. Three Javanese dawet traditions, dawet, dawet camcau and dawet sambel, were registered in 2010 and 2018 under Yogyakarta province. Es cendol was recognized in 2016 under West Java province, while cendol was recognized in 2020 under Riau Islands province.

In Malaysia, cendol has been officially designated as a heritage food by the Department of National Heritage. In Singapore, cendol is included in the Submission to UNESCO for the Nomination of Hawker Culture, reflecting its status as a culturally significant dish within the city-state’s street-food tradition.

=== Cindolo in the Bugis house relocation ceremony ===
Cindolo is associated with mabbule bola, a traditional house relocation ceremony among the Bugis people of South Sulawesi in which a stilt house is collectively lifted and repositioned by community members. Following the completion of the relocation, cindolo, prepared from glutinous rice flour, palm sugar, and coconut milk, is customarily served as refreshment for participants. The practice functions as an expression of communal reciprocity and hospitality and reflects the wider concept of mutual cooperation, as well as social cohesion and collective responsibility within Bugis customary society.

=== Mont let saung and cendol in festivals and celebrations ===
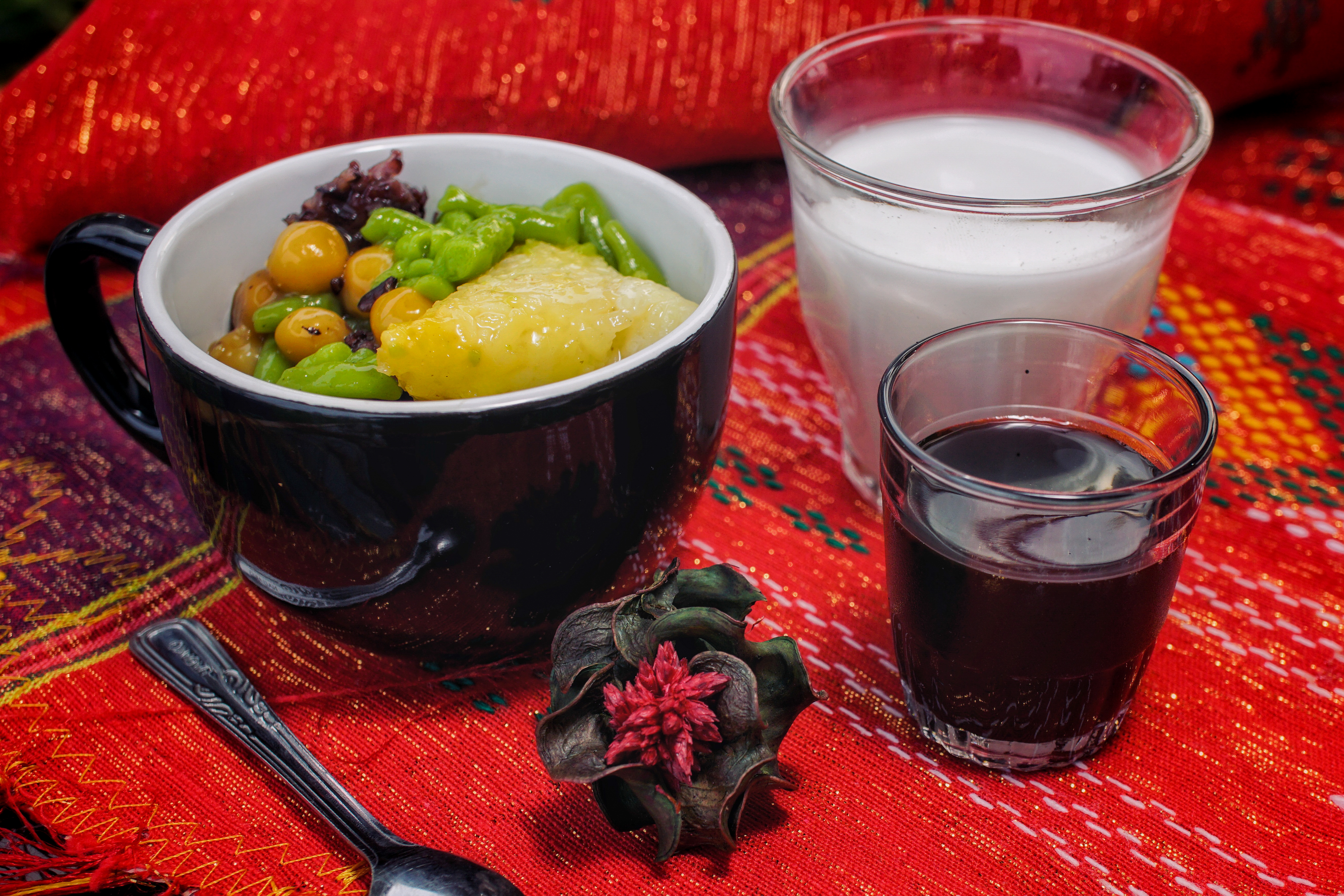
Toge Penyabungan, a traditional dessert drink from North Sumatra, commonly consumed during Ramadan, featuring cendol alongside lupis, black glutinous rice (pulut hitam), and glutinous rice cakes (candi ketan), served with coconut milk and palm sugar syrup.

In Myanmar, mont let saung is commonly consumed during Thingyan, the Burmese New Year, as part of the festive celebrations. Across other parts of Southeast Asia, cendol is a traditional dessert featured in cultural and religious festivals. In Indonesia, Malaysia, Brunei and Singapore, it is particularly popular for breaking the fast during Ramadan, typically served with shaved ice and palm sugar syrup. Its refreshing qualities make it well-suited to the tropical climate, and it is often included alongside other local sweets in festive meals.

=== Symbolism in wedding rituals ===
Lod chong in Thailand and cendol (dawet) in Java, Indonesia hold important symbolic roles in traditional wedding ceremonies, reflecting cultural values and auspicious wishes for the couple. In Thai weddings, lod chong, historically called nokploi (“released bird”), is served as part of the four-cup dessert set (ชุดขนมกินสี่ถ้วย). It represents enduring and smooth love, alongside other sweets symbolising fertility, blossoming affection and steadfastness. The dessert’s green colour and noodle-like form evoke wild parrots, which in Thai folklore signify fidelity and auspiciousness. Its inclusion in the wedding set reflects Hindu-Brahmin cultural influence from South India, integrating symbolic meanings of nature, love and prosperity.

In Javanese weddings, cendol plays a ceremonial role during the Midodareni ceremony, held a day before the wedding. Parents perform the dodol dawet (“selling dawet”) ritual after the siraman bridal shower, offering cendol to guests who pay with terracotta coins later given to the bride as a symbol of family earnings. This ritual expresses the parents’ hope that the wedding will be well attended, “as plentiful as the cendol jellies being sold,” while reinforcing prosperity, community participation, and blessings for the newlyweds.

== In popular culture ==
In colloquial Indonesian, the term "cendol" has become an online rating system originated from Indonesian internet forum KASKUS, which its user accounts rating system represented as green "cendol" for positive and red "bata" (brick) for negative. If an online items tweaks interest, a user punch in one or more green commas resembling a cendol.

Cendol dawet chant created by Abah Lala has become popular in Indonesia. It is inserted in the song of Javanese singer Didi Kempot.

== See also ==
- Ais kacang
- Es campur
- Es doger
- Es teler
- Halo-halo
- Kakigōri
- Namkhaeng sai
- List of desserts
