= Shwe yin aye =

Burmese dessert dish

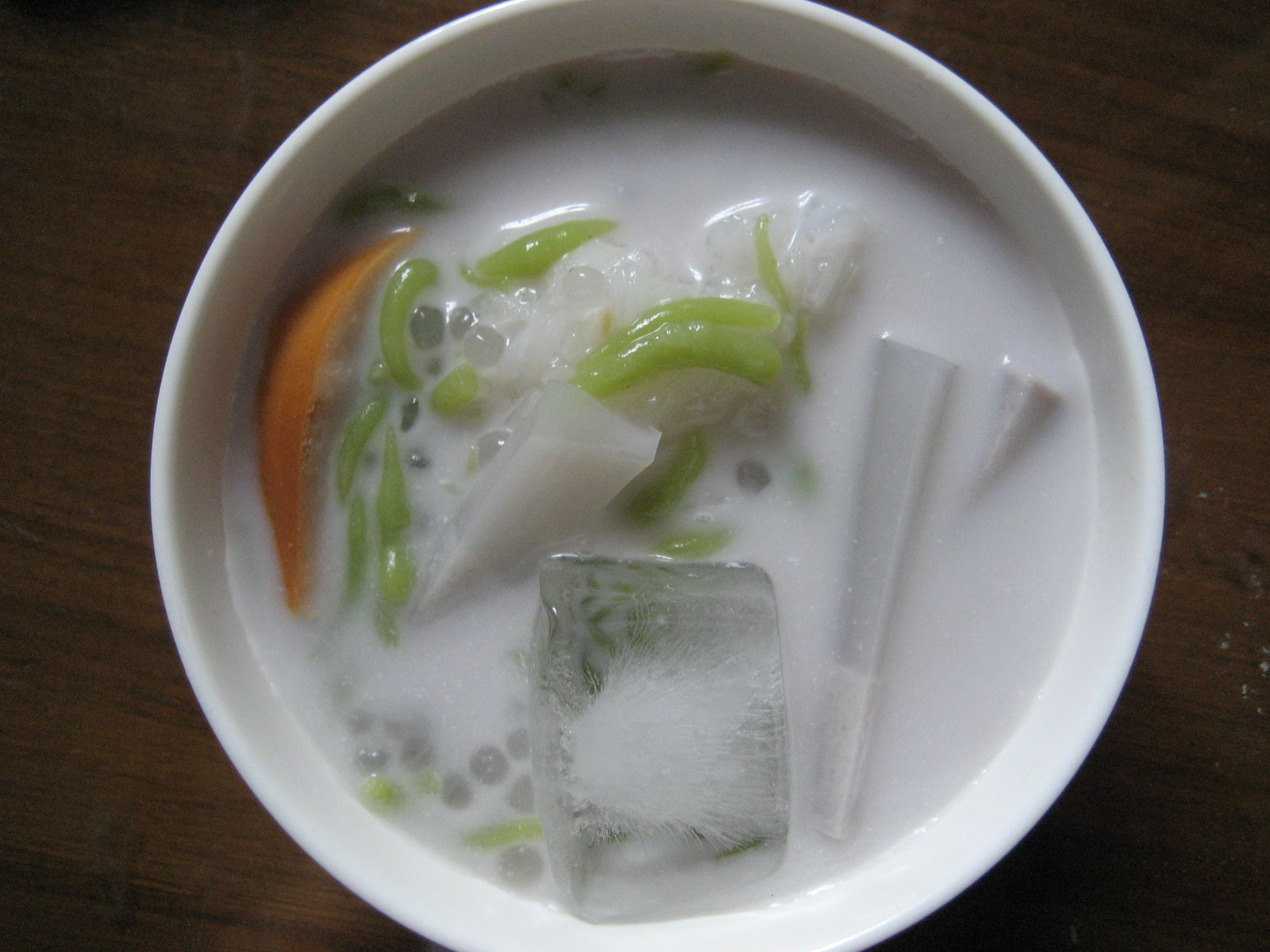
- Type: Dessert
- Place of origin: Myanmar (Burma)
- Associated cuisine: Burmese
- Main ingredients: Sago, coconut jelly, cendol, sugar, coconut milk, sticky rice, white bread

Shwe Yin Aye (Burmese: ရွှေရင်အေး, /ʃwèjɪ̀ɴʔé/) is a traditional Burmese dessert. The name Shwe Yin Aye has a poetic meaning in Burmese. “Shwe” means gold, “Yin” refers to the mind or heart, and “Aye” means cool or calm. Together, the name can be interpreted as “a golden, cool mind. "It means that the dessert that makes your mind cool down.

== Cultural Significance ==
Shwe Yin Aye is one of the traditional desserts connected with the festival. During Thingyan, people may prepare and share it with others as a refreshing treat. Offering food during Thingyan is part of the social activities of the festival. People may share food with family, neighbours, visitors, and others during the festival. Food and drinks can be shared in places where people gather to celebrate the New Year. Shwe Yin Aye is suitable because it can be prepared in advance and served in individual bowls. Its components are prepared separately and assembled when needed. Shwe Yin Aye is shared during seasonal celebrations in Myanmar. However, it is not limited to the festival and is also enjoyed at other times of the year.

== Place in Burmese food culture ==
Traditional desserts are part of the wider food culture of Myanmar. They include preparations made from rice, coconut, sugar, fruit, beans, and other ingredients. It is a dessert made with several ingredients rather than just one main ingredient. This approach allows ingredients with different textures to be combined in one serving. The ingredients are used in various other desserts across Southeast Asia. Rice, sago, coconut milk, and jelly are components of many sweet dishes in the region. The dessert is both a seasonal refreshment and a food connected with social sharing. Shwe Yin Aye is still sold by vendors and in local markets, so people can enjoy it outside festivals. This connects traditional dessert-making with modern food-selling practices in Myanmar.

== Ingredients and preparation ==
=== Ingredients ===
The ingredients are

1. sticky rice,
2. sago,
3. pandan jelly,
4. gelatin,
5. coconut jelly,
6. white bread, and
7. coconut milk.

=== Preparation ===
1. Sticky rice is one of the main solid ingredients. It is cooked until soft and sweetened before adding to the dessert. Its soft and slightly sticky texture adds a solid part that contrasts with the jelly and liquid ingredients.
2. Sago pearls are another rice-like component used in Shwe Yin Aye. They are prepared separately until they reach a soft, translucent texture. Their small, rounded shape and chewy texture add flavor to the dessert.
3. Pandan jelly noodles provide a chewy jelly component. Pandan is used in Southeast Asian desserts and gives food an aroma and green color. During preparation, pandan jelly noodles are cut into strands and mixed with the other ingredients.
4. Gelatin is used as another jelly component. After preparation and setting, it is cut into smaller pieces suitable for serving. Its soft, smooth texture provides a contrast to the chewy sago pearls and sticky rice.
5. Coconut jelly adds another coconut-based component to the dessert. It adds a soft, jelly-like texture and goes well with coconut milk.
6. White bread is included in pieces alongside the other ingredients. The bread absorbs some coconut milk, making it softer.
7. Sweetened coconut milk forms the liquid base of Shwe Yin Aye. It is prepared separately and cooled before adding to the serving bowl. Coconut milk mixes with the other ingredients. It gives the dessert a creamy texture and sweet coconut flavor.

== Variations and serving ==
=== Variations ===
The ingredients used in Shwe Yin Aye can differ from place to place. Preparations use brands of jelly, rice, or coconut-based ingredients. These changes affect the dessert's texture, appearance, and ingredients. And to keep it as a chilled mixture served with coconut milk. Differences in jelly ingredients can change the texture of the finished dessert. One-third of the proportion is soft jelly, while the rest include more chewy or firm texture. The use of different brands of jelly types creates variations in color and appearance.Rice-based ingredients can also differ between preparations. The amount of sticky rice and sago affects the balance of soft, chewy, and liquid parts. The amount of each ingredient can be added, and there is no fixed number for the recipe. Coconut-based ingredients provide another variation. The amount and sweetness of coconut milk influence the overall flavor. The inclusion of coconut jelly adds another texture. It changes to the liquid base and can alter the richness of the dessert.

=== Serving ===
After its ingredients have been combined with sweetened coconut milk, the dessert is served. It is consumed cold or chilled, with ice, according to the preparation method. The dessert can be served as an individual portion, or the amount depends on the number of people. The texture of Shwe Yin Aye changes after assembly. The sticky rice and sago stay in the coconut milk. And the jelly keeps its shape, and the bread absorbs some of the liquid. The combination creates a dessert with chewy and sweet textures in a single serving. The cold serving method is an important part of the dessert's preparation. Chilling helps maintain its refreshing character during warm weather. Ice is added to lower the temperature at the time of serving. The amount of ice affects the taste because melted ice makes the coconut milk waterier.

== Seasonal consumption and availability ==
=== Summer consumption ===
Shwe Yin Aye is associated with summer in Myanmar and is served cold during this season. Its chilled preparation makes it suitable for consumption in hot weather. During the hot season, cold foods and drinks form part of everyday refreshment practices. Shwe Yin Aye fits this pattern because it is served with ice or chilled before consumption. The dessert's composition also contributes to its character as a summer food. Coconut milk provides a creamy liquid base. Sticky rice, sago pearls, and jelly offer chewy textures. The inclusion of bread creates a soft component that absorbs the liquid. These elements combine to produce a cold dessert.

=== Availability in Myanmar ===
Shwe Yin Aye is available in Myanmar through street vendors and local markets. It's sold by local food businesses. That allows people to enjoy the dessert outside their homes and festivals. It is also prepared for consumption during the summer season. They provide convenient options for buying prepared food and drinks as fast food. Shwe Yin Aye is one of the cold desserts sold in these places, making it easy to enjoy a chilled sweet on hot days. Vendors can prepare ingredients in advance and combine them when serving customers. This method allows the dessert to be served based on demand. And keeping the ingredients ready to mix.
