= No htamin =

Milk and rice dish from Myanmar

Milk rice
- Type: Starch
- Place of origin: Myanmar (Burma)
- Associated cuisine: Burmese cuisine
- Main ingredients: long-grained rice; milk; salt; shallots
- Similar dishes: Buttered rice, coconut rice

No htamin (Burmese: နို့ထမင်း; IPA: [no̰ tʰəmɪ́ɴ], also known in English as milk rice) is a festive rice dish in Burmese cuisine, typically associated with celebratory occasions and generally regarded for its restorative properties.

Buttered rice uses long-grained paw hsan hmwe or basmati rice, and is cooked with milk, shallots, butter, salt, and optionally with spices such as garam masala, cumin and aniseed. It is typically eaten with Burmese curries.

== See also ==
- List of rice dishes
