= Burmese cuisine =

Culinary traditions of Myanmar

Burmese cuisine encompasses the diverse regional culinary traditions of Myanmar, which have developed through longstanding agricultural practices, centuries of sociopolitical and economic change, and cross-cultural contact and trade with neighboring countries at the confluence of Southeast Asia, East Asia, and South Asia, such as modern-day nations of Thailand, China, and India, respectively.

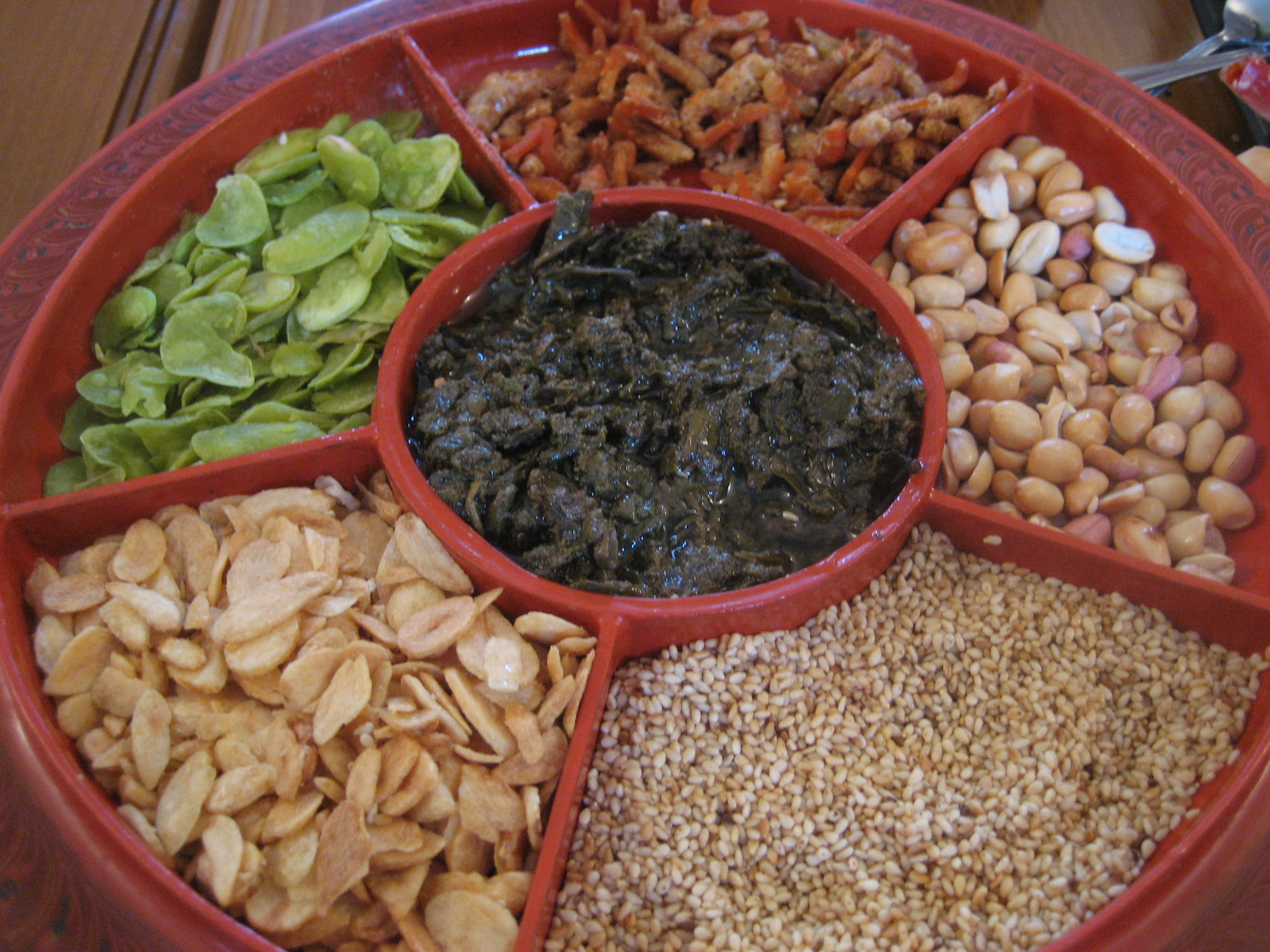
Laphet, served in a traditional lacquer tray called laphet ok.

Burmese cuisine is typified by a wide-ranging array of dishes, including traditional Burmese curries and stews, Burmese salads, accompanied by soups and a medley of vegetables that are traditionally eaten with white rice. Burmese curries are generally distinguished from other Southeast Asian curries in the former's prominent use of an aromatic trio of garlic, shallots, and ginger (in common with South Asian curries), and the general lack of coconut milk.

Burmese cuisine also features Indian breads as well as noodles, which are fried or prepared in salads and noodle soups, chief among them mohinga. Street food and snack culture have also nurtured the profuse variety of traditional Burmese fritters and modern savory and sweet snacks labeled under the umbrella of mont.

The contrasting flavor profile of Burmese cuisine is broadly captured in the phrase chin ngan sat (ချဉ်ငန်စပ်), which literally means "sour, salty, and spicy". A popular Burmese rhyme—"of all the fruit, the mango's the best; of all the meat, the pork's the best; and of all the vegetables, lahpet's (tea leaves are) the best"—sums up the traditional favourites. (Note: The traditional rhyme is "A thee ma, thayet; a thar ma, wet; a ywet ma, lahpet" (အသီးမှာသရက်၊ အသားမှာဝက်၊ အရွက်မှာလက်ဖက်။).)

== History ==
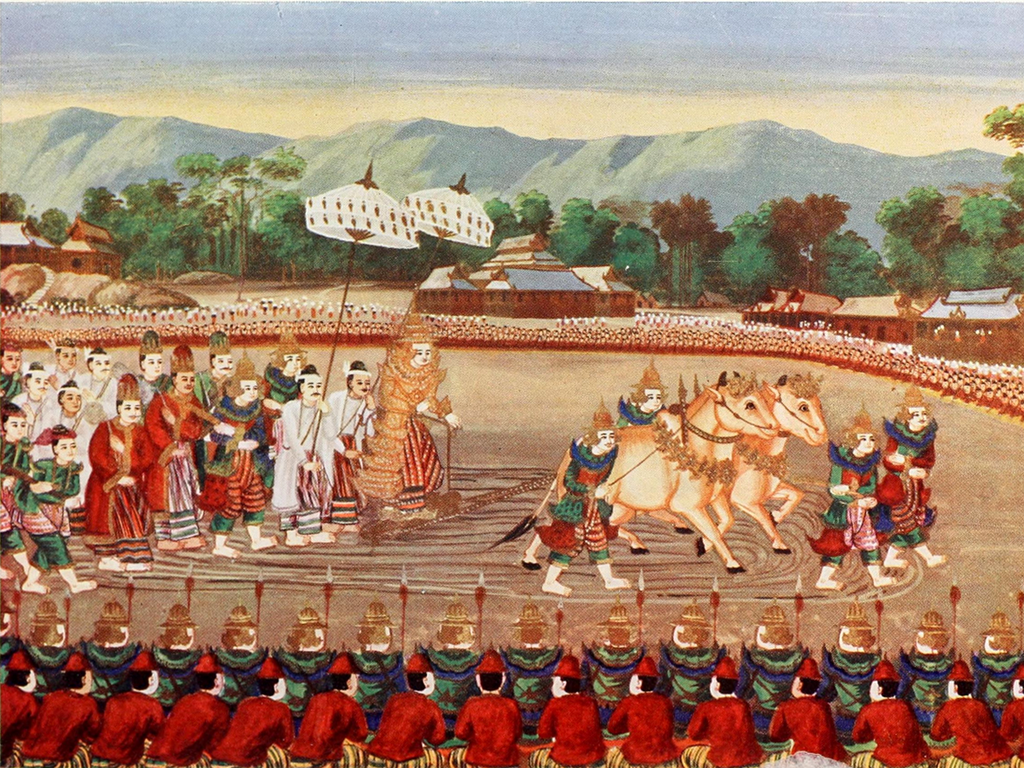
A traditional Burmese painting depicts the Royal Ploughing Ceremony, during which the monarch ceremonially ploughs a rice field outside the royal palace, to mark the traditional start of the rice-growing season.

Rice is the principal staple in Burmese cuisine, reflecting several millennia of rice cultivation, which first emerged in the country's Chindwin, Ayeyarwady, and Thanlwin river valleys between 11,000 and 5000 BCE. By 3000 BCE, irrigated rice cultivation flourished in the region, paralleled by the domestication of cattle and pigs by inhabitants.

In addition to rice, tea originated in the borderlands separating Myanmar from China, precipitating a longstanding tradition of tea consumption and the development of pickled tea known as laphet, which continues to play a pivotal role in Burmese ritual culture. This longstanding history is reflected in the Burmese language, which is among the few world languages whose word for "tea" is not etymologically traced back to the Chinese word for "tea" (see etymology of tea).

Agrarian settlements were settled by ancestors of Myanmar's modern-day ethnolinguistic groups. From these settlements emerged a succession of Burmese, Mon, Shan, Rakhine-speaking kingdoms and tributary states that now make up contemporary Myanmar. Paddy rice cultivation remains synonymous with the predominantly Buddhist Bamar, Mon, Shan, and Rakhine peoples who inhabit the country's fertile lowlands and plateaus.

Burmese cuisine has been significantly enriched by contact and trade with neighboring kingdoms and countries well into modern times. The Columbian exchange in the 15th and 16th centuries introduced key ingredients into the Burmese culinary repertoire, including tomatoes, chili peppers, peanuts, and potatoes. A series of Burmese–Siamese wars between the 16th to 19th centuries resulted in the emergence of Thai-inspired delicacies, including khanon dok, shwe yin aye, mont let hsaung, and Yodaya mont di.

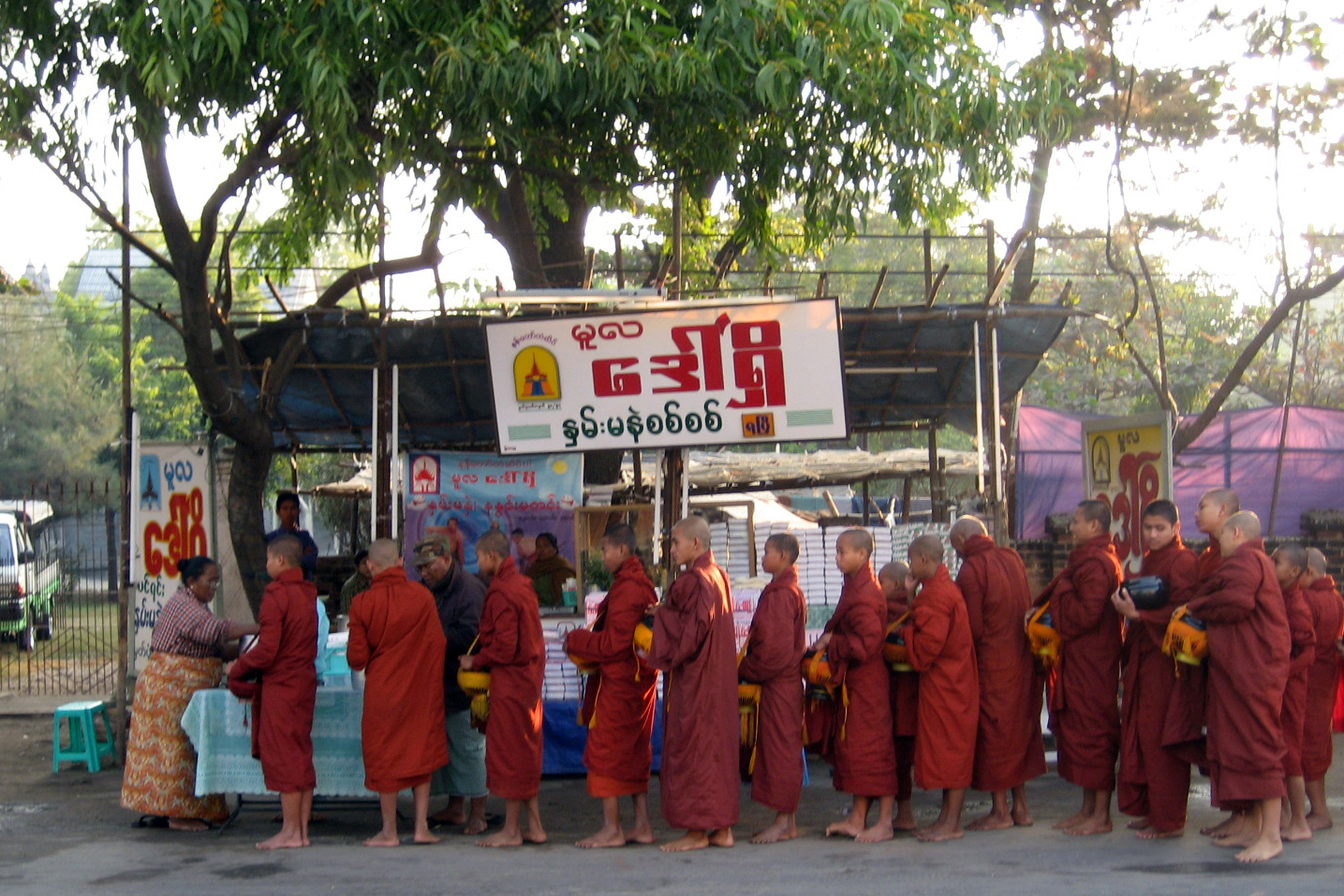
Buddhist monks in Mandalay receive food alms from a htamanè hawker during their daily alms round (ဆွမ်းလောင်းလှည့်).

While record-keeping of pre-colonial culinary traditions is scant, food was and remains deeply intertwined with religious life, especially among Buddhist communities, exemplified in the giving of food alms (dāna), and communal feasts called satuditha and ahlu pwe (အလှူပွဲ). One of the few remaining pre-colonial cookbooks is the Sadawhset Kyan (စားတော်ဆက်ကျမ်း, lit. 'Treatise on Royal Foods'), written on a palm leaf manuscript in 1866 during the Konbaung dynasty. By the Konbaung dynasty (16th to 19th centuries), elaborate preparations of food played a central role in key court ceremonies (e.g., naming ceremonies, wedding ceremonies, etc.), including as ritual offerings to Hindu and indigenous deities, and as celebratory meals for attendees. By the Konbaung period, 126 distinct varieties of rice were cultivated in the country.

British rule in Burma between the 19th and 20th centuries led to the establishment of Burmese Indian and Sino-Burmese communities that introduced novel cooking techniques, ingredients, food vocabulary, and fusion dishes that are now considered integral parts of Burmese cuisine. These range from Indian breads such as naan and paratha to Chinese stir frying techniques and ingredients like tofu and soy sauce.

== Etiquette and customs ==
=== Dining ===
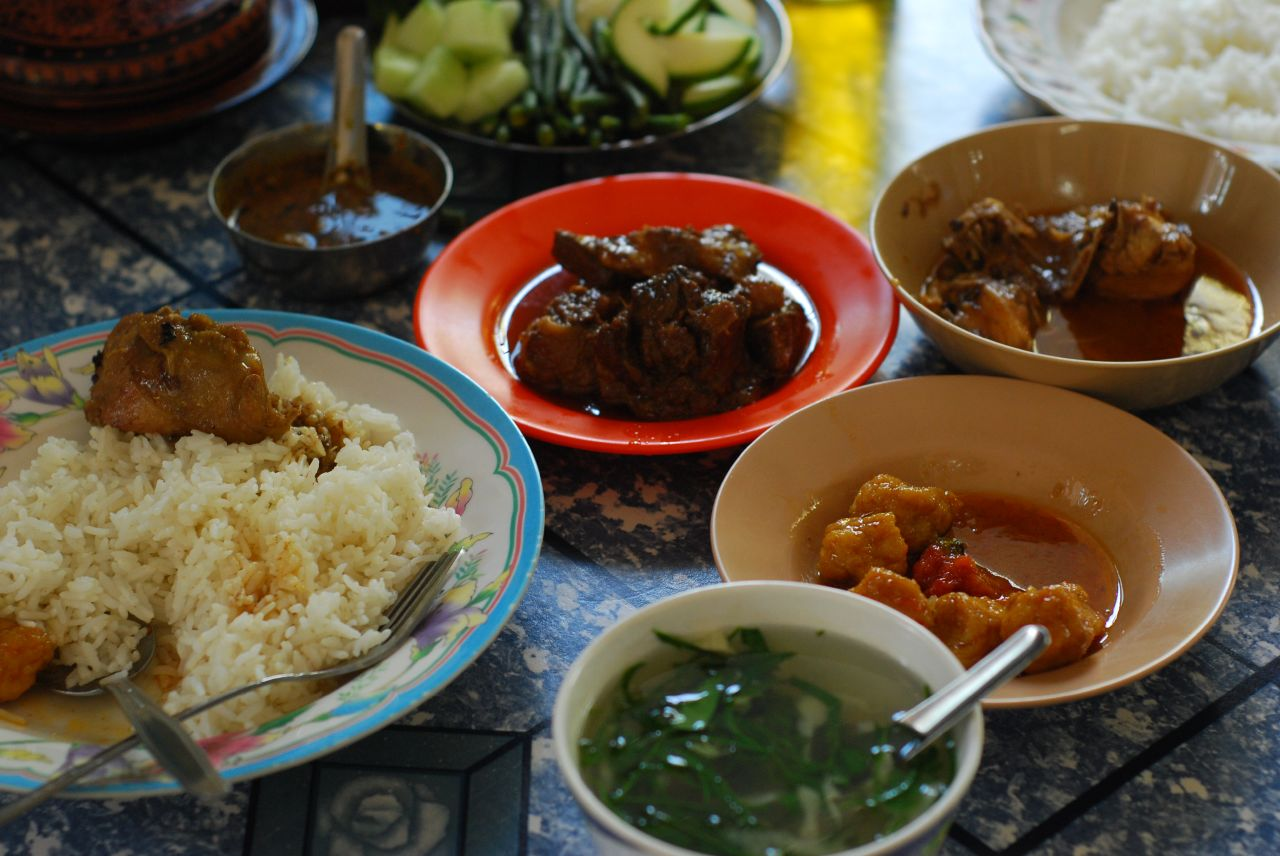
A traditional Burmese meal includes a bowl of soup, rice, several meat curries, and ngapi yay (a dip or dipping sauce) with tozaya (vegetables for dipping).

Traditionally, the Burmese eat meals from plates on a low table or daunglan, while sitting on a bamboo mat. Dishes are simultaneously served and shared. A traditional meal includes steamed white rice as the main dish accompanied by Burmese curries, a light soup or consommé, and other side dishes, including fried vegetables, Burmese fritters, and ngapi yay gyo (ငါးပိရည်ကျို), a plate of fresh and blanched vegetables served with pickled fish dip. The meal is then finished with a piece of palm sugar or laphet (fermented tea leaves).

Out of respect, the eldest diners are always served first before the rest join in; even when the elders are absent, the first morsel of rice from the pot is scooped and put aside as an act of respect to one's parents, a custom known as u cha (ဦးချ, lit. 'first serve').

The Burmese traditionally eat with their right hand, forming the rice into a small ball with only the fingertips and mixing this with various morsels before popping it into their mouths. Chopsticks and Chinese-style spoons are used for noodle dishes, although noodle salads are more likely to be eaten with just a spoon. Western-style utensils, especially forks and knives, have gained currency in recent years.

In traditional Burmese eateries, green tea and numerous side dishes are served complimentary alongside the main dishes and rice.

=== Religious practices ===
The country's diverse religious makeup influences its cuisine, as Buddhists and Hindus traditionally avoid beef and Muslims pork. Beef is considered taboo by devout Buddhists and farmers because the cow is highly regarded as a beast of burden. Vegetarianism is commonly practiced by Buddhists during the three-month Vassa (ဝါတွင်း) between July and October, as well as during Uposatha days, reflected in the Burmese word for "vegetarian", thet that lut (သက်သတ်လွတ်, lit. 'free of killing'). During this time, devout Buddhists observe eight or more precepts, including fasting rules that restrict food intake to two daily meals (i.e., breakfast and lunch) taken before noon.

=== Beef taboo ===
The beef taboo is fairly widespread in Myanmar, particularly in the Buddhist community. In Myanmar, beef is typically obtained from cattle that are slaughtered at the end of their working lives (16 years of age) or from sick animals. Cattle is rarely raised for meat; 58% of cattle in the country is used for draught animal power. Few people eat beef, and there is a general dislike of beef (especially among the Bamar and Burmese Chinese), although it is more commonly eaten in regional cuisines, particularly those of ethnic minorities like the Kachin. Buddhists, when giving up meat during the Buddhist (Vassa) or Uposatha days, will forego beef first. Butchers tend to be Muslim because of the Buddhist doctrine of ahimsa (no harm).

During the country's last dynasty, the Konbaung dynasty, habitual consumption of beef was punishable by public flogging. In 1885, Ledi Sayadaw, a prominent Buddhist monk, wrote the Nwa-myitta-sa (နွားမေတ္တာစာ), a poetic prose letter which argued that Burmese Buddhists should not kill cattle and eat beef, because Burmese farmers depended on them as beasts of burden to maintain their livelihoods, that the marketing of beef for human consumption threatened the extinction of buffalo and cattle, and that the practice was ecologically unsound. He subsequently led successful beef boycotts during the colonial era, and influenced a generation of Burmese nationalists in adopting this stance.

On 29 August 1961, the Burmese Parliament passed the State Religion Promotion Act of 1961, which explicitly banned the slaughtering of cattle nationwide (beef became known as todo tha (တိုးတိုးသား); lit. 'hush hush meat'). Religious groups, such as Muslims, were required to apply for exemption licences to slaughter cattle on religious holidays. This ban was repealed a year later, after Ne Win led a coup d'état and declared martial law in the country.

=== Food theories ===
In traditional Burmese medicine, foods are divided into two classes: heating (အပူစာ, apu za) or cooling (အအေးစာ, a-aye za), based on their effects on one's body system, similar to the Chinese classification of food. Examples of heating foods include chicken, bitter melon, durian, mango, chocolate, and ice cream. Examples of cooling foods include pork, eggplant, dairy products, cucumbers, and radish.

The Burmese also hold several taboos and superstitions regarding consumption during various occasions in one's life, especially pregnancy. For instance, pregnant women are not supposed to eat chili due to the belief that it causes children to have sparse scalp hair.

== Cooking techniques ==
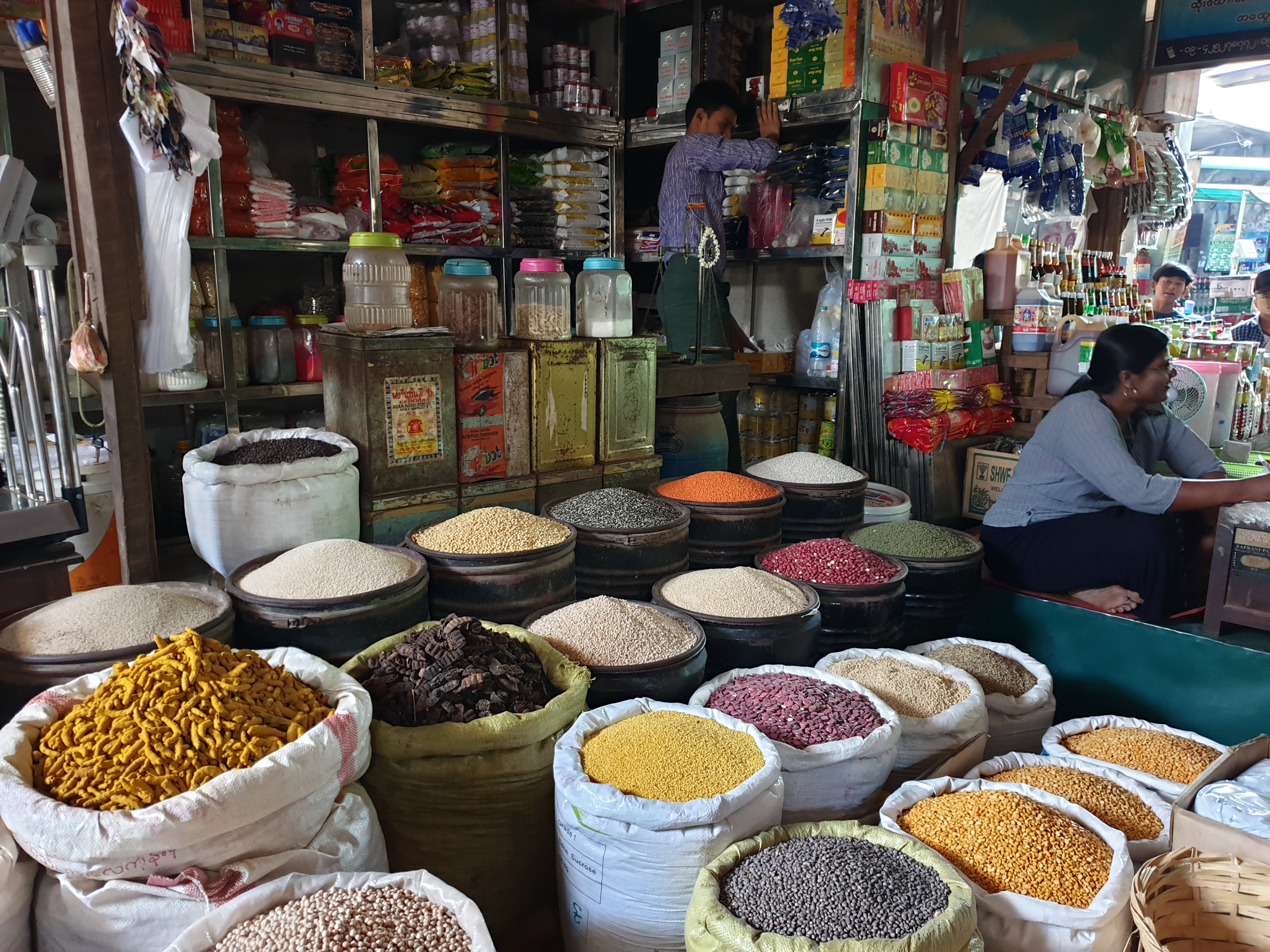
Beans and pulses are commonly used in Burmese cuisine.

Burmese dishes are not cooked with precise recipes. The use and portion of ingredients used may vary, but the precision of timing is of utmost importance. Burmese dishes may be stewed, boiled, fried, roasted, steamed, baked or grilled, or any combination of the said techniques. Burmese curries use only a handful of spices (in comparison to Indian ones) and use more fresh garlic and ginger.

== Regional cuisines ==
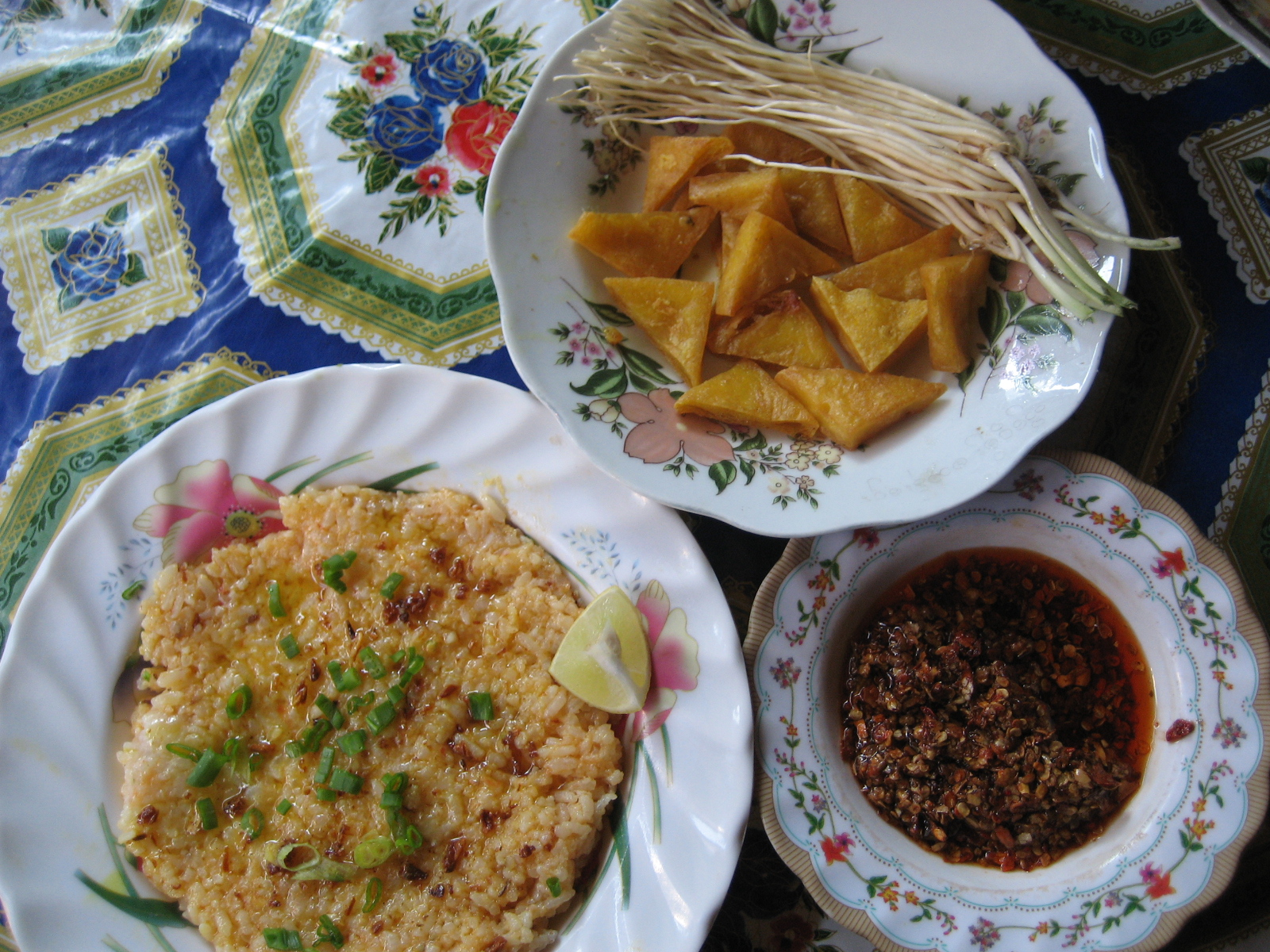
Htamin jin, 'fermented' rice kneaded with fish and/or potato with twice-fried Shan tofu, is a popular local dish at Inle Lake.

Broadly speaking, Burmese cuisine is divided between the culinary traditions of Upper Myanmar, which is inland and landlocked; and Lower Myanmar, which is surrounded by numerous rivers, river deltas, and the Andaman Sea. Variations between regional cuisines are largely driven by the availability of fresh ingredients. Myanmar's long coastline has provided an abundant source of fresh seafood, which is particularly associated with Rakhine cuisine. Southern Myanmar, particularly the area around Mawlamyaing, is known for its cuisine, as the Burmese proverb goes: "Mandalay for eloquence, Yangon for boasting, Mawlamyaing for food." (Note: The traditional Burmese proverb reads မန္တလေးစကား ရန်ကုန်အကြွား မော်လမြိုင်အစား.)

Cuisine in Lower Myanmar, including Yangon and Mawlamyaing, makes extensive use of fish and seafood-based products like fish sauce and ngapi (fermented seafood). The cuisine in Upper Myanmar, including the Bamar heartland (Mandalay, Magway, and Sagaing Regions), Shan State, and Kachin States, tends to use more meat, poultry, pulses and beans. The level of spices and use of fresh herbs varies depending on the region; Kachin and Shan curries will often use more fresh herbs.

Fusion Chettiar (ချစ်တီးကုလား) cuisine, originating from Southern Indian cuisine, is also popular in cities.

== Dishes and ingredients ==
Burmese cuisine incorporates numerous local ingredients that are less frequently used in other Southeast Asian cuisines, among them sour roselle leaves, astringent pennywort leaves, goat, mutton, and dried beans and lentils.

Because a standardised system of romanisation for spoken Burmese does not exist, pronunciations of the following dishes in modern standard Burmese are approximated using IPA, and are provided (see IPA/Burmese for details).

=== Preserved foods ===
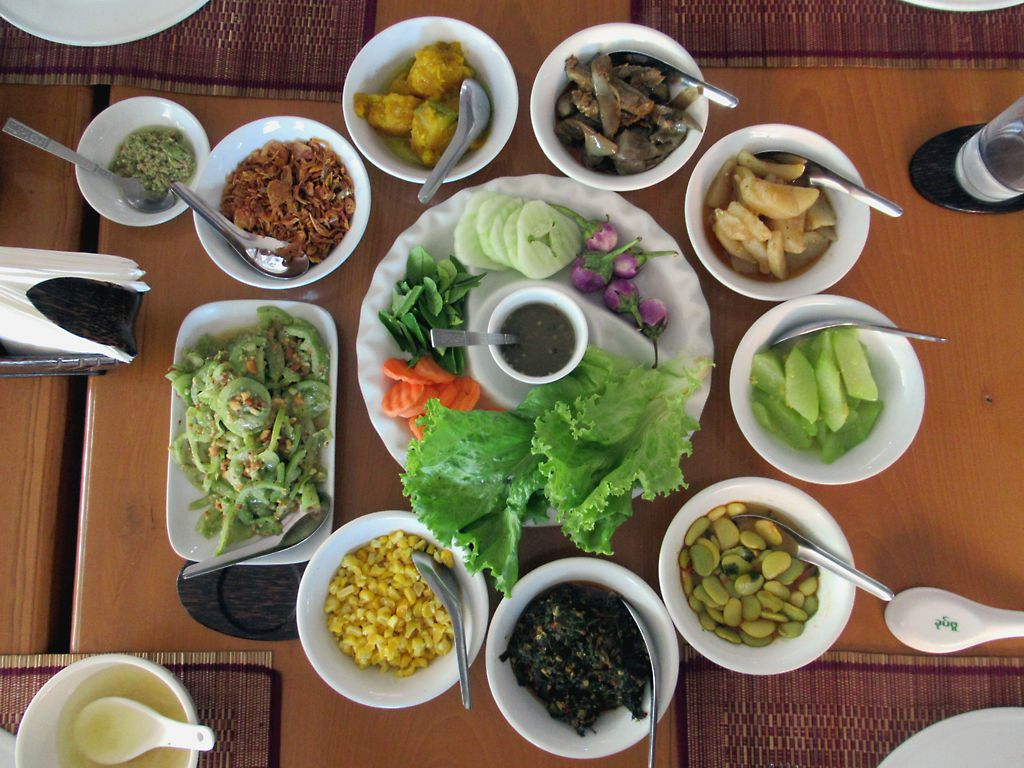
A plate of ngapi yay gyo is surrounded by an assortment of traditional Burmese side dishes.

Myanmar is one of very few countries where tea is not only drunk but eaten as lahpet, pickled tea served with various accompaniments. The practice of eating tea dates in modern-day Myanmar back to prehistoric antiquity, reflecting the legacy of indigenous tribes who pickled and fermented tea leaves inside bamboo tubes, bamboo baskets, plantain leaves and pots. Tea leaves are traditionally cultivated by the Palaung people. Pickled tea leaves continue to play an important role in Burmese culture today. Ngapi (ငါးပိ), a fermented paste made from salted fish or shrimp, is considered the cornerstone of any Burmese traditional meal. It is used to season many soups, salads, curries and dishes, and condiments, imparting a rich umami flavor. The ngapi of Rakhine State contains no or little salt, and uses marine fish. Meanwhile, ngapi made with freshwater fish is common in Ayeyarwady and Tanintharyi regions. Ngapi yay (ငါးပိရည်) is an essential part of Karen and Bamar cuisine, in which a sauce dip of ngapi cooked in various vegetables and spices is served with blanched and fresh vegetables, similar to Thai nam phrik, Indonesian lalab, and Malay ulam. Pickled fish, called ngachin, is also used in Burmese cooking.

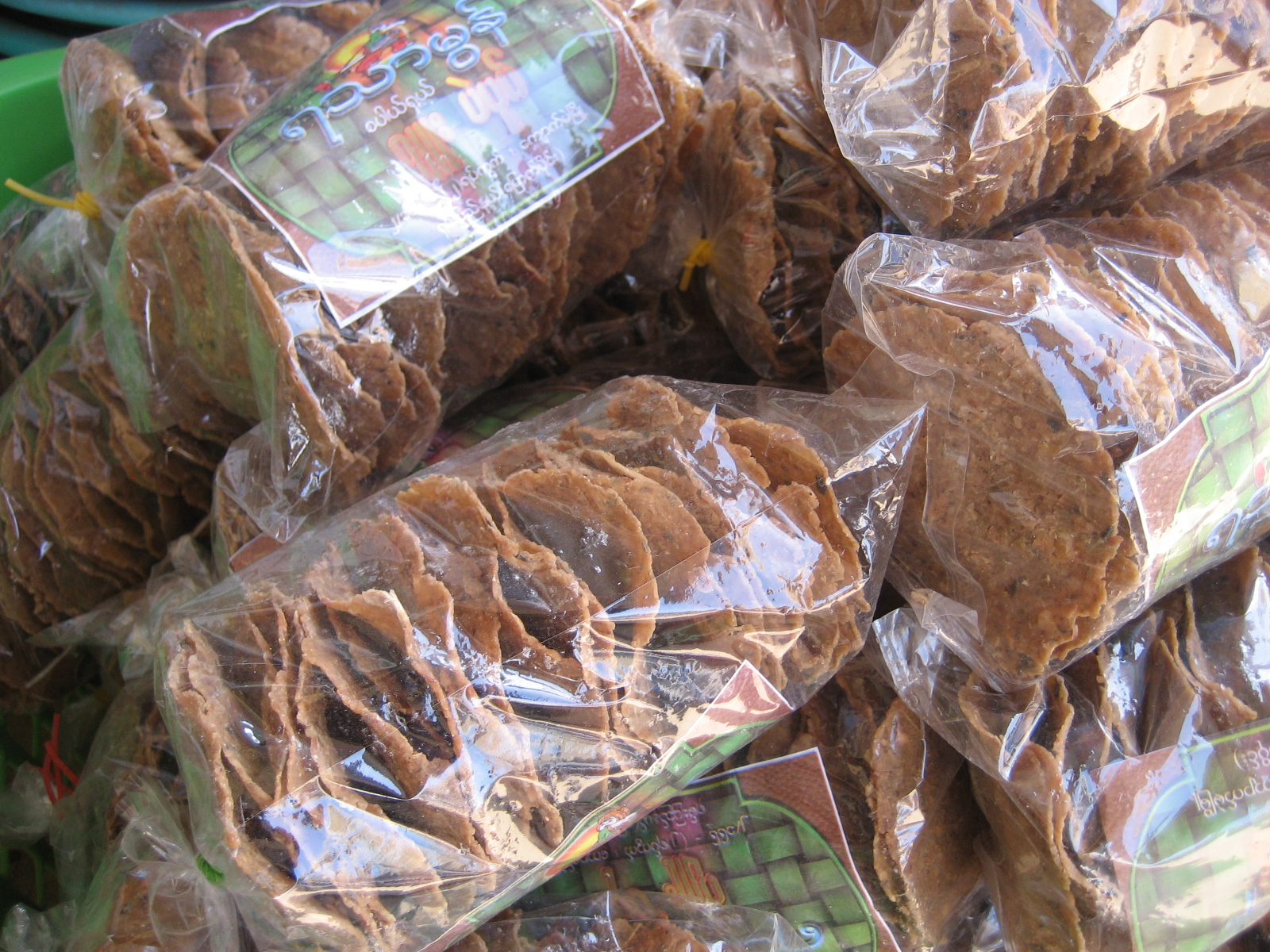
Dried fermented bean cakes called pè bok are grilled or fried in Shan cooking.

Shan cuisine traditionally uses fermented beans called pè ngapi (ပဲငါးပိ; lit. 'bean ngapi'), in lieu of ngapi, to impart umami. Dried bean ngapi chips (ပဲပုပ်; lit. 'spoiled beans') are used as condiments for various Shan dishes.

Pon ye gyi (ပုံးရည်ကြီး), a thick salty black paste made from fermented beans, is popular in the Bamar heartland. It is used in cooking, especially with pork, and as a salad with peanut oil, chopped onions and red chili. Bagan is an important pon ye gyi producer.

Burmese cuisine also features a wide variety of pickled vegetables and fruits that are preserved in oil and spices, or in brine and rice wine. The former, called thanat (သနပ်), are similar to South Asian pickles, including mango pickle. The latter are called chinbat (ချဉ်ဖတ်), and include pickles like mohnyin gyin.

=== Rice ===
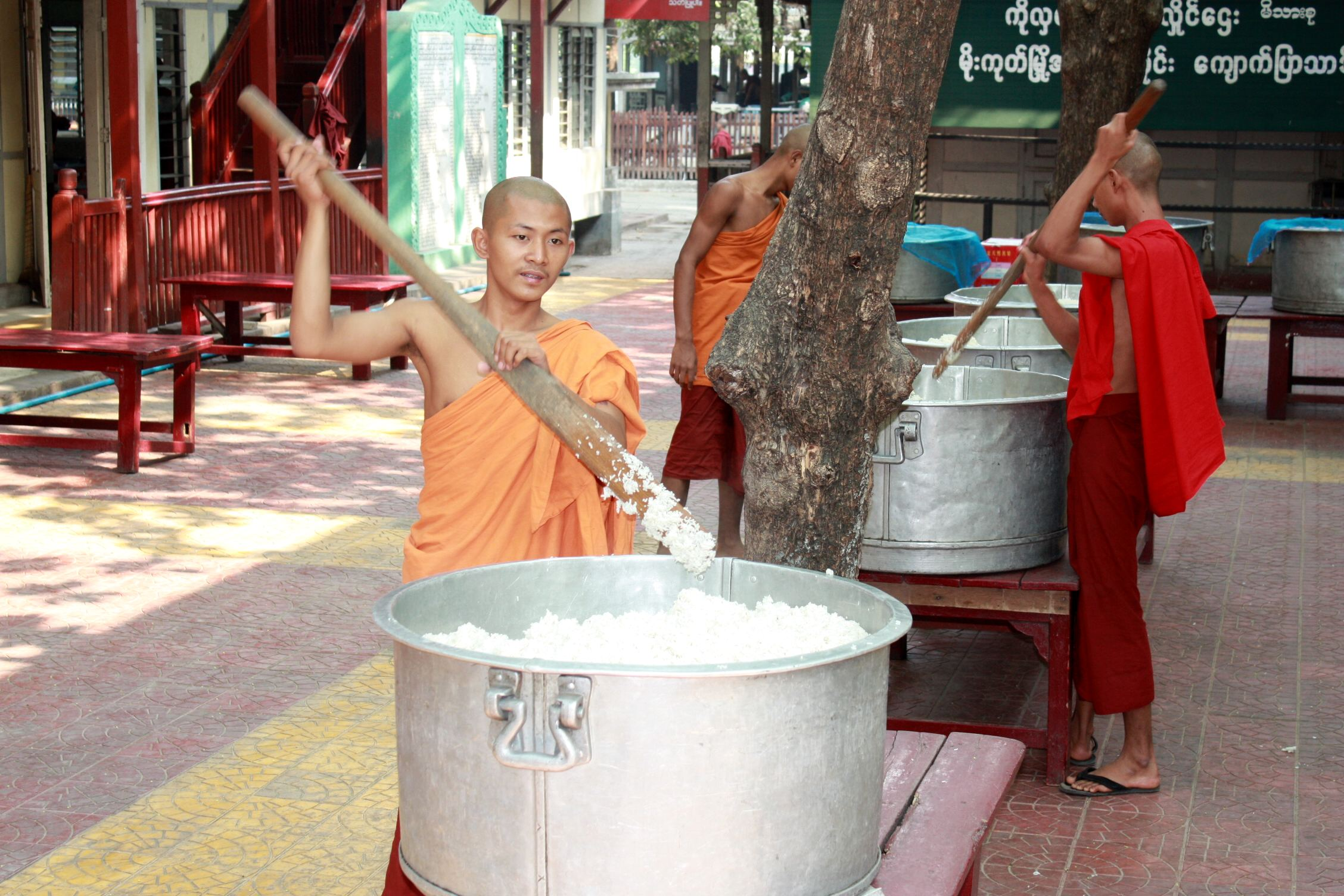
Buddhist novice monks cooking rice at the Mahagandhayon Monastery in Amarapura

The most common staple in Myanmar is steamed rice, called htamin (ထမင်း). Burmese varieties of rice are typically starchier than jasmine or basmati rice. Fragrant, aromatic varieties of white rice, including paw hsan hmwe (ပေါ်ဆန်းမွှေး), are popular. Lower-amylose varieties of glutinous rice, which are called kauk hnyin (ကောက်ညှင်း), also feature in Burmese cuisine, including a purple variety called ngacheik (ငချိပ်). Consumers in the northern highlands (e.g., Shan State) prefer stickier, lower-amylose varieties like kauk hnyin and kauk sei, while consumers in lower delta regions preferring higher-amylose varieties like kauk chaw and kauk kyan. Lower-amylose varieties of rice are commonly used in traditional Burmese snacks called mont. While rice is traditionally eaten plain, flavored versions like buttered rice and coconut rice are commonplace festive staples.

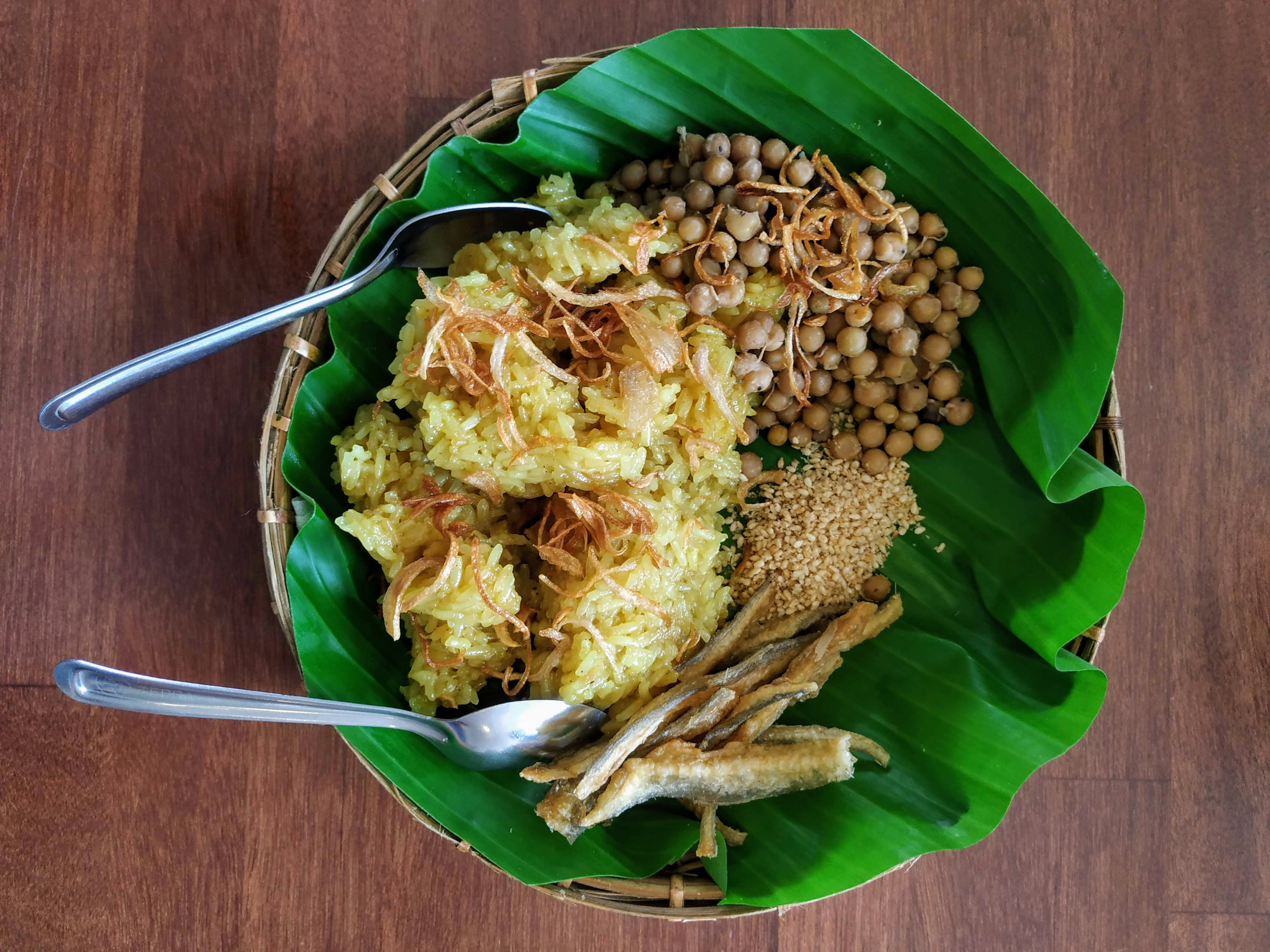
Hsi htamin, glutinous rice seasoned with oil and turmeric, is a common breakfast food.

- Htamin gyaw (ထမင်းကြော် [tʰəmɪ́ɴ dʒɔ̀]) – fried rice with boiled peas, sometimes with meat, sausage, and eggs.
- San byok (ဆန်ပြုတ် [sʰàɴbjoʊʔ]) – rice congee with fish, chicken or duck often fed to invalids.
- Danbauk (ဒံပေါက် [dàɴbaʊʔ], from Persian dum pukht) – Burmese-style biryani with either chicken or mutton served with mango pickle, a fresh salad of sliced onions, julienned cabbage, sliced cucumbers, fermented limes and lemons, fried dried chilies, and soup
- Htamin jin (ထမင်းချဉ်‌ [tʰəmíɴ dʒɪ̀ɴ]) – a rice, tomato and potato or fish salad kneaded into round balls dressed and garnished with crisp fried onion in oil, tamarind sauce, coriander and spring onions often with garlic, Chinese chive roots, fried whole dried chili, grilled dried fermented bean cakes (pé bok) and fried dried tofu (tohu gyauk kyaw) on the side
- Thingyan rice (သင်္ကြန်ထမင်း [ðədʒàɴ tʰəmɪ́ɴ]) – fully boiled rice in candle-smelt water served with pickled marian plums

=== Noodles ===
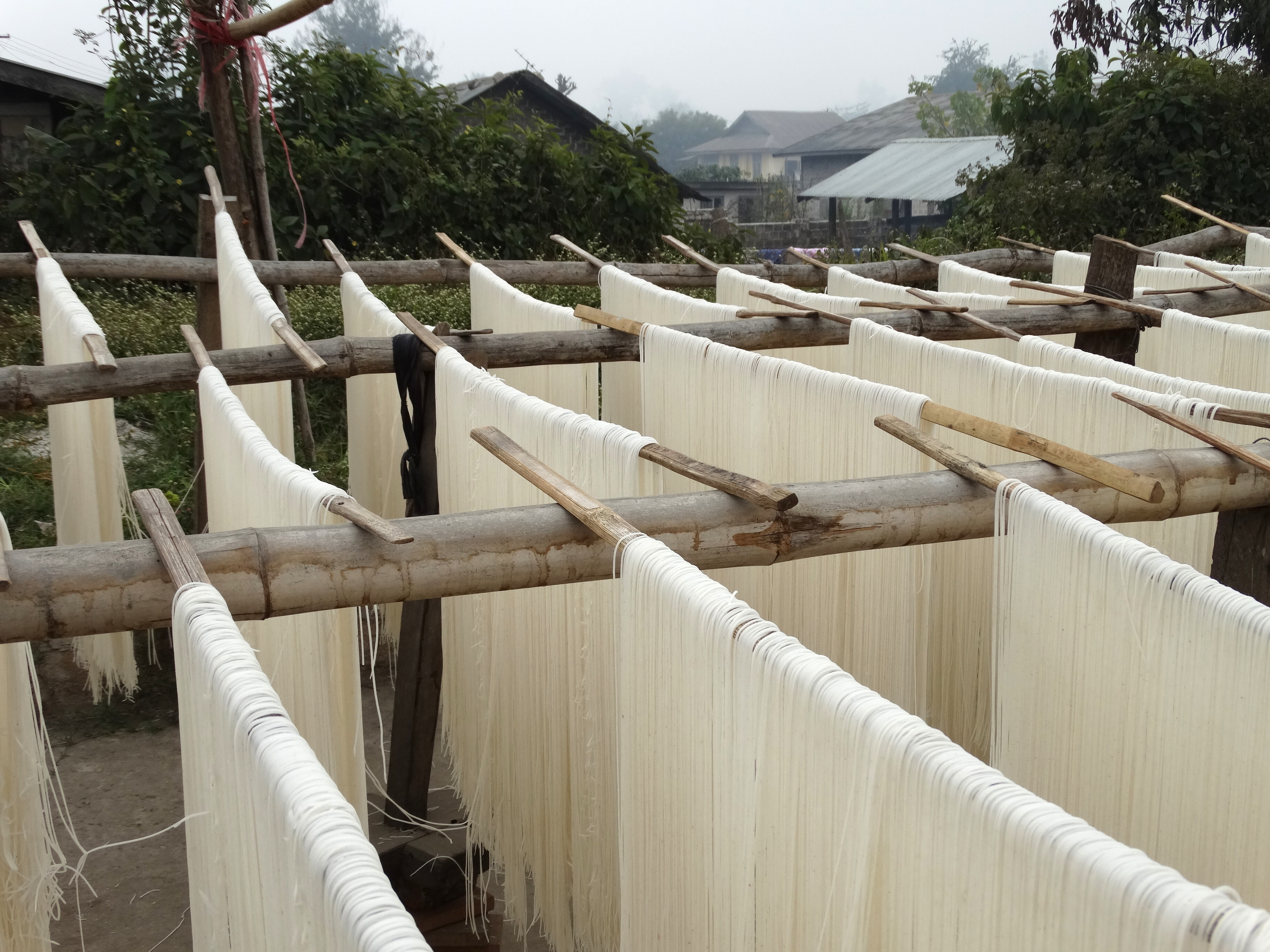
Rice noodles sun-drying in Hsipaw

Burmese cuisine uses a wide variety of noodles, which are prepared in soups, salads, or other dry noodle dishes and typically eaten outside of lunch or as a snack. Fresh, thin rice noodles called mont bat (မုန့်ဖတ်) or mont di (မုန့်တီ), are similar to Thai khanom chin, and feature in Myanmar's national dish, mohinga. Burmese cuisine also has a category of rice noodles of varying sizes and shapes called nan, including nangyi (နန်းကြီး), thick udon-like noodles; nanlat (နန်းလတ်), medium-sized rice noodles; nanthe (နန်းသေး), thinner rice noodles; and nanbya (နန်းပြား), flat rice noodles. Cellophane noodles, called kyazan (ကြာဆံ, lit. 'lotus thread'), and wheat-based noodles, called khauk swe (ခေါက်ဆွဲ), are often used in salads, soups, and stir-fries.

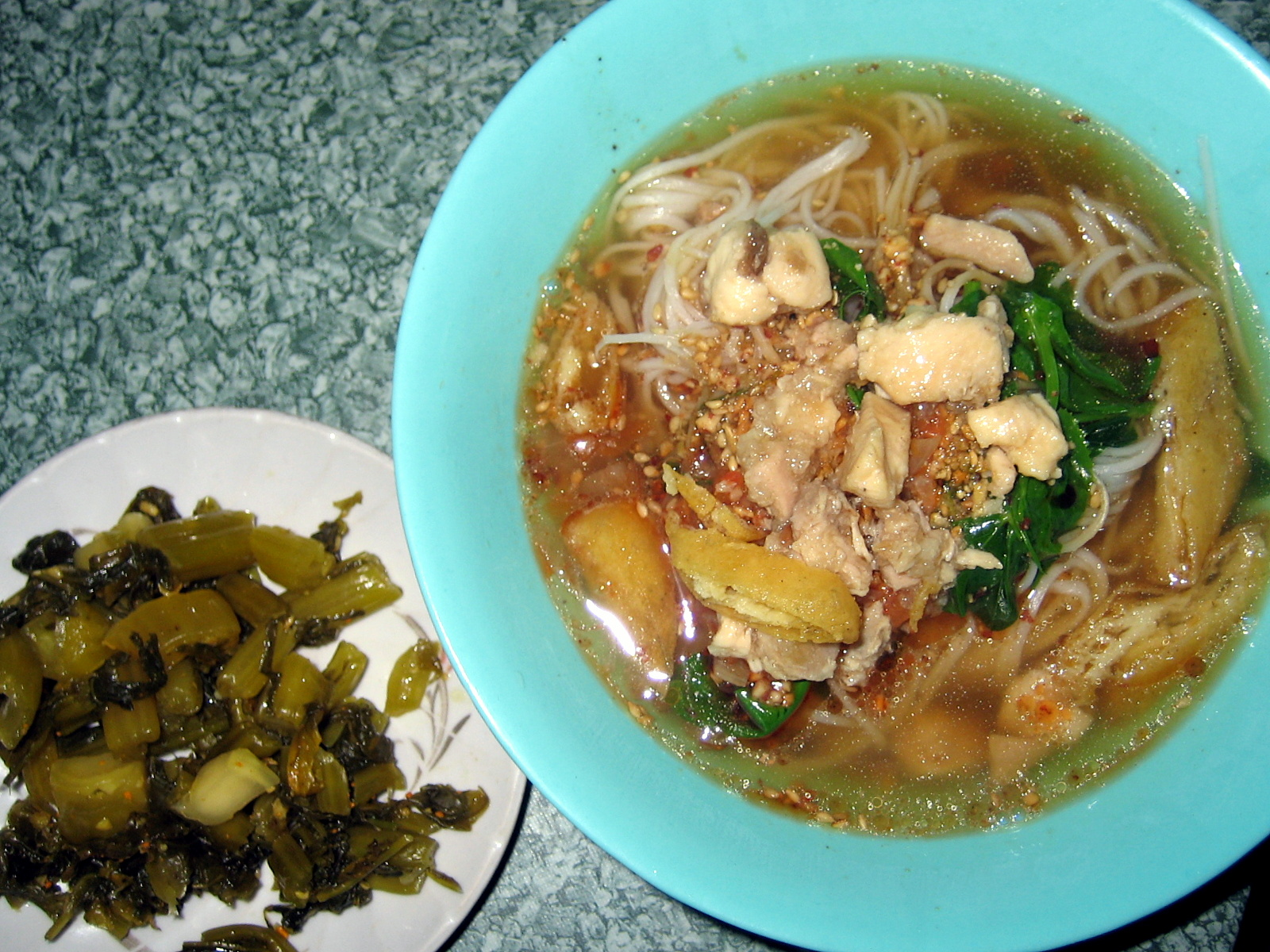
Shan khao swè and tohpu jaw, with monnyin gyin on the side

Dry or fried noodle dishes include:

- Kat kyi kaik (ကတ်ကြေးကိုက် [kaʔtɕígaɪʔ], lit. 'bitten with scissors') – a southern coastal dish (from the Dawei area) of flat rice noodles with a variety of seafood, land meats, raw bean sprouts, beans and fried eggs, comparable to pad thai
- Meeshay (မြီးရှည် [mjíʃè]) – rice noodles with pork or chicken, bean sprouts, rice flour gel, rice flour fritters, dressed with soy sauce, salted soybean, rice vinegar, fried peanut oil, chilli oil, and garnished with crisp fried onions, crushed garlic, coriander, and pickled white radish/mustard greens
- Mont di – an extremely popular and economical fast-food dish where rice vermicelli are either eaten with some condiments and soup prepared from ngapi, or as a salad with powdered fish and some condiments.
- Panthay khao swè (ပန်းသေးခေါက်ဆွဲ [páɴðé kʰaʊʔ sʰwɛ́]) – halal egg noodles with a spiced chicken curry. The dish is associated with Panthay community, a group of Burmese Chinese Muslims.
- Sigyet khauk swè (ဆီချက်ခေါက်ဆွဲ [sʰìdʑɛʔ kʰaʊʔ sʰwɛ́]) – wheat noodles with duck or pork, fried garlic oil, soy sauce and chopped spring onions. The dish originated from with the Sino-Burmese community

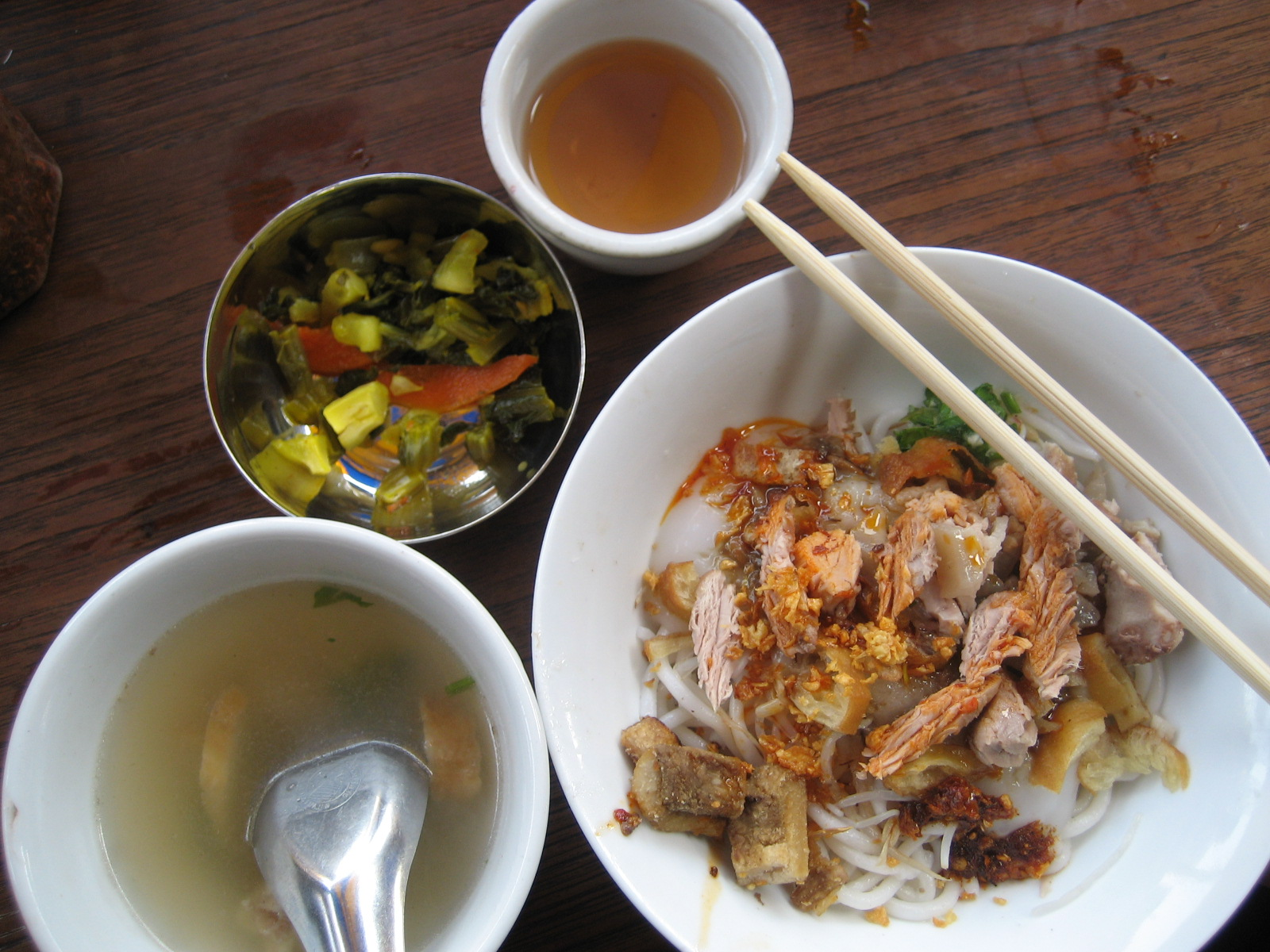
Mandalay meeshay, served with a thin hingyo broth

Noodle soups include:

- Mohinga (မုန့်ဟင်းခါး [mo̰ʊɴhíɰ̃ɡá]) – the unofficial national dish, made with fresh thin rice noodles in a fish broth with onions, garlic, ginger, lemon grass and tender banana stem cores, served with boiled eggs, fried fishcake and Burmese fritters
- Ohn-no khauk swè (အုန်းနို့ခေါက်ဆွဲ [ʔóʊɴno̰ kʰaʊʔsʰwɛ́]) – curried chicken and wheat noodles in a coconut milk broth. It is comparable to Malaysian laksa and Northern Thai khao soi
- Kyay oh (ကြေးအိုး [tʃé ʔó]) – rice noodles in a broth of pork offal and egg, traditionally served in copper pot
- Kawyei khao swè (ကော်ရည်ခေါက်ဆွဲ [kɔ̀ jè kʰaʊʔ sʰwɛ́]) – noodles and duck (or pork) curried with five-spice powder in broth with eggs, comparable to Singaporean/Malaysian lor mee
- Mi swan (မြူစွမ် [mjù swàɴ]) – thin wheat noodles, known as misua in Singapore and Malaysia. It is a popular option for invalids, usually with chicken broth.
- Shan khauk swé (ရှမ်းခေါက်ဆွဲ [ʃáɴ kʰaʊʔsʰwɛ́]) – rice noodles with chicken or minced pork, onions, garlic, tomatoes, chili, crushed roasted peanuts, young snowpea vine, served with tofu fritters, and pickled mustard greens
- Tofu Nway (တိုဖူးနွေး; Shan: တူဝ်းဖူယုင်; literally "warm tofu") – a warm, creamy Shan tofu dish made from yellow split peas.

=== Salads ===
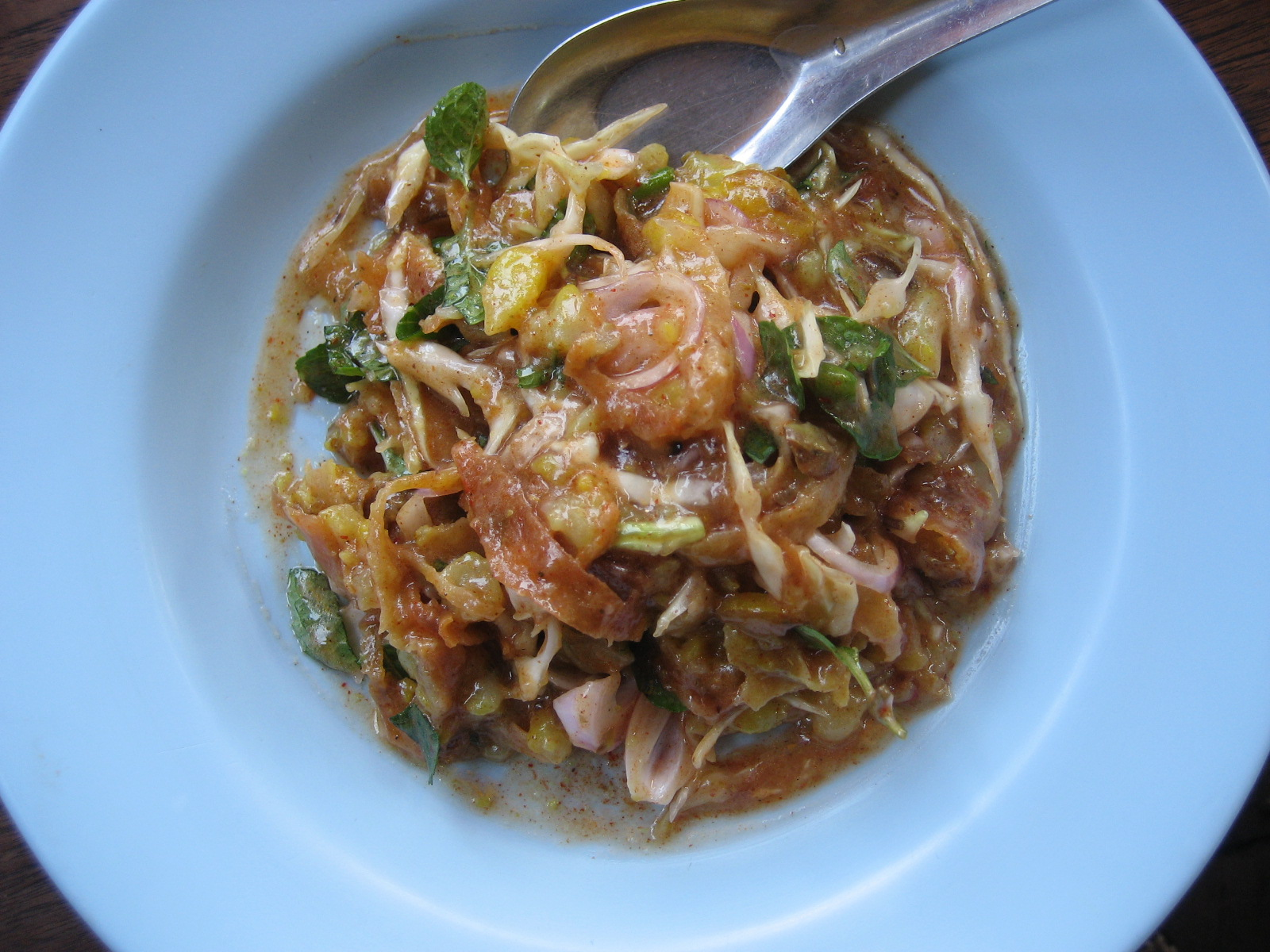
Samosa salad in Mandalay

Burmese salads (အသုပ်; transliterated athoke or athouk) are a diverse category of indigenous salads in Burmese cuisine. Burmese salads are made of cooked and raw ingredients that are mixed by hand to combine and balance a wide-ranging array of flavors and textures. Burmese salads are eaten as standalone snacks, as side dishes paired with Burmese curries, and as entrees.

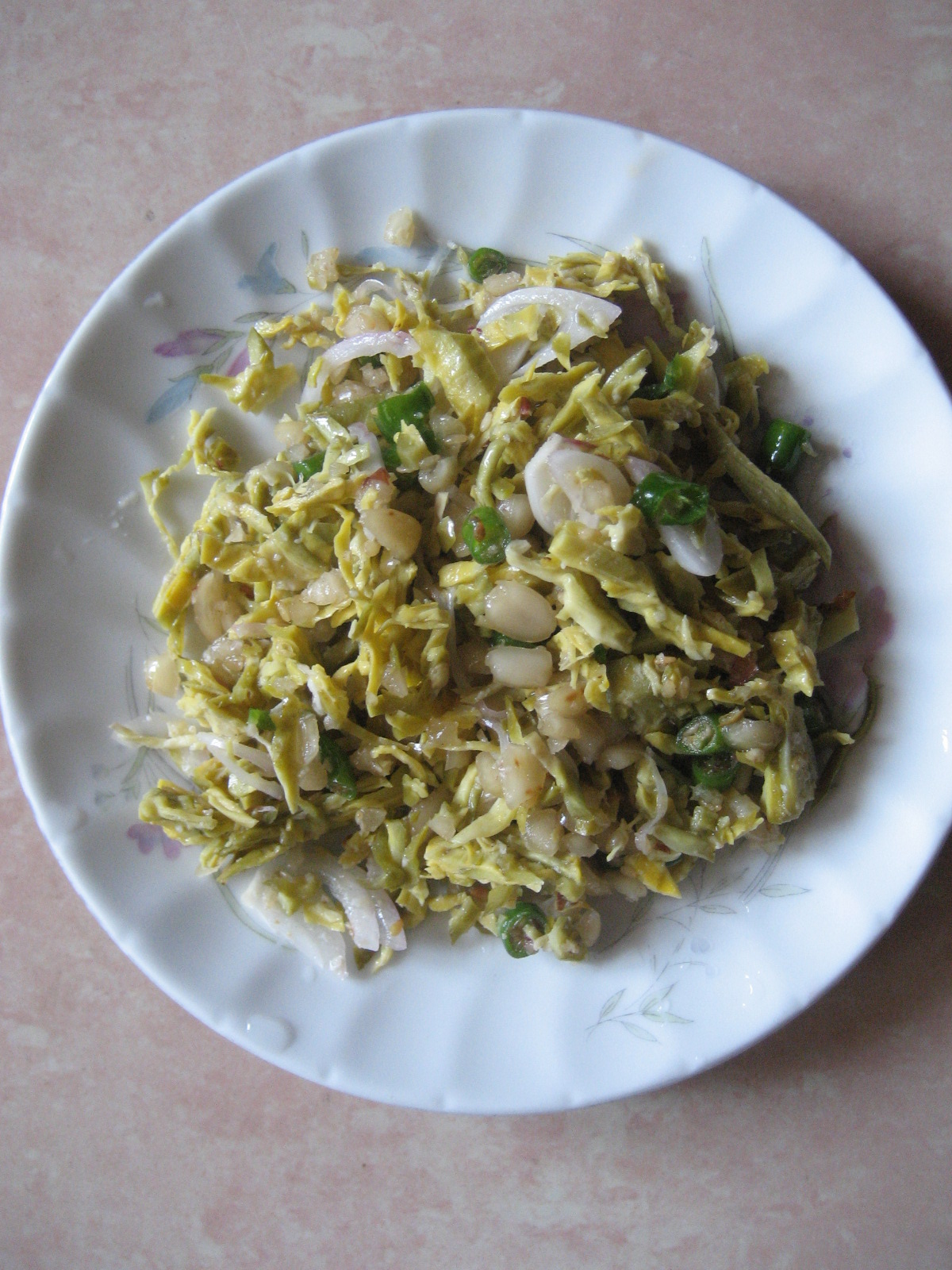
Thayet chin thoke – fermented green mango salad with onions, green chilli, roasted peanuts, sesame and peanut oil

- Lahpet thoke (လက်ဖက်သုပ် [ləpʰɛʔ ðoʊʔ]) – a salad of pickled tea leaves with fried peas, peanuts and garlic, toasted sesame, fresh garlic, tomato, green chili, crushed dried shrimps, preserved ginger and dressed with peanut oil, fish sauce and lime
- Gyin thoke (ချင်းသုပ်‌ [dʒɪ́ɰ̃ ðoʊʔ]) – a salad of pickled ginger with sesame seeds
- Khauk swè thoke (ခေါက်ဆွဲသုပ် [kʰaʊʔsʰwɛ́ ðoʊʔ]) – wheat noodle salad with dried shrimps, shredded cabbage and carrots, dressed with fried peanut oil, fish sauce and lime
- Let thoke son (လက်သုပ်စုံ [lɛʔ θoʊʔzòʊɴ]) – similar to htamin thoke with shredded green papaya, shredded carrot, ogonori sea moss and often wheat noodles
- Nan gyi thoke (နန်းကြီးသုပ် [náɰ̃dʒí ðoʊʔ]) or Mandalay mont di, thick rice noodle salad with chickpea flour, chicken, fish cake, onions, coriander, spring onions, crushed dried chilli, dressed with fried crispy onion oil, fish sauce and lime
- Samusa thoke (စမူဆာသုပ် [səmùsʰà ðoʊʔ]) – samosa salad with onions, cabbage, fresh mint, potato curry, masala, chili powder, salt and lime
- Kya zan thoke – glass vermicelli salad with boiled prawn julienne and mashed curried duck eggs and potatoes

=== Curries ===
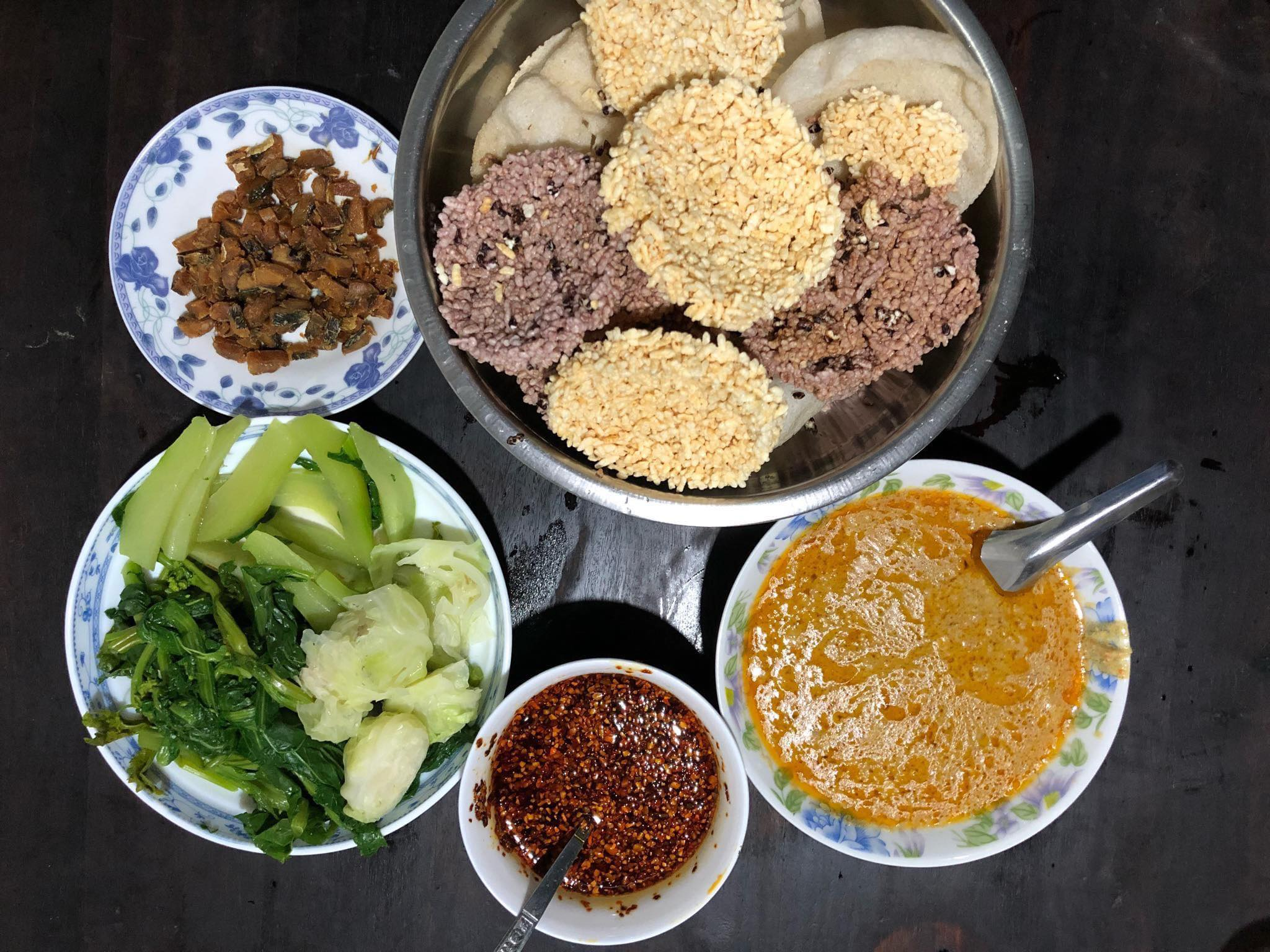
A traditional Danu-style meal featuring a curry broth, rice disks, and a requisite plate of blanched vegetables and dip

Burmese curry refers to a diverse array of dishes in Burmese cuisine that consist of protein or vegetables simmered or stewed in an base of aromatics. Burmese curries generally differ from other Southeast Asian curries (e.g., Thai curry) in that Burmese curries make use of dried spices, in addition to fresh herbs and aromatics, and are often milder. The most common variety of curry is called sibyan (ဆီပြန်; lit. 'oil returns'), which is typified by a layer of oil that separates from the gravy and meat after cooked. Pork, chicken, goat, shrimp, and fish are commonly prepared in Burmese curries.

- Pork sibyan (ဝက်သားဆီပြန်) – classic Burmese curry with fatty cuts of pork
- Chicken sibyan (ကြက်သားဆီပြန်) – the classic Burmese curry, served with a thick gravy of aromatics
- Bachelor's chicken curry (ကြက်ကာလသားချက်) – a red and watery chicken curry cooked with calabash
- Goat hnat (ဆိတ်သားနှပ်) – a braised goat curry spiced with masala, cinnamon sticks, bay leaf, and cloves
- Nga thalaut paung (ငါးသလောက်ပေါင်း [ŋəθəlaʊʔbáʊɴ]) – a curry of hilsa fish and tomatoes, which is slowly simmered to melt the fish bones
- Egg curry (ဘဲဥချဥ်ရည်ဟင်း) – a sour curry made with hardboiled duck or chicken eggs, cooked in tamarind paste and mashed tomatoes

=== Soups ===
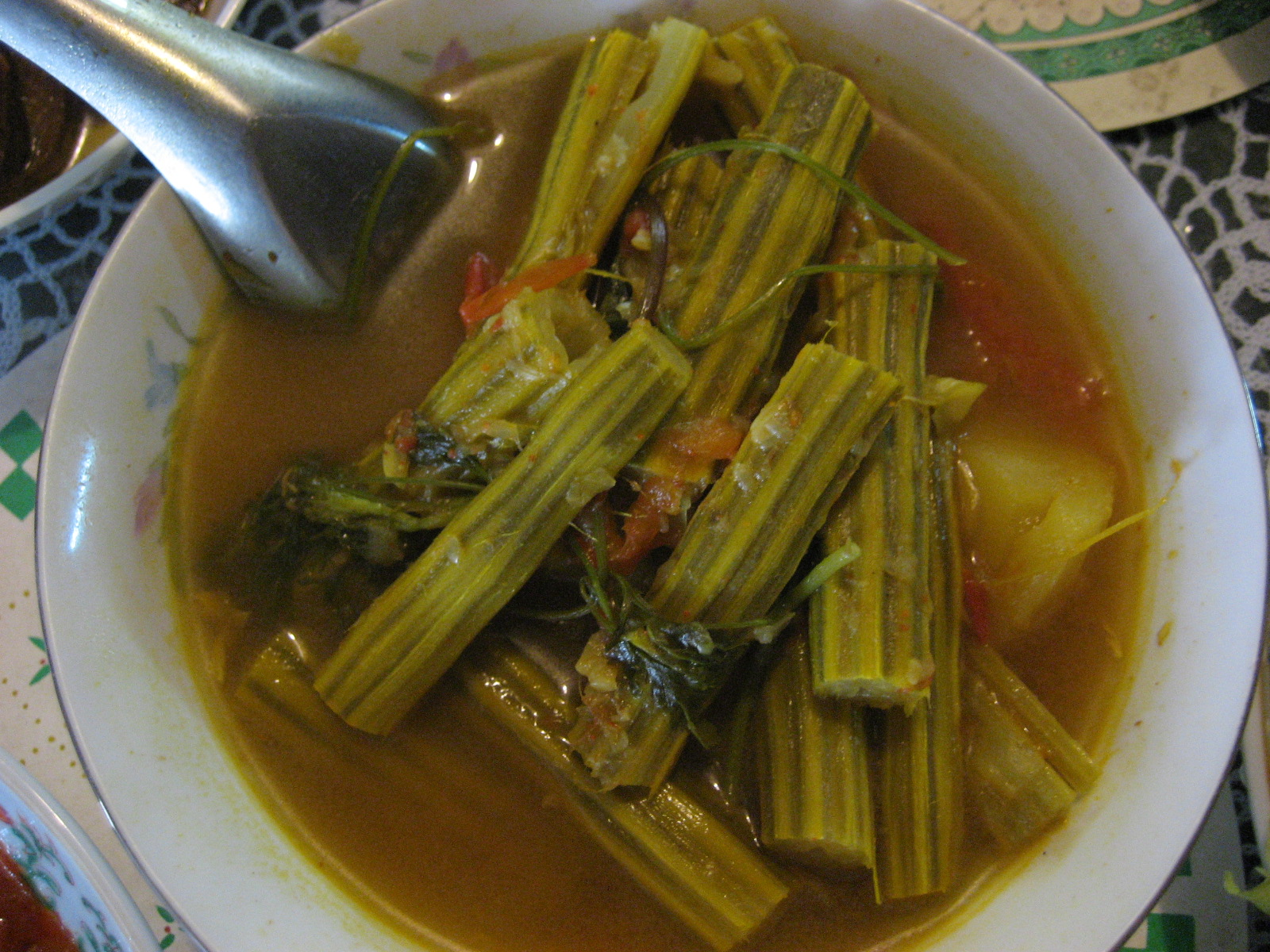
Dandalun chinyay, a sour soup with chopped drumsticks

In Burmese cuisine, soups typically accompany meals featuring both rice and noodles, and are paired accordingly to balance contrasting flavors. Lightly flavored soups, called hin gyo (ဟင်းချို) are served with saltier dishes, while sour soups, called chinyay hin (ချဉ်ရည်ဟင်း), are paired with rich, fatty Burmese curries.

Thizon chinyay (သီးစုံချဉ်ရည် [θízòʊɴ tʃìɴjè], lit. 'sour soup of assorted vegetables'), cooked with drumstick, lady's finger, eggplant, green beans, potato, onions, ginger, dried chilli, boiled eggs, dried salted fish, fish paste and tamarind, is an elevated version of chinyay hin, and served during festive occasions.

=== Other grains and breads ===
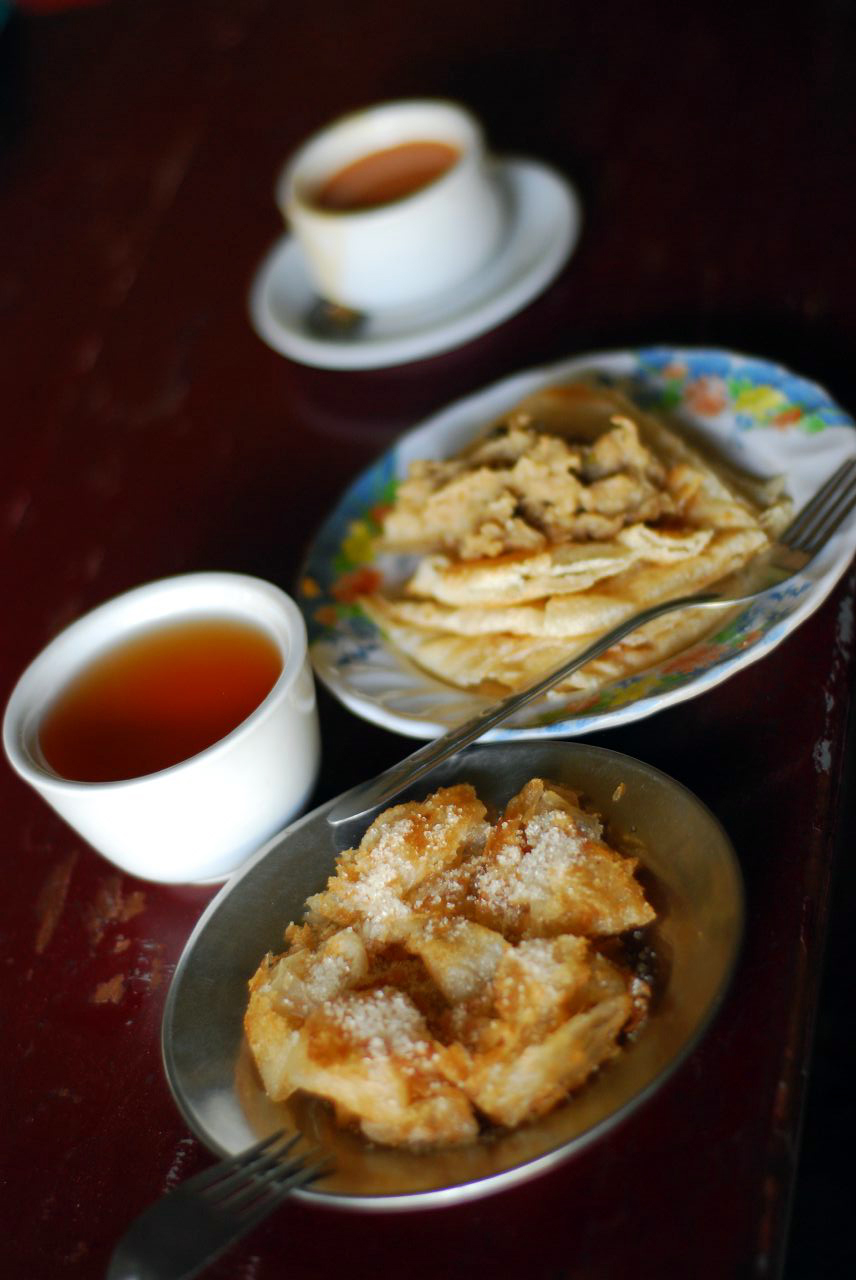
Palata is commonly dusted with sugar as a dessert or teatime snack.

Indian breads are commonly eaten for breakfast or teatime in Myanmar. Palata (ပလာတာ), also known as htattaya (ထပ်တစ်ရာ), a flaky fried flatbread related to Indian paratha, is often eaten with curried meats or as dessert with sprinkled sugar, while nanbya (နံပြား), a baked flatbread, is eaten with any Indian dishes. Other favorites include aloo poori (အာလူးပူရီ), chapati (ချပါတီ), and appam (အာပုံ).

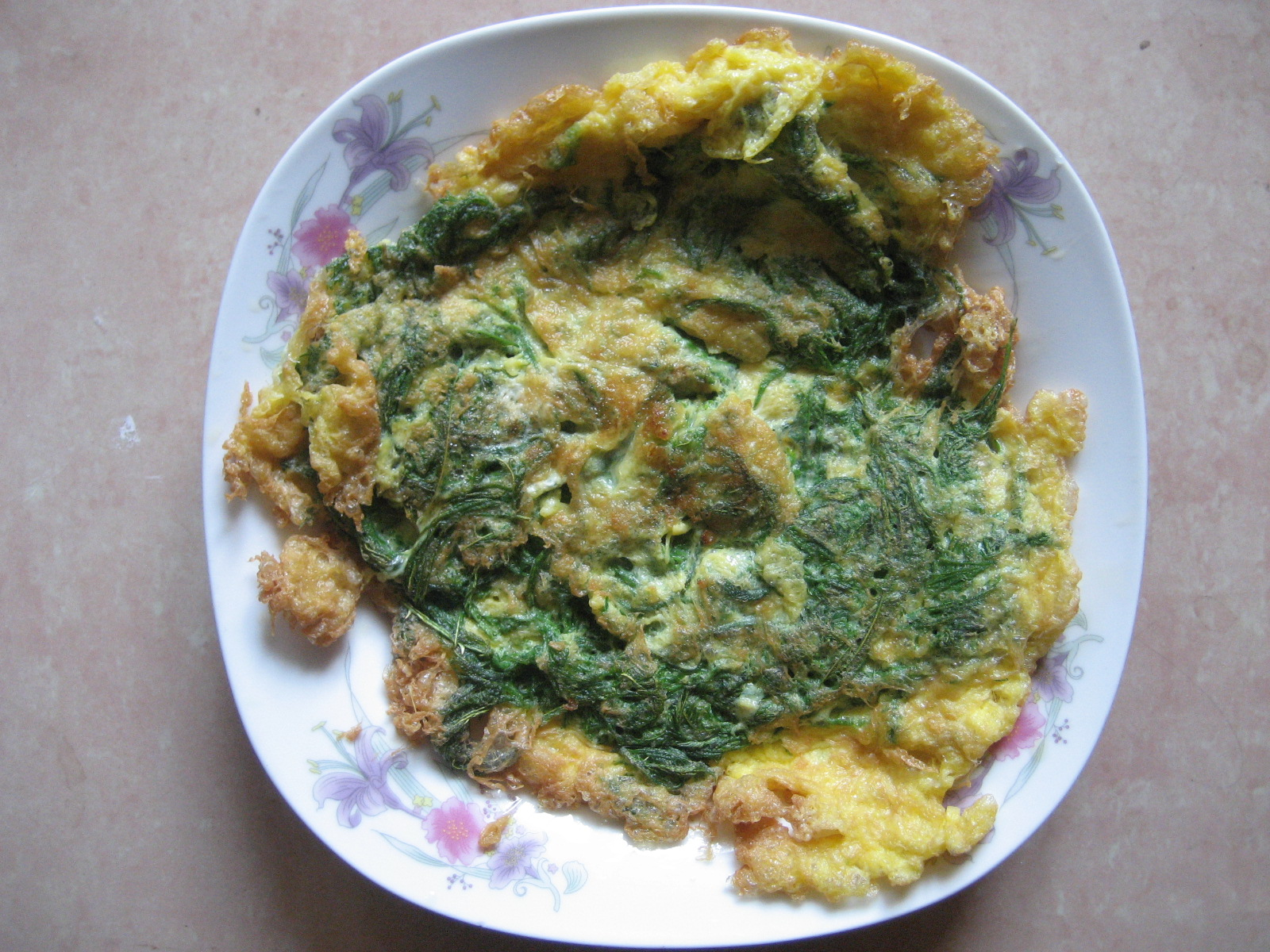
Burmese-style omelette fried with acacia leaves

Other dishes include:

- Burmese tofu (ရှမ်းတို့ဟူး [ʃáɴ tòhú]) – a tofu of Shan origin made from chickpea flour, eaten as fritters, in a salad, or in porridge forms
- A sein kyaw (အစိမ်းကြော် [ʔəséɪɴdʒɔ̀]) – cabbage, cauliflower, carrot, green beans, baby corn, corn flour or tapioca starch, tomatoes, squid sauce
- Ngapi daung (ငါးပိထောင်း) – a spicy Rakhine-style condiment made from pounded ngapi and green chili
- Nga baung htoke (ငါးပေါင်းထုပ် [ŋəbáʊɴ doʊʔ]) – a Mon-style steamed parcel of mixed vegetables and prawns, wrapped in morinda and banana leaves
- Wet tha chin (ဝက်သားချဉ် [wɛʔ θə dʑɪ̀ɴ]) – Shan-style preserved minced pork in rice

=== Snacks ===
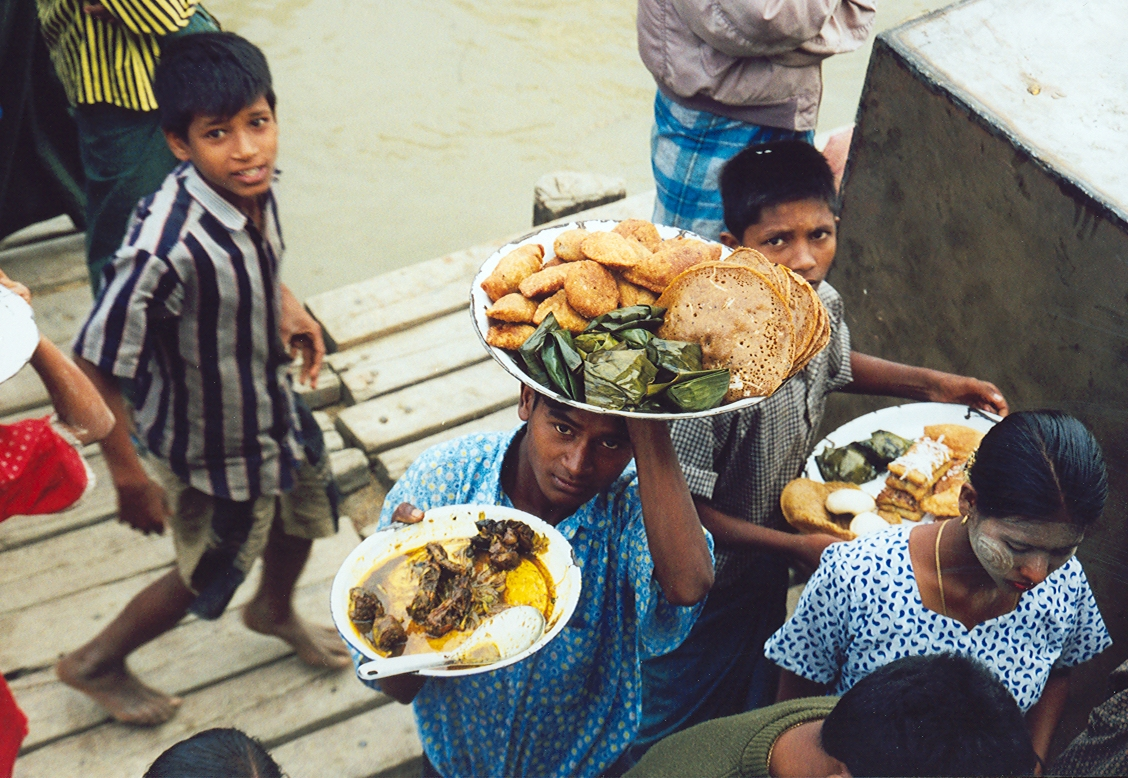
A street hawker in Ponnagyun selling an assortment of fritters and mont to passersby

Burmese cuisine has a wide variety of traditional snacks called mont, ranging from sweet desserts to savory food items that are steamed, baked, fried, deep-fried, or boiled. Traditional Burmese fritters, consisting of vegetables or seafood that have been battered and deep-fried, are also eaten as snacks or as toppings.

Savory snacks include:

- Hpet htok (lit. 'leaf wrap', ဖက်ထုပ် [pʰɛʔtʰoʊʔ]) – meat, pastry paper, ginger, garlic, pepper powder, and salt. Usually served with soup or noodles.
- Samusa (စမူဆာ [səmùzà]) – Burmese-style samosa with mutton and onions served with fresh mint, green chilli, onions and lime
- Burmese pork offal skewers (ဝက်သား တုတ်ထိုး [wɛʔθá doʊʔtʰó]) – pork offal cooked in light soy sauce, and eaten with raw ginger and chili sauce.
- Htamane (ထမနဲ [tʰəmənɛ́]) – dessert made from glutinous rice, shredded coconuts and peanuts

Sweet snacks include:

- Mont let hsaung (မုန့်လက်ဆောင်း [mo̰ʊɴlɛʔsʰáʊɴ]) – tapioca or rice noodles, glutinous rice, grated coconut and toasted sesame with jaggery syrup in coconut milk
- Sanwin makin (ဆနွင်းမကင်း [sʰà.nwɪ́ɴ məgɪ́ɴ]) – semolina cake with raisins, walnuts and poppy seeds
- Shwe yin aye (ရွှေရင်အေး [ʃwè jɪ̀ɴ ʔé]) – agar jelly, tapioca and sago in coconut milk
- Pathein halawa (ပုသိမ်ဟာလဝါ [pəθèɪɴ ha̰ləwà]) – a sticky sweetmeat made of glutinous rice, butter, coconut milk, inspired by Indian halwa
- Hpaluda (ဖာလူဒါ [pʰàlùdà]) – rose water, milk, coconut jelly, coconut shavings, sometimes served with egg custard and ice cream, similar to Indian falooda
- Ngapyaw baung (ငှက်ပျောပေါင်း) – A Mon-style dessert of bananas stewed in milk and coconut, and garnished with black sesame
- Saw hlaing mont (စောလှိုင်မုန့်) – a Rakhine-style baked sweet, made from millet, raisins, coconut and butter

=== Fruits and fruit preserves ===
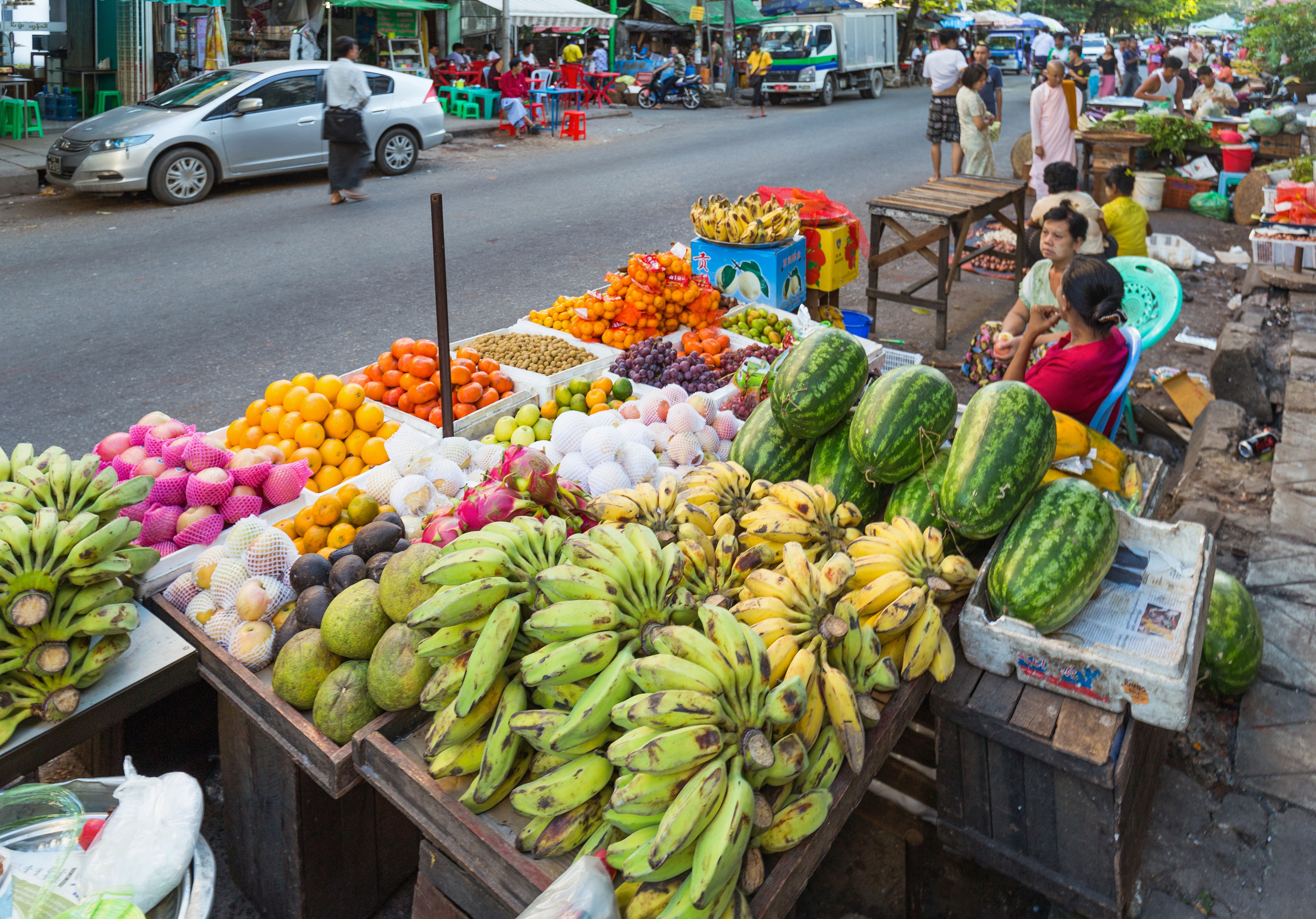
A street-side fruit stall in Yangon

Myanmar has a wide range of fruits, mostly of tropical origin. Fruit is commonly eaten as a snack or dessert. While most fruits are eaten fresh, a few, including jengkol, are boiled, roasted or otherwise cooked. Popular fruits include banana, mango, watermelon, papaya, jujube, avocado, pomelo, and guava. Others include marian plum, mangosteen, sugar-apple, rambutan, durian, jackfruit, lychee, and pomegranate. Some fruits, including green mangoes, plums, and guavas, are traditionally eaten before they ripen, often mixed with chili powder and salt.

Burmese fruit preserves, called yo (ယို), are also commonly eaten as standalone snacks. Common ones include fruit preserves made from fig, jujube, marian plum, citrus, mango, pineapple, and durian.

300 cultivars of mango are grown in Myanmar, including seintalon (စိန်တစ်လုံး, lit. 'one diamond'), Ma Chit Su (မချစ်စု), and mya kyauk (မြကျောက်, lit. 'emerald stone'). 13 species of banana are locally cultivated in Myanmar, including the following cultivars:

- Red – locally called shweni (ရွှေနီ, lit. 'golden red')
- Dwarf Cavendish – locally called htawbat (သီးမွှေး, lit. 'fragrant fruit')
- Mysore – locally called Rakhine (ရခိုင်), sweet and rounder in shape
- Latundan – locally called htawbat (ထောပတ်, lit. 'butter')

== Beverages ==
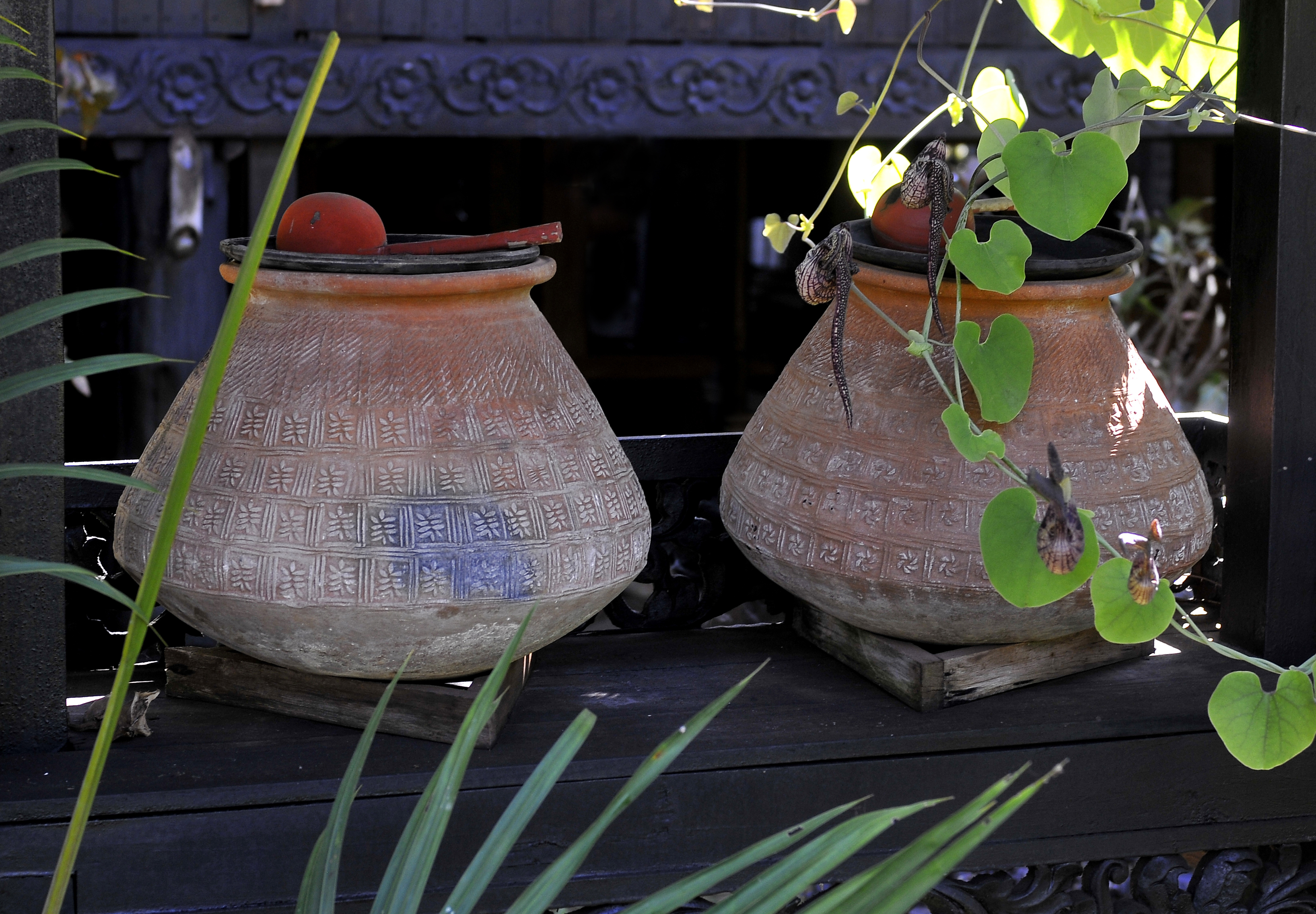
Clay pots containing drinking water are commonly seen throughout Myanmar, left for travellers and passersby to rehydrate.

Tea is the national drink of Myanmar, reflecting the influence of Buddhism and its views on temperance. Tea is central to Burmese dining culture; complimentary green tea is customarily served to diners at restaurants and teashops alike. Various liquid concoctions made from fruits and coconut milk, including sugarcane juice, and mont let hsaung (မုန့်လက်ဆောင်း) are also popular. Indigenous fermented drinks like palm wine are also found across the country. During a traditional Burmese meal, drinks are not often served; instead, the usual liquid refreshment is a light broth or consommé served from a communal bowl.

=== Burmese tea ===
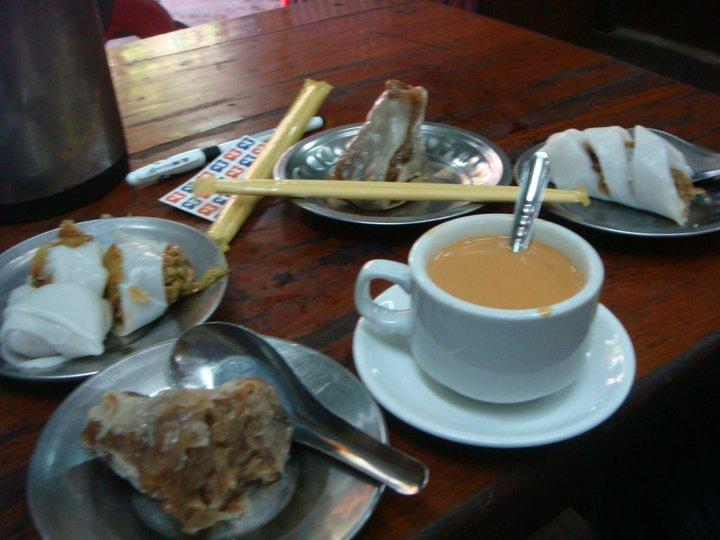
Snacks served at a Burmese tea house alongside Burmese milk tea

Plain green tea, yay nway gyan (ရေနွေးကြမ်း, lit. 'crude tea water'), is a popular form of tea drunk in Myanmar. Tea leaves are traditionally cultivated in Shan State and Kachin State. Milk tea, called laphet yay cho (လက်ဖက်ရည်ချို), made with strongly brewed black tea leaves, and sweetened with a customized ratio of condensed milk and evaporated milk, is also popular.

=== Alcohol ===
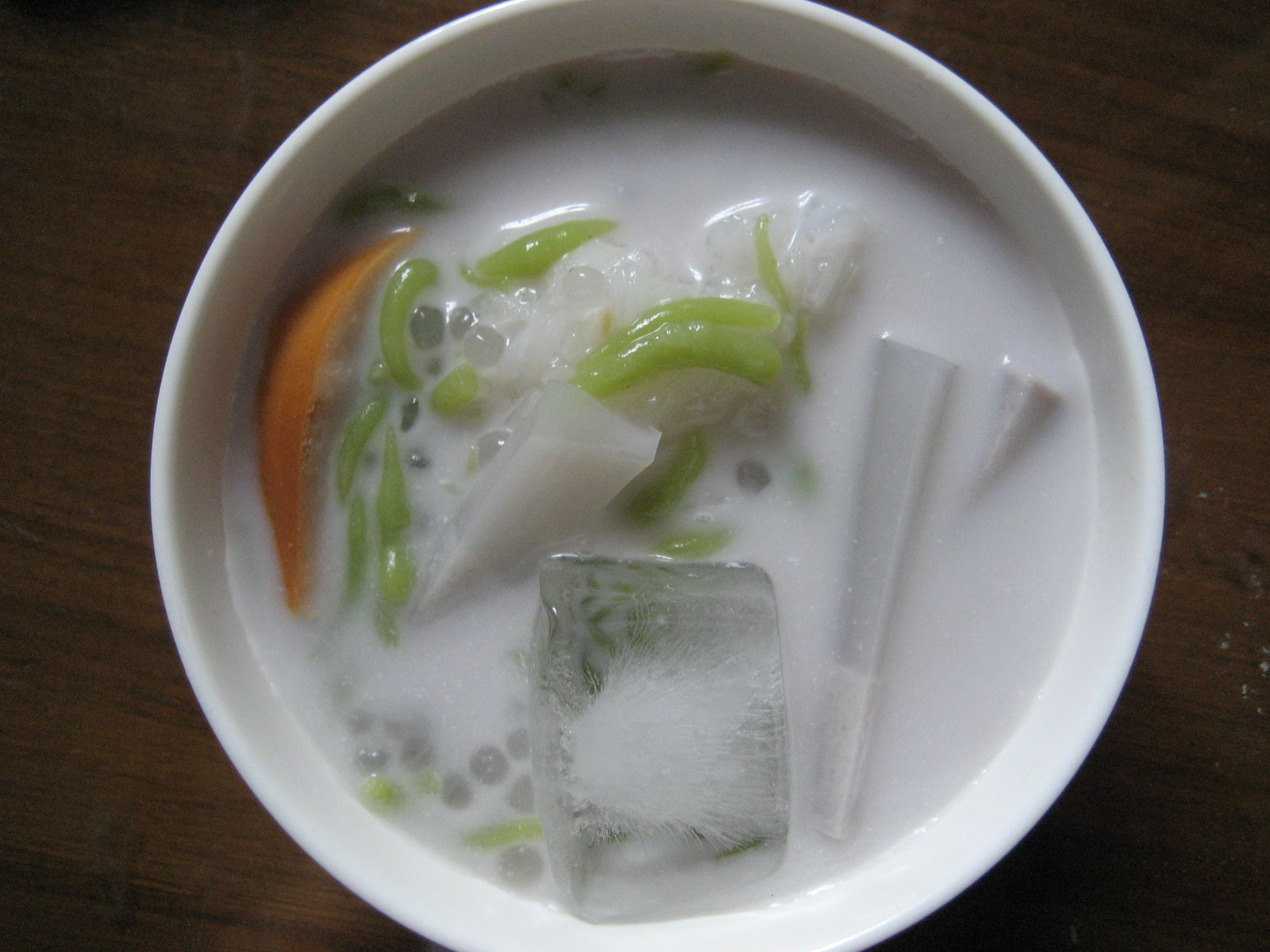
Shwe yin aye is a popular and refreshing dessert.

Palm wine, called htan yay (ထန်းရည်), made from the fermented sap of the toddy palm, is traditionally consumed in rural parts of Upper Myanmar Ethnic communities, including the Kachin and Shan, also brew local moonshines. Several ethnic minorities traditionally brew alcoholic beverages using rice or glutinous rice called khaung (ခေါင်ရည်). The khaung of the Chin peoples is brewed using millet seeds. Locally brewed beers include Irrawaddy, Mandalay, Myanmar, and Tiger.

== Food establishments ==
=== Restaurants ===
Dine-in restaurants that serve steamed rice with traditional Burmese curries and dishes are called htamin hsaing (ထမင်းဆိုင်; lit. 'rice shop'). At traditional curry shops, soup is typically served complimentary, alongside pickled and raw vegetables, chutneys and various seasonings.

=== Tea shops ===
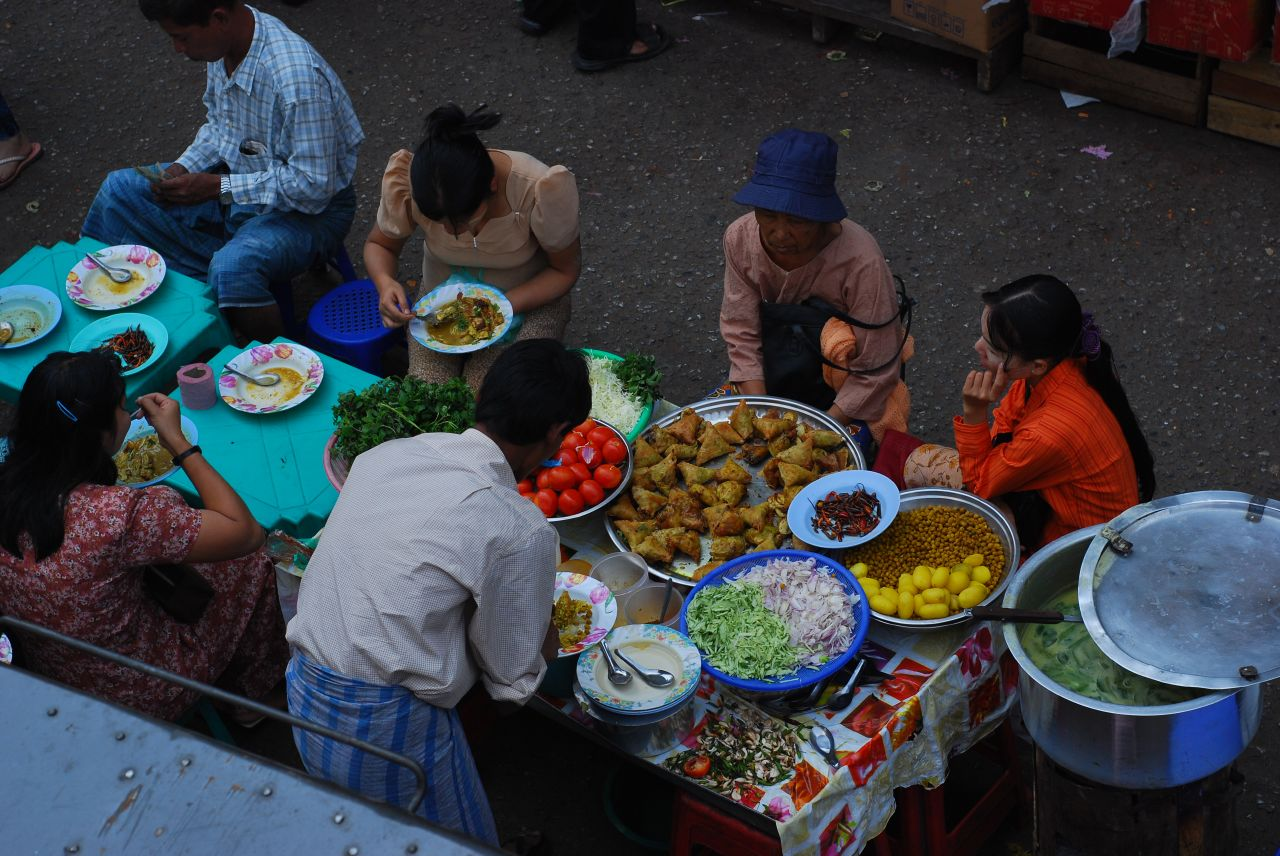
An outdoor café in Yangon

During British rule in Burma, Burmese Indians introduced tea shops to the country, first known as kaka hsaing, which later evolved into tea shops called laphet yay hsaing (လက်ဖက်ရည်ဆိုင်) or kaphi (ကဖီး), the latter word from French café. Burmese tea shop culture emerged from a combination of British, Indian, and Chinese influences throughout the colonial period. Tea shops are prevalent across the country, forming an important part of communal life. Typically open throughout the day, some Burmese tea shops cater to locals, long-distance drivers and travellers alike. The Burmese typically gather in tea shops to drink milk tea served with an extensive array of snacks and meals.

=== Street food ===
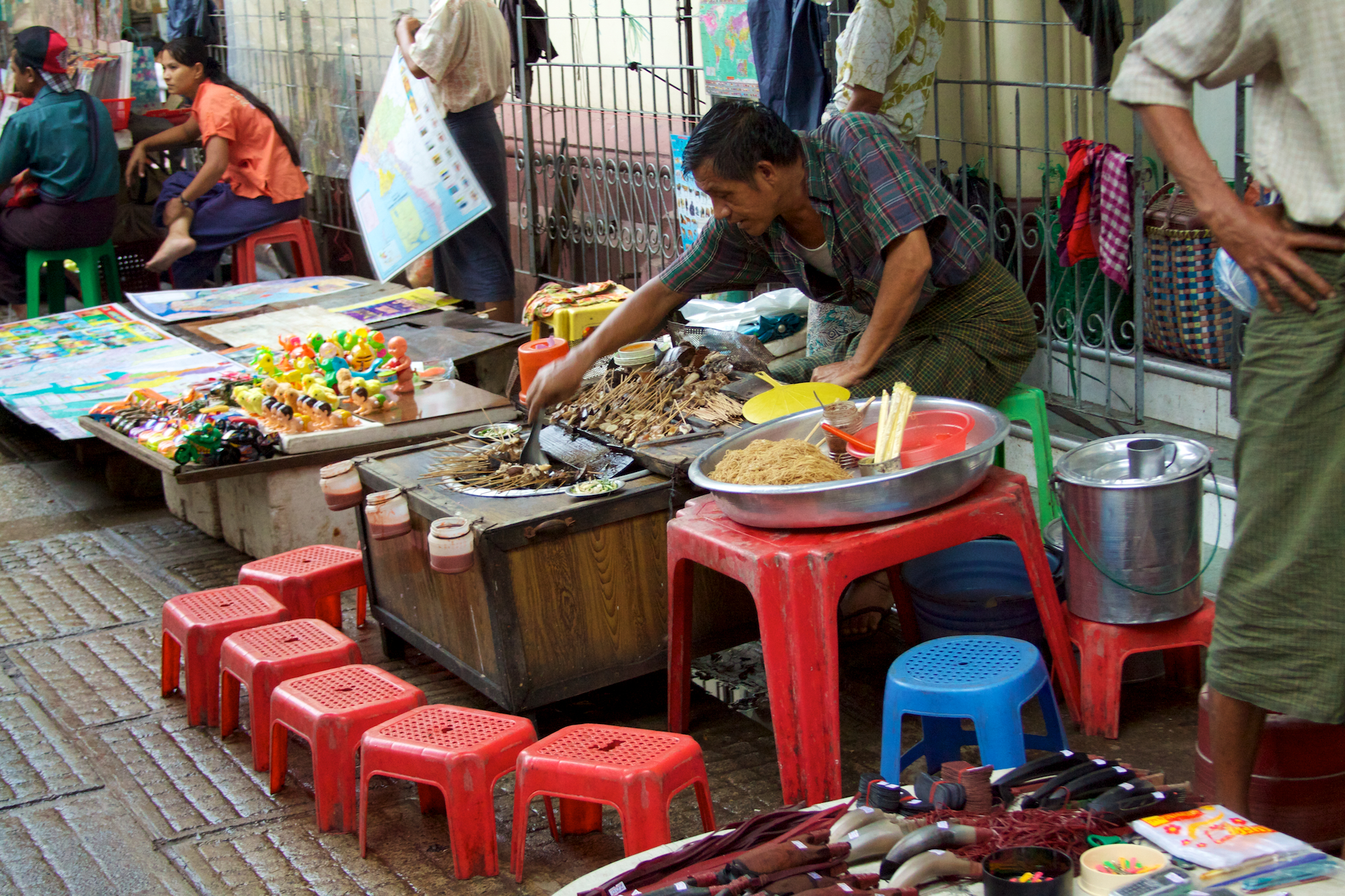
A street hawker selling Burmese pork offal skewers

Street food stalls and hawkers are a feature of the Burmese urban landscape, especially in major cities like Yangon. Burmese salads, snacks, and fritters are especially popular street foods. In recent years, some major cities have clamped down on street food vendors. In 2016, Yangon banned the city's 6,000 street vendors from selling food on major thoroughfares, and relocated them to formal night markets set up by the city.

Night markets, called nya zay (ညဈေး), are a feature of many Burmese towns and cities. Colonial observers as early as 1878 noted Burmese street hawkers selling delicacies, such as fruits, cakes, and laphet during "night bazaars". The streets surrounding major daytime markets, such as Zegyo Market in Mandalay, typically double as makeshift night markets during the evenings.

== See also ==
- Rice production in Myanmar
