= Burmese fried rice =

Fried rice dish

- Alternative names: htamin gyaw
- Type: Rice dish
- Place of origin: Myanmar (Burma)
- Region or state: Southeast Asia
- Associated cuisine: Burmese
- Main ingredients: white rice; boiled peas; onions; garlic

Burmese fried rice (Burmese: ထမင်း‌ကြော်, pronounced [tʰəmɪ́ɴ‌ d͡ʑɔ̀], htamin gyaw), also known as fried rice with boiled peas (Burmese: ပဲပြုတ်ထမင်း‌ကြော်) is the traditional Burmese recipe for fried rice. Burmese fried rice normally uses paw hsan hmwe, a Burmese fragrant short-grain rice (rounder and shorter than other varieties).

A popular plain version consists of rice, boiled peas, onions, garlic, and dark soy sauce. An accompanying condiment could be ngapi kyaw (fried fish paste with shredded flakes) and fresh cucumber strips mixed with chopped onions, green chili, and vinegar. The dish is a common breakfast meal in Myanmar, and can be optionally topped with a fried egg.
