= Milk rice =

Milk rice may refer to:

== Food ==
- Kiribath, a traditional dish made from rice in Sri Lankan cuisine
- No htamin, a festive rice dish in Burmese cuisine

== See also ==
- Coconut rice, a dish prepared by soaking white rice in coconut milk or cooking it with coconut flakes
- Rice pudding, a dish made from rice mixed with water or milk
- Rice milk, a plant milk made from rice
