= Htamin jin =

Burmese dish of fermented rice

Htamin chin
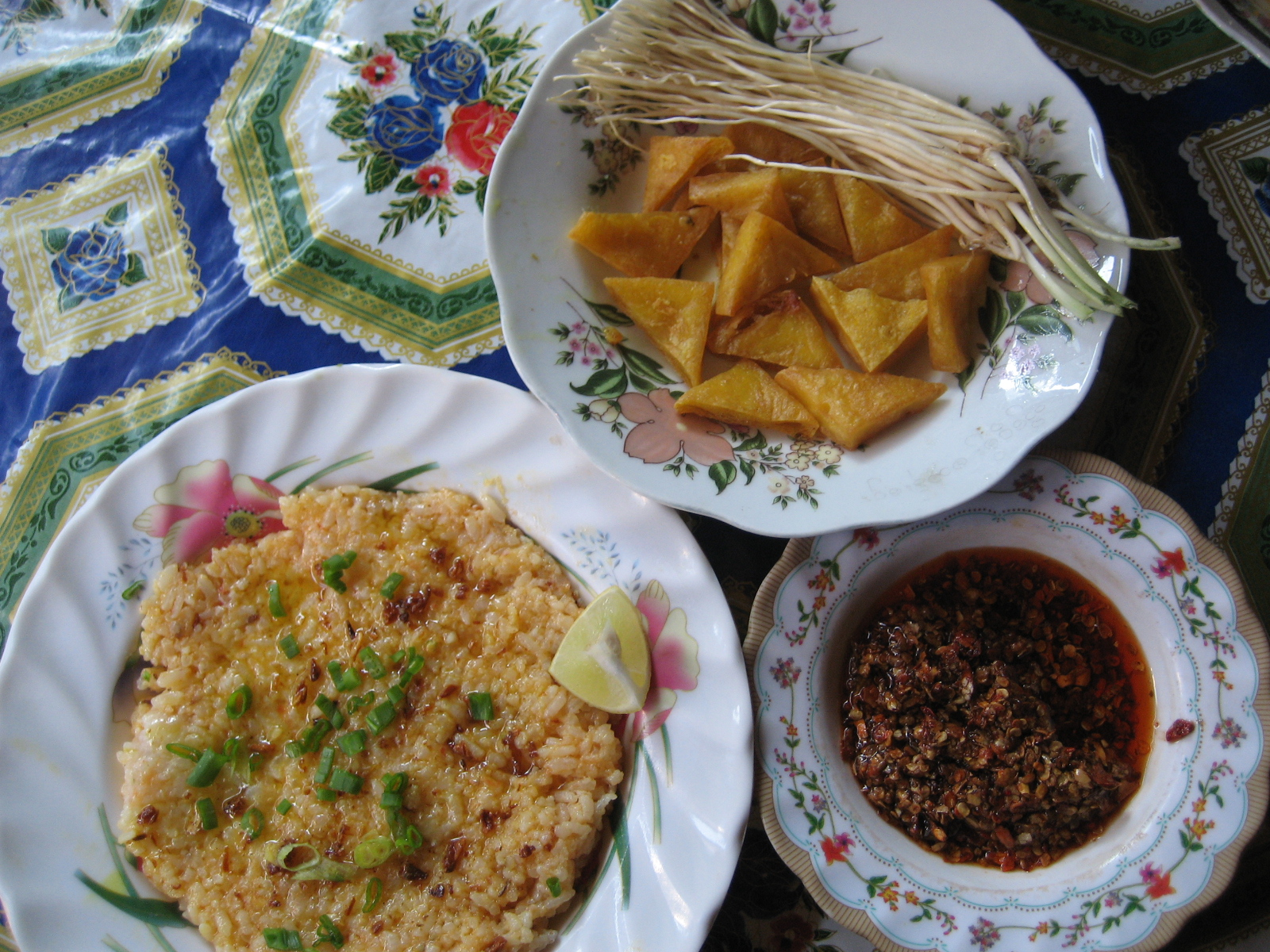
- Htamin jin from an Inle restaurant
- Alternative names: ထမင်းချဉ်‌
- Course: Breakfast, lunch
- Place of origin: Myanmar
- Region or state: Inle Lake, Shan State
- Main ingredients: Fermented rice, fish, tomato, potato, garlic chives, garlic oil, crispy garlic garnish

Htamin jin (Burmese: ထမင်းချဉ်‌, pronounced [tʰəmɪ́ɰ̃ dʑɪ̀ɰ̃]; also spelt htamin gyin; lit. 'sour rice') is a Burmese dish of fermented rice. It is the regional specialty and signature dish of the Intha people of Inle Lake in Shan State, Myanmar.

The dish consists of either fresh or fermented rice, kneaded with boiled fish (usually caught from the Inle Lake, such as nga gyin), fresh tomato paste, mashed boiled potatoes and garlic garnish. Highland Shan rice, similar to Japanese rice, is used alongside the creamier Shan potatoes, giving the dish a very rich texture.

Garlic chives roots, garlic oil and crispy garlic garnish are added as a final touch. Htamin jin is usually served with roasted chili flakes in oil.

== See also ==
- Cuisine of Burma
- Shan-inspired Burmese dishes
