= Pe htaw bhut htamin =

Burmese butter and lentil rice

- Alternative names: Butter rice Butter and lentil rice Buttered lentil rice
- Type: Starch
- Course: Main dish
- Place of origin: Myanmar (Burma)
- Associated cuisine: Burmese cuisine
- Main ingredients: long-grained rice; butter; bay leaves
- Ingredients generally used: cinnamon sticks; cardamom pods; cloves; raisins; cashew nut

Pe htaw bhut htamin (Burmese: ထောပတ်ထမင်း; IPA: [tʰɔ́baʔtʰəmɪ́ɴ], also known as butter rice or butter and lentil rice) is a festive rice dish in Burmese cuisine, typically associated with celebratory occasions like wedding receptions or almsgiving feasts. The rice dish is typically paired with a traditional Burmese chicken or mutton curry.

== Ingredients ==
Buttered rice uses long-grained paw hsan hmwe or basmati rice, and in its most basic form, is cooked with butter, lentils, and bay leaves. Cashew nuts and raisins may be added, and the dish can be spiced with cinnamon sticks, cardamom pods or cloves, and garnished with fried golden onions to serve.

== See also ==
- List of rice dishes
