= Nga thalaut paung =

Freshwater hilsa fish dish from Burma

Nga thalaut paung (Burmese: ငါးသလောက်ပေါင်း; pronounced [ŋəθəlaʊʔbáʊɴ]) is a freshwater hilsa fish dish from Burmese cuisine. The bony fish is cooked for hours with soy sauce, vinegar, tomatoes in lemongrass. The preparation melts the bones away.
