= Tofu Nway =

Traditional dish from the Shan State, Myanmar

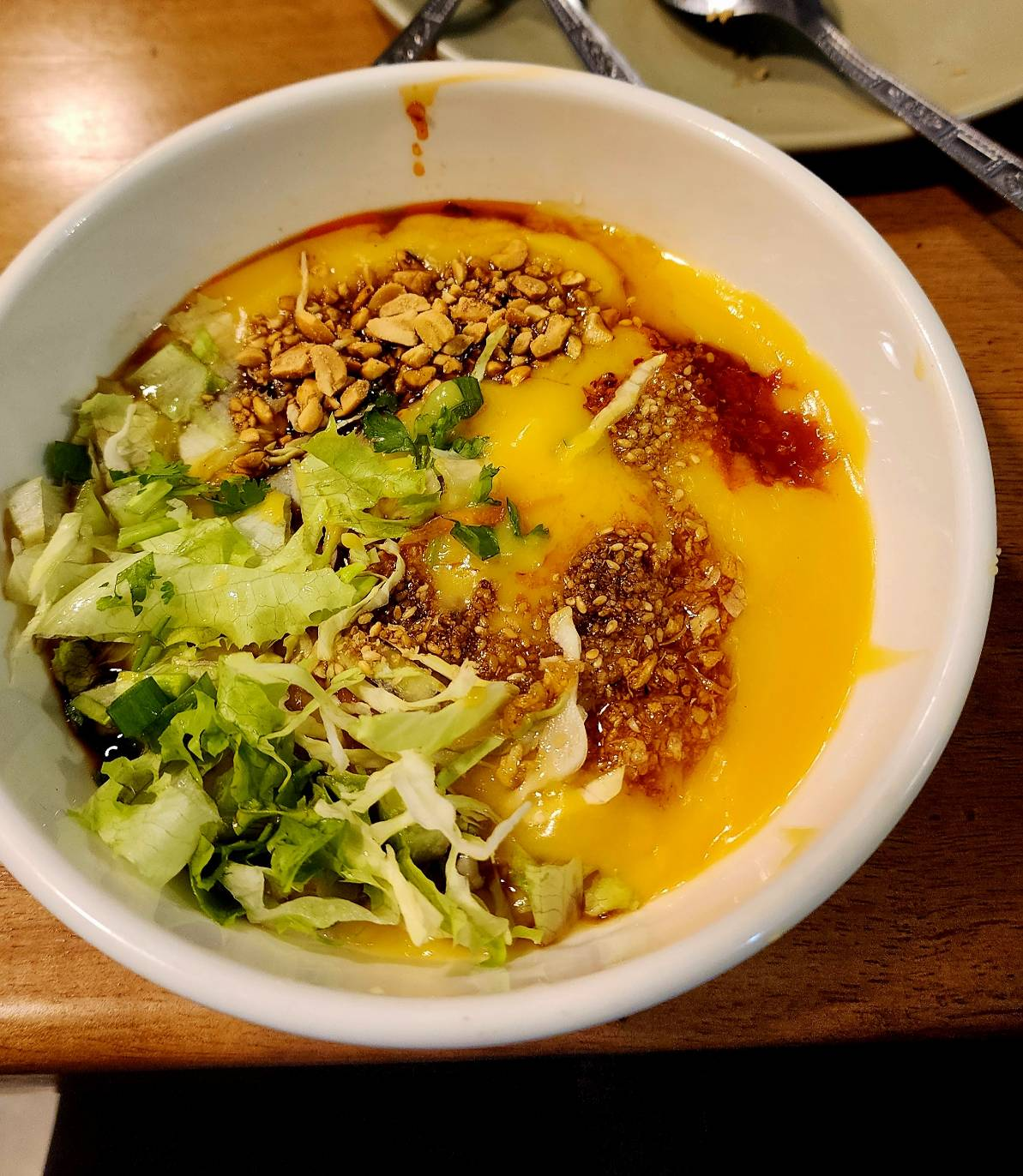
- Alternative names: To Hpu Nway, Warm Tofu
- Place of origin: Myanmar
- Region or state: Shan State
- Serving temperature: Hot/Warm
- Main ingredients: Chickpea flour, water, turmeric, salt

Tofu Nway (Burmese: တိုဖူးနွေး; Shan: တူဝ်းဖူယုင်; literally "warm tofu") is a traditional dish from the Shan State of Myanmar. Unlike standard tofu which is made from soy milk and coagulants, Tofu Nway is a creamy, custard-like porridge made from chickpea flour (besan) or yellow split peas. The dish is known for its smooth, silky texture and is usually served hot over rice noodles (shan khauk swe or rice noodle). It is commonly topped with chilli oil, pickled mustard greens, toasted sesame seeds, crushed peanuts and crispy fried garlic, which add layers of flavour and texture. Unlike the firmer version of Burmese tofu that is used in salads or fried as snacks, Tofu Nway is mostly enjoyed as a warm and comforting meal. It is especially popular for breakfast or as a satisfying comfort food or light food, particularly in the cooler highland areas of Shan State and Northern Thailand.

== Ingredients and preparation ==
The base of the dish is a smooth paste made from water, chickpea flour, and turmeric (which provides the signature yellow color). Unlike Burmese tofu, which is allowed to set until firm, Tofu Nway is cooked over low heat and stirred constantly to maintain a viscous, creamy consistency similar to polenta. The choice of protein can commonly be either chicken or pork. Common garnishes include: chili oil, pickled mustard greens, toasted sesame seeds, crushed peanuts and crispy fried garlic.

== Serving ==
Tofu Nway is traditionally served over (Shan noodles) rice noodles. It is rarely eaten plain; the flavor profile is built through a variety of toppings added just before serving. Common garnishes include:

- Oils: Chili oil and garlic oil.
- Crunch: Crushed roasted peanuts, deep-fried garlic, and crispy pork rinds.
- Savory Sauce: A tomato-based curry sauce (often containing chicken or pork).
- Herbs: Pickled mustard greens, coriander, and spring onions.

== Cultural significance ==
In Shan State, Tofu Nway is culturally established as a breakfast dish, commonly sold in morning markets and tea houses. It is considered a "comfort food" due to its warm temperature and soft texture. It is often consumed alongside other Shan specialties such as To hpu gyaw (deep-fried tofu fritters), which provide a textural contrast to the soft porridge. While Burmese cuisine often centers on fish-based broths, such as mohinga, Shan cuisine is distinct for its heavy use of legumes, fermented beans, and highland produce. Tofu Nway is considered a representative dish of this tradition. Beyond Myanmar, the dish has traveled with the Shan diaspora into Northern Thailand, particularly in Mae Hong Son and Chiang Mai.

== History ==
The origins of Tofu Nway are deeply rooted in the geography of the Shan State. Covering nearly a quarter of Myanmar's landmass (approx. 155,800 km²), the Shan State consists of a rugged plateau bisected by the Salween River. While Tofu Nway originated in the highlands, its status as a pan-Burmese icon is largely due to migration patterns into central Myanmar, particularly Mandalay.

The historical record indicates a steady flow of Shan people into central Burma, intensified during the Konbaung Dynasty (1752–1885) and the subsequent British colonial period. Following the fall of the Pagan dynasty in 1287, Shan chieftains founded the Ava and Sagaing kingdoms. This era of "Burmanized Shan" kings laid the groundwork for cultural exchange. Later, during the colonial era, economic opportunities in Mandalay drew Shan traders and artisans. The prevalence of Shan khauk swè (Burmese: ရှမ်းခေါက်ဆွဲ) and Tofu Nway in Mandalay tea shops today suggests a culinary integration where "Shan food" became synonymous with "comfort food" for the urban Bamar population.

== Related dishes ==
Tofu Nway is part of a wider family of Shan chickpea products. Other common variations using the same base ingredients include:

- Tofu Thoke (Tofu Salad): Unlike the warm porridge version, this dish uses chickpea tofu that has been allowed to set into a firm block. It is sliced and tossed with oil, tamarind sauce, and fresh vegetables.
- To Hpu Gyaw (Tofu Fritters): The firm tofu is cut into rectangular sticks and deep-fried until crispy. These are often served as a side dish or snack accompanying Tofu Nway.
- Pork rind : these are served in small pieces as a snack or side dish

== See also ==
- Rice noodles
- Burmese tofu
