= Ngapyaw baung =

Burmese dessert

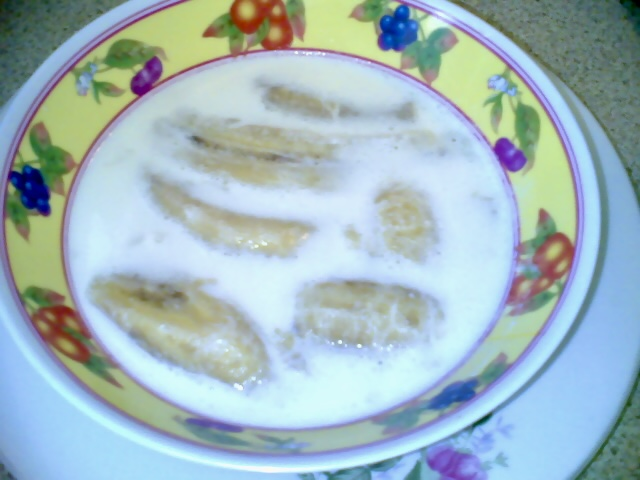
Ngapyaw baung

Ngapyaw baung (Burmese: ငှက်ပျောပေါင်း; pronounced [ŋəpjɔ́ páʊɴ]; also transliterated as Ngapyaw paung, lit. 'banana pudding') is a traditional Burmese dessert or mont. The dessert is a pudding cooked using fresh bananas stewed in milk, coconut milk and sugar, then sprinkled with sesame seeds or poppy seeds. It is served most often at ceremonies and other special occasions because it is an easy and quick dessert to make.
