= Paw hsan hmwe =

Variety of rice grown in Myanmar

Paw san hmwe
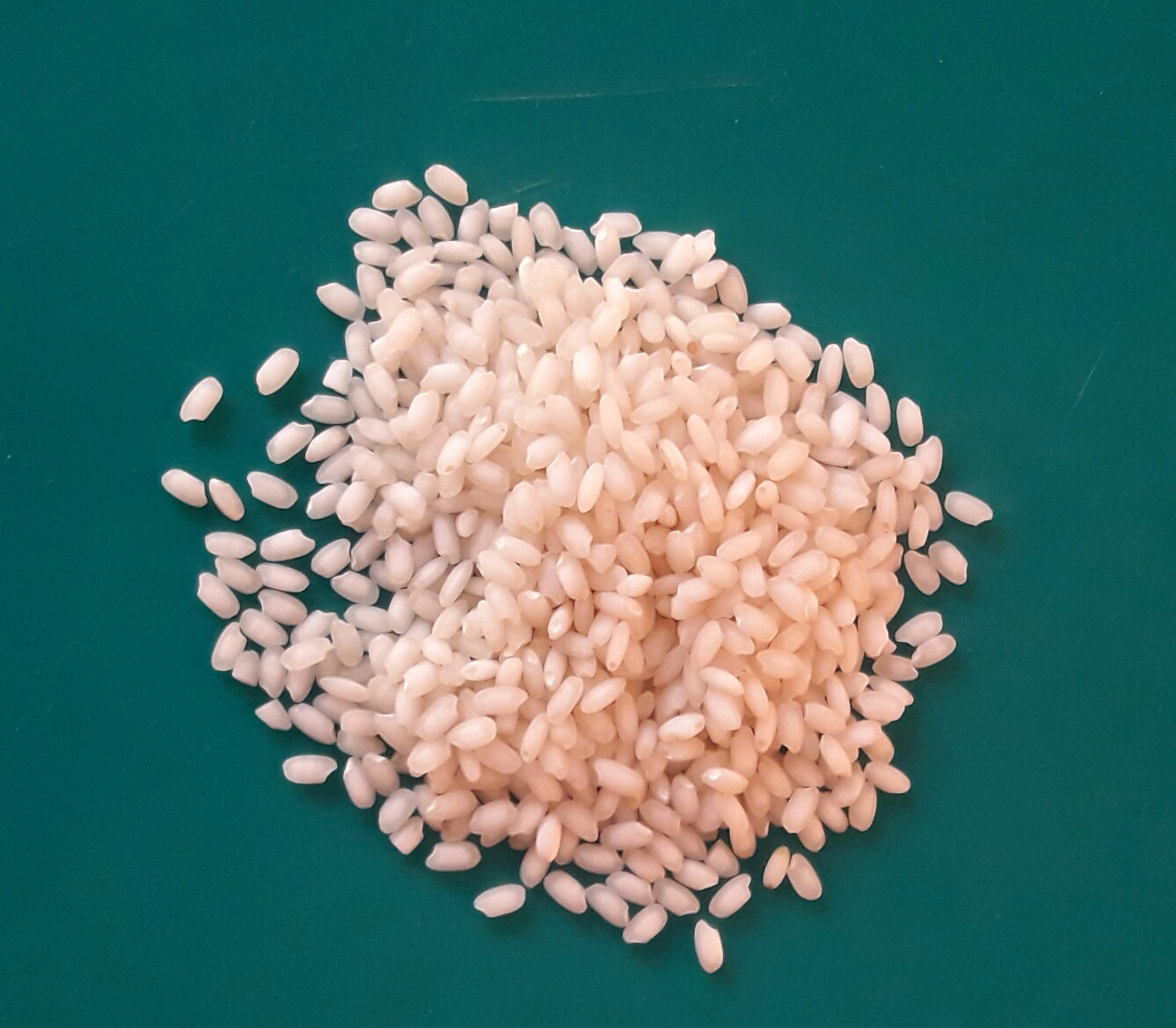
- Close-up of grains of uncooked paw san hmwe
- Species: Oryza sativa
- Origin: Burma (Myanmar)

Paw hsan hmwe (Burmese: ပေါ်ဆန်းမွှေး, pronounced [pɔ̀sʰáɴm̥wé]; also spelt paw san hmwe and known as Pearl Paw San or Myanmar pearl rice) is a high-grade variety of aromatic rice (fragrant rice) grown in Myanmar. Paw hsan hmwe is known for its good cooking quality, fragrant aroma, texture, good milling recovery, and substantial grain elongation during the cooking process. The medium-length grains of this rice variety can elongate up to three times in length while cooking. Paw hsan hmwe has intermediate amylose content, higher than jasmine rice, contributing to its hardness quality in line with Burmese consumer preferences.

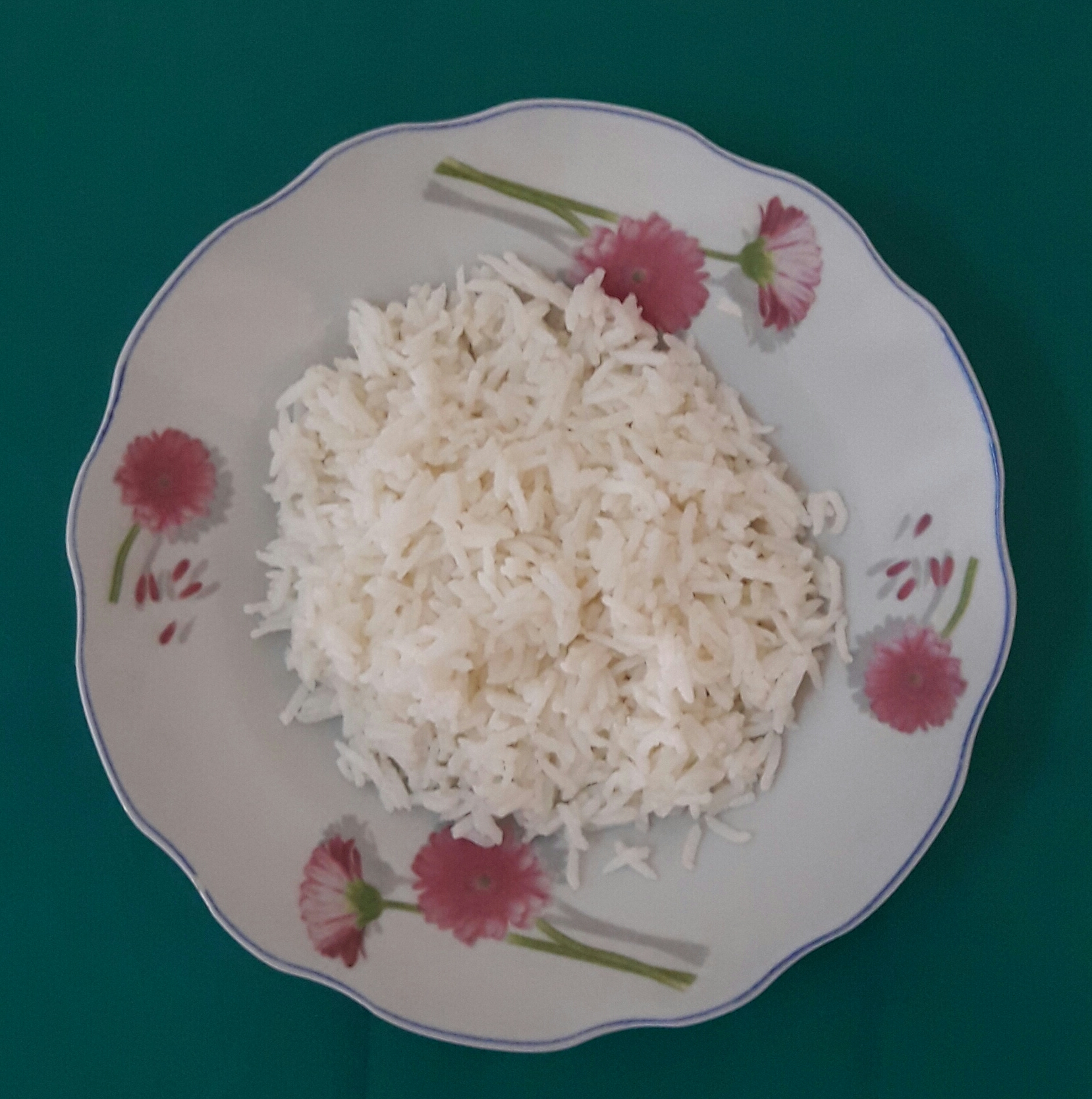
Cooked paw hsan hmwe

== Varieties ==
Paw hsan hmwe is a variety of Oryza sativa. Paw hsan hmwe is the market name for two varieties of paw hsan rice, namely paw hsan gyi (ပေါ်ဆန်းကြီး), also known as Shwebo paw hsan, and paw hsan yin (ပေါ်ဆန်းရင်). The former variety is photoperiod-sensitive and retains its aroma for up to two years with proper harvesting and storage, while the latter is non-photoperiod-sensitive and possesses a strong aroma that fades after five to six months. Paw hsan gyi was developed in 1944 using pure line selection of the paw hsan rice varieties.

== Production and cultivation ==
Paw hsan hmwe is largely cultivated in the Irrawaddy delta region of Myanmar. Since the mid-2000s, cultivation has expanded to Upper Myanmar.

== See also ==
- Basmati
- List of rice varieties
