= Burmese salads =

Category of dishes in Burmese cuisine

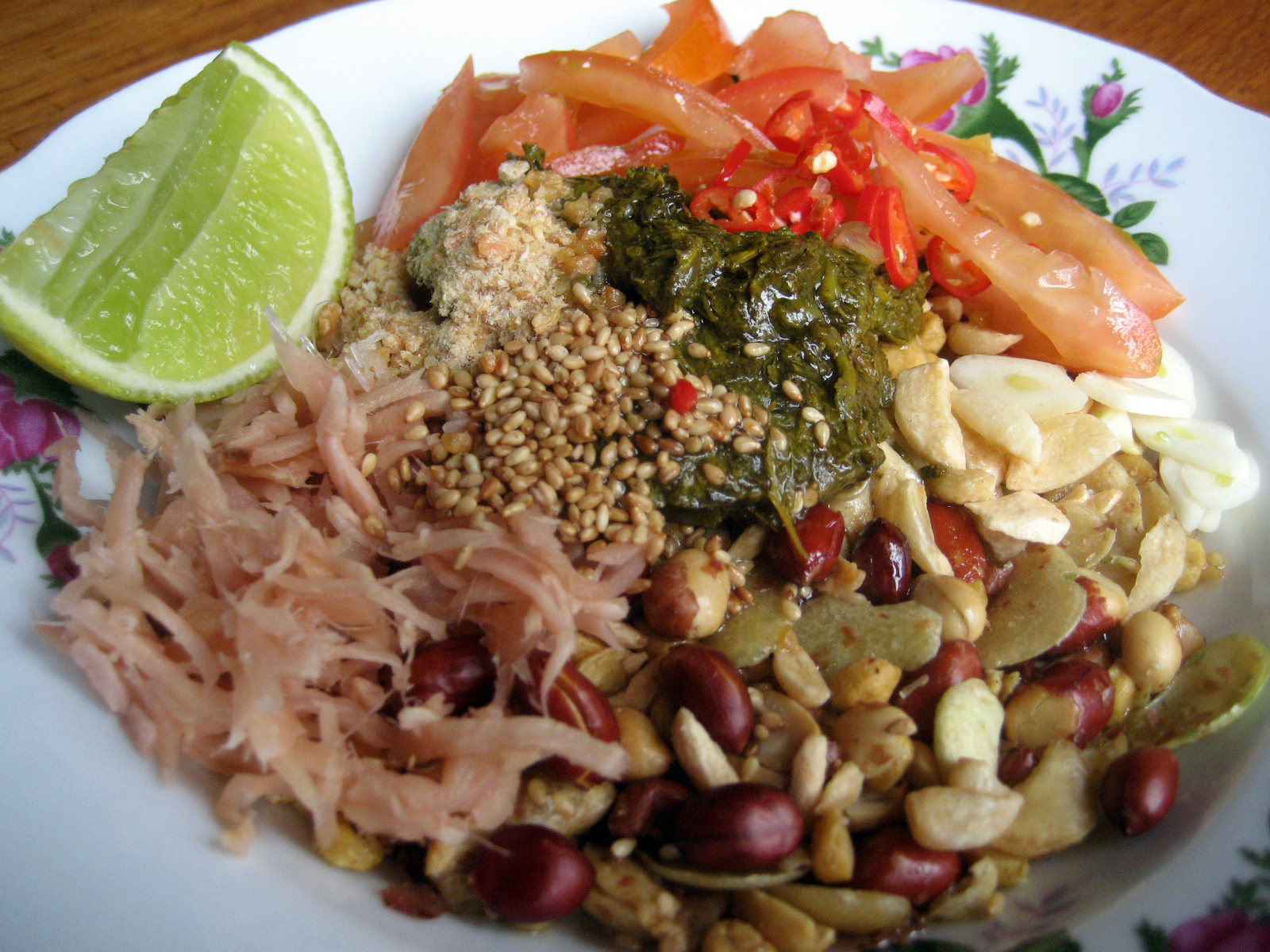
- A serving of laphet thoke (pickled tea leaf salad) before mixing.
- Course: Snack, Entree, Side dish
- Place of origin: Myanmar
- Associated cuisine: Burmese cuisine
- Serving temperature: Cold or room temperature
- Main ingredients: Various
- Similar dishes: Thai salads, Vietnamese salads

Burmese salads (Burmese: အသုပ်; transliterated athoke or athouk) are a diverse category of indigenous salads in Burmese cuisine. Burmese salads are made of cooked and raw ingredients that are mixed by hand to combine and balance a wide-ranging array of flavors and textures. Burmese salads are eaten as standalone snacks, as side dishes paired with Burmese curries, and as entrees. The most common or popular, the iconic laphet thoke (fermented tea leaf salad) is traditionally eaten as a palate cleanser at the end of a meal.

== Ingredients ==
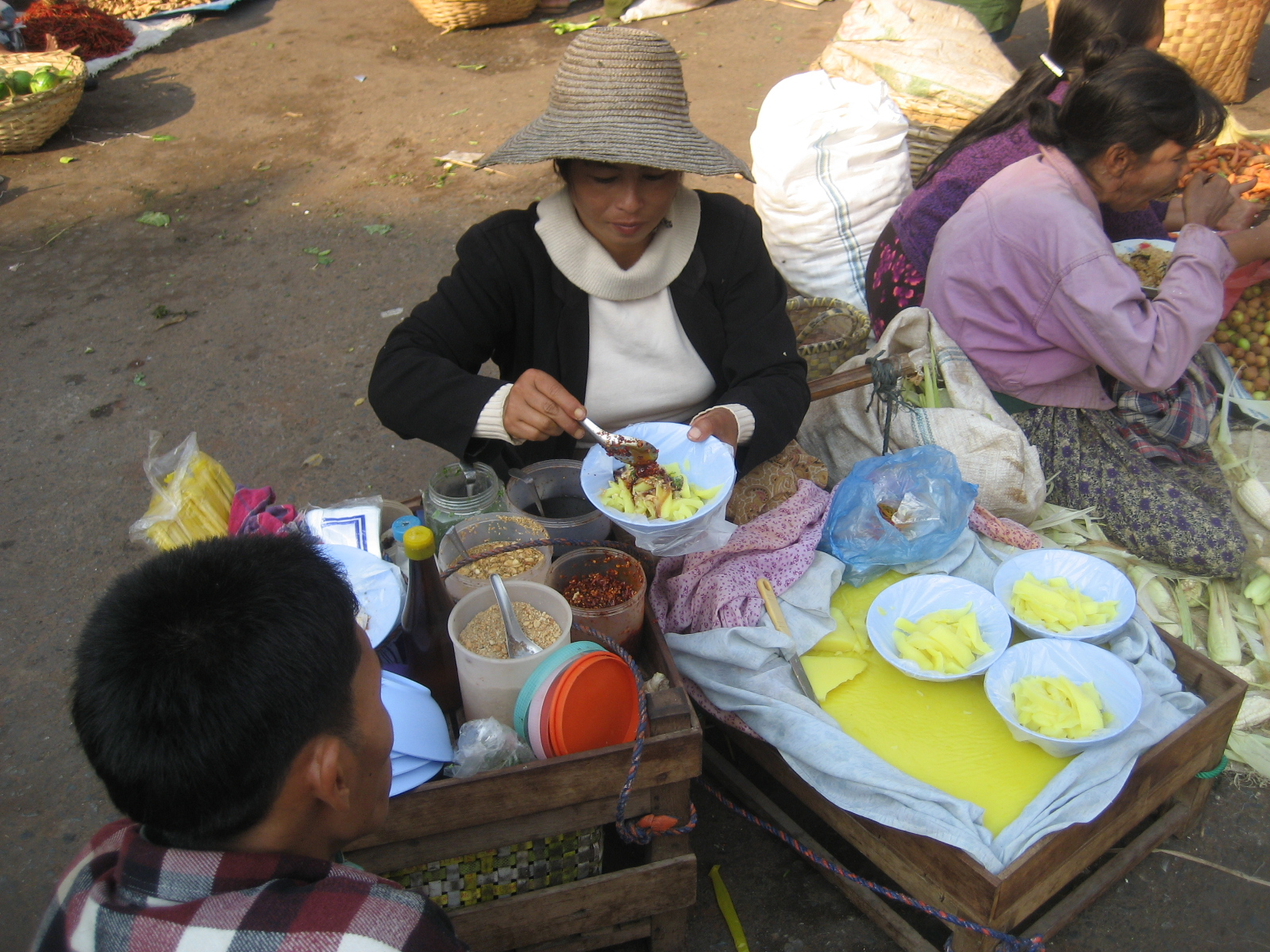
A street vendor preparing tophu thoke (tofu salad).

Burmese salads are typically centered on one major ingredient, ranging from rice, noodles and cooked ingredients (e.g., Burmese fritters), to raw fruits and vegetables. Common starches used in Burmese salads include rice, egg noodles, rice vermicelli, rice noodles, and potatoes. Burmese salads may also feature raw vegetables and fruits, such as tomatoes, cabbage, onions, kaffir lime, long beans, and mangoes. Fermented ingredients, including lahpet (pickled tea leaves), ngapi (fish paste), pon ye gyi (fermented bean paste), and pickled ginger, also feature prominently in several classic Burmese salads.

The salad ingredients are dressed with various seasonings, including chili oil, garlic oil, and sesame oil, toasted chickpea flour, lime juice, fish sauce, tamarind paste, peanuts, and fried garlic, and then thoroughly mixed by hand. Aromatic fresh herbs like coriander, mint, lime leaves, and green onions are also used to garnish Burmese salads.

== List of Burmese salads ==
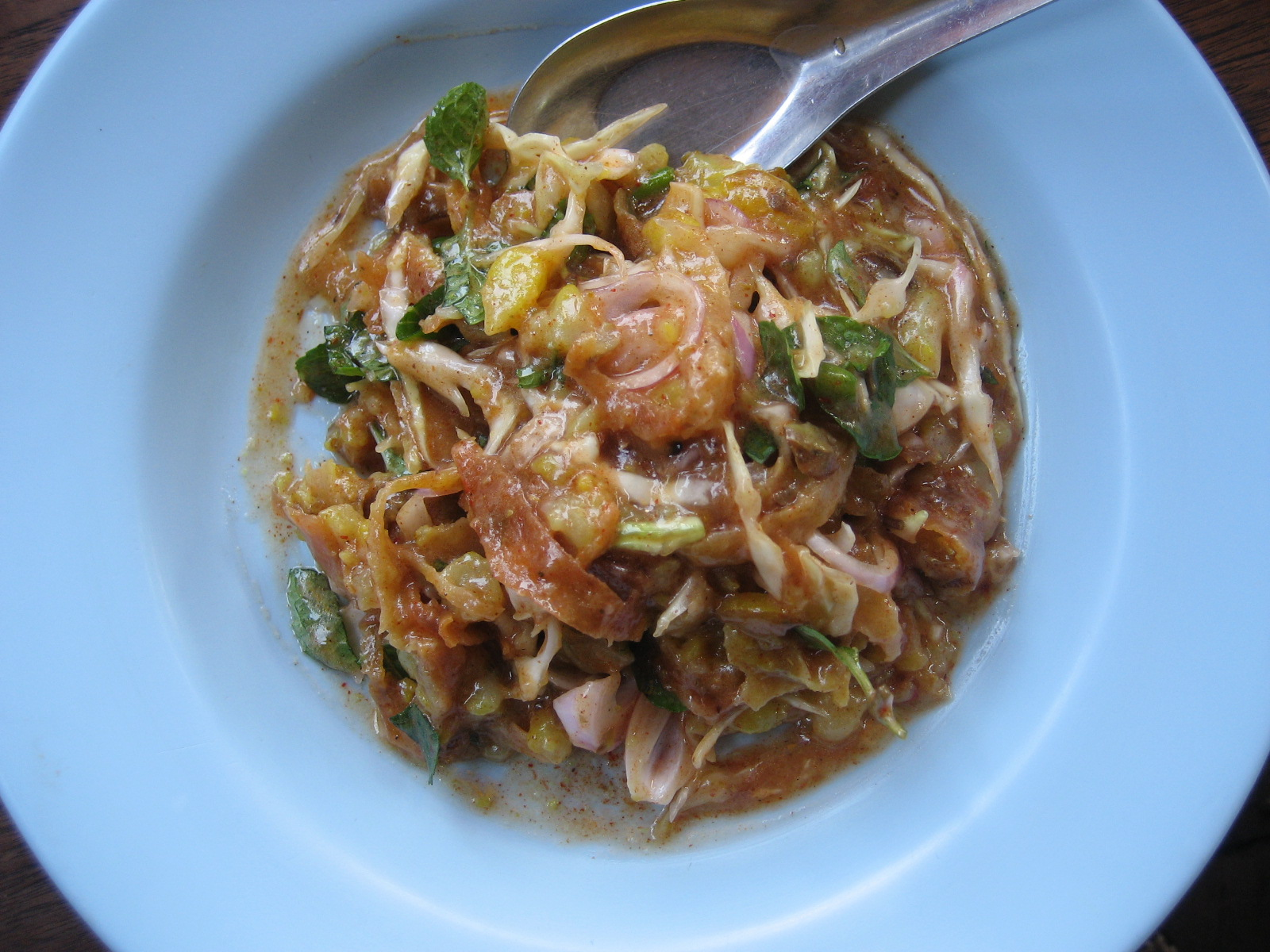
Samuza thoke, made with chopped pieces of samosa and a light curry broth

While the repertoire of Burmese salads has not been codified, Burmese salads are invariably suffixed with the word "-thoke" (သုပ်; lit. 'to mix by hand') in the Burmese language. Burmese salads are typically named after the salad's central ingredient (such as pomelo, ginger, or others). Common Burmese salads are listed below.

=== Fermented products ===
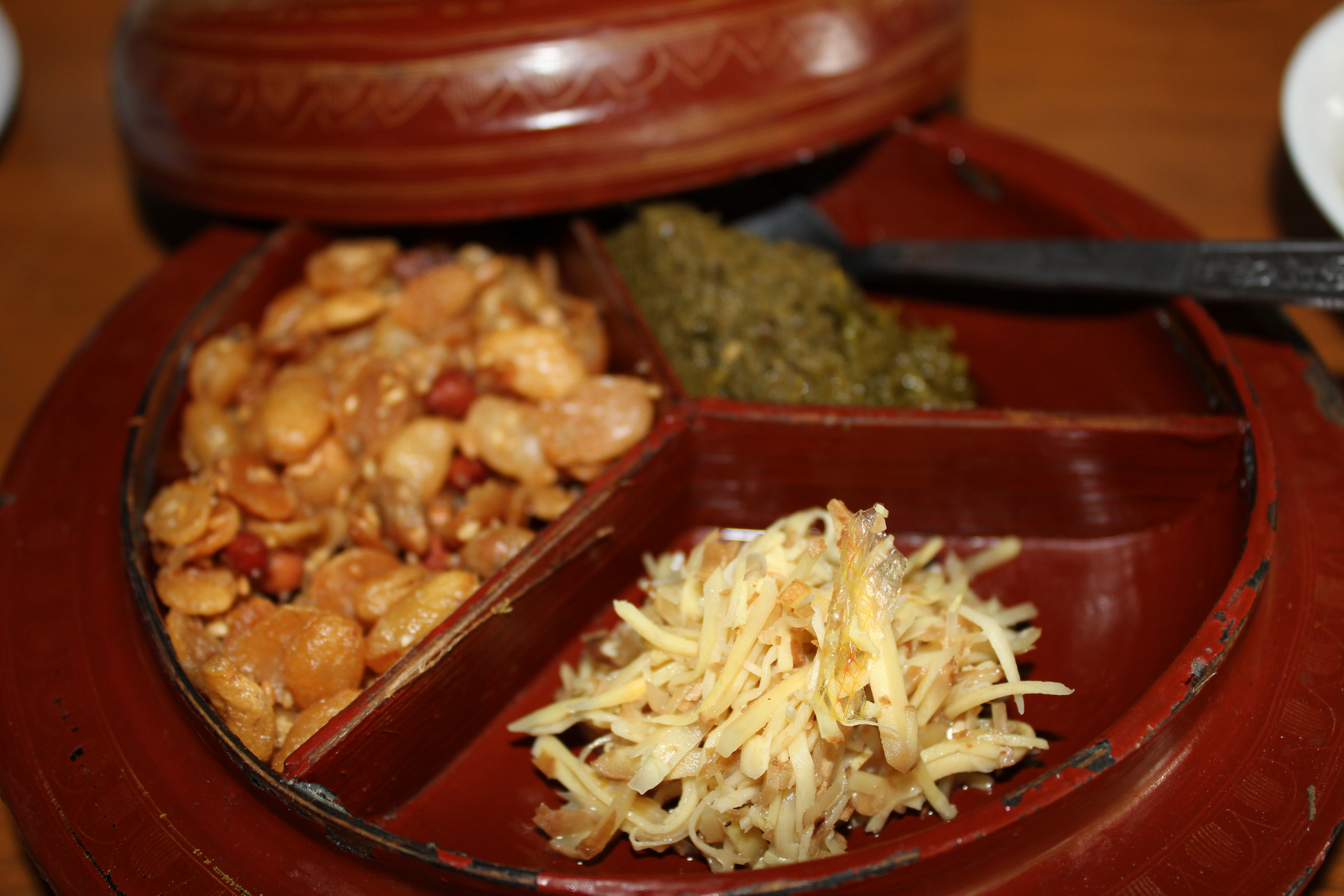
Pickled tea and ginger salad served in a traditional Burmese lacquer tray.

- Gyin thoke (ဂျင်းသုပ်; lit. 'ginger salad') – salad of shredded pickled ginger, with sesame seeds and assorted fried beans
- Laphet thoke (လက်ဖက်သုပ်; lit. 'tea leaf salad') – a salad of pickled tea leaves with fried chickpeas, peanuts and garlic, toasted sesame, fresh garlic, tomato, green chili, crushed dried shrimps, dressed with peanut oil, fish sauce and lime
- Ngachin thoke (ငါးချဉ်သုပ်) – a salad of ngachin (pressed sour fish), garlic, shallots, fresh chillies, and coriander
- Ngapi thoke (ငါးပိသုပ်) – salad of ngapi (fermented fish paste)
- Pon ye gyi thoke (ပုန်းရည်ကြီးသုပ်) – a salad from Upper Myanmar, featuring pon ye gyi (fermented bean paste), raw diced onions and shallots, and dried shrimp
- Hsei be u thoke (ဆေးဘဲဥသုပ်; lit. 'medicinal duck egg salad') – a salad made with century eggs, raw shallots, and julienned cabbage and carrots

=== Vegetables and herbs ===
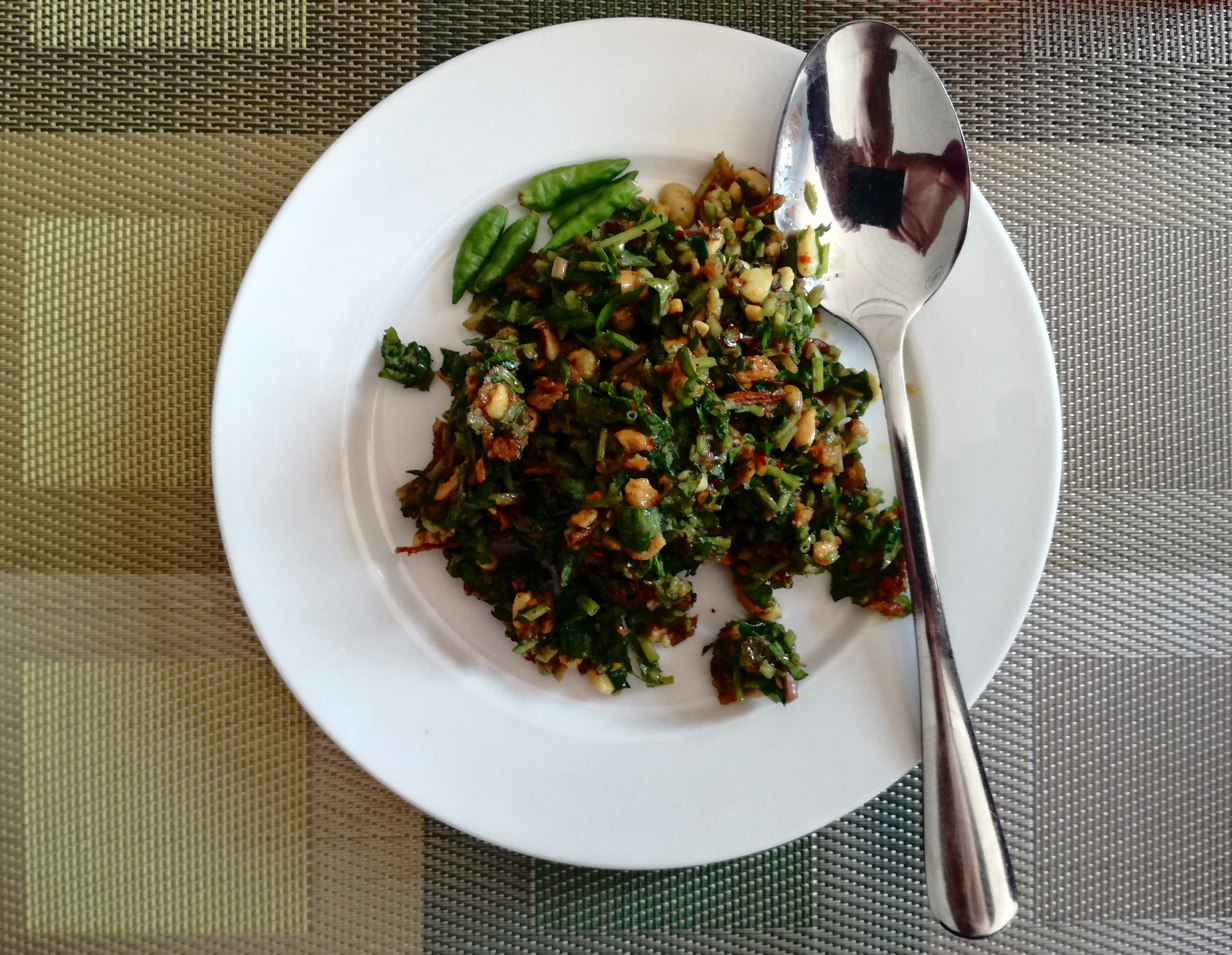
A plate of myinkhwaywet thoke featuring raw pennywort leaves

- Gazun ywet thoke (ကန်စွန်းရွက်သုပ်) – a salad made with blanched water spinach, lime juice, fried garlic and garlic oil, roasted rice powder and dried shrimp
- Khayanchin thi thoke (ခရမ်းချဉ်သီးသုပ်; lit. 'tomato salad') – a salad made with raw tomatoes, raw shallots, and dried shrimp powder
- Khayan thi miphok thoke (ခရမ်းသီးမီးဖုတ်သုပ်; lit. 'fire-baked eggplant salad') – a salad made with fire-roasted eggplant, shallots, and ngapi
- Kyaukpwint thoke (ကျောက်ပွင့်သုပ်; lit. 'rock blossom salad') – a sour Rakhine salad made with kyaukpwint, an edible seaweed
- Magyi ywet thoke (မန်ကျည်းရွက်သုပ်; lit. 'tamarind leaf salad') – an Upper Myanmar salad featuring tender blanched tamarind leaves, garlic, onions, roasted peanuts, and pounded dried shrimp
- Mezali phu thoke (မယ်ဇလီဖူးသုပ်; lit. 'cassia flower bud salad') – a salad of freshly picked Siamese cassia flower buds, boiled potatoes, sliced onions, peanuts, and sesame seeds, traditionally eaten during the full moon day of Tazaungmon
- Mon-la-u thoke (မုန်လာဥသုပ်; lit. 'radish salad') – a salad made with sliced radish, vinegar, and chilis
- Myinkhwa ywet thoke (မြင်းခွာရွက်သုပ်; lit. 'pennywort leaf salad') – an herbal salad featuring pennywort leaves dressed with lime juice and fish sauce
- Pethi thoke (ပဲသီးသုပ်; lit. 'green bean salad') – a salad of blanched and chopped green beans, and fried onions
- Tama ywet thoke (တမာရွက်သုပ်) – a salad made with bitter neem leaves

=== Fruits ===
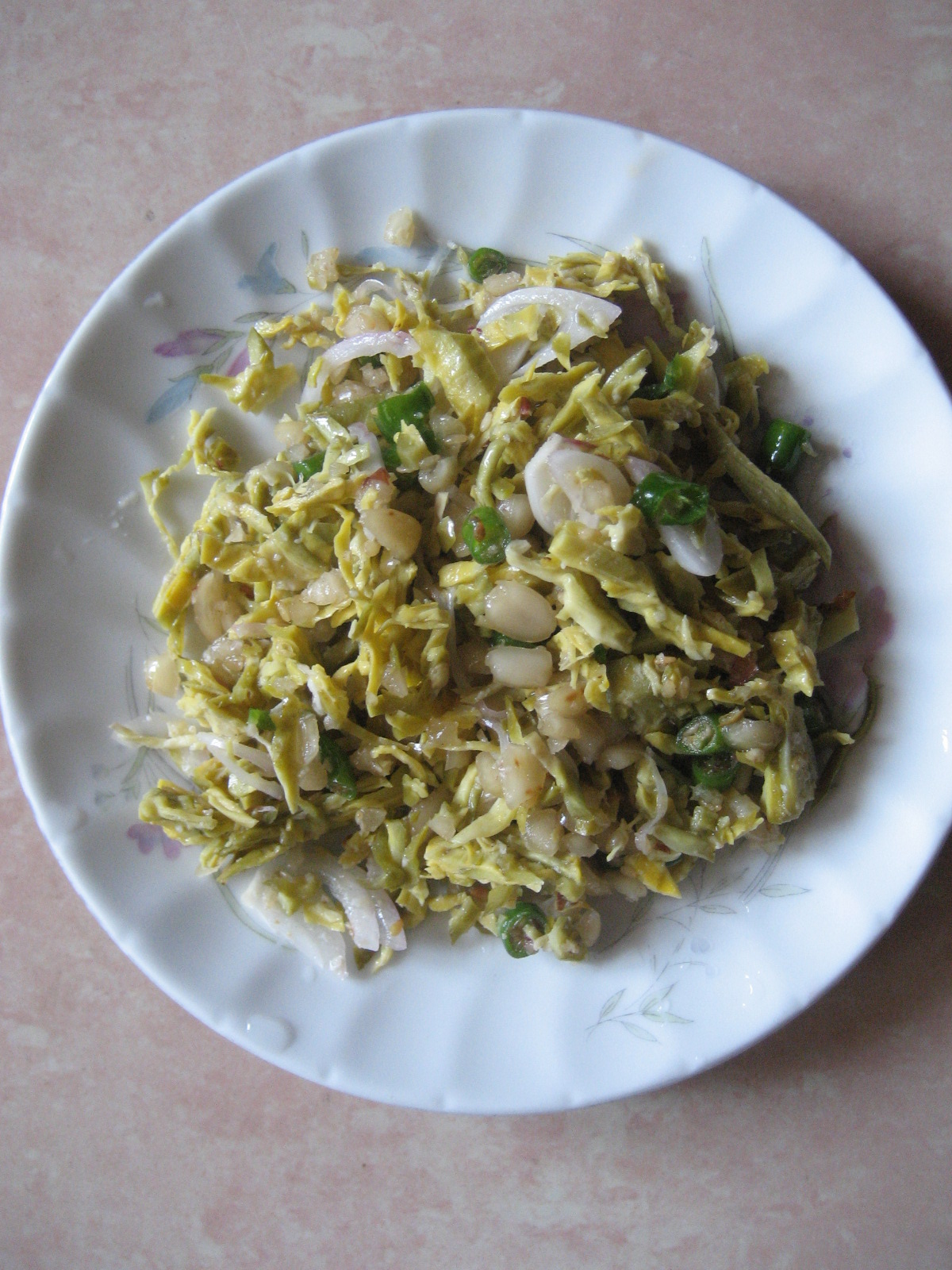
Thayet chin thoke, a fermented green mango salad with onions, chilli, roasted peanuts, sesame and peanut oil

- Shauk thi thoke (ရှောက်သီးသုပ်; lit. 'citron salad') – a salad of sliced lemon or kaffir lime (no pith or rind), toasted chickpea flour, crushed roasted peanut, crushed dried shrimp, crushed dried chili, baked fish paste, cooked oil with onions (often served with kya zan hinga)
- Kywegaw thi thoke (ကျွဲကောသီးသုပ်; lit. 'pomelo salad') – a salad of pomelo and shallots dressed in dried shrimp powder, chickpea flour, and fish sauce
- Mayan thi thoke (မရမ်းသီးသုပ်နည်း; lit. 'marian plum salad') – a salad made with sour marian plums and dried shrimp
- Ngapyawbu thoke (ငှက်ပျောဖူးသုပ်; lit. 'banana flower bud salad') – a salad of cooked banana flowers, peanuts, and sesame seeds
- Thayet thi thoke (သရက်သီးသုပ်; lit. 'mango salad') – a salad of julienned green mangoes, mixed with dried shrimp, onions, garlic, and chilis
- Thayet chin thoke (သရက်ချဉ်သုပ်; lit. 'sour mango salad') – Fermented green mango salad with onions, green chilli, roasted peanuts, sesame and peanut oil
- Thinbaw thi thoke (သင်္ဘောသီးသုပ်; lit. 'papaya salad') – a salad of shredded green papaya, mixed with ground dried shrimp, onions, and fried garlic; tossed in garlic oil, lemon juice, and a little hot chili pepper

=== Seafood and meat ===
- Bazun thoke (ပုဇွန်သုပ်; lit. 'prawn salad') – pickled prawn salad
- Kinmun thoke (ကင်းမွန်သုပ်; lit. 'cuttlefish salad') – a sour and spicy salad made with cooked cuttlefish
- Kyettha thoke (ကြက်သားသုပ်; lit. 'chicken salad') – a salad of shredded chicken, tomatoes, and shallots dressed in chickpea flour, fish sauce, turmeric, and lime
- Kyetchidauk thoke (ကြက်ခြေထောက်သုပ်; lit. 'chicken feet salad') – a sour and spicy salad made with chicken feet
- Ngaphe thoke (ငါးဖယ်သုပ်; lit. 'fishcake salad') – a salad of bronze featherback fishcakes, diced raw shallots, and raw tomatoes
- Nga baung thoke (ငါးပေါင်းသုပ်; lit. 'steamed fish salad') – mixed vegetables and prawn, wrapped in morinda leaves and banana leaves outside
- Pyigyi nga thoke (ပြည်ကြီးငါးသုပ်; lit. 'squid salad') – a salad made with cooked squid

=== Rice and noodles ===
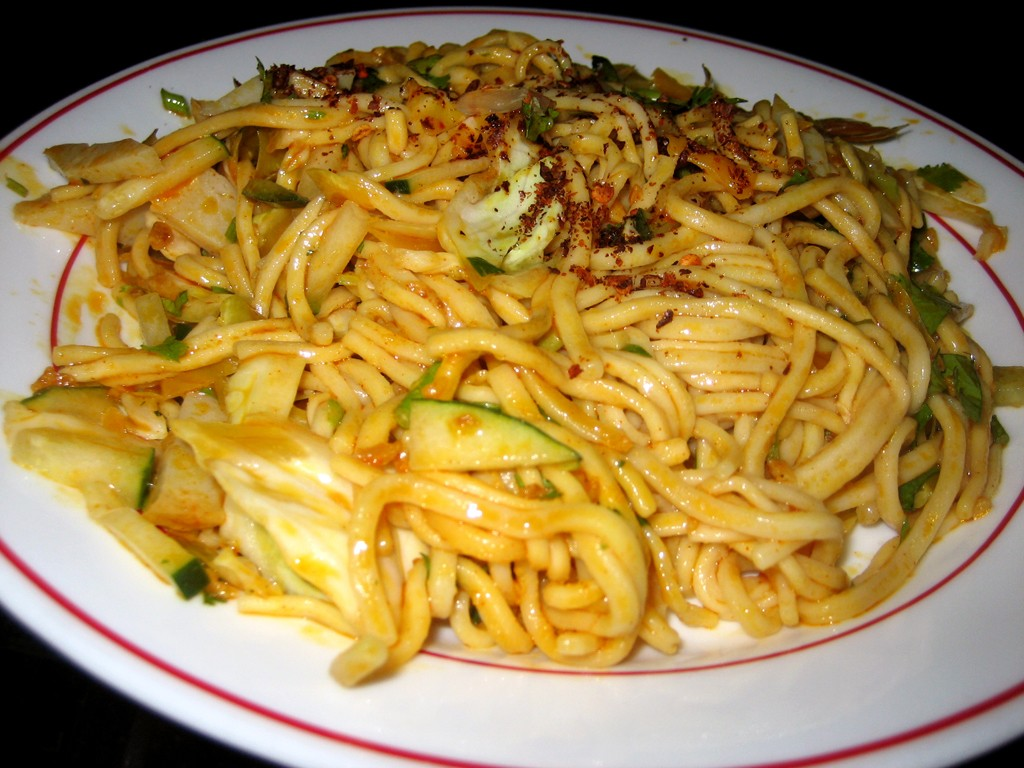
A plate of khauk swe thoke (noodle salad)

- Htamin thoke (ထမင်းသုပ်; lit. 'rice salad'‌) – Rice salad with tomato puree, potato, glass noodle, toasted chickpea flour, crushed toasted dried fermented beancake, crushed dried shrimp, crushed dried chilli, garlic and dressed with cooked peanut oil, fish sauce, lime or tamarind and coriander
  - Nattalin rice salad – A regional variation of rice salad from Bago Region's Nattalin, served with rice, sliced Burmese tofu, sliced onions, carrots, coriander, cabbage, roasted chickpea flour, fried crackers, roasted chili powder, eaten with garlic, fermented bean sprouts and fermented mango
  - Padaung rice salad – A regional variation of rice salad from Bago Region's Padaung, consisting of rice, fried tofu, and fried crackers
  - Pyay rice salad - A regional variation of rice salad from Bago Region's Pyay, served with rice, cellophane noodles, cabbage, potato, mushrooms and bean sprouts, pulverised dried shrimp, chickpea flour and roasted chili powder, fried tofu puffs, and dressed with garlic oil, tamarind juice, fish sauce
  - Thegon rice salad – A regional variation of rice salad from Bago Region's Thegon, served with potato, julienned green papaya, noodles, cellophane noodles, rice, chickpea flour, fried crackers, and fermented bean sprouts dressed in tamarind juice, garlic oil and chili oil, and traditionally served on Dipterocarpus tuberculatus leaves
- Khauk swè thoke (ခေါက်ဆွဲသုပ်; lit. 'noodle salad'‌) – Wheat noodle salad with dried shrimps, shredded cabbage and carrots, dressed with fried peanut oil, fish sauce and lime
- Kya zan thoke (ကြာဆံသုပ်; lit. 'glass noodle salad') – Glass vermicelli salad with boiled prawn julienne and mashed curried duck eggs and potatoes
- Let thoke sone (လက်သုပ်စုံ; lit. 'assorted hand-mixed salad') – similar to htamin thoke with shredded green papaya, shredded carrot, ogonori sea moss, wheat noodles, and glass noodles
- Mont di thoke (မုန့်တီသုပ်) – a variety of regional salads featuring rice vermicelli called mont di
- Nan gyi thoke (နန်းကြီးသုပ်‌; lit. 'thick rice noodle salad') – Thick rice noodle salad with chickpea flour, chicken, fish cake (nga hpe), onions, coriander, spring onions, crushed dried chilli, dressed with fried crispy onion oil, fish sauce and lime
- Nanbyagyi thoke (နန်းပြား‌ကြီးသုပ်; lit. 'flat rice noodle salad') – As above with tagliatelle.

=== Other ===
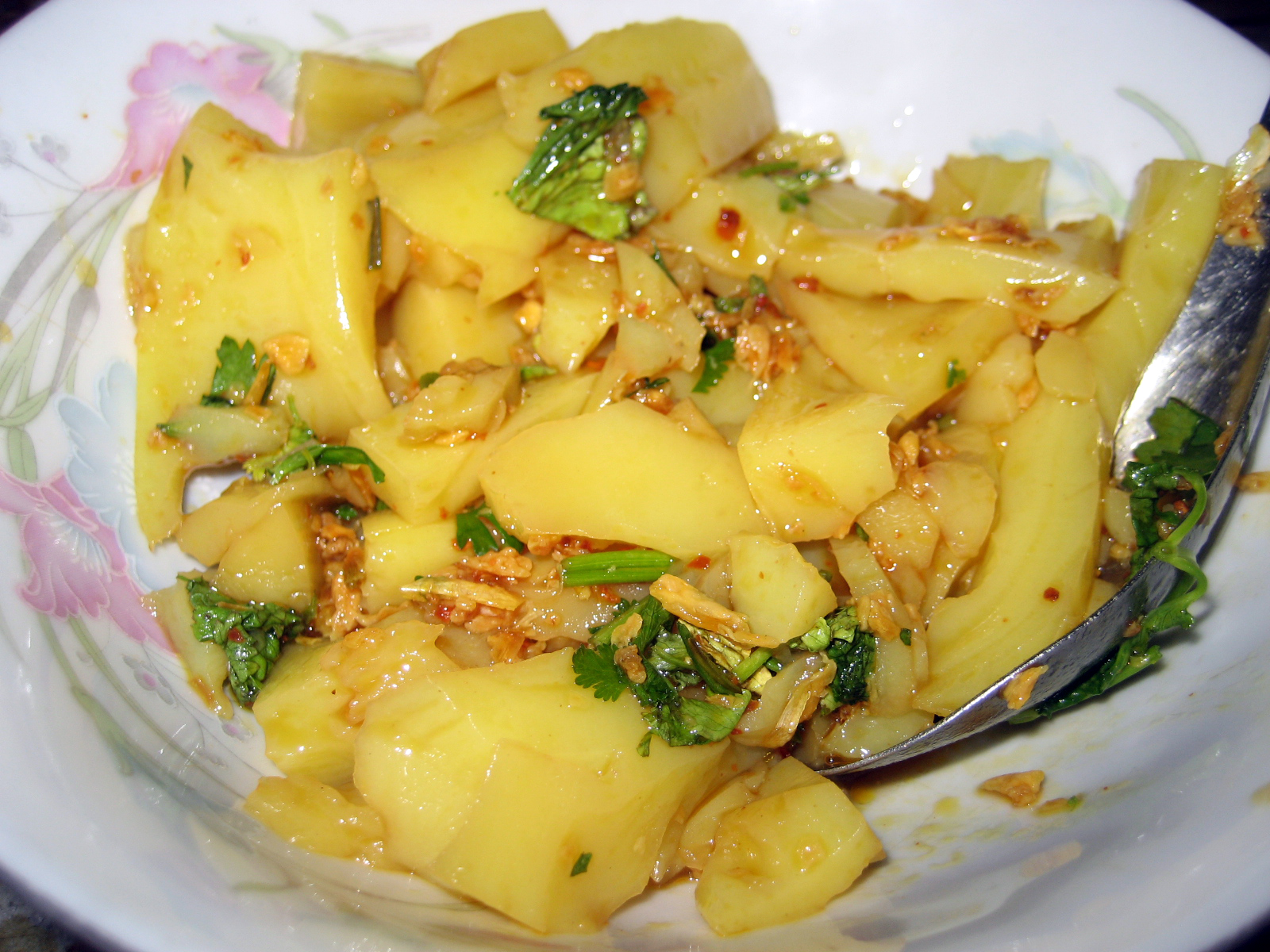
Shan tofu salad as served in Yangon, Myanmar

- Pyay palata (ပြည်ပလာတာ) or Palata thoke (ပလာတာသုပ်) – a salad of hand-torn paratha in a spiced potato curry broth, served with fresh mint, julienned cabbage, and onions, from the town of Pyay
- Samuza thoke (စမူဆာသုပ်‌; lit. 'samosa salad') – a salad of cut samosa pieces with onions, cabbage, fresh mint, light potato curry broth, masala, chili powder, salt and lime
- Tophu thoke (တို့ဟူးသုပ်; lit. 'tofu salad') – a salad of Fresh Burmese tofu slices, dressed and garnished with peanut oil, dark soy sauce, garlic, and lime leaves

== Regional adaptations ==
=== Mee kola ===
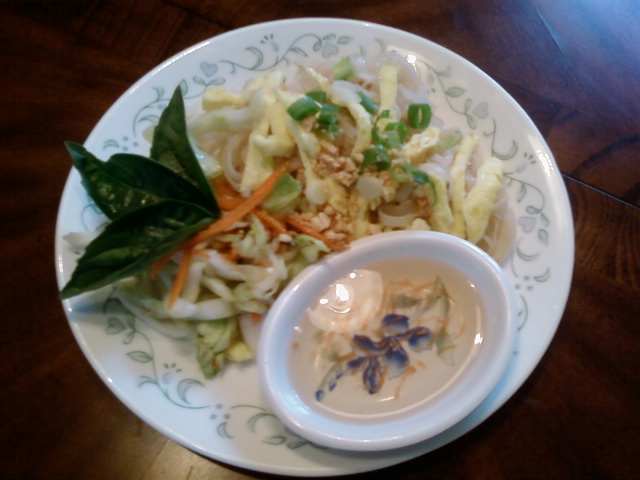
Mee kola

Mee kola (Khmer: មីកូឡា or មីកុឡា), also known as Burmese-style noodles, is a Cambodian noodle dish that originated among the Kola people in the Pailin Province, who originally descended from Burmese migrants to Cambodia's northwest. The noodle salad consists of steamed rice vermicelli, cooked with soy sauce and garlic chives, and served with pickled vegetables (e.g., papaya, carrot, and cucumber), hard-boiled eggs, sweet garlic fish sauce, dried shrimp, and crushed peanuts, and garnished with lime and chili flakes. The dish has become a popular street food in Cambodia.

=== India ===
Following the 1962 Burmese coup d'état, over 300,000 Burmese Indians returned to their ancestral homes in India. Many refugees settled in the port city of Madras (now Chennai), where a community around Burma Bazaar in George Town formed. Burmese Indian refugees there became street hawkers, selling a dish locally called atho (அத்தோ), which is an adaptation of khauk swe thoke, the Burmese noodle salad. Atho is a mixture of noodles, shredded cabbage and onions garnished with tamarind, salt, fried onions, chili flakes, garlic and ajinomoto seasoning.
