= Barak Kol =

Barak Kol may refer to:

- Barak Kol (lake)
- Barak Kol (physicist)

== See also ==
- Barakol, a chemical compound
