= Atho =

Atho may refer to

- Atho, an egg noodle dish
- A name for the Horned God, one of the two primary deities found in some neopagan, especially Wiccan, religions
