= Burmese curry =

Dishes in Burmese cuisine made with curry base

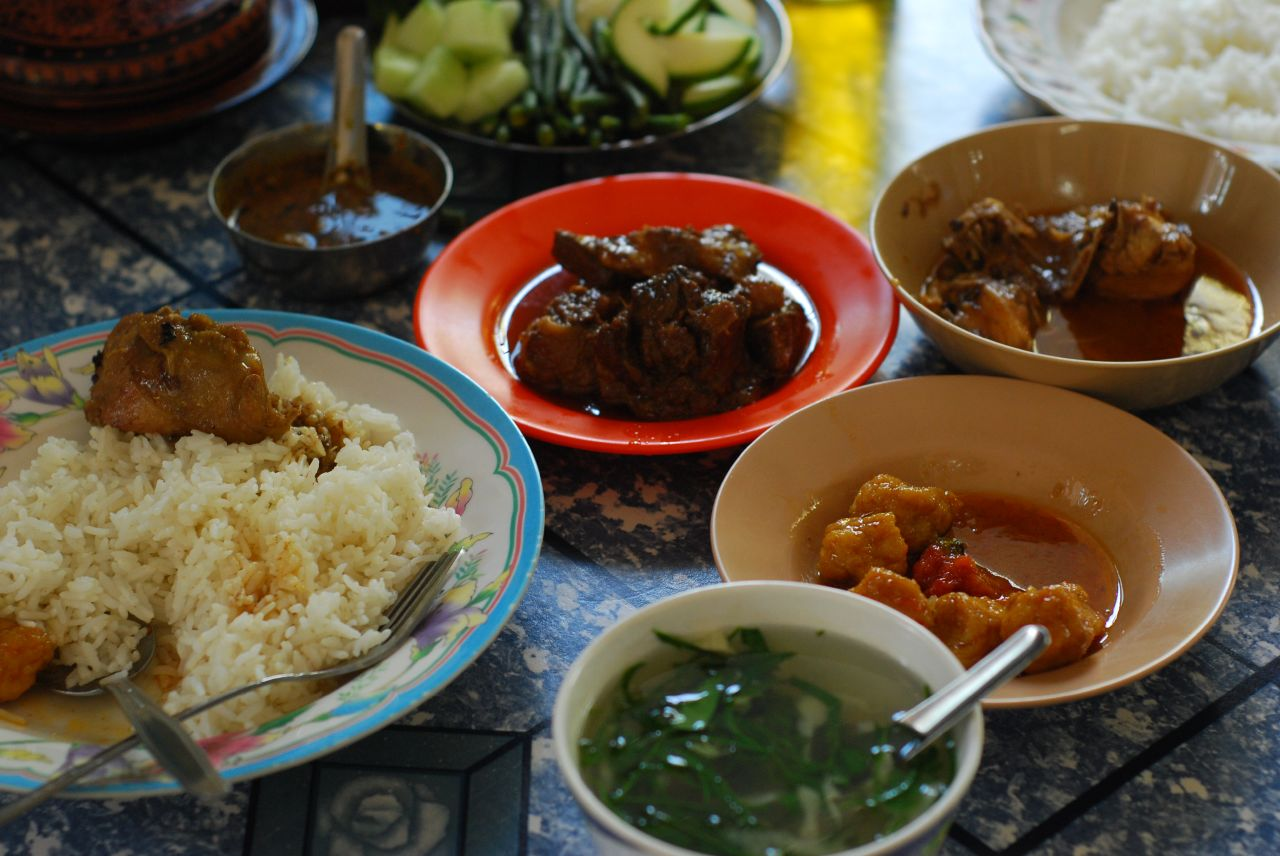
- A traditional meal featuring several Burmese curries.
- Type: Curry
- Course: Entree
- Place of origin: Myanmar (Burma)
- Associated cuisine: Burmese cuisine
- Serving temperature: Hot or room temperature
- Main ingredients: Curry base (onions, garlic, chilis, ginger, and turmeric), meat, seafood, vegetables
- Variations: Many; see list below

Burmese curry refers to a diverse array of dishes in Burmese cuisine that consist of meat or vegetables simmered or stewed in an aromatic curry base. Burmese curries generally differ from other Southeast Asian curries (e.g., Thai curry) in that Burmese curries make use of dried spices in addition to fresh herbs and aromatics, and are often milder. Burmese curries are readily available in curry houses throughout the country. They are traditionally accompanied with rice and a variety of side dishes, soups, and Burmese salads called athoke. Burmese curries may also be paired with Indian breads like nanbya, palata, aloo puri, and toshay.

== Ingredients ==
A curry base of fresh aromatics including onions, shallots, garlic, chilis, ginger, and dried spices, in the form of turmeric powder and paprika, is typically used to prepare most Burmese curries. Other dried spices such as chili powder and spice mixes like garam masala, generically called masala in Burmese (မဆလာ), also feature in many Burmese curries. The Burmese masala spice blend typically consists of ground cinnamon or cassia, cardamon, cloves, and black pepper.

The curry base and dried spices are then fried in heated oil, in a process called hsi that (ဆီသတ်, lit. 'to kill the oil'). Some Burmese curries also require the use of fresh herbs, such as lemongrass, curry leaf, pyindawthein, and fresh tamarind paste. Shan and Kachin curries make more liberal use of fresh herbs such as galangal and sawtooth coriander, while Mon curries often use marian plum as a souring agent. Burmese curries are generally seasoned with fish sauce, salt, and/or ngapi (fermented shrimp or fish paste), and are traditionally cooked in a blend of peanut oil and sesame oil.

== Terminology ==
The Burmese language does not have a single word for "curry;" the closest approximation is the word hin (ဟင်း), which is used to describe most protein-based dishes eaten with rice. Burmese curries can be generally categorized by cooking technique, incorporated ingredients, or region.

The most common variety is called hsibyan (ဆီပြန်; lit. 'oil returns'), which is typified by a layer of oil that separates from the gravy and meat after cooked. The name itself refers to the cooking technique that is used. In hsibyan, the curry ingredients are simmered in a combination of water and oil until the water has completely boiled off, leaving a layer of oil that separates and rises to the top, which enables the raw and potent curry paste ingredients to properly blend and become milder in taste. Another common variety of curries is called hnat (နှပ်; lit. 'tenderized'), in which gamier proteins like goat are braised or slowly simmered. The names of other Burmese curries are typically suffixed with –hin (–ဟင်း) or –chet (–ချက်).

== List of Burmese curries ==
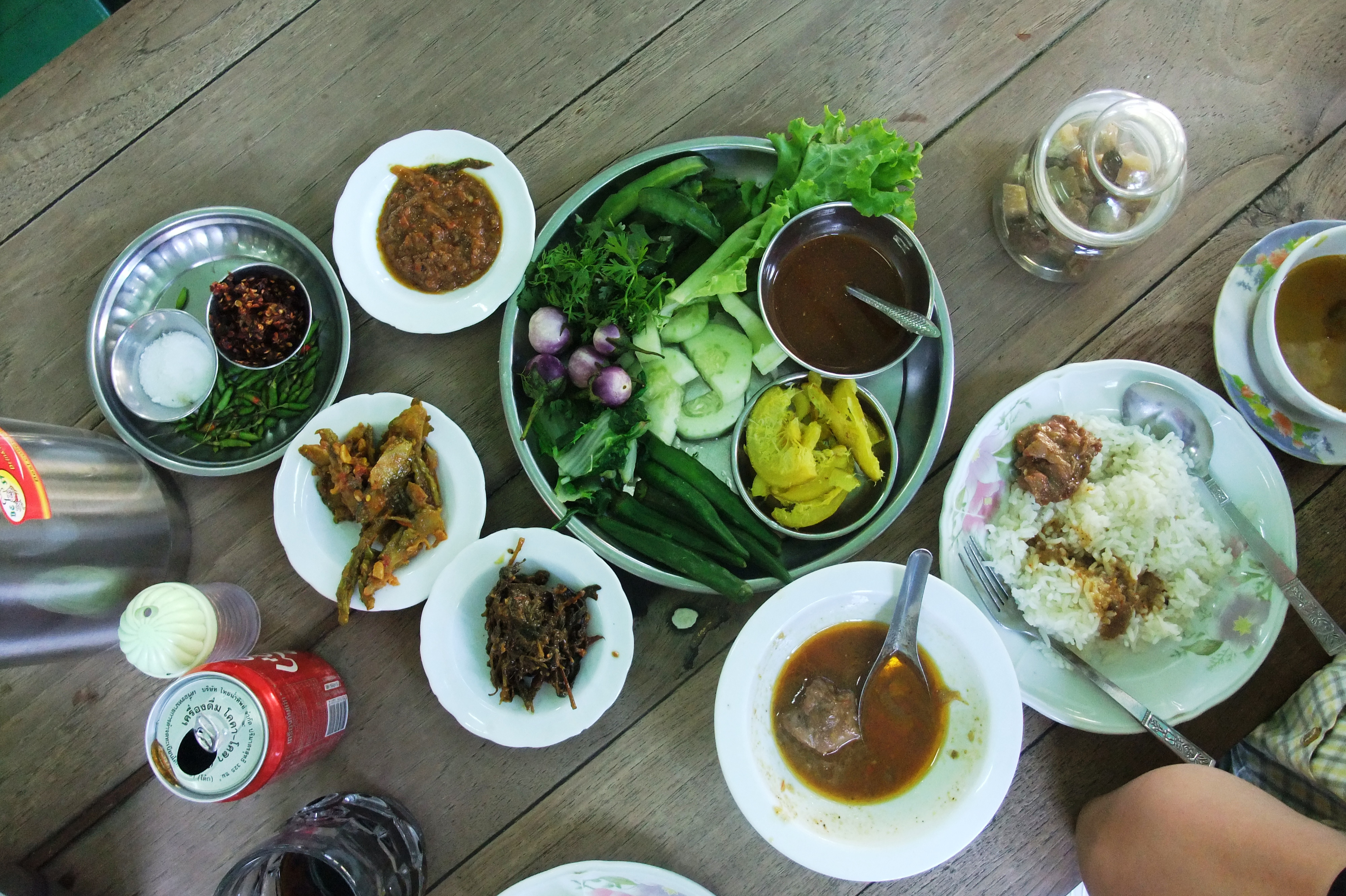
A traditional Burmese meal includes several curry dishes, side dishes, and a tray of parboiled vegetables with a fermented fish paste (ngapi yay) dip.

The repertoire of Burmese curries has not been codified. Common variations of Burmese curries are listed below.

=== Pork ===
- Pork sibyan (ဝက်သားဆီပြန်) – classic Burmese curry with fatty cuts of pork
- Pork hnat (ဝက်သားနှပ်) – a sweetened pork curry braised with vinegar and soy sauce
- Pork and pickled mango curry (ဝက်သားသရက်သီးသနပ်ချက်) – a sour and sweet pork curry cooked with pickled mangoes
- Pork tripe sibyan (ဝက်ကလီစာဆီပြန်) – a curry of pork intestines and viscera (kaliza)
- Red braised pork curry (ဝက်သားနီချက်) – a sweet braised curry of caramelized pork belly and soy sauce similar to Chinese red braised pork belly
- Fermented bean paste pork curry (ဝက်ပုန်းရည်ကြီး) – a curry of pork cooked with pon ye gyi (fermented bean paste)
- Pork and bamboo shoot curry (ဝက်သားမျှစ်ချဉ်) – a sour curry of pork and pickled bamboo shoots
- Pork meatball sibyan (ဝက်သားလုံးဆီပြန်) – a curry of fried pork meatballs cooked in gravy
- Fermented tea leaf pork hnat (ဝက်သားလက်ဖက်နှပ်) – a sour and spicy curry of pork braised with lahpet (pickled tea leaves)

=== Poultry ===
- Chicken sibyan (ကြက်သားဆီပြန်) – the classic Burmese curry, served with a thick gravy of aromatics
- Bachelor's chicken curry (ကြက်ကာလသားချက်) – a red and watery chicken curry cooked with calabash
- Kachin-style chicken curry (ကြက်ကချင်ချက်) – an herbal curry of chicken cooked with basil, sawtooth coriander, Vietnamese coriander, and dried metlin bark
- Mon-style chicken curry (ကြက်မွန်ချက်) – a watery chicken curry, cooked with dried marian plum, lemongrass stalks and sawtooth coriander
- Chicken and potato curry (ကြက်သားဟင်း) – an Indian-inspired curry of chicken and potatoes cooked with a masala spice mix
- Chicken and chickpea curry (ကြက်သားကုလားပဲချက်)
- Duck sibyan (ဘဲသားဆီပြန်) – a curry of duck cooked with dried spices (e.g., star anise or cumin), and served with a thick gravy of aromatics

=== Goat and beef ===
- Beef hnat (အမဲနှပ်) – a braised beef curry similar to Indonesian rendang
- Goat hnat (ဆိတ်သားနှပ်) – a braised goat curry spiced with masala, cinnamon sticks, bay leaf, and cloves
- Goat and chickpea curry (ဆိတ်သားကုလားပဲချက်)

=== Fish and seafood ===
- Fried fish curry (ငါးကြော်ချက် or ငါးကြော်နှပ်) – a curry of deep-fried steak cuts of fish and tomatoes
- Steamed hilsa curry (ငါးသလောက်ပေါင်း) – a curry of hilsa fish and tomatoes, which is slowly simmered to melt the fish bones
- Sardine curry (ငါးသေတ္တာချက်) – a curry of sardines cooked with tomatoes
- Prawn sibyan (ပုစွန်ဆီပြန်) – a curry of whole prawns cooked in a sibyan gravy and shrimp oil (ပုစွန်ဆီ), similar to tomalley
- Snakefish intestine sibyan (ငါးရံ့အူဆီပြန်) – a curry of striped snakefish intestines
- Eel sibyan (ငါးရှဉ့်ဆီပြန်)
- Catfish and morinda sibyan (ငါးခူရဲယိုရွက်ဆီပြန်) – a curry of walking catfish and morinda leaves

=== Other ===
- Egg curry (ဘဲဥချဥ်ရည်ဟင်း) – a sour curry made with hardboiled duck or chicken eggs, cooked in tamarind paste and mashed tomatoes
- Eggplant curry (ခရမ်းသီးချက်) – a curry of slow-cooked eggplants and tomatoes
- Lablab bean hnat (ပဲကြီးနှပ်) – a curry of braised lablab beans
- Roselle curry (ချဉ်ပေါင်ချက်) – a sour curry of roselle leaves, bamboo shoots, and dried shrimp
- Khayan thi ngachauk chet (ခရမ်းသီးငါးခြောက်ချက်) – aubergine cooked lightly with a small amount of oil, with dried fish and chilli
- Kima palata (ကီးမားပလာတာ) – a paratha stuffed with curried ground meat (keema)
- Pyay palata (ပြည်ပလာတာ) – a salad of paratha, chicken and potato curry, and raw onions
- Tofu curry (တိုဟူးချက်) – Sliced Burmese tofu curried with fresh tomatoes, onions and garlic, cooked in peanut oil and fish sauce, and garnished with coriander and green chilli

=== Noodle curries ===
Specially prepared curries also form the base for several Burmese noodle dishes, including:

- Ohn no khauk swe (အုန်းနို့ခေါက်ဆွဲ) – a coconut milk noodle soup, served in a broth of chicken curry
- Shwedaung khauk swe (ရွှေတောင်ခေါက်ဆွဲ) – a dry noodle dish of egg noodles, served with chicken curry and coconut milk
- Nangyi thoke (နန်းကြီးသုပ်) – a salad of thick rice noodles, mixed with chicken curry and gravy
- Panthay khauk swe (ပန်းသေးခေါက်ဆွဲ) – a fried noodle dish of Chinese Muslim origin, served with a chicken curry cooked in a blend of spices including cardamom, cloves, star anise, and bay leaf

== Regional adaptations ==
=== Kaeng hang le ===
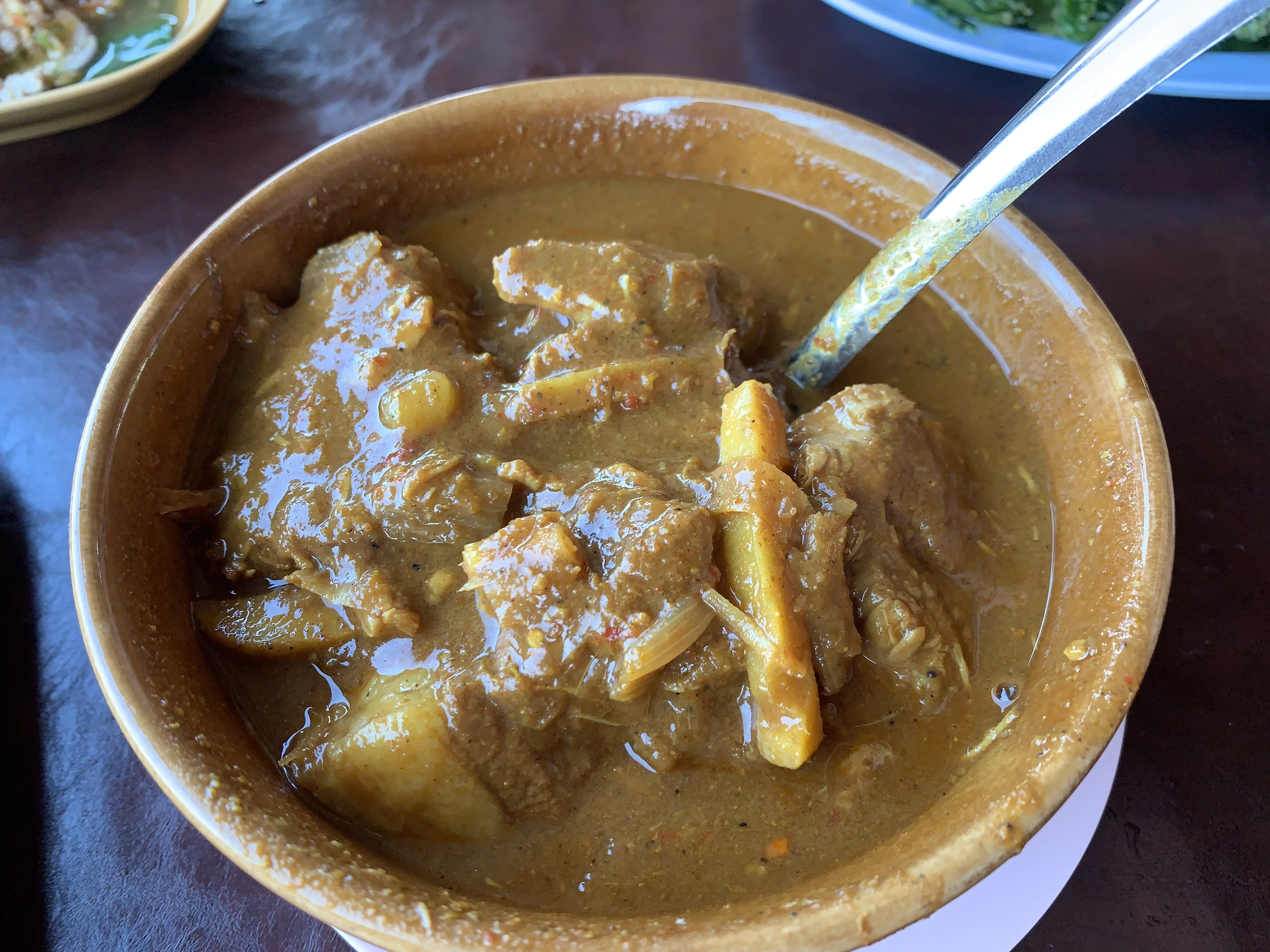
Kaeng hang le from Chiang Rai

Kaeng hang le is a pork curry and a regional specialty in Northern Thailand. It is a local adaptation of similar Burmese pork curries; the name "hang le" is derived from the Burmese word "hin lay" (ဟင်းလေး, transcribed hang le), which means "heavy curry." Many restaurants in Chiang Mai call it ‘Burmese curry.’

=== Khow suey ===
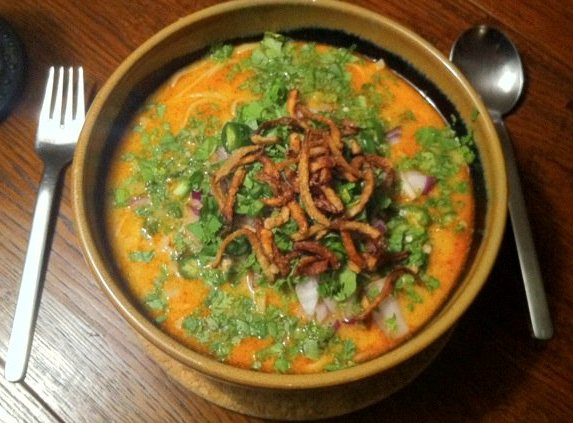
A bowl of khow suey

Khow suey, also known as khausa, is a South Asian adaptation of the Burmese coconut milk curry noodle soup called ohn no khao swè. It was introduced to the region by the Memon community of India who adapted this dish, likely coinciding with the emigration of South Asians from Burma in the 1960s, and is now a Memon specialty.

== See also ==
- Burmese cuisine
- Kaeng hang le
