= Kaeng hang le =

Northern Thai curry dish

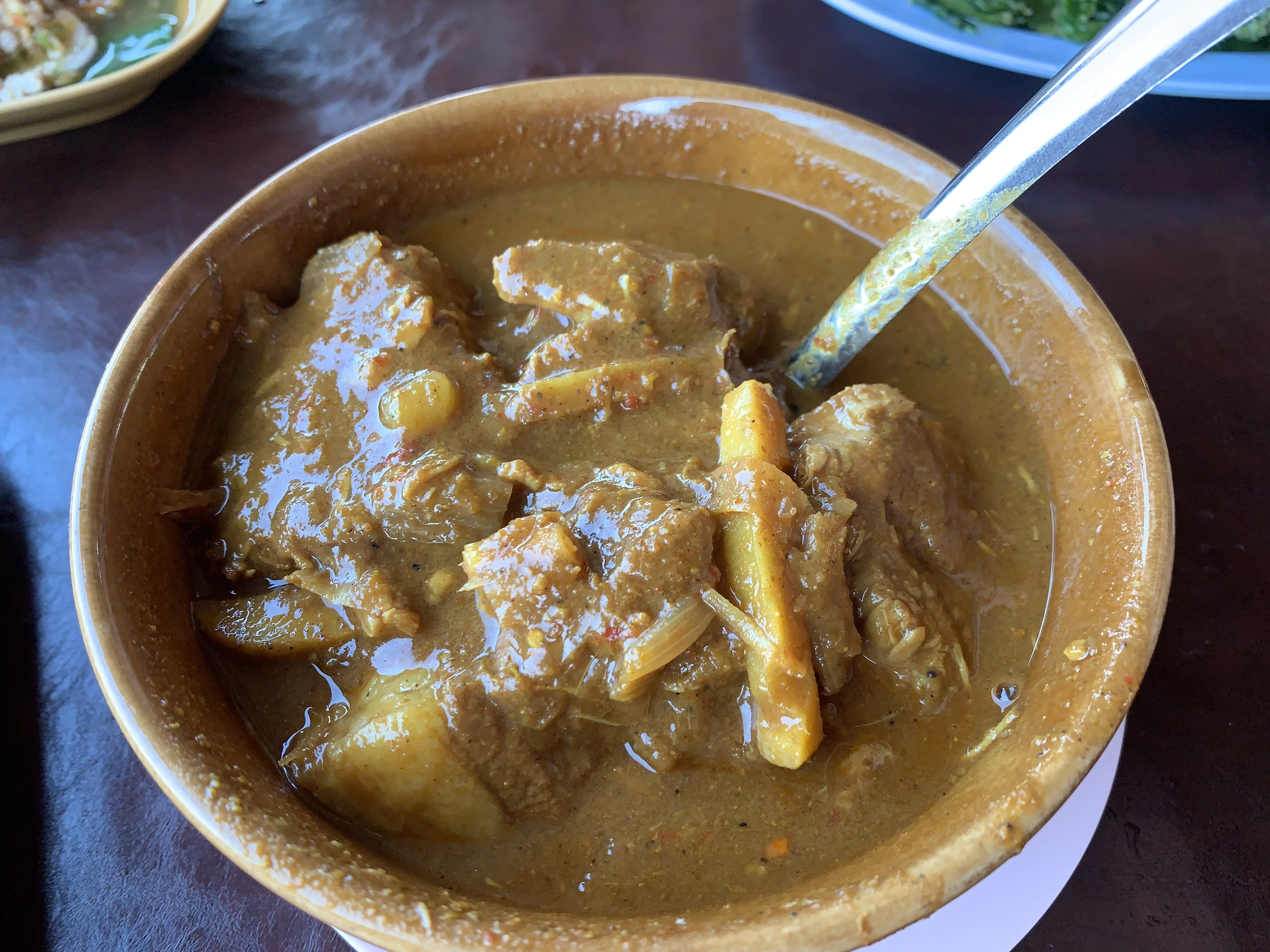
- Kaeng hang le curry in Chiang Rai
- Place of origin: Thailand
- Region or state: Northern Thailand
- Main ingredients: Pork, masala spice mix
- Food energy (per serving): 540 calories
- Similar dishes: Burmese pork curry

Kaeng hang le (Thai: แกงฮังเล, pronounced [kɛ̄ːŋ hāŋ lēː]; Northern Thai: แก๋งฮังเล, pronounced [kɛ̌ːŋ hāŋ lēː]) is a rich Northern Thai pork curry. Hang le curry is very popular in Northern Thailand, well-known as a specialty of the region. It differs from traditional northern Thai curries in several respects: it is typically eaten with long-grained rice, not sticky rice, and uses dried spices, which are commonly used in Burmese, but not northern Thai curries. The curry is commonly served as a festive dish in northern Thailand.

== Origins ==
Kaeng hang le originates from Myanmar, and the name "hang le" is derived from the Burmese word "hin lay" (ဟင်းလေး, transcribed hang le), which means "heavy curry." In fact, many restaurants in Chiang Mai call it ‘Burmese curry.’ From 1579 to 1775, the Lan Na kingdom was ruled by the Burmese, until it became a vassal state of Siam in the late 1700s. The dish may have been introduced to northern Thailand by the Shan people, who live in Myanmar's Shan State, which borders Northern Thailand. In neighbouring Myanmar, a pork curry called wet tha hin (ဝက်သားဟင်း) includes a sour component, just as the Thai version includes tamarind.

== Ingredients and preparation ==
Kaeng hang le is made using a curry paste of fresh herbs like lemongrass, galangal, garlic, shallots, shrimp paste (kapi), dried chilies, and salt, all of which are pounded in a mortar and pestle. The pork is then marinated with the curry paste, seasoned with a masala spice mix, black soy sauce, fish sauce, and then slowly simmered with julienned ginger, garlic, shallots, pickled garlic, peanuts, and santol until a layer of oil has risen to the top.

Kaeng hang le is traditionally made with pork belly, but can be substituted with chicken, beef or fish. The masala spice mix used to make kaeng hang le (called phong masala or phong hang le) is composed of numerous dried spices, including long pepper, nutmeg, clove, camphor seeds, black pepper, mace, fennel, cumin, fenugreek, dried garlic, cinnamon, coriander seed, cubeb, chili, dried ginger, bay leaf, turmeric powder, white sesame seeds, and mustard seeds.

== Varieties ==
Kaeng hang le has several numerous varieties, which differ in terms of ingredients (e.g., sliced ginger), recipe proportions, and cooking methods.

- The Mae Hong Son style of kaeng hang le incorporates an aromatic base of shallots, garlic, and ginger, along with turmeric powder and masala, instead of a curry paste.
- The Chiang Saen style of kaeng hang le incorporates additional ingredients like asparagus beans, eggplants, fresh chilies, pickled bamboo shoots and roasted white sesame seeds.
- Kaeng ho (แกงโฮะ) is a Northern Thai dish made with leftover kaeng hang le, which is then stir-fried with glass noodles, pickled bamboo shoots, and kaffir lime leaves.

== See also ==
- Burmese curry
- Thai curry
- Rendang
- Massaman curry
- Northern Thailand
