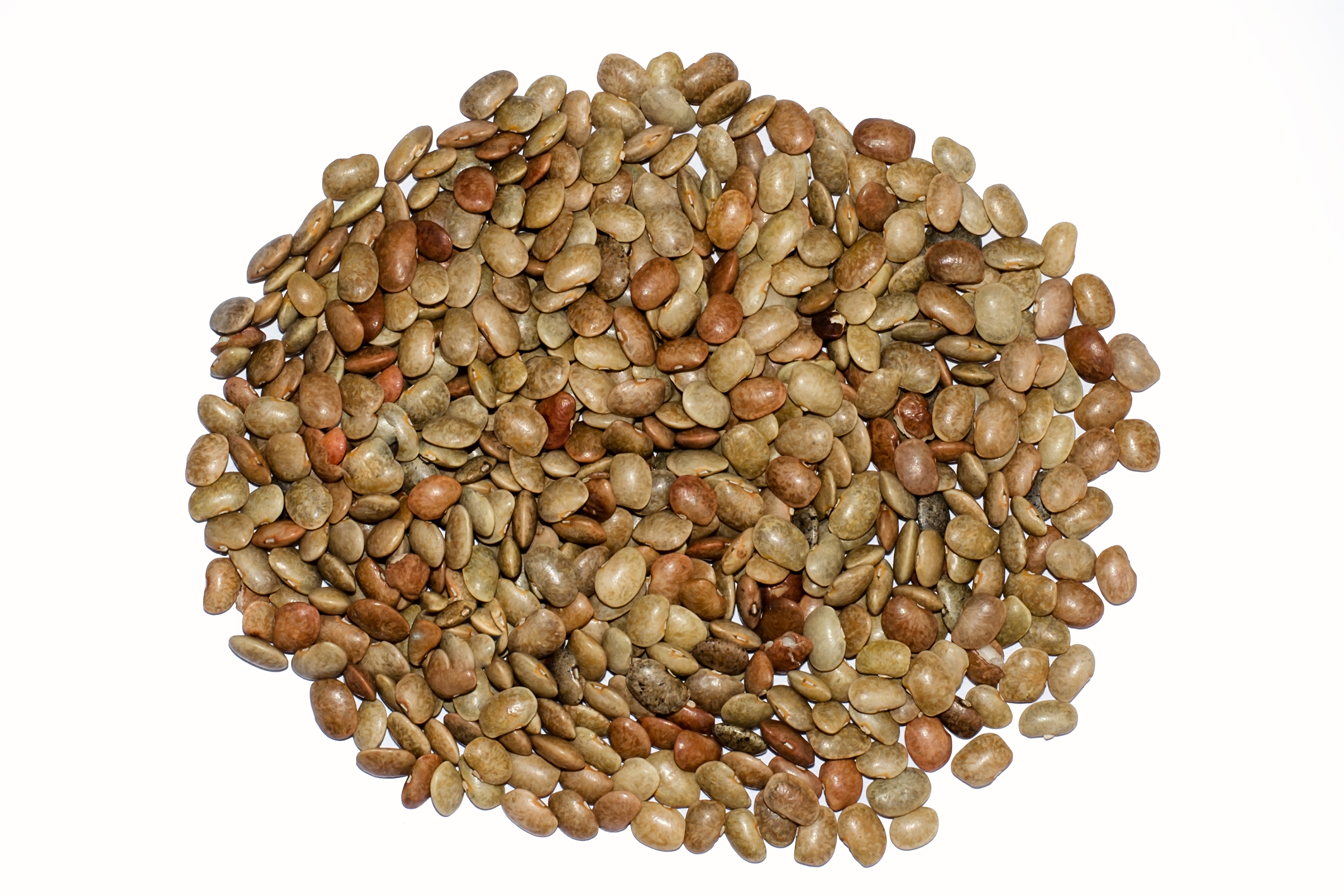
- Horse gram seeds

Scientific classification
- Kingdom: Plantae
- Clade: Tracheophytes
- Clade: Angiosperms
- Clade: Eudicots
- Clade: Rosids
- Order: Fabales
- Family: Fabaceae
- Subfamily: Faboideae
- Genus: Macrotyloma
- Species: M. uniflorum

Binomial name
- Macrotyloma uniflorum (Lam.) Verdc.

Varieties
- M. uniflorum var. benadirianum; M. uniflorum var. stenocarpum (Brenan) Verdc.; M. uniflorum var. uniflorum; M. uniflorum var. verrucosum

Synonyms
- Dolichos uniflorus Lam.; Glycine uniflora (Lam.) Dalzell; Kerstingiella uniflora (Lam.) J.A.Lackey

= Macrotyloma uniflorum =

Species of legume

Macrotyloma uniflorum (horsegram, also known as horse gram, kulthi bean, gahat, hurali, or Madras gram) is a legume native to tropical southern Asia. Known for its distinct taste and texture, its rich nutrients and reputed medicinal properties, it is widely used in many cuisines. It is also commonly grown for horse feed, hence the name "horse gram". Horse gram is grown in parts of India, Nepal, Malaysia, Sri Lanka, and the West Indies. Consumed whole, sprouted, or ground, it is also allowed to be eaten on some Hindu fasting days. Medical uses of these legumes are described in the Ayurveda.

== Description ==
Macrotyloma uniflorum is a perennial climbing plant with a rhizome, growing to a height of about 60 cm (24 in). The stem sprouts from the rhizome each year. It is clad in varying amounts of whitish hairs and bears alternate, trifoliate leaves with petioles up to 7 cm (2.8 in) long. The leaflets are obovate or elliptical, and up to 7 cm (2.8 in) long. The flowers are borne in twos or threes in the leaf axils, and are typical of the bean family with banner, wings and keel. They are cream, yellowish or green, often with a purple blotch inside. These are followed by linear-oblong, upcurving pods up to 8 cm (3.1 in) long, containing up to ten reddish-brown, speckled or black seeds. The seeds have a length of 3–6 mm (0.1–0.2 in).

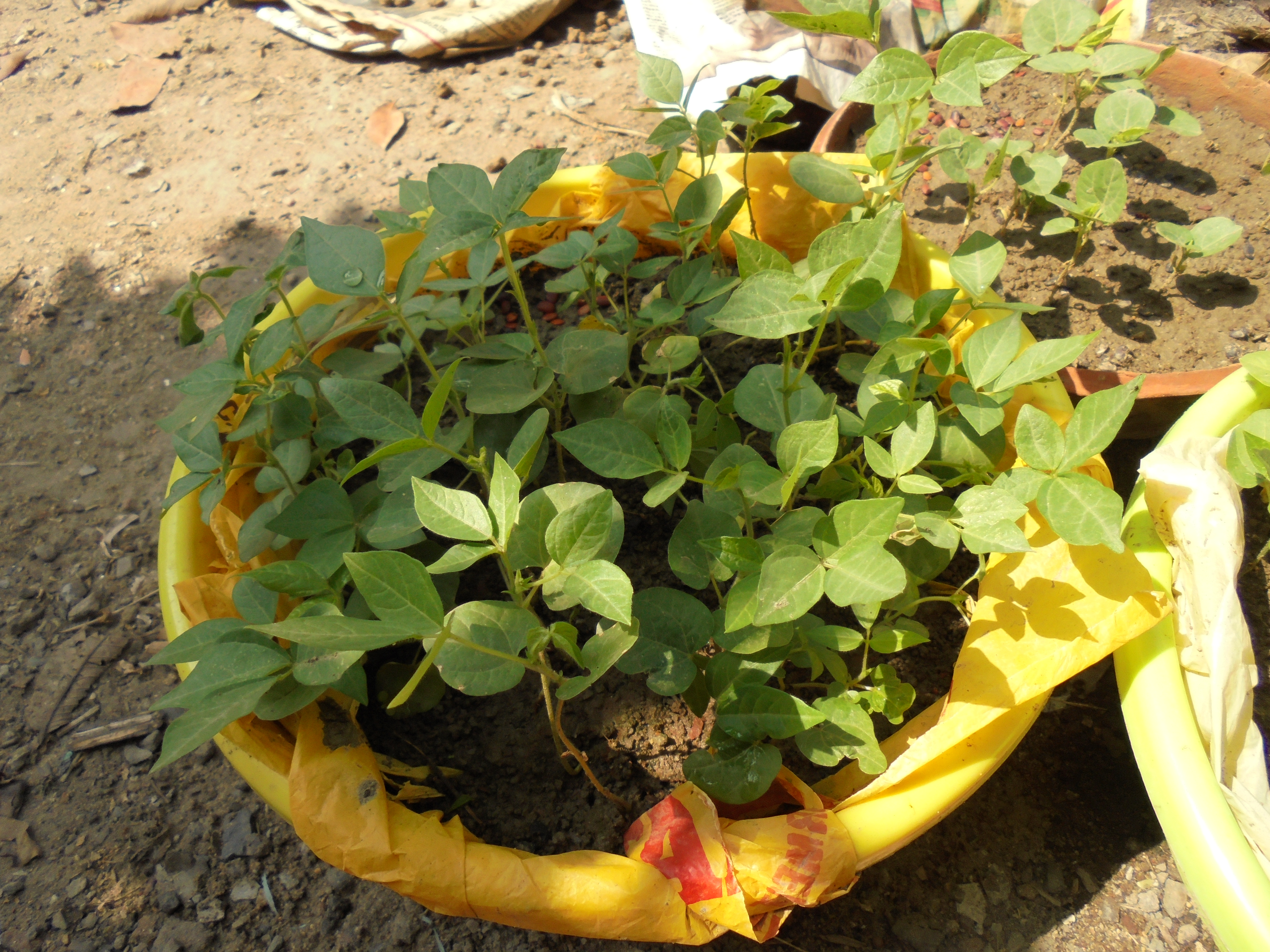
Young plant

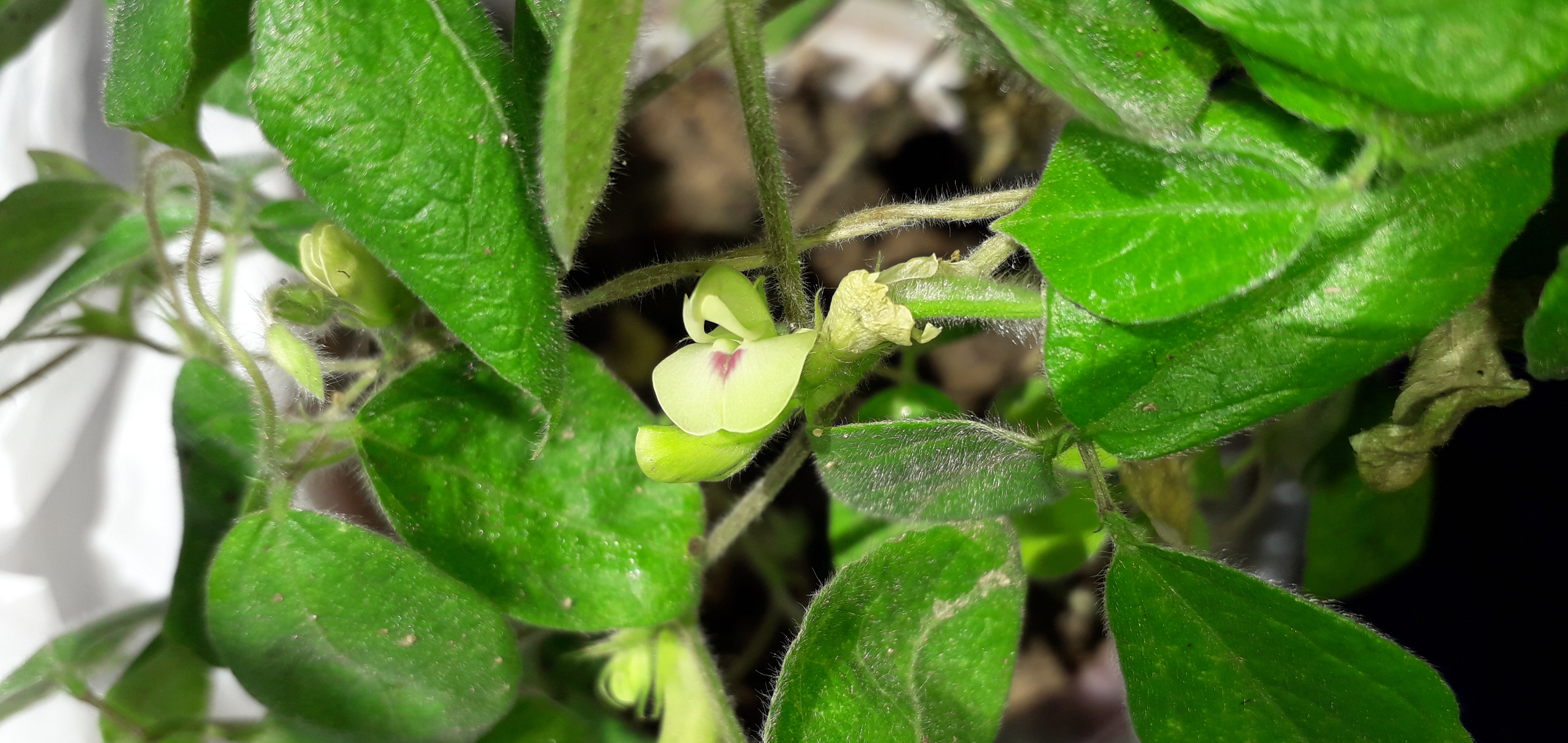
Flowers

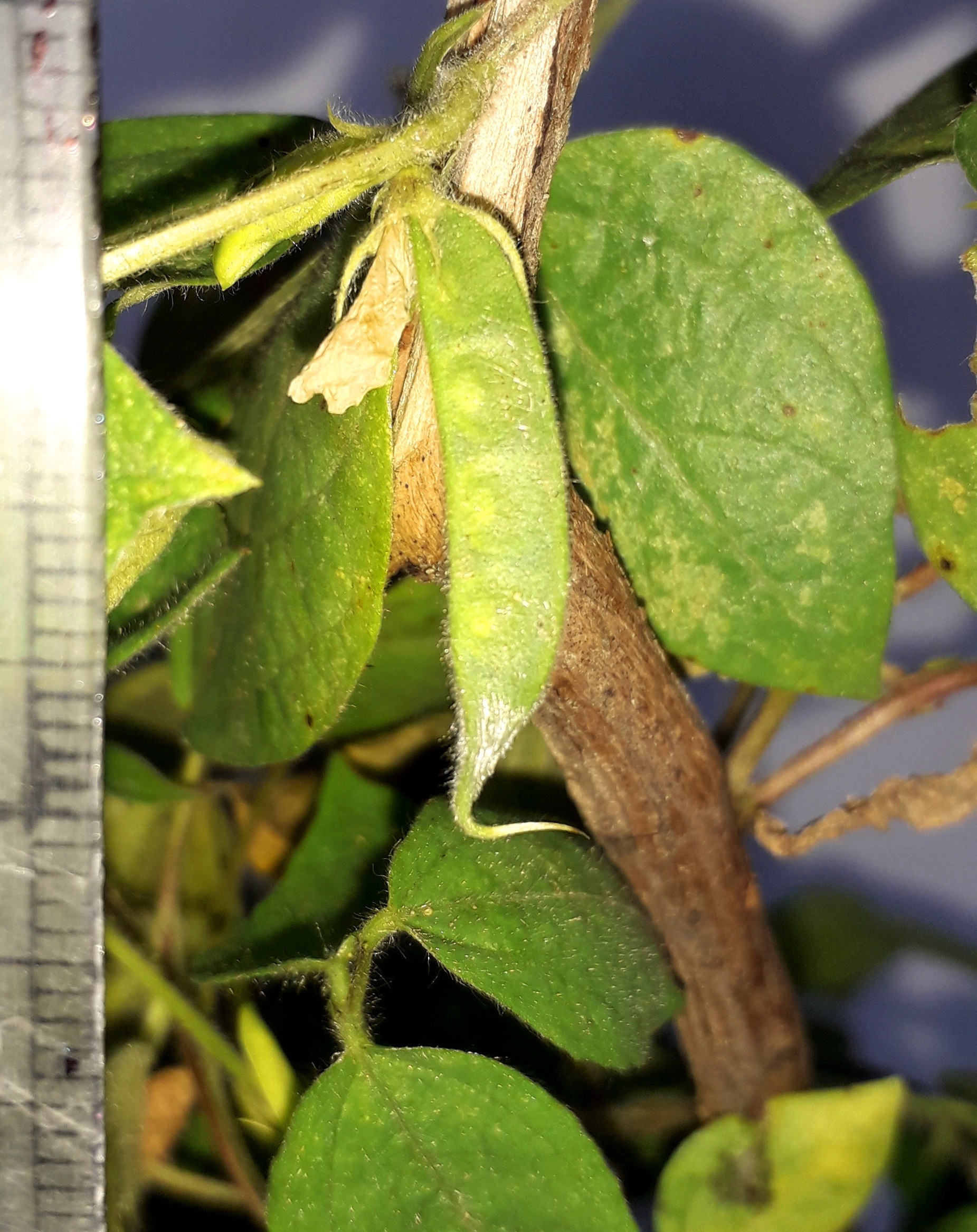
Young fruit

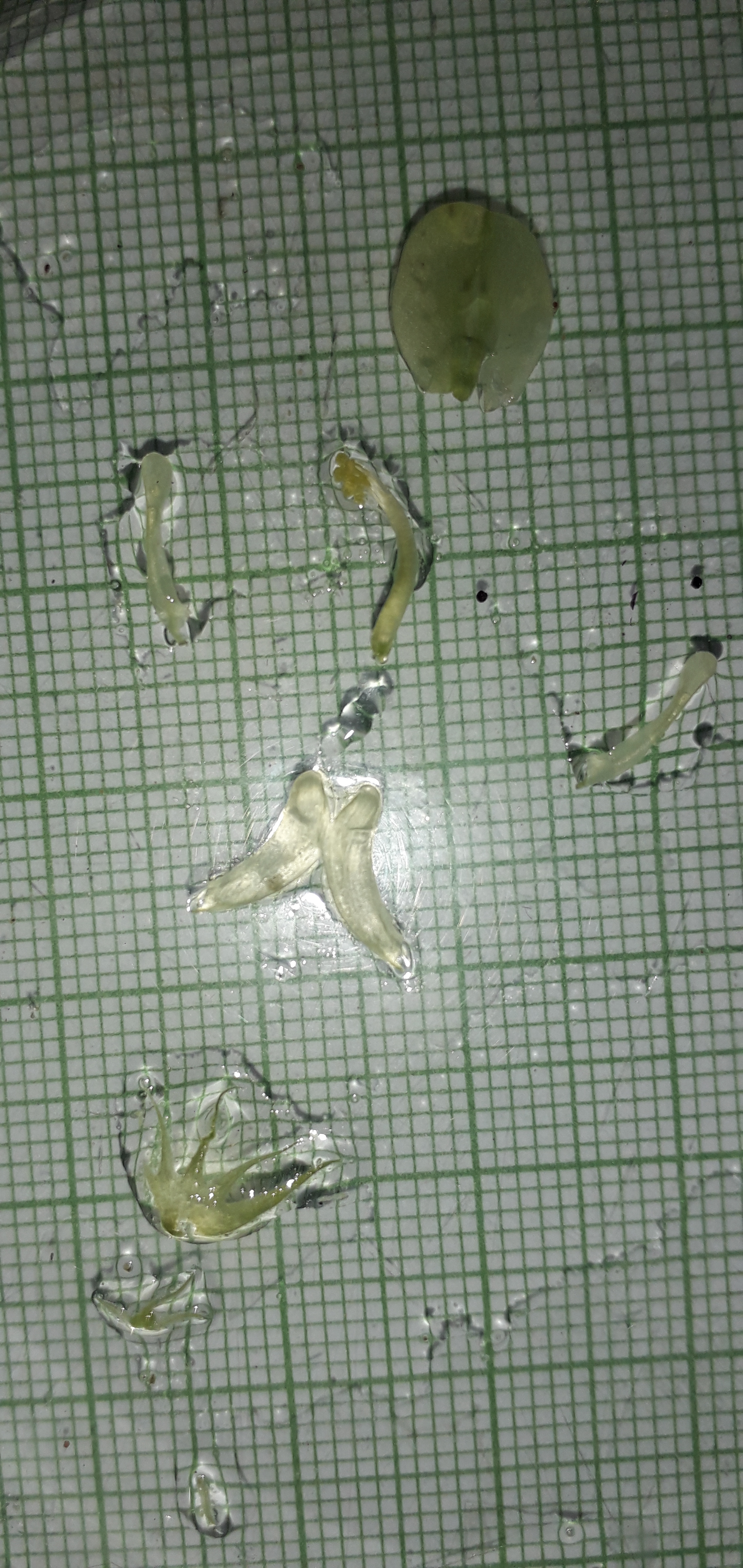
Dissection of floral parts

== Distribution ==
Horse gram is native to tropical southern Asia and has been found in archaeological sites in India, starting from 2500 BC. The plant was probably first domesticated in India, and is now grown as a legume from India to Myanmar. Additionally, the crop is also grown for fodder and green manure in tropical countries in southeastern Asia and northern Australia. Generally, the major growing areas of Macrotyloma uniflorum are located in India, Africa and Australia.

== Cultivation ==
Horse gram is drought tolerant and also withstands harsh environmental conditions such as salinity or metal stresses. Generally, Horse Gram is planted with low agronomic inputs and without weeding. Furthermore, the crop grows on a broad range of soil types with different pH ranges. Cultivation is also possible on soils with poor organic matter and nitrogen availability. Horse gram thrives where the temperature is in the range of 20 to 30 °C (68 to 86 °F). Frost temperatures are lethal. Due to the drought-resistance Macrotyloma uniflorum is grown in areas with low precipitation (300–900 mm (12–35 in)). In wetter areas, Horse gram is usually sown at the end of the rainy season to still facilitate cultivation. Nonetheless, Macrotyloma uniflorum does not tolerate waterlogging.

The plant is not only cultivated as a monoculture, but also as an inter- or mixed crop together with groundnut, sorghum, sesame, Niger, maize, finger millet, pearl millet, amaranth, marvel grass or kidney bean. Furthermore, Macrotyloma uniflorum can also be grown along with trees such as neem, white siris or babul. Both, grain and green forage yield are highly dependent on the growing region as well as the selected cropping system. Substantial yield differences in the various growing regions exist: In India green forage yield varies from 5 - 14 t/ha and in Australia approximately 4.4 t/ha are reported. Grain yield in India is around 0.13 – 1.2 t/ha and 1.1 – 2.2 t/ha in Australia.

== Pests ==
Yield-impacting diseases are anthracnose (Colletotrichum lindemuthianum), the yellow mosaic virus as well as powdery mildew. Other diseases affecting horse gram are dry root rot (Macrophomina phaseolina), rusts, aerial blight (Rhizoctonia solani) and leaf spot (Cercospora). The pod borer (Etiella zinckenella) and the pod fly (Melanagromyza obtusa) are the most damaging insect pests. Others are aphids (Aphis craccivora), hairy caterpillar (Azazia rubicans), pod caterpillar (Helicoverpa armigera), American serpentine leaf miner (Liriomyza trifolii), thrips, leaf hoppers and Callosobruchus as a storage pest.

== Nutrition ==
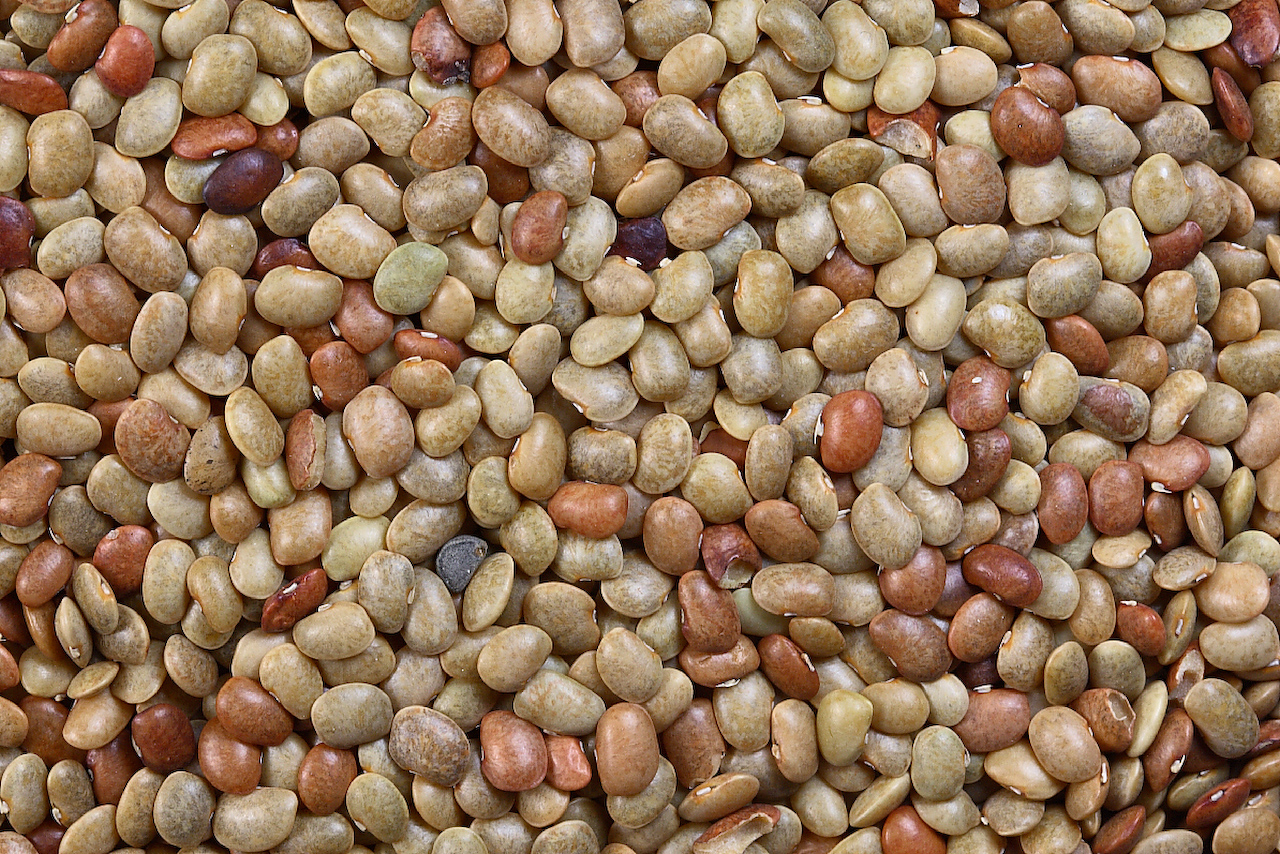
Horse gram seeds

Horse gram and moth bean are legumes of the tropics and subtropics, grown mostly under dry-land agriculture. The chemical composition is comparable with more commonly cultivated legumes. Like other legumes, these are deficient in methionine and tryptophan, though horse gram is an excellent source of iron and molybdenum. Comparatively, horse gram seeds have higher trypsin inhibitor and hemagglutinin activities and natural phenols than most bean seeds. Natural phenols are mostly phenolic acids, namely, 3,4-dihydroxybenzoic, 4-hydroxybenzoic, vanillic, caffeic, p-coumaric, ferulic, syringic and sinapic acids. Though both require prolonged cooking, a soak solution (1.5% NaHCO_{3} + 0.5% Na_{2}CO_{3} + 0.75% citric acid) has been shown to reduce cooking time and improve protein quality.

Horse gram seed contains carbohydrate (57.2% w/w), protein (22% w/w), dietary fiber (5.3% w/w), fat (0.50% w/w), calcium (287 mg), phosphorus (311 mg), iron (6.77 mg) and calories (321 kcal) as well as vitamins like thiamine (0.4 mg), riboflavin (0.2 mg) and niacin (1.5 mg) per 100 grams of dry matter. The nutritional content is partly dependent on soil conditions and the weather. The less appealing taste has led it to be not commonly eaten.

The carbohydrate-fraction of horse gram flour consists of oligo-saccharides and starches. The starches can be divided in terms of digestability in those that can be digested and uptaken in the small intestine, and those that partly will fermented in the colon by the microflora. The latter ones, called resistant starches, account for 43.4% of the carbohydrate content of horse gram flour. Oligo-saccharides such as raffinose and stachyose contribute to digestion difficulties. The fermentation in the colon often may lead to flatulence and diarrhoea, given the high concentration of both, resistant starches and oligo-saccharides, for horse gram longer cooking times, and other treatments are needed. Enzymatic treatments with xylanase has the goal to improve the functional and expansive properties of horse gram seeds in order to facilitate the use as an ingredient in the food industry. By following a high temperature short time (HTST) treatment, the content of phytic acid, tannins and protease-inhibitors could be reduced by 46%, 61% and 92% respectively. The flour resulting from this treatment had higher water- and oil-absorption capabilities. Those improvements in digestibility and processibility could make horsegram an interesting protein- and flour source for the food industry.

== Breeding ==
Globally, southwest India and the African continent are regarded as horse gram gene-rich regions. From the 1970s, germplasm of horse gram has been conserved. The US Department of Agriculture's (USDA) Germplasm Resources Information Network (GRIN) has preserved 35 accessions of horse gram, the Australian Tropical Crops and Forages Genetic Resources Centre, has 38 accessions and the Kenya Agricultural Research Institute (KARI) has conserved 21 accessions.

A large amount of drought resistance genes exist in horse gram and grain yield enhancement represents the main breeding goal. Little attention has been given to the genome structure and organization of horse gram. The use of new genes for horse gram breeding could benefit from genetic data on numerous phenological and morphological features. These may impact agronomic methods and crop productivity. Many unfavorable traits such as late flowering, indeterminate twining growth habit, long and thin stem, thermo- and photosensitivity and a poor harvest index exist in horse gram. The digestability and processability improvements described in Nutrition section implicitly suggest to consider the reduction of phytic acid content, tannins and protease-inhibitors as additional breeding goals.

== Medicinal uses ==
Scientists from the Indian Institute of Chemical Technology have found that unprocessed raw horse gram seeds not only possess antihyperglycemic properties, but also have qualities which reduce insulin resistance. The scientists made a comparative analysis between horse gram seeds and their sprouts and found that the seeds have greater beneficial effects on the health of hyperglycemic individuals. The majority of antioxidant properties are confined to the seed coat and its removal would not do any good. Raw horse gram seed is rich in polyphenols, flavonoids, and proteins, major antioxidants present in fruits and other food materials. The seed has the ability to reduce postprandial hyperglycemia by slowing down carbohydrate digestion and reducing insulin resistance by inhibiting protein-tyrosine phosphatase 1 beta enzyme.

== Indian regional specifics ==
In India, it is also known as ulavalu, gahat, muthira, kulath, khollu or kulthi. It is used to make popular dishes like Kulitan Saaru, Kulitan Upkari, Kulitan Ghassi (coconut curry preparation), and an idli-like preparation (but not fermented) called Kulitan Sannan.

- In Telangana and Andhra Pradesh, horse gram, called ఉలవలు (ulavalu) in Telugu, is prescribed for jaundice or as a diuretic, and as part of a weight-loss diet. It is considered helpful for iron deficiencies. Ulavacharu (horse gram soup) is popular dish in Telangana, Andhra Pradesh, it is served with cooked rice in some of the Telugu-speaking people's weddings and ceremonies.
- In Darjeeling and Sikkim, horse gram called गहत (gahat) in Nepali is considered a medicinal food. It is given to children suffering from mumps. Water in which gahat is soaked is taken by people suffering from kidney stones in the belief that this dissolves the crystals. Gahat's use is specially reserved for the cold winters, when its heat-producing properties are most useful.
- In Kerala, horse gram, called മുതിര (muthira) in Malayalam is used in special kinds of dishes.
- In Tamil Nadu, horse gram, called கொள்ளு (kollu) in northern districts and காணம் (kaanam) in southern districts is commonly used in Tamil dishes, including kollu chutney, kollu porial, kollu avial, kollu sambar and kollu rasam.
- In Maharashtra and Goa, horse gram is called हुलगा/हुलगे/कुलीथ (hulage/hulaga/kulith) in Marathi and कुुली (kulith) in Konkani is often used to make aamati, kulith usal, pithla and shengule/shevanti
- In Karnataka cuisine, ಹುರಳಿಸಾರು (huraḷi saaru) is more popular, because of ಹುರಳಿ (huraḷi) is a main ingredient. Huraḷi is also used in preparations such as usali, chutney, bassaru, and upsaaru or upinsaru (particularly in the Old Mysore Regions Mandya and Chamrajnagara Districts).
- In South Canara region of Karnataka, in Tulu, it is also called kudu (ಕುಡು).
- In Odisha it is known by the name କୋଳଥ (Koḷatha).
- Gahat or kulath is a major ingredient in the food of Pahari region of northern India.
- In Himachal Pradesh, kulath is used to make khichdi. In Uttarakhand, it is cooked in a round iron saute pan (kadhai) to prepare ras, a favorite of most Kumaonis. In Garhwal region, another more elaborate dish is phanu which is made in a kadhai with roughly ground gahat (previously soaked overnight) boiled over several hours. Towards the end, some finely chopped greens (palak or spinach, rai, tender radish leaves, or dhania (coriander leaves) if nothing else is available) are added to complete the dish. Served with boiled rice, jhangora (a millet-like grain, used as a staple by poorer Garhwalis only a decade ago and now a prized health-food).

In Myanmar (Burma), horse gram is known as pe bazat (ပဲပိစပ်) in Burmese. It is commonly used in making pon ye gyi, a fermented bean paste used in traditional Burmese cuisine.
