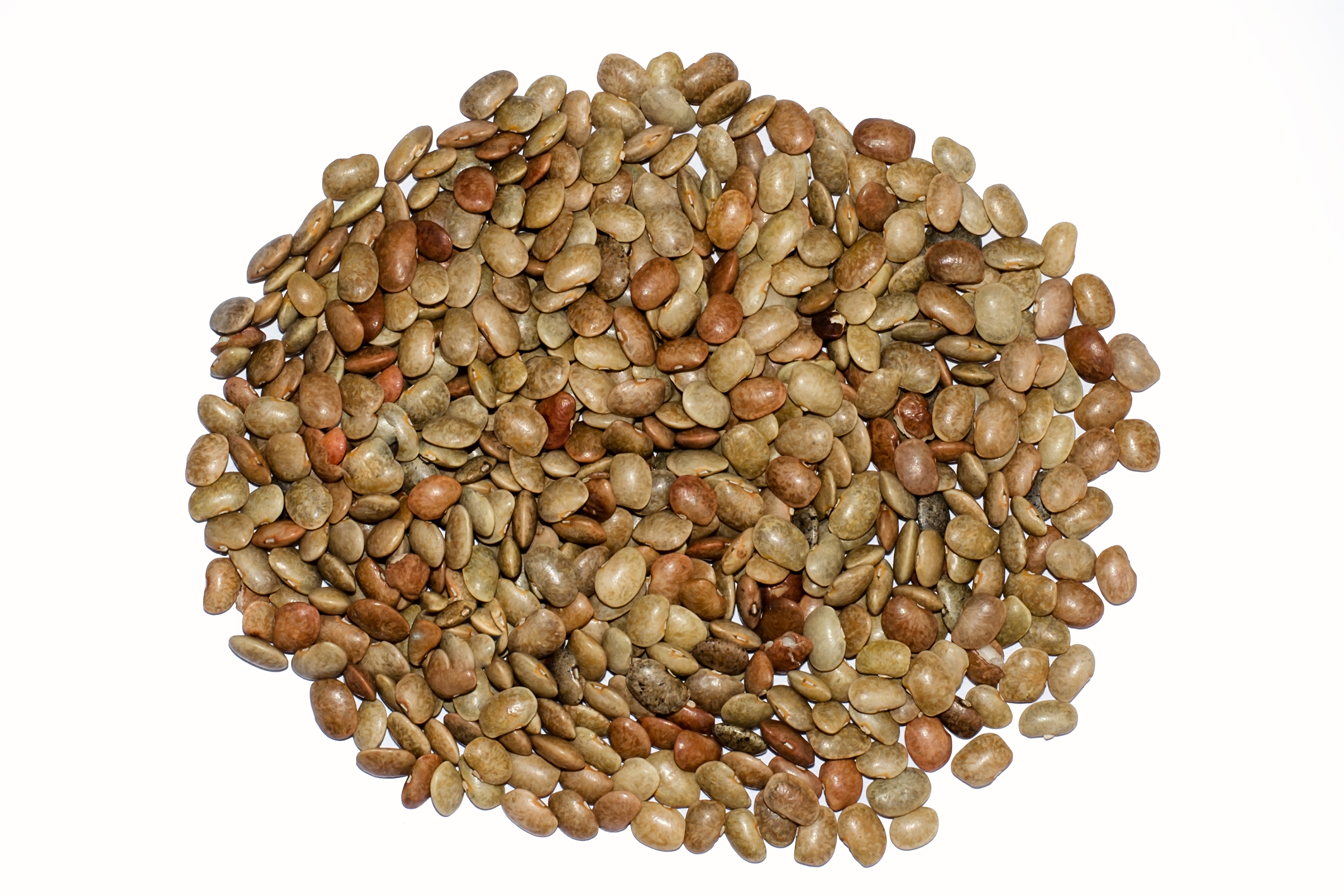
- horse gram beans

Scientific classification
- Kingdom: Plantae
- Clade: Tracheophytes
- Clade: Angiosperms
- Clade: Eudicots
- Clade: Rosids
- Order: Fabales
- Family: Fabaceae
- Subfamily: Faboideae
- Subtribe: Phaseolinae
- Genus: Macrotyloma (Wight & Arn.) Verdc. 1970

Species
- ~24, see text

Synonyms
- Kerstingiella Harms 1908

= Macrotyloma =

Genus of legumes

Macrotyloma is a genus of plants in the legume family which include several species of edible beans. Some species are also used as fodder for livestock.

Species include:

- Macrotyloma africanum (Brenan ex R. Wilczek) Verdc.
- Macrotyloma axillare (E. Mey.) Verdc. - perennial horse gram
- Macrotyloma biflorum (Schumach. & Thonn.) Hepper
- Macrotyloma daltonii
- Macrotyloma densiflorum
- Macrotyloma ellipticum
- Macrotyloma geocarpum - Kersting's groundnut, ground bean
- Macrotyloma maranguense
- Macrotyloma oliganthum
- Macrotyloma rupestre
- Macrotyloma stenophyllum (Harms) Verdc.
- Macrotyloma stipulosum
- Macrotyloma tenuiflorum
- Macrotyloma uniflorum (Lam.) Verdc. - horse gram, kulthi
  - M. uniflorum var. benadirianum (Chiov.) Verdc.
