= Khauk swè thoke =

Wheat noodle salad

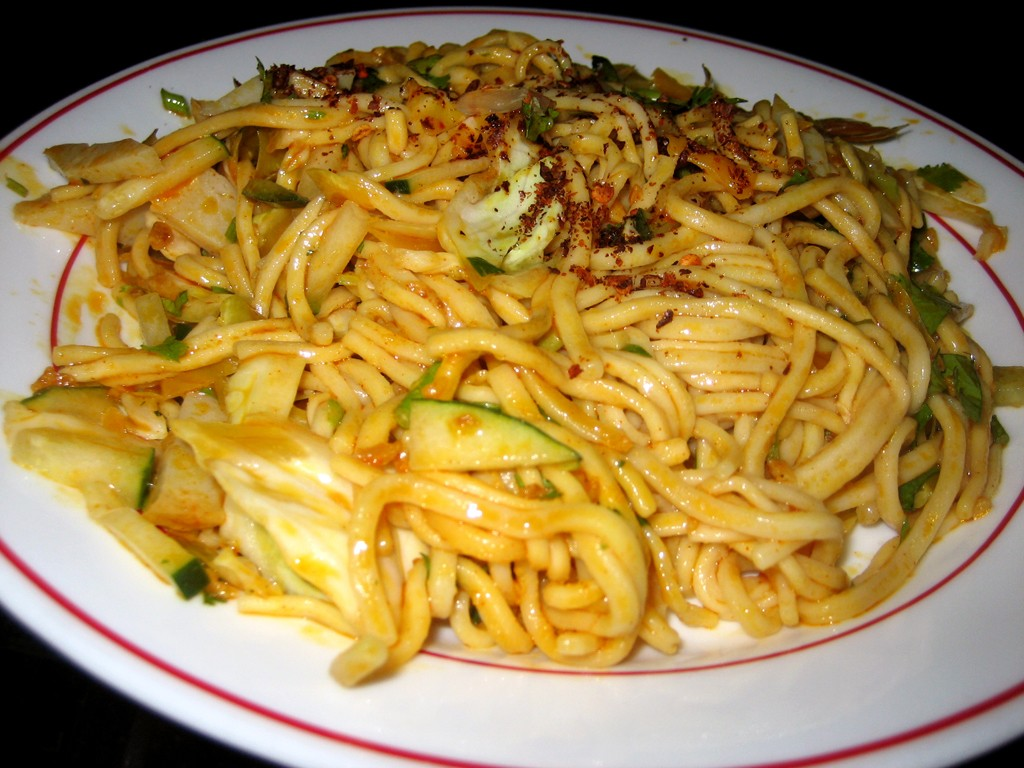
- Khauk swè thoke
- Course: Breakfast, lunch
- Place of origin: Myanmar
- Main ingredients: Wheat noodles, dried shrimp, shredded cabbage and carrots, fish cake slices, peanut oil, fish sauce, lime
- Variations: Atho

Khauk swè thoke (Burmese: ခေါက်ဆွဲသုပ်‌; pronounced [kʰaʊʔ sʰwɛ́ θoʊʔ]; lit. 'noodle salad') is an a thoke salad dish in Burmese cuisine. A wheat noodle salad, it is made with dried shrimp, shredded cabbage, carrots, fish sauce, lime and dressed with fried peanut oil.

After World War II, over 300,000 ethnic Indians in Burma, including Tamils from Tamil Nadu, Telugus from Andhra Pradesh and Marwaris from the Marwar region of India's Rajasthan, immigrated to India. After returning to India, they brought their food culture also along with them. In Thanjavur, Tamil Nadu, migrants sell khauk swe, which is commonly eaten in the area called Burma Colony. In Chennai, India, a version of the dish, called atho (from Burmese: အသုပ်), is sold by street vendors.

== See also ==
- Burmese salads
