= Macrotyloma biflorum =

Scientific classification
- Kingdom: Plantae
- Clade: Tracheophytes
- Clade: Angiosperms
- Clade: Eudicots
- Clade: Rosids
- Order: Fabales
- Family: Fabaceae
- Subfamily: Faboideae
- Genus: Macrotyloma
- Species: M. biflorum

Binomial name
- Macrotyloma biflorum (Schumach. & Thonn.) Hepper

Synonyms
- List: Dolichos biflorus L.; Dolichos biflorus var. occidentalis Harms; Dolichos chrysanthus A.Chev.; Dolichos chrysanthus var. occidentalis (Harms) R.Wilczek; Dolichos occidentalis (Harms) Harms; Dolichos woolawa Roxb. ex Wight & Arn.; Glycine biflora Schumach. & Thonn.; Johnia congesta Dalzell & A.Gibson; Kerstingiella biflora (Schumach. & Thonn.) J.A.Lackey; Macrotyloma chrysanthum (A.Chev.) Verdc.; Macrotyloma chrysanthum var. occidentale (Harms) Verdc.

Species of plant

Macrotyloma biflorum (syn. Dolichos biflorus) is a species of flowering plant in the family Fabaceae. It is native to west Tropical Africa, Chad, Sudan, Ethiopia, Angola, and Zambia. A climbing perennial, it is typically found in the seasonally dry tropics. It is fire-adapted.

== Subtaxa ==
The following varieties are accepted:

- Macrotyloma biflorum var. appressepuberulum Verdc.
- Macrotyloma biflorum var. biflorum
