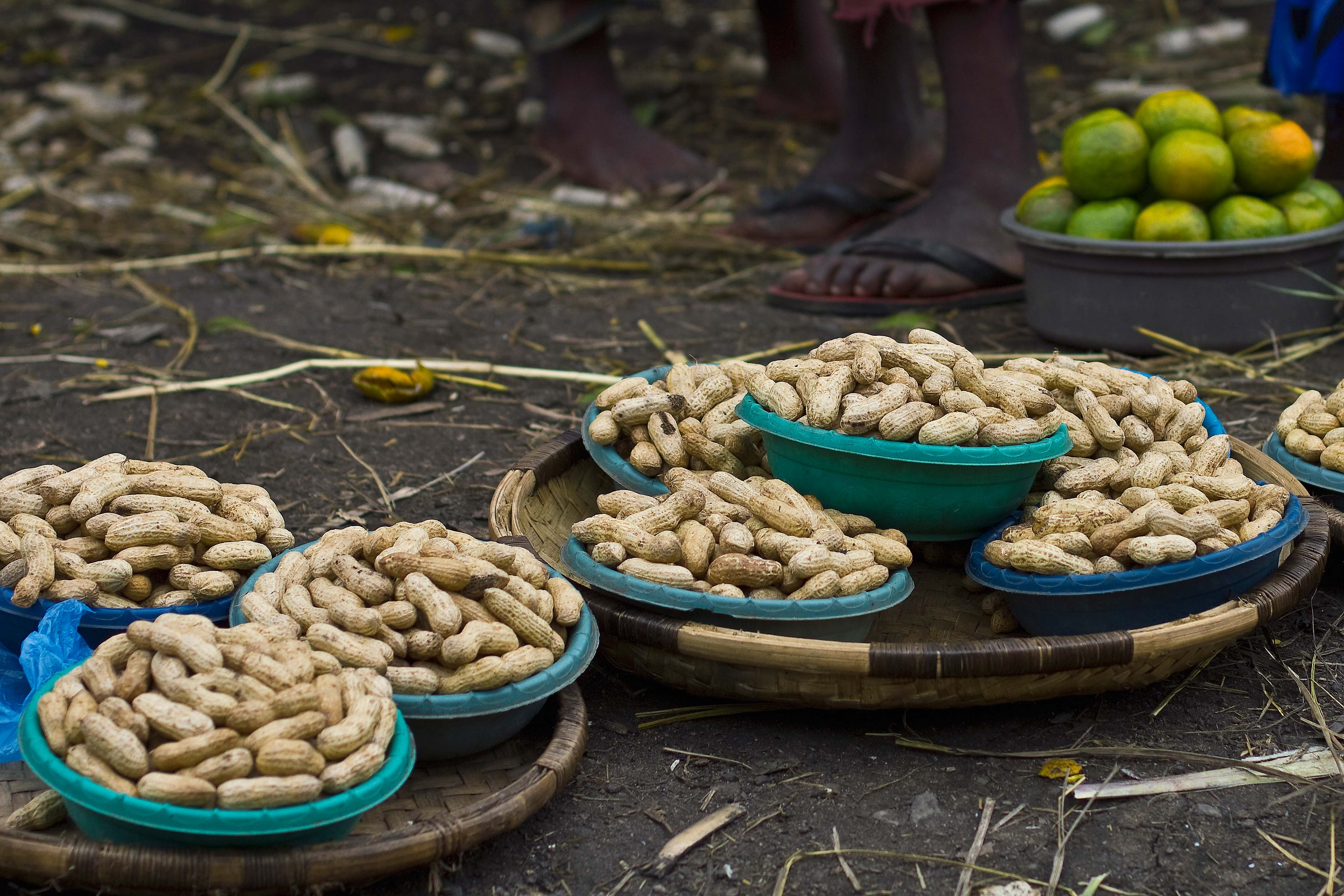

Conservation status
- Least Concern (IUCN 3.1)

Scientific classification
- Kingdom: Plantae
- Clade: Embryophytes
- Clade: Tracheophytes
- Clade: Spermatophytes
- Clade: Angiosperms
- Clade: Eudicots
- Clade: Rosids
- Order: Fabales
- Family: Fabaceae
- Subfamily: Faboideae
- Genus: Macrotyloma
- Species: M. geocarpum

Binomial name
- Macrotyloma geocarpum (Harms) Maréchal & Baudet

Synonyms
- Kerstingiella geocarpum Harms

= Macrotyloma geocarpum =

Species of flowering plant

Macrotyloma geocarpum is also known as the ground bean, geocarpa groundnut, Hausa groundnut, or Kersting's groundnut. In French, it is often called la lentille de terre. M. geocarpum is an herbaceous annual plant and a crop of minor economic importance in sub-Saharan Africa, tolerant of drought, with a growth habit similar to that of the peanut.

Geocarpa groundnut, dried
Nutritional value per 100 g (3.5 oz)
- Energy: 1,457 kJ (348 kcal)
- Carbohydrates: 66.6 g
- Dietary fiber: 5.5 g
- Fat: 1.1 g
- Protein: 19.4 g
Vitamins and minerals
Vitamins	Quantity %DV^{†}
Thiamine (B1)	63% 0.76 mg
Riboflavin (B2)	15% 0.19 mg
Niacin (B3)	14% 2.3 mg
Vitamin C	0% 0.0 mg
Minerals	Quantity %DV^{†}
Calcium	8% 103 mg
Iron	83% 15 mg
Phosphorus	31% 392 mg
Potassium	11% 332 mg
- ^{†}Percentages estimated using US recommendations for adults, except for potassium, which is estimated based on expert recommendation from the National Academies.

M. geocarpum is a pulse belonging to the legume family. It is primarily produced in western Africa, specifically in Benin and surrounding regions. It can provide nutrition, income, and the ability to alleviate hunger given the further production and enhancement of current practices.

Yields reach 500 kg/ha (450 lb/acre) in dry seed.

== Early 20th century, West Africa ==
Following the construction of the Nigerian railway system, which extended from Lagos in 1896 to Ibadan in 1900 and Kano in 1911, the Hausa of northern Nigeria became major producers of groundnuts. They surprised the British, who had expected the Hausa to turn to cotton production. However, the Hausa had sufficient agricultural expertise to realize cotton required more labor and the European prices offered for groundnuts were more attractive than those for cotton. "Within two years, the peasant farmers of Hausaland were producing so many tonnes of groundnuts that the railway was unable to cope with the traffic. As a result, the European merchants in Kano had to stockpile sacks of groundnuts in the streets." This is a great example of the African initiative taken by peasant producers to adapt to a cash economy. It is not clear, however, whether the "Hausa groundnut", M. geocarpum, was the groundnut being produced in such significant numbers, as peanuts and Bambara groundnuts are also grown in the region.

== Nutritional value ==
M. geocarpum is noted for relatively low yields, but high protein content and desirable flavour. Per 100g of dried seed, it consists of 9.7 g of water, 348 kcal, 19.4 g protein, 1.1 g fat, 66.6 g carbohydrates, 5.5 g fibre, 103 mg calcium, 392 mg phosphorus, 15 mg iron, 0.76 mg thiamin, 0.19 mg riboflavin, and 2.3 mg niacin. Leaves can also be eaten.

== Geography ==
Benin is located in the savanna of Africa which has weather conditions that are fairly humid in the south while being semiarid in the north . It offers growing conditions for a variety of crops that can be intercropped in the differing seasons, known as the dry season and rainy season, as well as having differing climate between the north and south. Southern climate is primarily stable, maintaining temperatures between 27 and 32 °C in the warmest season and 22 to 25 °C during the colder season. In the north, temperatures fluctuate between 27 and 32 °C in the dry season and 25 to 27 °C during the lowest season.

Mergeai notes that cultivated forms of Kersting's groundnut are known, but not commonly grown, in coastal African nations from Senegal to Nigeria. Tamini records the declining cultivation of Kersting's groundnut in the south west of Burkina Faso.

== Growing conditions ==
The geocarpa groundnut pod develops in the ground in pods in regions in Benin under the previously noted climate conditions. The growing conditions that allow for the success of the groundnut are seen in several countries across Africa in the savanna.

== Economics ==
While the groundnut provides nutrition and the potential to alleviate hunger in Africa, it also offers potential to reduce poverty by contributing economically to small-scale farmers. In Benin in 2012, a kilogram of the geocarpa groundnut could sell for $2–$4 - roughly three to five times the price of rice, and selling up to 30 bags a day produces noteworthy incomes. Specifically, incomes average $1000 a month for this product alone. Considering that this crop is being produced on an average of 0.48 ha of land, the underuse is evident. Increasing the area of farming land for this crop would be extremely beneficial to both producers and consumers, as it would allow for a greater generation of the crop and enhance the availability to the greater population. With the generation of $1000 monthly incomes, the possibilities that the geocarpa groundnut offer to the economies of small-scale farming in Benin and other regions is promising.

== Constraints to wider adoption ==
M geocarpum crops have been decreasing in production for years. The reduction is causing the adoption to halt, as farmers in regions new to the crop are unwilling to take chances with crops not seen to be a feasible option. With proper implementation and production practices, these constraints can be lifted. One problem is that it is viewed as crop for elders to farm; a reduction in plantation has been occurring and will continue to decrease unless wider adoption is met. Further education in agriculture practices could alleviate this issue.

Rusts and mildews can be problematic diseases for this crop in the more humid parts of its range.

M. geocarpum is indigenous to west Africa, but is not widely grown there, and shows low levels of morphological variation. The need to maintain genetic diversity and food security by continuing to grow this crop throughout its historical range may be more important than promoting its adoption in new regions. It is most widely grown where markets for it exist and where a history of religious and cultural significance for the crop is known.

== Gender involvement ==
Although variation in regions may be present, Benin is host to a very female-empowered agriculture enterprise. Holding the main role in marketplace interactions, women have an important role in both the production and sale of their products. In southern Benin, where primary production occurs, both men and women contribute. In the north, however, operations run by primarily females are dominant. Women contribute to the production of many underused crop species in Benin more than their counterparts, and the increase in production could enhance the position and empowerment of women in Africa.

== Practical information ==
The geocarpa groundnut can be rotated with other species, thus reducing the risk of health degradation to soils. Producing as much as possible without degrading soil quality is as important as the crop itself, but with proper implementation the production can carry on to harvests that will bring upon wealth, both in the economical and health sides of the matter.
