= Cassia flower bud salad =

Festive Burmese salad

Mezali phu thoke
- Alternative names: Cassia flower bud salad
- Type: Salad
- Place of origin: Myanmar (Burma)
- Region or state: Southeast Asia
- Associated cuisine: Burmese
- Main ingredients: Siamese cassia flower buds

Cassia flower bud salad (Burmese: မယ်ဇလီဖူးသုပ်; pronounced [mɛ̀zəlì pʰú θoʊʔ]; also known as mezali phu thoke) is a festive Burmese salad traditionally served during the full moon day of Tazaungmon, often as an satuditha offering.

The salad's base ingredients includes freshly picked Siamese cassia flower buds, boiled potatoes, sliced onions, peanuts, sesame seed, garlic, seasoned with salt, oil, sesame seeds, and lemon juice.

A common Burmese tradition during the full moon day of Tazaungmon is for families to pick Siamese cassia flower buds and prepare the buds, either as a salad or a soup. The flower buds are considered to have curative medicinal properties.

== See also ==
- Tazaungmon
