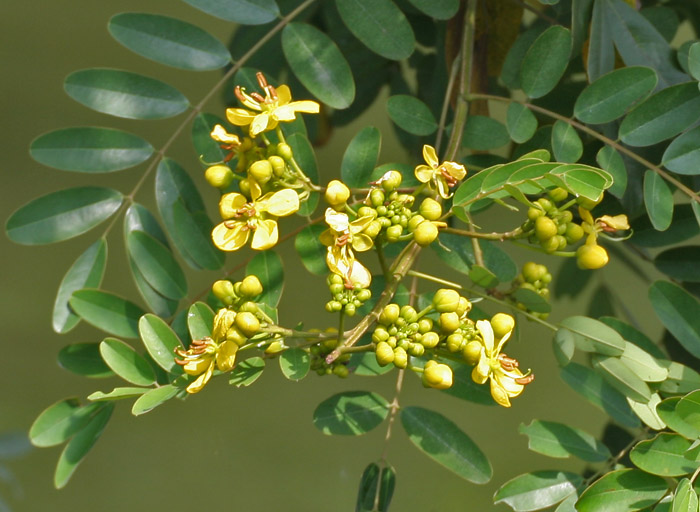

Scientific classification
- Kingdom: Plantae
- Clade: Tracheophytes
- Clade: Angiosperms
- Clade: Eudicots
- Clade: Rosids
- Order: Fabales
- Family: Fabaceae
- Subfamily: Caesalpinioideae
- Tribe: Cassieae
- Genus: Senna
- Species: S. siamea

Binomial name
- Senna siamea (Lam.) Irwin et Barneby

Synonyms
- Cassia arayatensis Naves; Cassia arborea Macfad.; Cassia florida Vahl; Cassia gigantea DC.; Cassia siamea Lam.; Cassia siamea var. puberula Kurz; Cassia sumatrana Roxb.; Cassia sumatrana DC.; Chamaefistula gigantea G.Don; Sciacassia siamea (Lam.) Britton & Rose S; Sciacassia siamea (Lam.) Britton; Senna sumatrana (DC.) Roxb.

= Senna siamea =

Species of legume

Senna siamea, also known as Siamese cassia, kassod tree, cassod tree and cassia tree, is a legume in the subfamily Caesalpinioideae. It is native to South and Southeast Asia, although its exact origin is unknown.

== Description ==
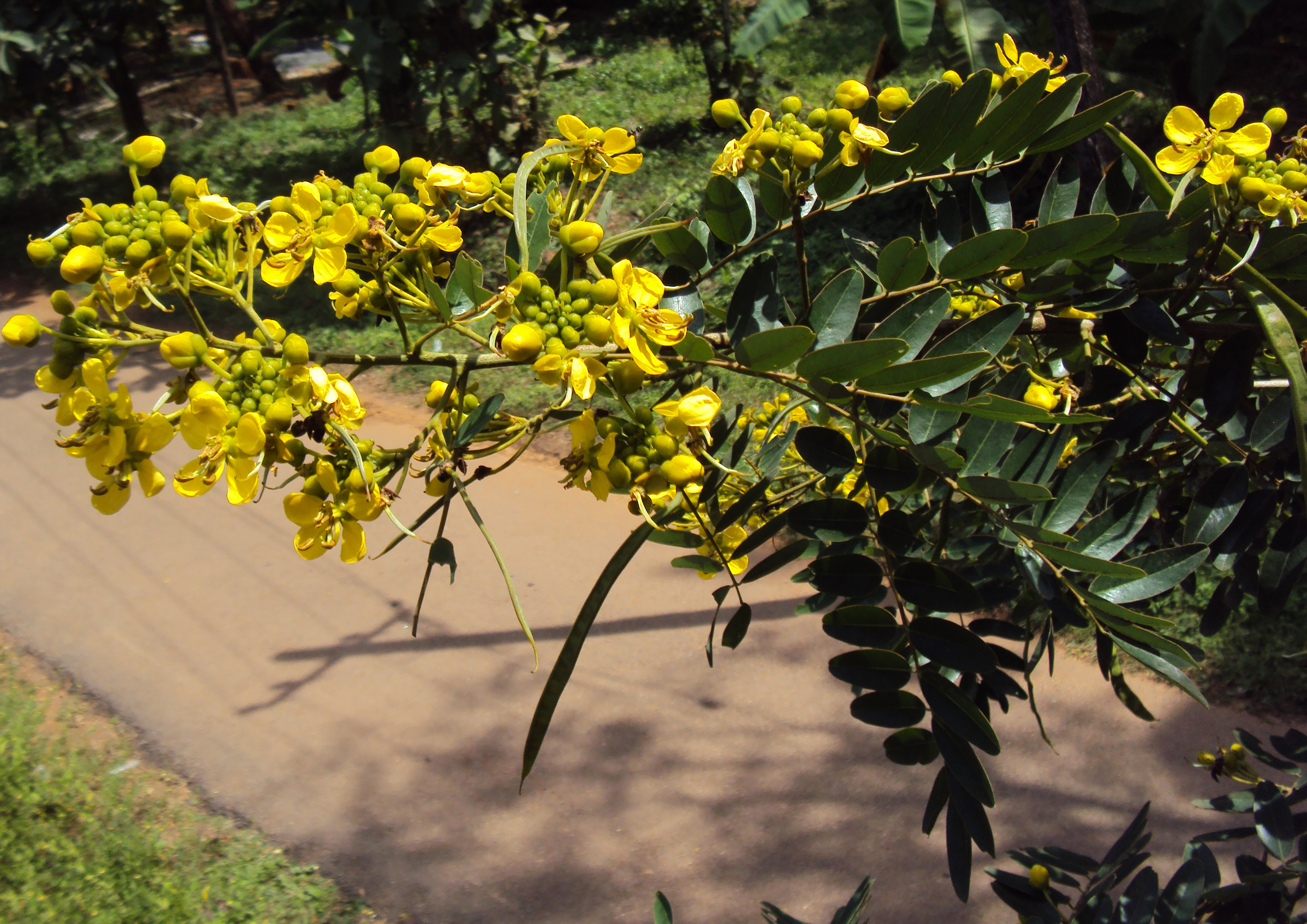
Leaves and flowers

It is a medium-size, evergreen tree growing up to 18 m (60 ft) with yellow flowers. Leaves are alternate, pinnately compound, with slender, green-reddish, tinged axis and 6 to 12 pairs of leaflets on short stalks, rounded at both ends.

It is often used as a shade tree in cocoa, coffee and tea plantations. In Thailand it is the provincial tree of Chaiyaphum Province and some places in the country are named after it.

== Uses ==
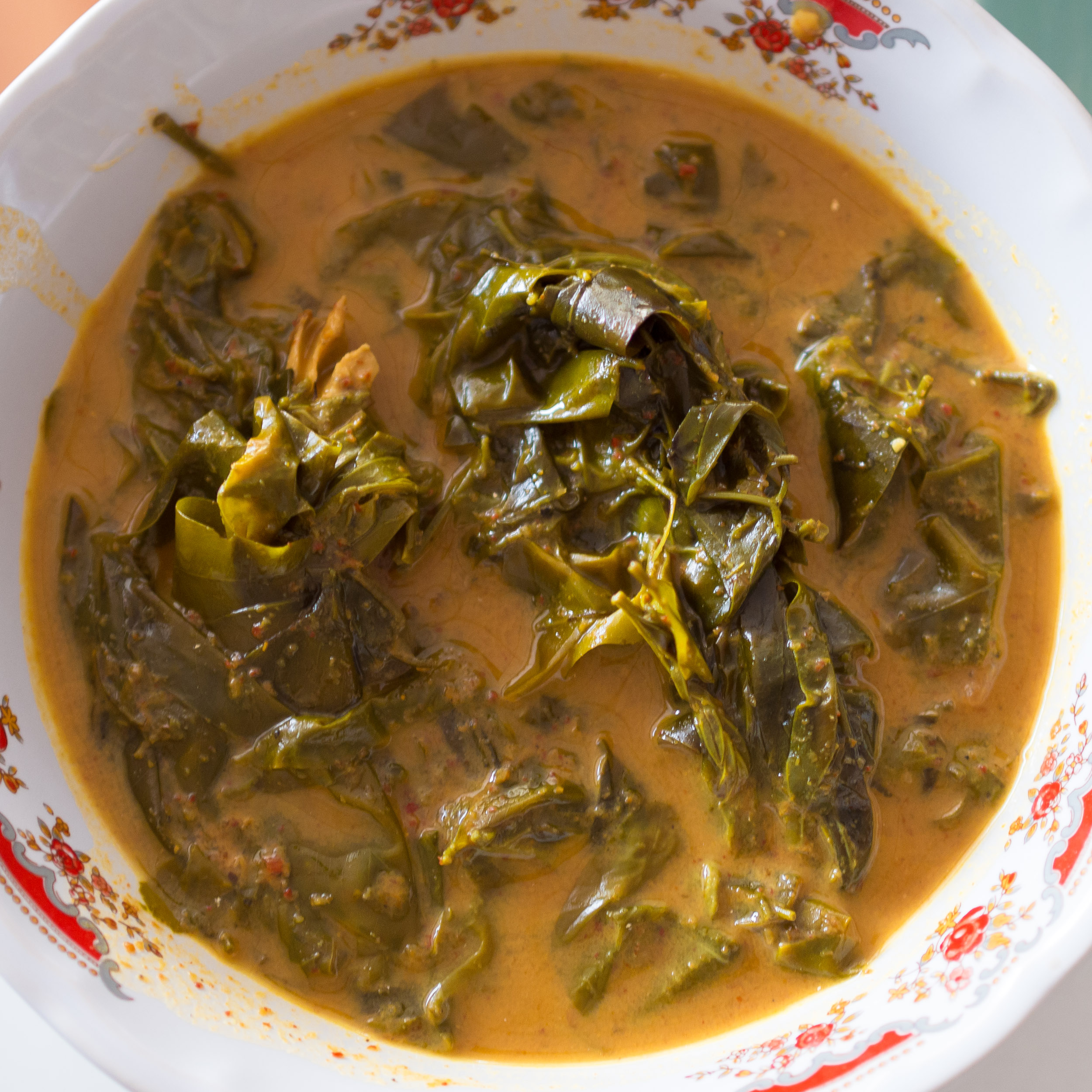
Kaeng khilek, a Thai curry made with kassod leaves and flower buds

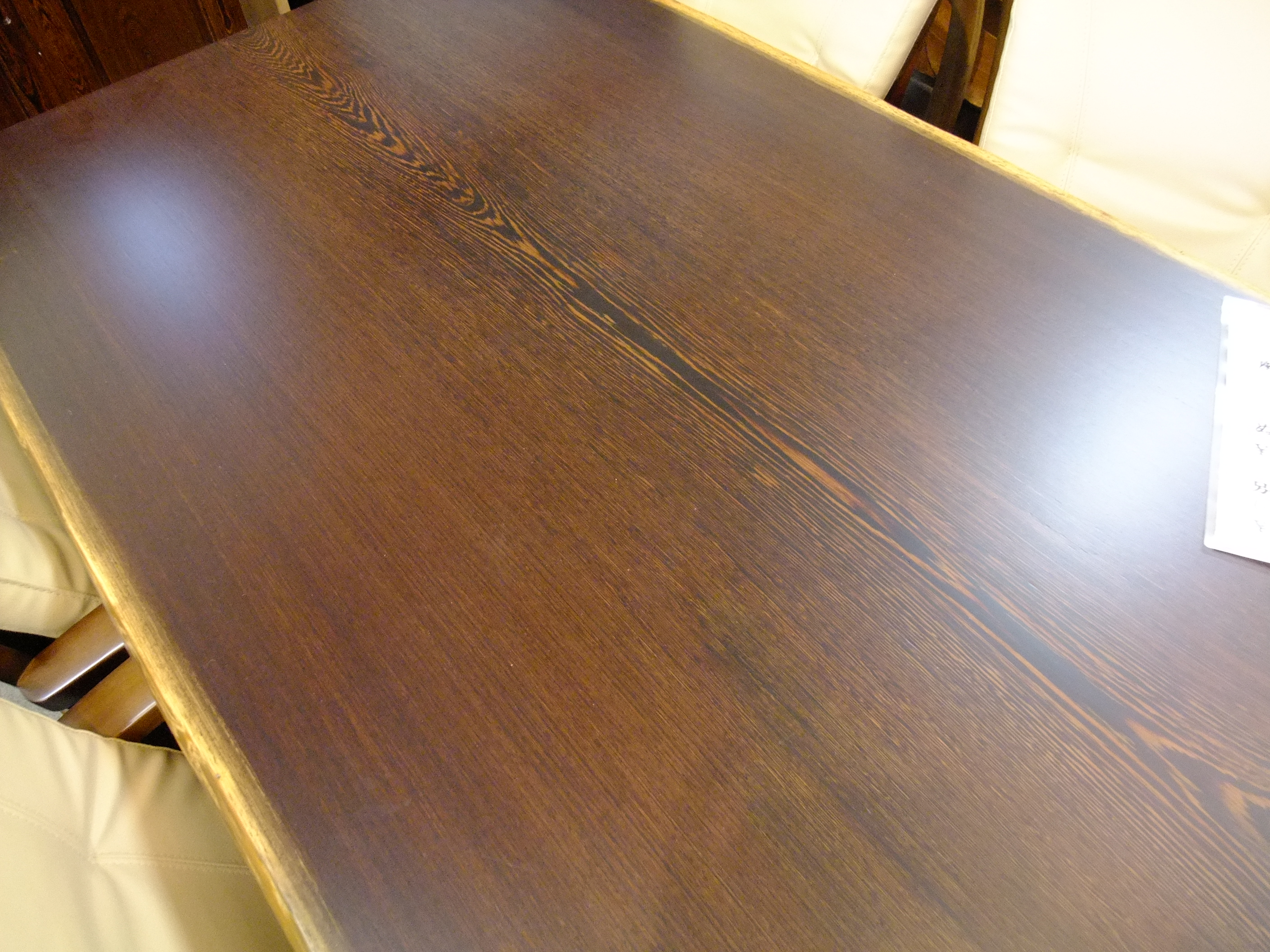
Wood from S. siamea (鉄刀木) is highly valued in Chinese furniture making.

This plant has medicinal value and it contains a compound named barakol. The leaves, tender pods and seeds are edible, but they must be previously boiled and the water discarded. They are used in Burmese and also in Thai cuisine where one of the most well-known preparations is kaeng khilek (Thai: แกงขี้เหล็ก).

In Burmese tradition, during the full moon day of Tazaungmon, Burmese families pick Siamese cassia buds and prepare it in a salad called mezali phu thoke (မယ်ဇလီဖူးသုပ်) or in a soup.

Other uses include as fodder plant, in intercropping systems, windbreaks, and shelter belts. As a hardwood, it is used for ornamentation on instruments (ukuleles and guitars) and decorative products. In this capacity it is known as pheasantwood or polohala, named for the similarity of the grain to pheasant feathers. It is sometimes used in Chinese furniture (known as jichimu) interchangeably with wood from the Ormosia species.

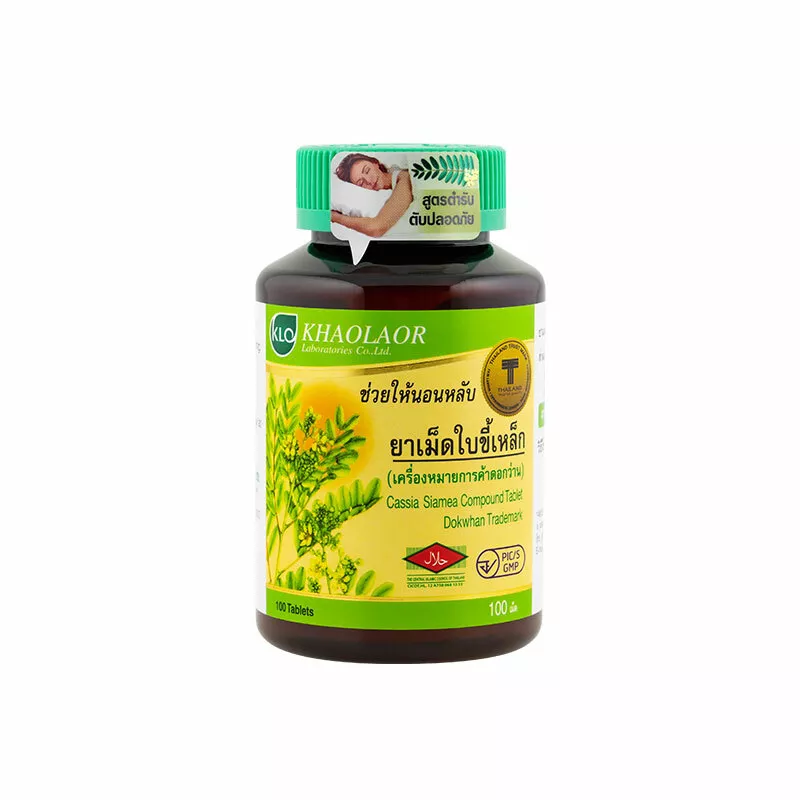
Senna siamea tablets found in Bangkok

Scientific studies have established its medicinal potential, mainly on account of the anxiolytic properties of its main active chemical: barakol. It is sold in Asian pharmacies, mostly as a sleep aid, but also to treat constipation and as a hair balm.

== Vernacular names ==
- Burmese: မယ်ဇလီ, mezali
- Thai: ขี้เหล็ก, khilek
- Vietnamese: muồng đen
- Lao: ຕົ້ນຂີ້ເຫຼັກ, ton khi heak
- Twi: Nkyedua
- Ewe: Zangara gbe
- Kiswahili : mhoba
- Assamese: Xunaroo
- Japanese: 鉄刀木, tagayasan

== See also ==
- Millettia laurentii
- Millettia leucantha
- Ormosia
