= Barakol =

Chemical compound

Clinical data
- ATC code: none

Identifiers
- IUPAC name: 2,5-Dimethyl-3aH-pyrano[2,3,4-de]-1-benzopyran-3a,8-diol
- CAS Number: 24506-68-1
- PubChem CID: 3080731
- ChemSpider: 2338470
- UNII: EZC4ABS2MU
- CompTox Dashboard (EPA): DTXSID30947398

Chemical and physical data
- Formula: C_{13}H_{12}O_{4}
- Molar mass: 232.235 g·mol^{−1}
- 3D model (JSmol): Interactive image
- SMILES: CC2=Cc3cc(O)cc(c13)OC(C)=CC1(O)O2
- InChI: InChI=1S/C13H12O4/c1-7-3-9-4-10(14)5-11-12(9)13(15,17-7)6-8(2)16-11/h3-6,14-15H,1-2H3; Key:LVPNMZHEDIKUFK-UHFFFAOYSA-N

Barakol is a compound found in the plant Senna siamea, which is used in traditional herbal medicine. It has sedative and anxiolytic effects. There are contradictory pharmacological research findings concerning the toxicity of Senna siamea and the active ingredient barakol. One pharmacological study has shown an hepatoxic effect of barakol, while another study did not show any toxic effect at a daily dosage intake. Further research is needed to verify whether there are toxic effects of barakol or not.
