= Pon ye gyi =

Burmese fermented bean paste

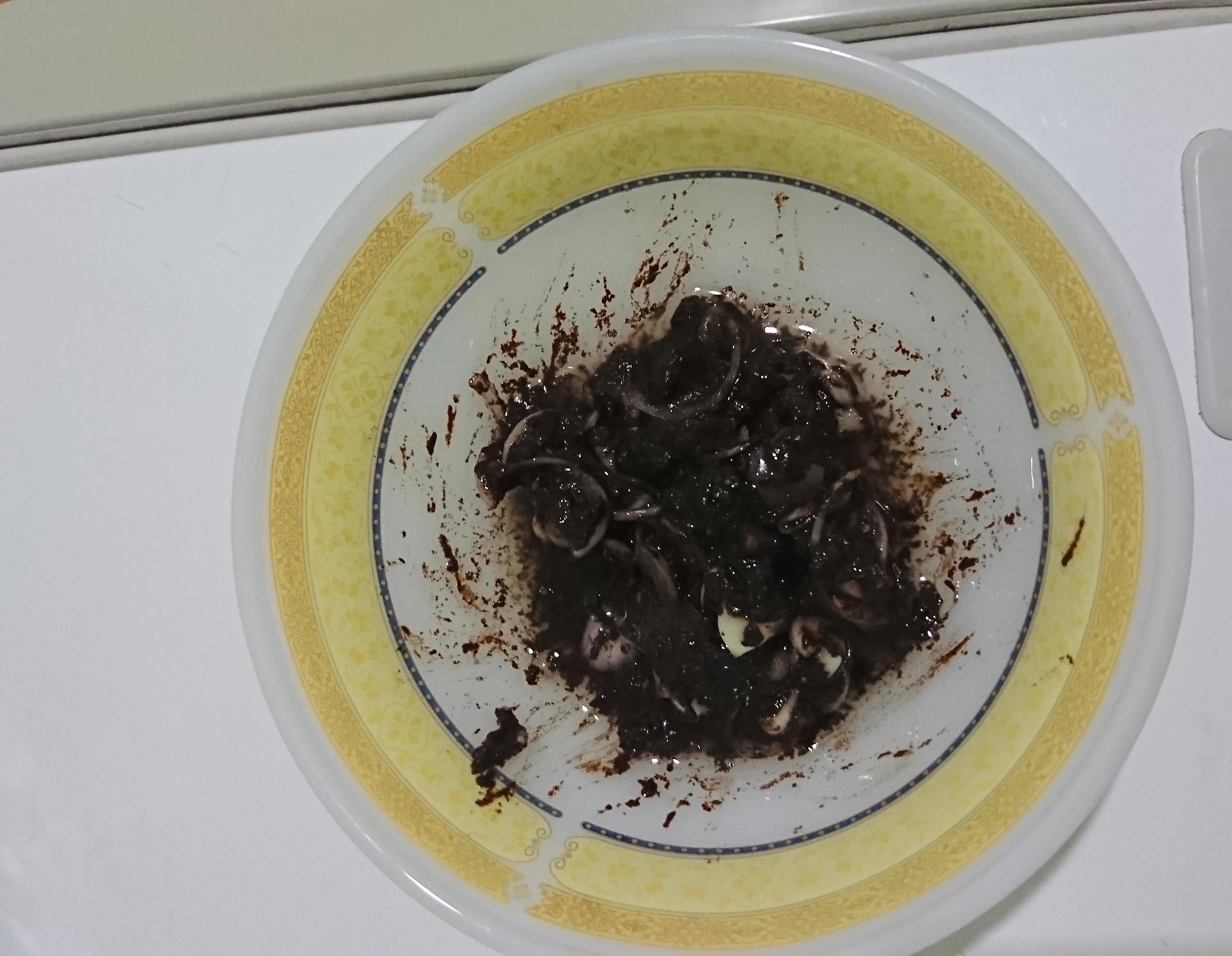
- Pon ye gyi
- Alternative names: pone yay gyi, pone ye gyi
- Type: Fermented bean paste
- Place of origin: Myanmar (Burma)
- Associated cuisine: Burmese cuisine
- Main ingredients: Macrotyloma uniflorum and other beans

Pon ye gyi (Burmese: ပုန်းရည်ကြီး, Burmese pronunciation: [póʊɴjèd͡ʑí]; also spelt pone yay gyi and pone ye gyi) is a fermented bean paste commonly used as a condiment or marinade in Burmese cuisine, especially in pork and fish dishes. Pon ye gyi is traditionally made from horse gram beans, alongside other beans.

Some sites are incorrect in saying that the cooked seeds are pounded with salt and fermented for about 12 hours into a product similar to soya bean sauce producing a viscous paste with a reddish brown colour.

To produce the paste, the horse gram seeds are rinsed and boiled. The water from boiling the seeds are saved and reduced over several hours, until a thick consistency is formed. The cooked seeds are removed and saved for use as animal feed. It seems that during the reduction stage salt is added (confirmation required). Once satisfactory thickness is achieved, the paste is removed from heat, cooled and dried for some time - possibly 12 hours. Sufficiently dried paste is then packaged.

It is consumed as a side-dish all over Myanmar. The towns of Bagan, Nyaung U and Sale, and Myingyan in the country's central Dry Zone are major producers of this product.

== See also ==
- Fermented bean paste
