= Chechen cuisine =

Culinary traditions of Chechnya

Chechen cuisine (Chechen: Нохчийн даар; Noxçiyn daar) encompasses the traditional cooking styles and dishes of the Chechen people of Chechnya (North Caucasus) and the Chechen diaspora. The mountainous geography of the region, as well as its history of warfare have had their influence on the traditional culinary practices of the Chechen people, as has a strong culture of hospitality.

The bases of Chechen cuisine are meat, leeks, cheese, pumpkin and corn. The main components of Chechen dishes include seasonings such as onion, wild garlic, pepper and thyme.

Chechen cuisine is known for having rich dishes, and is also typically simple to prepare and easily digestible. Many foods are boiled on an open stove, with boiled or steamed dumplings, called galnash, being a staple of Chechen cuisine.

== Dishes ==
=== Main dishes ===
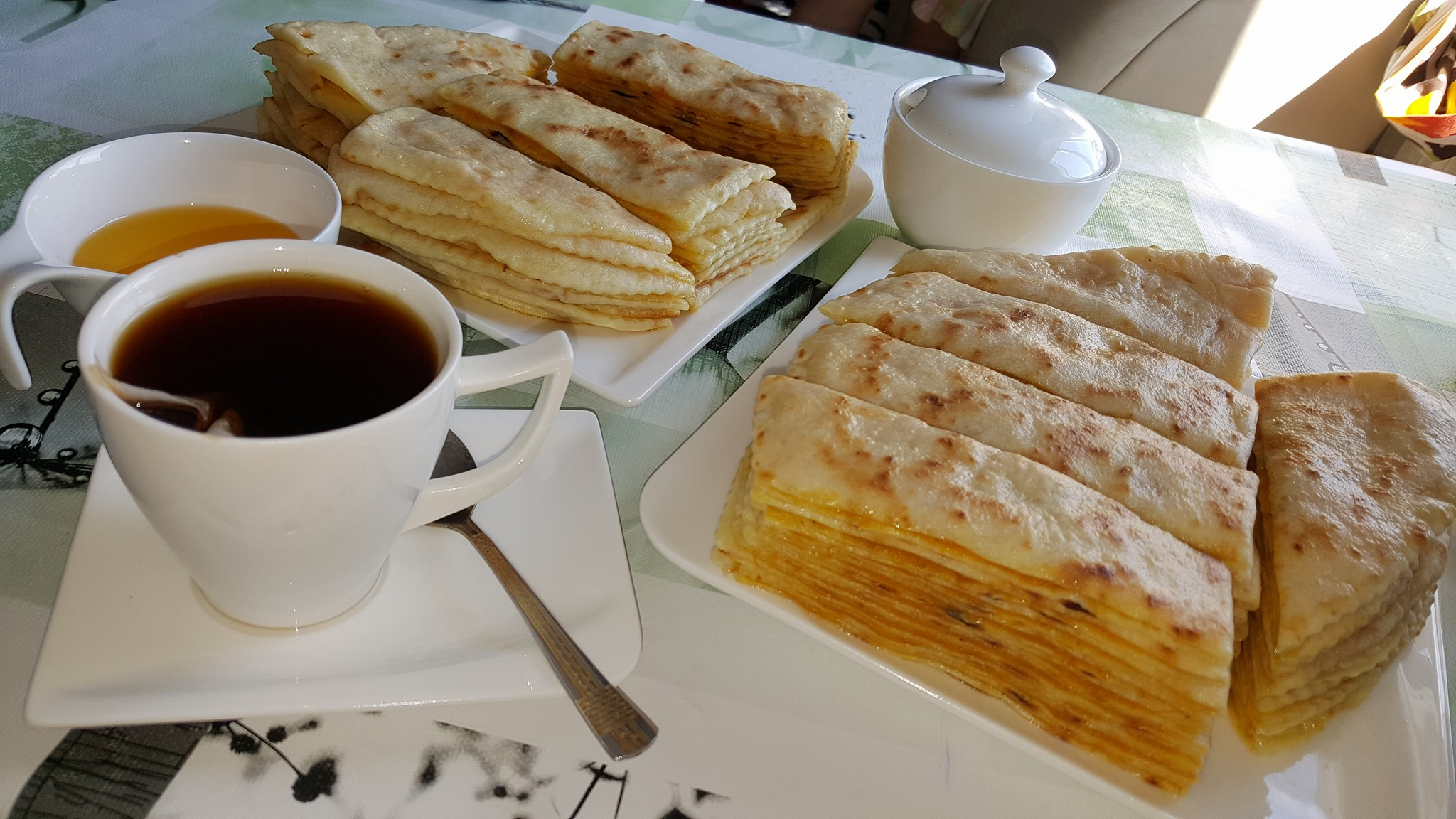
Hingalsh

- Barsh (БӀарш; Bjarş) - Mutton stomach stuffed with ground meat, similar to haggis.
- Chepalgash (ЧIепалгаш; Ç̇epalgaş) - Type of pie filled with cottage cheese and wild garlic.
- Dalnash (Далнаш; Dalnaş) - Chudu (pie) filled with lard and wild garlic.
- Daqina-Jijig (Дакъина-Жижиг; Daq̇ina-Ƶiƶig) - Smoked meat
- Khingalsh (Хингалш; Xingalş) - Sort of half-round pie filled with pumpkin or sweet potato and butter or clarified butter . It is one of the most popular dishes of the Chechen cuisine.
- Kholtmash (ХьолтӀмаш; Ẋolthmaş) - Dumplings made from corn flour and filled with nettle.
- Jijig-Chorpa (Жижиг-Чорпа; Ƶiƶig-Çorpa) - Soup made of mutton or beef, tomatoes, potatoes, etc.
- Zhizhig-Galnash (Жижиг-Галнаш; Ƶiƶig-Galnaş) - Galnash (Pasta-like boiled dough) with meat (mostly mutton, chicken and beef).
- Kiald-Davtta (Киалд-Давтта) - Cottage cheese with butter.
- Kkherzan-Dulkh (Кхерзан-Дулх; Kxerzan-Dulx) - Fried meat (mutton or beef) with vegetables.
- Khudar (Худар; Xudar) - Porridge with cheese.
- Khychin (Кычин; Kiçin) - Traditional flatbread eaten throughout the Caucasus region.
- Kurzanesh - Steamed or boiled dumplings filled with minced lamb and eaten alone or with garlic and yoghurt sauce.
- Shashlik (Шашлык; Şaşlik) - Traditional kebab from the Caucasus region; they are consumed throughout Chechnya.
- Siskal (Сискал) - Fried cornbread.
- To-Beram (ТIо-берам; Tho-beram) - Sauce made of sour cream and cottage cheese. Often accompanied with Chechen cornbread.
- Yokh (Йоьхь; Yöẋ) - Sausage made of wheat flour, mutton (minced), chicken fat and garlic.

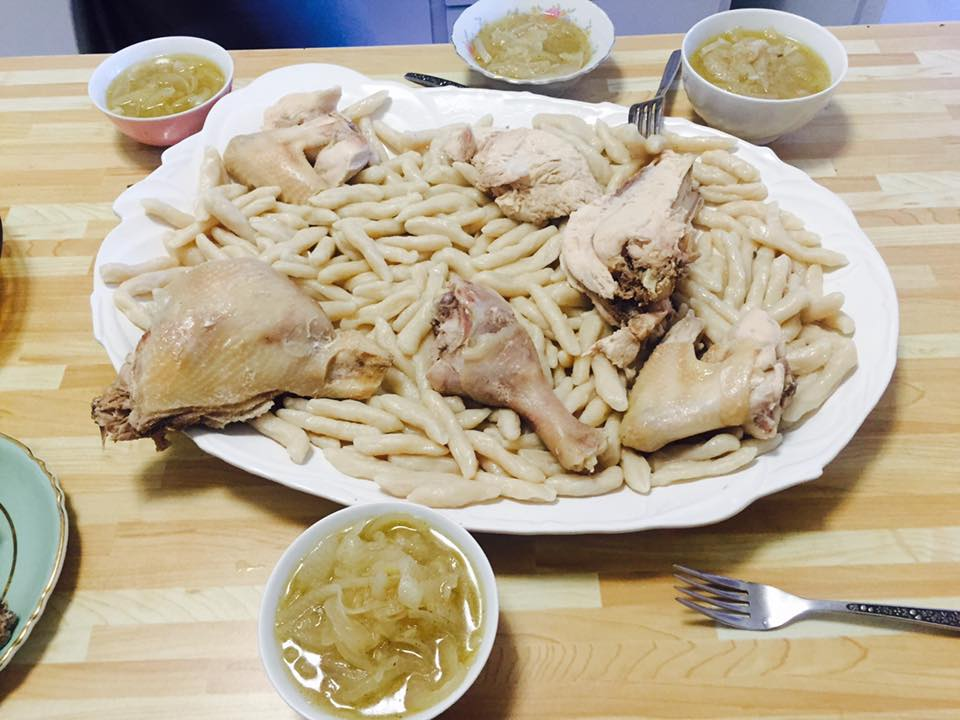
Jijig-galnash

=== Desserts ===
- Akhar Khovla (Ахьар Хьовла; Aẋar Ẋovla) - Helva made from corn flour.
- Dema Khovla (Дема Хьовла; Dema Ẋovla) - Helva made from wheat flour.
- Garzni Khovla (Гарзни Хьовла; Garzni Ẋovla) - Helva made from wheat flour in form of noodles.
- Gvaymakkhsh (Гваймакхш; Gvaymakxş) - Sort of pancakes with honey.
- Vieta (Виета) is a Chechen national dish of flax seeds with a thick liquid mass of dark brown color obtained from chopped fried or simply dried flax seeds by grinding in millstones. It is used in the traditional cuisine of Chechens, like a nutritious sweet dish, mixing with sugar or honey and oil. Any can be added oil: vegetable or cream melted. Vieta - "Linum" has long been common among Chechens; an exquisite dish is prepared from its ground seeds - linum pasta - by frying linseed flour in boiling oil with sugar or honey. Chechens prepare a dish only from seeds linum (flax).

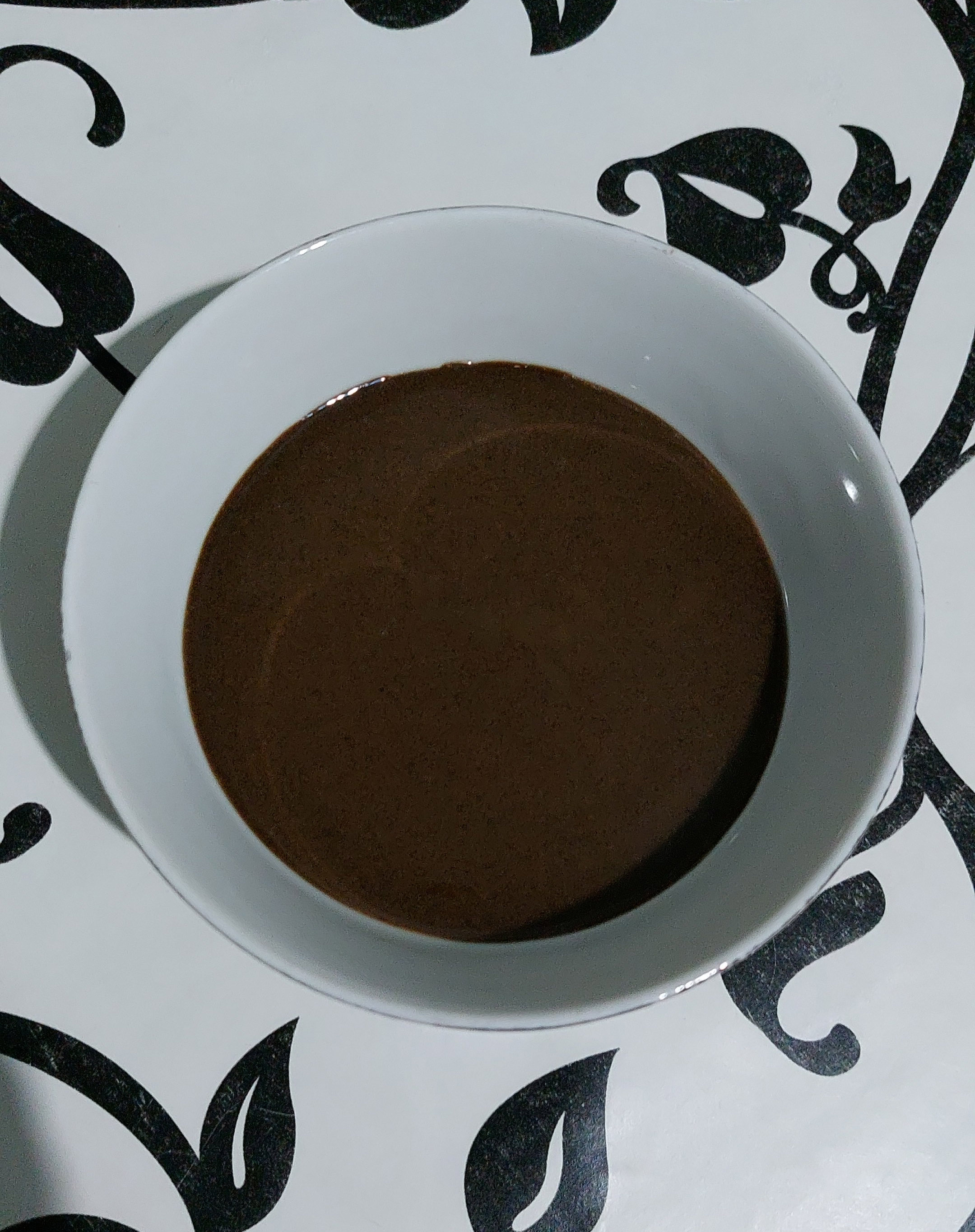
Vieta (Vieta)

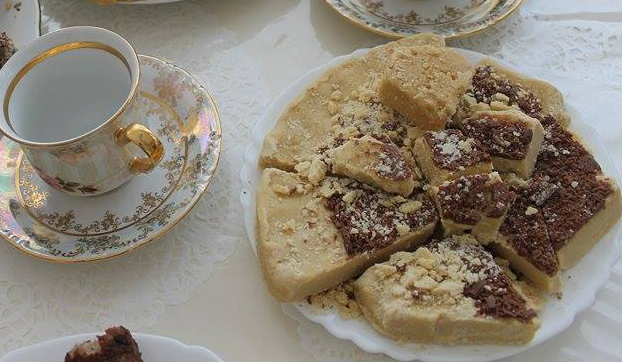
Dema Khovla

=== Beverages ===
- Churychay - A bowl of hot tea and milk with salt, pepper, and butter added in place of sugar. This is enjoyed by dipping bread in the tea and drinking the remains.

== See also ==
- Chechen culture
- Russian cuisine
- Soviet cuisine
