= Ashoka Halwa =

Confectionery from Tamil Nadu, India

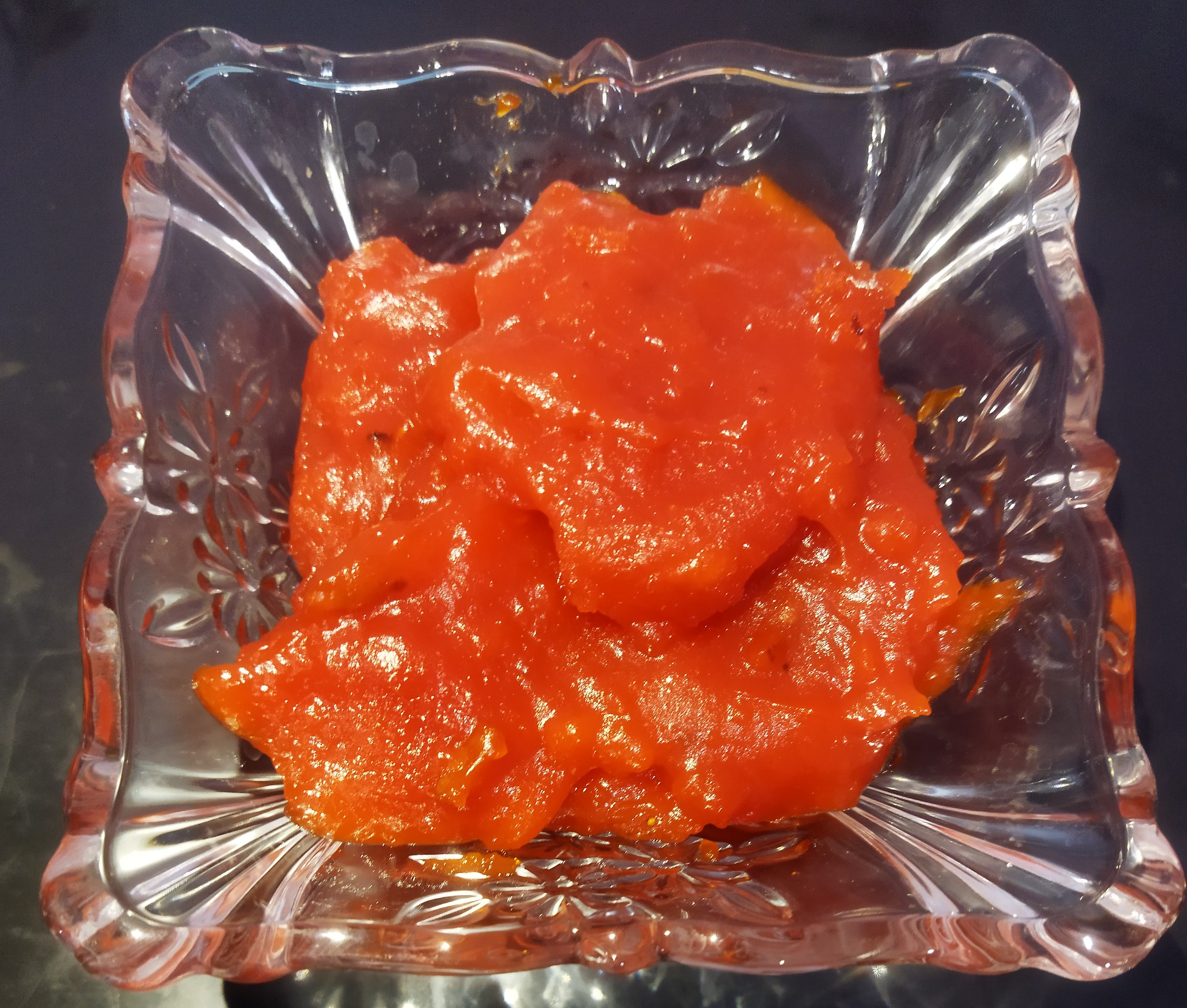
Ashoka Halwa

Ashoka Halwa or Pasi Paruppu Halwa is a thick gooey sweet from Thiruvaiyaru, Thanjavur, Tamil Nadu, India. Ashoka Halwa consists of Moong Dal, ghee, sugar and water, flavored with cardamom and cashews or almonds. It is known for it thick texture and rich red, yellow and orange colour.

Ashoka Halwa is eaten during Tamil festivals and Indian festivals such as Deepavali, Pongal, Tamil New Year and during Tamil weddings

== History ==
Ashoka Halwa is believed to be developed by P. Ramaiyer in the 1930s at his tea stall called Aandavar Tea Stall in Thiruvaiyaru, Tamil Nadu. Ramaiyer had made the halwa around World War II when wheat had become scarce. Since there was a shortage of wheat he turned to moong dal, a healthier and easily made lentil to make the dish.

The dish was called Ashoka Halwa by Ramaiyer as he believed it was the king of halwas, using the name Ashoka from the Indian emperor Ashoka.

== Ingredients ==
The halwa consists of moong dal, ghee, sugar and wheat flour as the basic dish. khoya, cardamom, and cashews are sometimes added.

To get the correct texture and taste, the store that founded the halwa 'Aandavar Halwa Kadai' usually cooks the dish on a clay oven (fire stove) using casuarina wood to fire the oven. The store uses locally sourced water from the Kaveri river to enhance the flavour.

== Serving ==
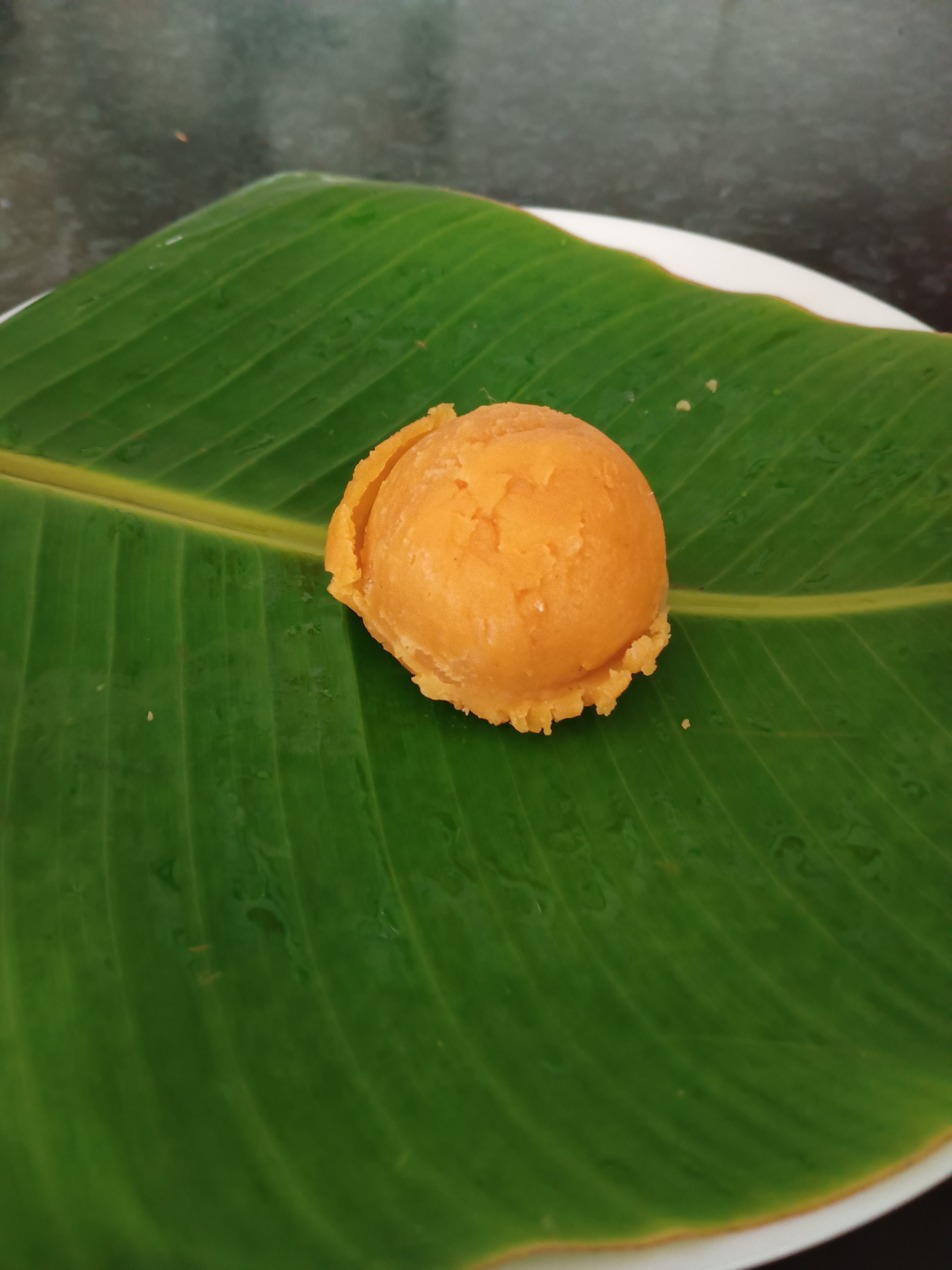
A scoop of Ashoka Halwa on a banana leaf

The halwa is usually served warm with generous amounts of ghee and toppled off with nuts such as cashews or almonds. Traditionally in Tamil Brahmin weddings and feasts, the sweet is normally served on a fresh banana leaf. Some may like it to be served paired with spicy mixture or any other savories. It can also be served with an authentic filter coffee or tea.

== See also ==
- Halwa
- Moong dal halwa
- Karachi Halwa
- Indian Sweets
