= Vieta (dish) =

Food produced from flax

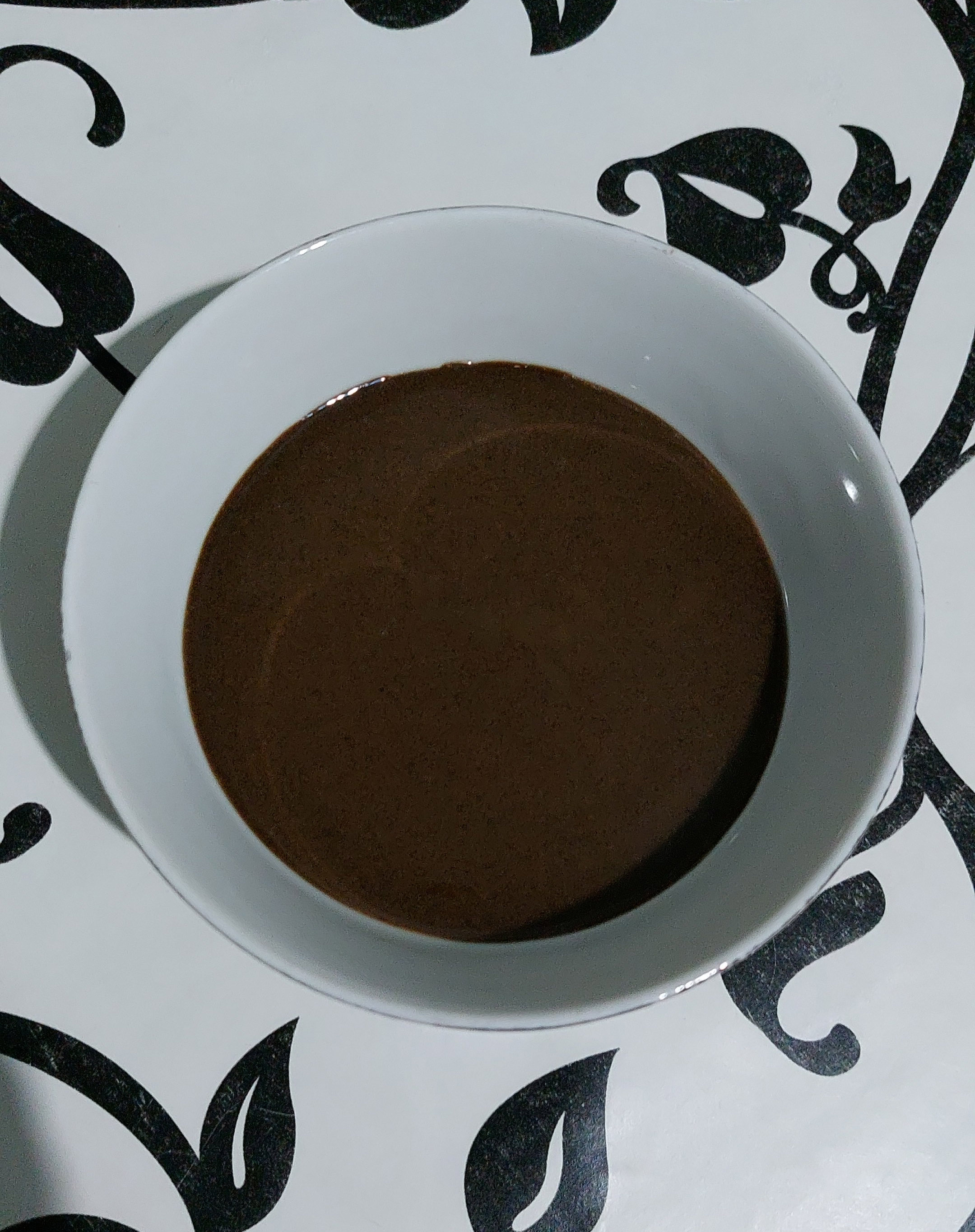
- Thick liquid paste
- Region or state: Chechnya
- Main ingredients: ghee, sugar or honey

Vieta (Chechen: Воьта) is a Chechen national dish of flax seeds. A thick liquid paste-like mass obtained from roasted or simply dried flax seeds, ground in a mill. It has long been used by Chechens as a nutritional tonic, as well as in the treatment of various diseases. Vieta has long been common among Chechens. An exquisite dish was prepared from ground flax seeds — flax halva — by frying flax flour in boiling oil with sugar or honey. This dish was especially appreciated by the Chechens. Chechens cook the dish only with flax seeds. Before the Caucasian War, Chechens, in addition to dishes, also made linen from flax.

Chechen local historian, teacher and folk poet A. S. Suleymanov, in his book "Toponymy of Chechnya", reports that in the village of Boni-Yurt, Aukhovsky district, there was a mill where they ground flax, from which they made a dish.

Since the beginning of the 1990s, due to regular TV commercials praising chocolate bars, due to a number of similar parameters, the Vieta has received a playful name — "Chechen Snickers".

== Name ==
The dish got its name from "vieta" (or "veta"), which the Chechens also call flax.

== Cooking ==
To prepare vieta, knead it in boiling ghee, adding sugar or honey to taste or 250 gr. oil, 6 large spoons of vieta, 6 large spoons of honey, or sugar to taste.

Due to the astringent taste properties, it would be more correct to consider the mass in its original state as a semi-finished product, and therefore, for the sake of easier digestibility at the cooking stages, thick sugar syrup or honey is added to the crushed oatmeal. In the process of preparation, the resulting paste-like mass is thoroughly mixed. Often butter or vegetable oil is added.

== Bibliography ==
- Suleimanov A. S. Toponymy of Chechnya / Ed. T. I. Buraeva. — Grozny: State Unitary Enterprise «Book Publishing House», 2006. — 711 p. — 5000 copies. — ISBN 5-98896-002-2
- Khazbulatov B. A. Phytonyms in the Chechen language: Synchronous-diachronic analysis. — M., 2004. — P. 16. — 100 copies.
- Osmaev M. K. Chechens: customs, traditions, rituals. Monograph. — Gr.: ChGU, 2015. — 181 p. — ISBN 978-5-91127-158-9
- Edilov S. E. Names of food in the Chechen language. Monograph. — Gr. : ChGU, 2015. — P. 39. — ISBN 978-5-91127-176-3
