= Khingalsh =

Chechen traditional pie

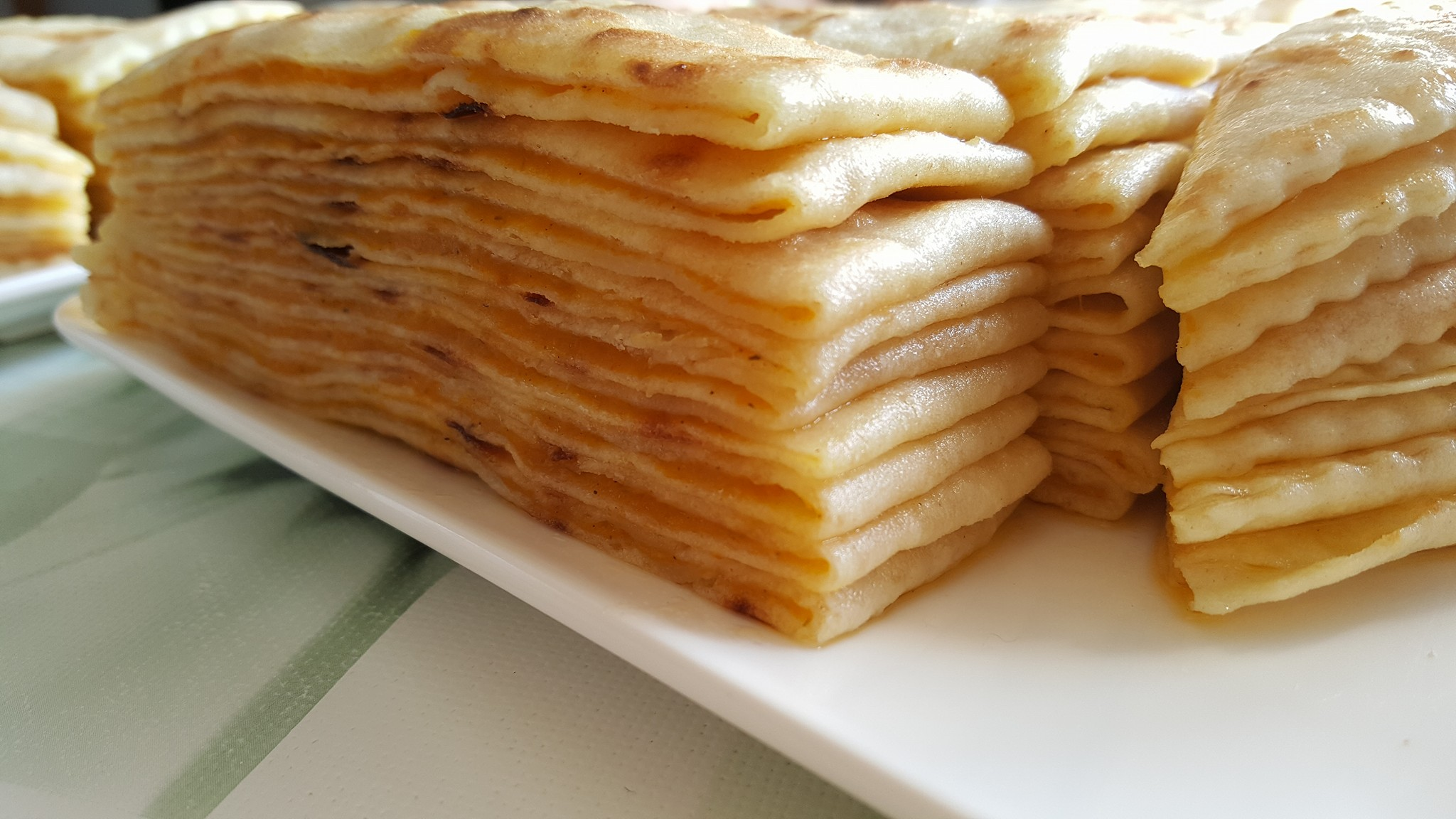
- Place of origin: Chechnya
- Region or state: North Caucasus
- Associated cuisine: Chechen cuisine
- Main ingredients: Pumpkin

Khingalsh (Хингалш) is a traditional Chechen pie filled with pumpkin or sweet potato and served with butter or clarified butter. The pies are typically cut into pieces before serving.

== Preparation ==
The process begins with cooking the pumpkin until it becomes soft, after which the flesh is scooped out and mashed with salt and sugar to achieve a smooth consistency.

The dough is made by mixing flour with slightly warmed kefir, salt, and baking soda, resulting in a soft and uniform texture. The pumpkin, after being cleaned of seeds, is cut into pieces and boiled with the skin facing up in hot water over low heat under a tightly closed lid. Once cooked, the soft flesh is scooped out.

The filling for Khingalsh can vary in flavor. A sweet version is made by simply adding sugar to pumpkin, while a savory variation includes fried onions, spices, and a touch of salt. The balance of sweetness from the pumpkin, spiciness from the onions, and the level of seasoning depend on the type of pumpkin used.

Traditionally, these filled pies are baked in an oven or cooked on a dry skillet. Once cooked, the pies are quickly dipped in hot water, brushed with melted butter, and stacked. Before serving, they are traditionally cut into portions, making them easy to share and enjoy.

== Gallery ==
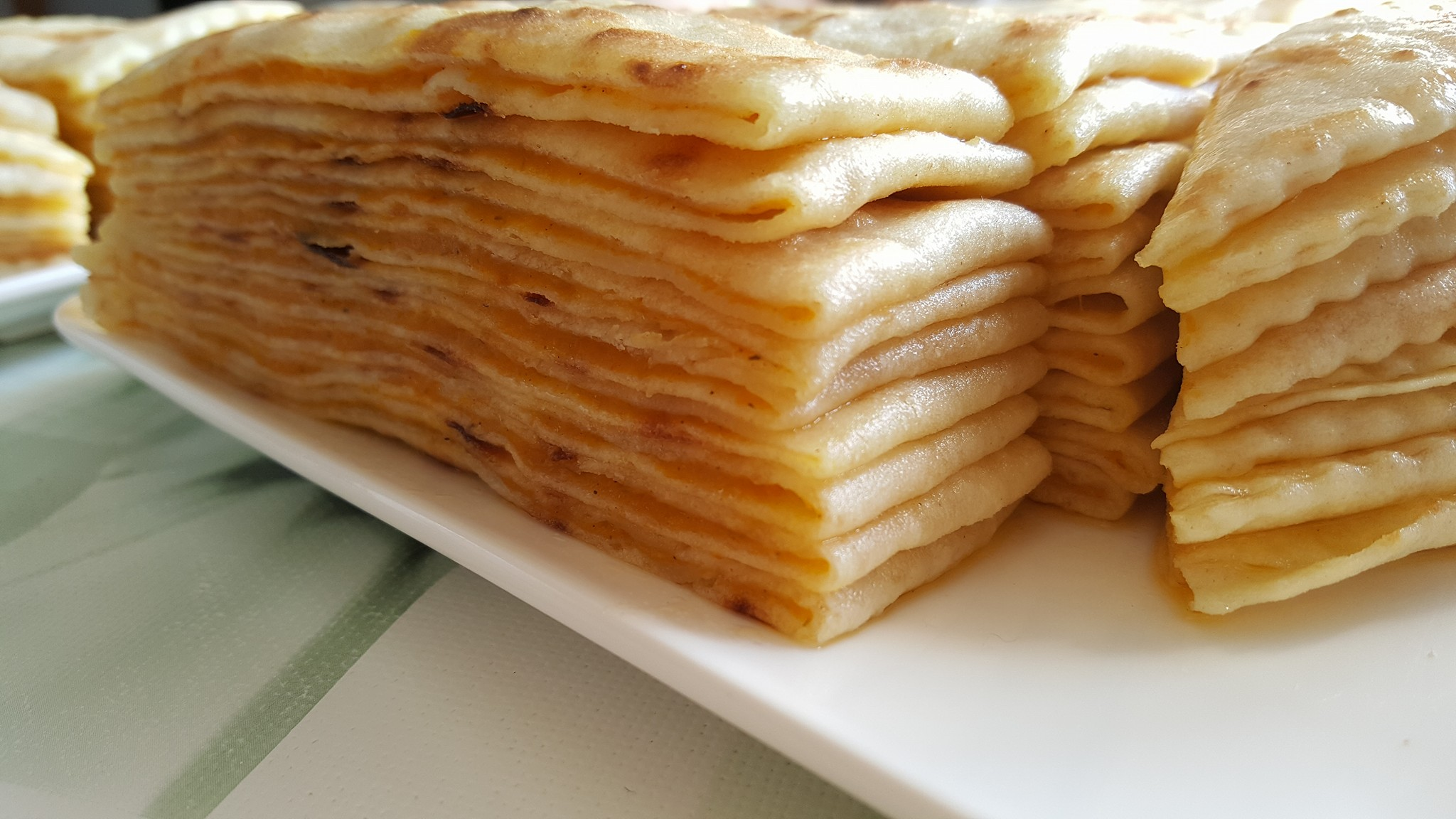

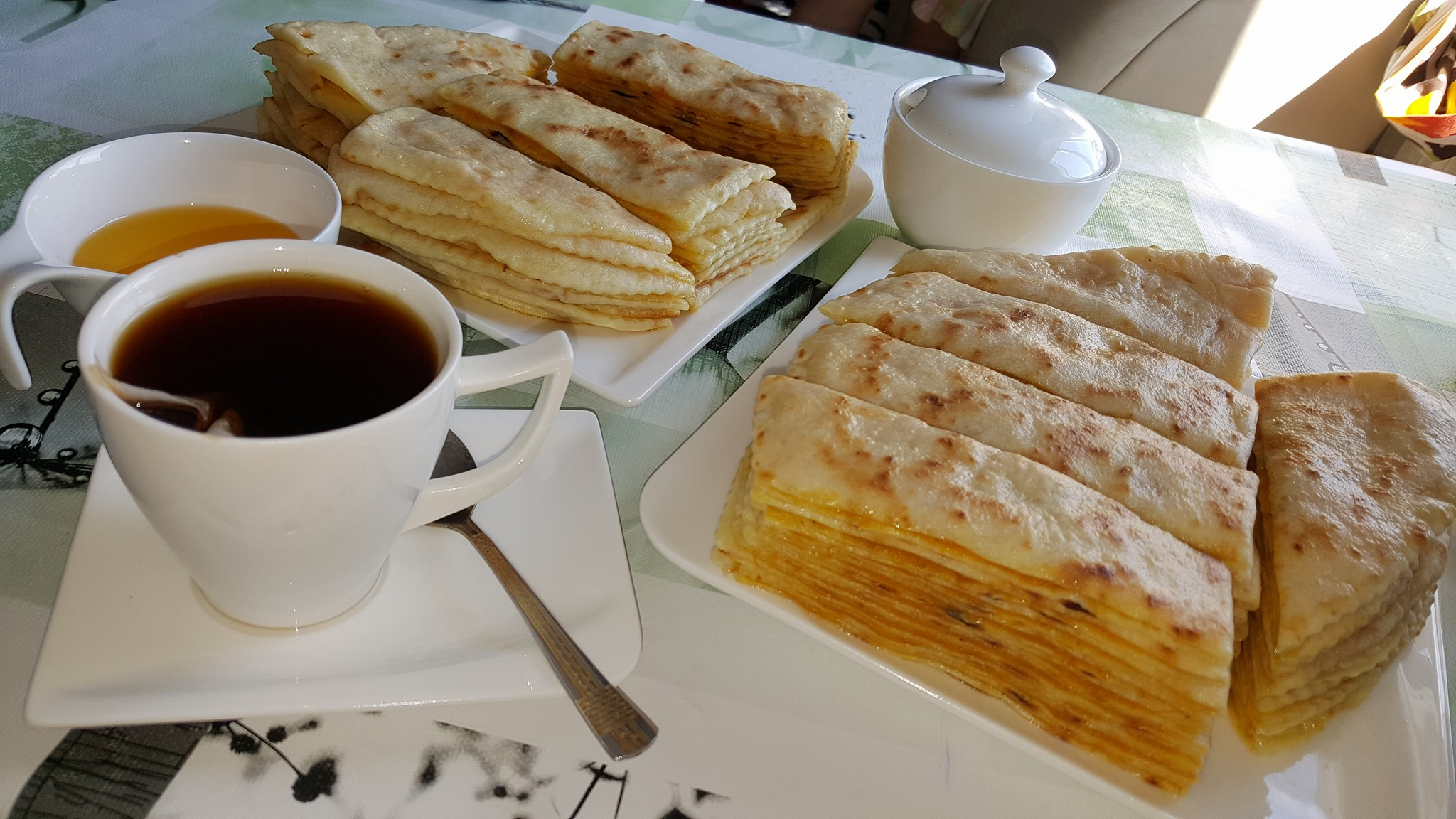
