= Moong dal halwa =

Indian sweet

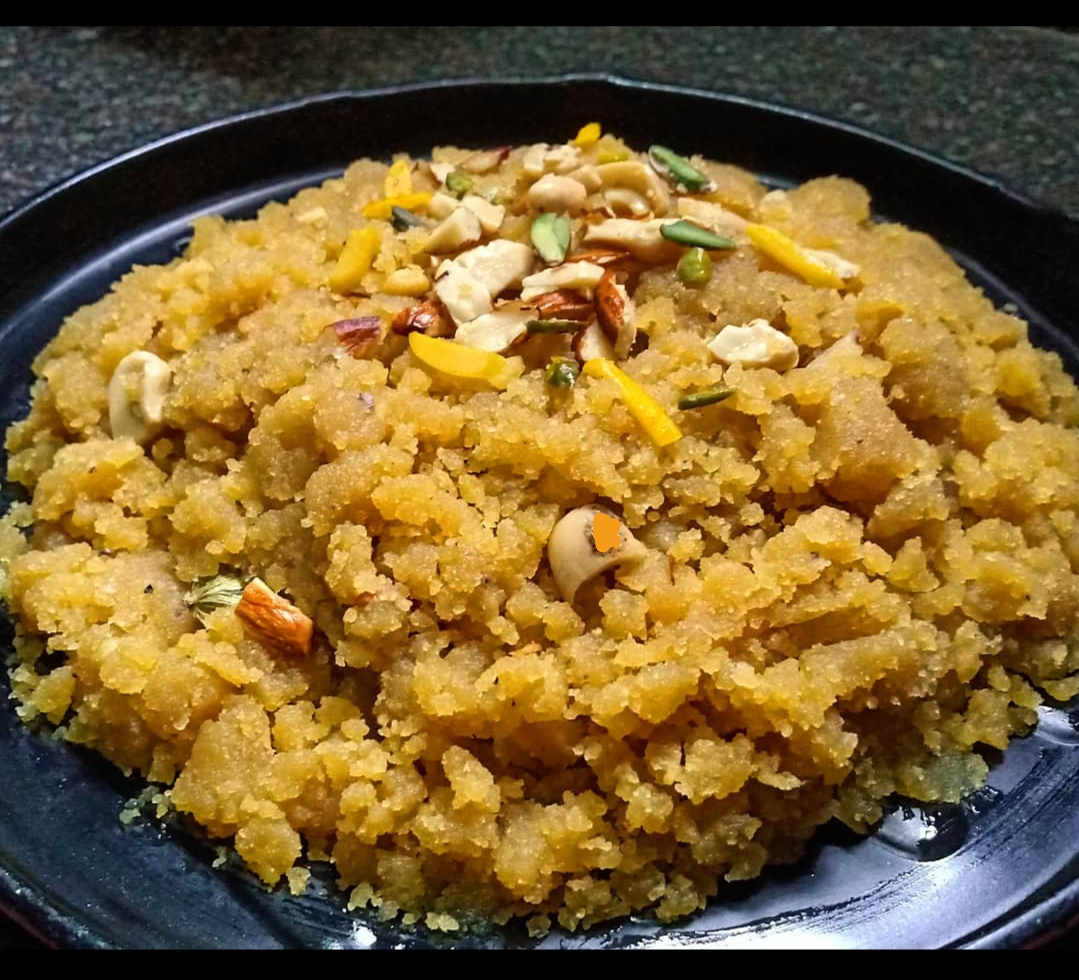
- Moong dal halwa garnished with dry fruits
- Course: Dessert
- Place of origin: India
- Region or state: Rajasthan
- Serving temperature: Hot or cold
- Main ingredients: Moong Dal, Ghee, Milk, Sugar, Cardamom Powder, Dry Fruits

Moong dal halwa is a traditional Indian dessert made from yellow moong dal (split mung beans), ghee, sugar, and milk or water and is garnished with dry fruits. Originating from the Rajasthan, it is particularly popular in the northern indian states. It is typically prepared during winter months and festive occasions such as Diwali, Holi, and weddings.

Group Captain Shubhanshu Shukla, an Indian Air Force pilot, carried moong dal halwa with him aboard the International Space Station as part of the Axiom Mission 4 (Ax‑4), making it one of the special Indian dishes he brought to orbit.

== Preparation ==
To prepare Moong Dal Halwa, yellow moong dal is soaked for a few hours and ground into a coarse paste. The paste is then slowly roasted in ghee until golden brown and aromatic. A hot mixture of sugar and milk or water is added, and the halwa is cooked until thick and smooth. Cardamom powder is added for flavor, and the dish is garnished with chopped dry fruits. The process is time-consuming and requires constant stirring to avoid burning.

== See also ==
- Halwa
- Pudding
- List of Indian sweets and dessert
- Ashoka Halwa
