= Pathein halawa =

Burmese rice desert

- Type: Dessert (mont)
- Place of origin: Myanmar (Burma)
- Region or state: Southeast Asia
- Associated cuisine: Burmese
- Invented: 1930s
- Main ingredients: glutinous rice flour, rice flour, coconut, sugar, poppy seeds, butter, milk
- Similar dishes: Mont kalame, Htoe mont, halva

Pathein halawa (Burmese: ပုသိမ်ဟလဝါ; pronounced [pəθèɪɴ ha̰ləwà]) is a traditional Burmese dessert or mont. The dessert is a pudding cooked using glutinous rice flour, rice flour, coconut, sugar, poppy seeds, butter, and milk, and has 2 primary variants: wet and dry. The dessert was first sold in Bassein (now Pathein), an Irrawaddy Delta town in the 1930s, and is now considered a delicacy of Pathein.

Pathein halawa is prepared in a similar manner as other Burmese desserts including mont kalama (မုန့်ကုလားမဲ) and htoe mont (ထိုးမုန့်).
