= Suji ka halwa =

Semolina halva

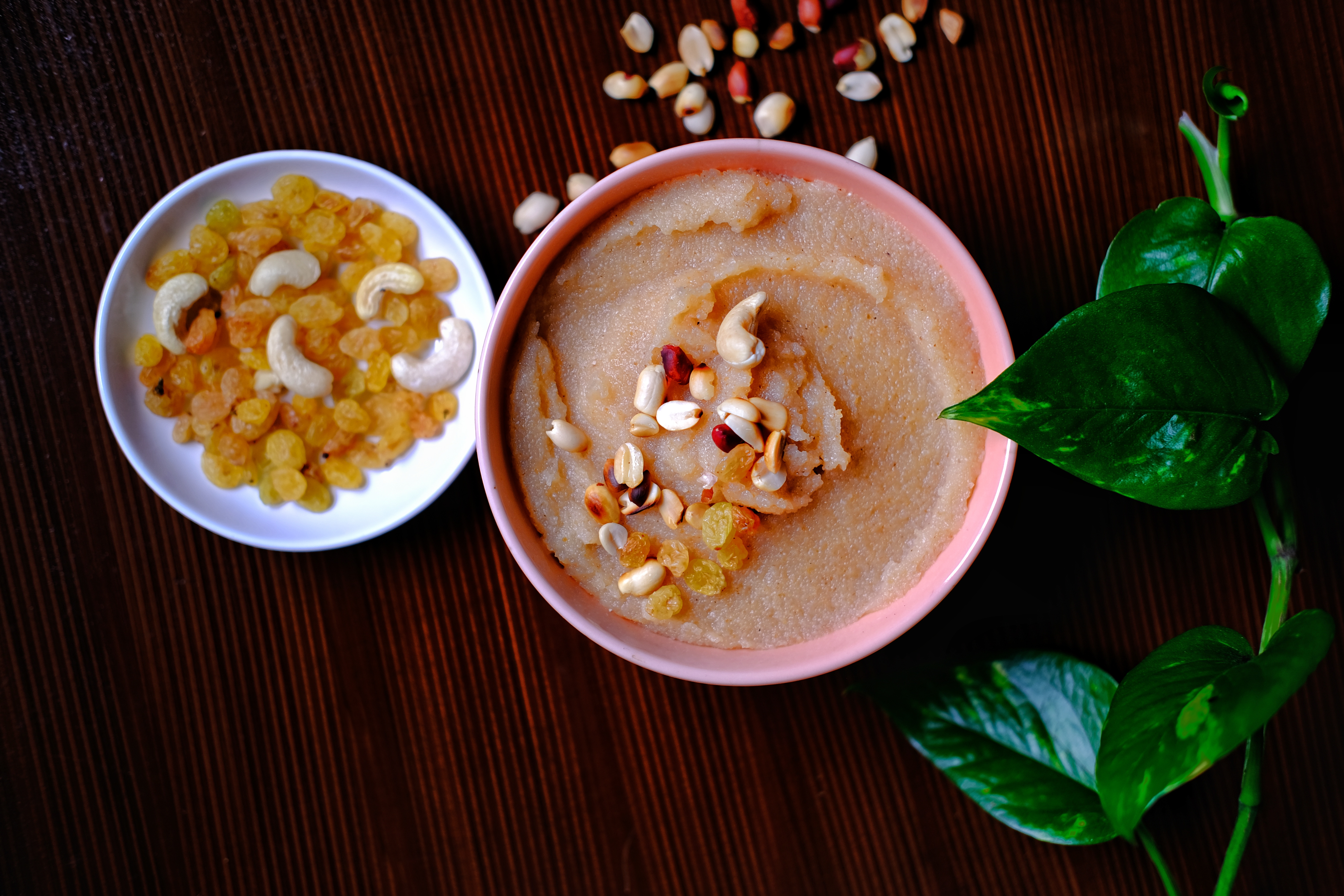
- Suji halwa to be eaten with roti and luchi, in Bangladesh
- Alternative names: Rawa sheera, sooji halwa, mohanbhog, parsad, kesari bat, rava kesari
- Type: Dessert
- Place of origin: India, Pakistan, Bangladesh
- Region or state: South Asia
- Main ingredients: Semolina, sweetener, fat (butter, ghee or oil), milk (optional), fruits and nuts (optional)
- Similar dishes: Sanwin makin

Suji ka halwa (Bengali: সুজির হালুয়া, Hindi: सूजी का हलवा, Marathi: रव्याचा शिरा, Urdu: سوجی کا حلوہ) or mohan bhog (Hindi: मोहन भोग, Sanskrit: मोहन भोग) is a type of halva in South Asian cuisine made by toasting semolina (called suji, sooji, or rawa) in a fat such as ghee or oil, and adding a sweetener like sugar syrup, honey, or jaggery powder. It can be served for breakfast or as a dessert. The basic recipe is made with just semolina, sugar or honey, ghee, and sometimes milk. Variations on this include dried or fresh fruits, nuts, shredded coconut, and other toppings. Wheat flour is often used as a substitute if semolina is not available, but virtually any starch can be used to make suji ka halwa.

== History ==
In Medieval Arabic cuisine, semolina halvah was made by roasting the milled wheat in butter and adding honey or sugar syrup to moisten the dessert. One recipe for hulwa a'jamiyya is made by boiling honey to create the syrup (diluted with water if needed) and garnished with pistachio and poppyseed. Milk can be added, as well as toppings like almonds, pistachios and pine nuts. Ibn Sayyar al-Warraq's 10th-century cookbook includes varieties made with carrots, apples and dates. Earlier, according to some scholars, this dish was introduced to India by the Mughals, but the theory was discredited as it was already listed as shali-anna, present-day kesari bat, in Manasollasa, a 12th-century work by a South Indian Chalukyan king, Someshvara III.

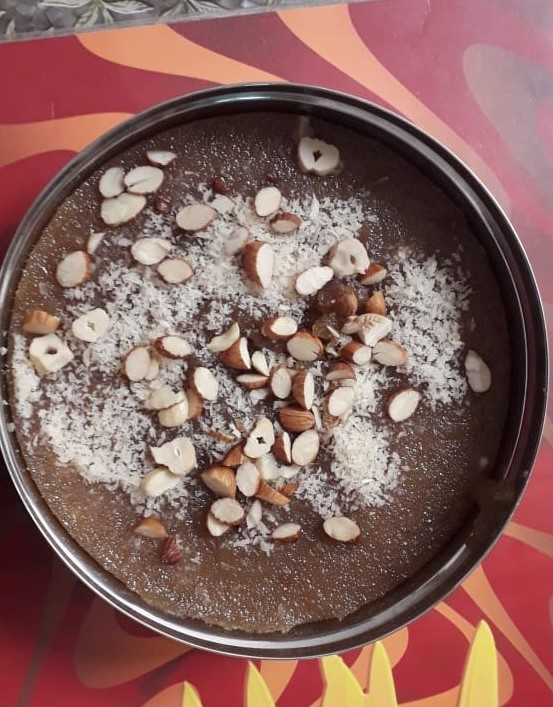
Suji ka halwa

== Terminology ==
In Marathi, the halwa made with semolina is called rawa sheera (रवा शीरा). When a similar halwa is prepared with wheat flour it's called gavhacya pithacha sheera (गव्हाच्या पीठाचा शीरा).

In Hindi, it is sooji ka halwa (सूजी का हलवा).

In Bangladesh and Indian state of West Bengal, it is known as Shujir Halua.

In South India, the dish is currently called Kesari Bat. It is called Sajjige in parts of Tulunadu.

In Telugu states Sooji ka halwa is made as a prasad on the occasion of fastings of Ekadashi and also made especially on the occasion of Satyanarayana Puja vratham to seek blessings from the lord.

In Myanmar (Burma), the dish is called sanwin makin.

In the Caribbean, it is known by Indo-Caribbeans as Mohan bhog or simply just as parsad, as it is a common sweet that Hindu Indo-Caribbeans charhaway or offer as prasad in pujas.

== Regional varieties ==
In India, suji ka halwa is made from semolina, ghee, and sugar; cardamom and milk, almonds and cashew nuts are added.
