= Joyva =

American confectionery manufacturer

Joyva Corporation
- Company type: Private company
- Industry: Confectionery/Chocolate
- Founded: 1907
- Founder: Nathan Radutzky
- Headquarters: Brooklyn, New York
- Key people: Richard Radutzky, president
- Products: Candy bars, Halva
- Website: Joyva Corp.

Joyva is a chocolate and confectionery manufacturer headquartered in Brooklyn, New York. "The house that sesame built" was started in 1907 by an immigrant from Kyiv, Ukraine, Nathan Radutzky, who wanted to start a company producing and selling sesame-based halvah. The company is still family-owned and continues to operate out of its Brooklyn location. Over the years, it has expanded its production to include a variety of sesame, marshmallow, and jelly-based candies. Joyva candy is kosher parve, and is most commonly found in kosher delis or stores in Jewish neighborhoods.

Joyva is operated by Richard Radutzky and Sandy Wiener, who are cousins and descendants of the founders. Radutzky graduated from Northwestern University in 1985, has been married to Leslye Sussman-Radutzky since 1988, and is a former actor. Richard Radutzky and his father, Milton, received special thanks in the credits of The Kids Are All Right.

== Products ==
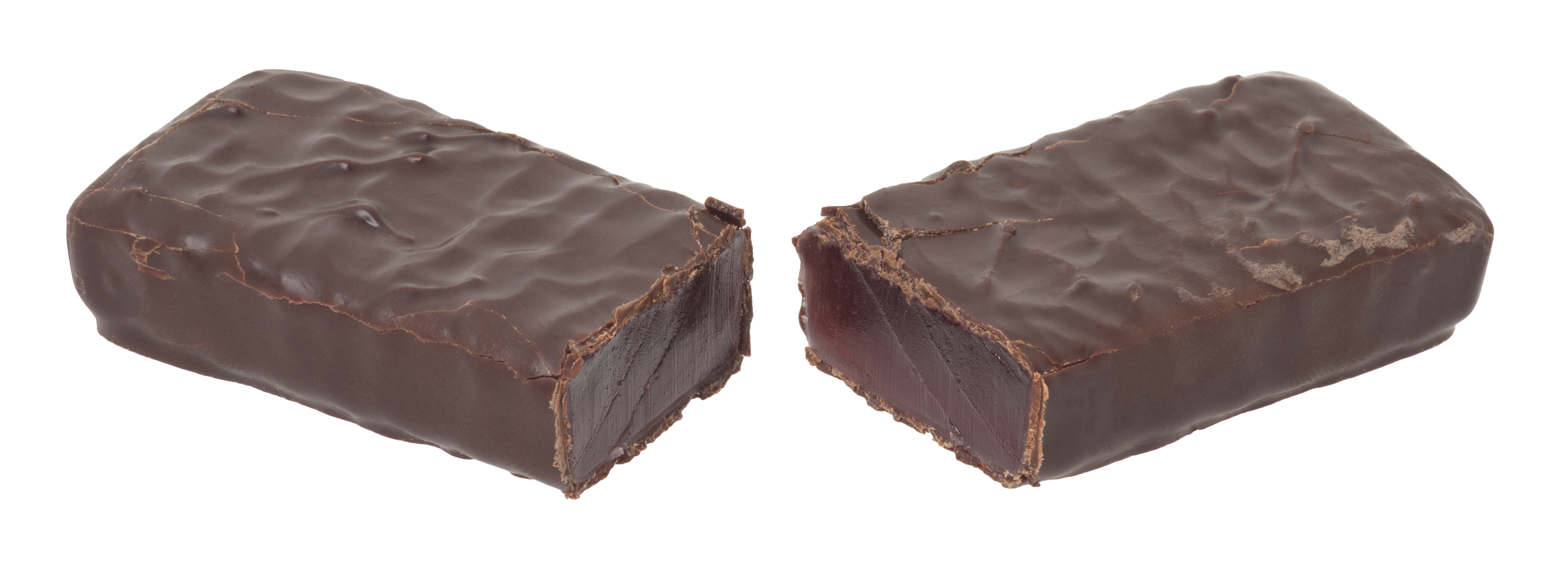
A Joyva Joy, chocolate-covered raspberry jelly

Joyva manufactures a variety of confections, but its flagship product is halvah. The company has a line of halvah products ranging from halvah bars, halvah in cans, and loaves of halvah with nuts. The halvah can be plain (vanilla), covered in chocolate or have chocolate mixed in (marble).

Products that are not halvah-based either incorporate jelly, marshmallow, or sesame. Their jelly-based candy is chocolate-covered, uses either raspberry or orange jelly, and is made into rings or bars. They also offer Sesame Crunch, a sesame seed candy, and various chocolate-covered marshmallow products, such as Marshmallow Twists.

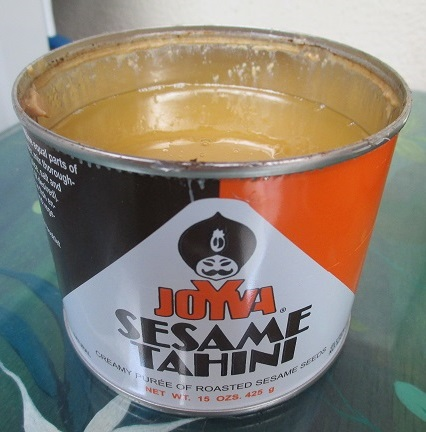
Joyva sesame tahini, 15 oz.

Joyva is the largest halvah producer in the United States.
