= Htoe mont =

Traditional Burmese dessert

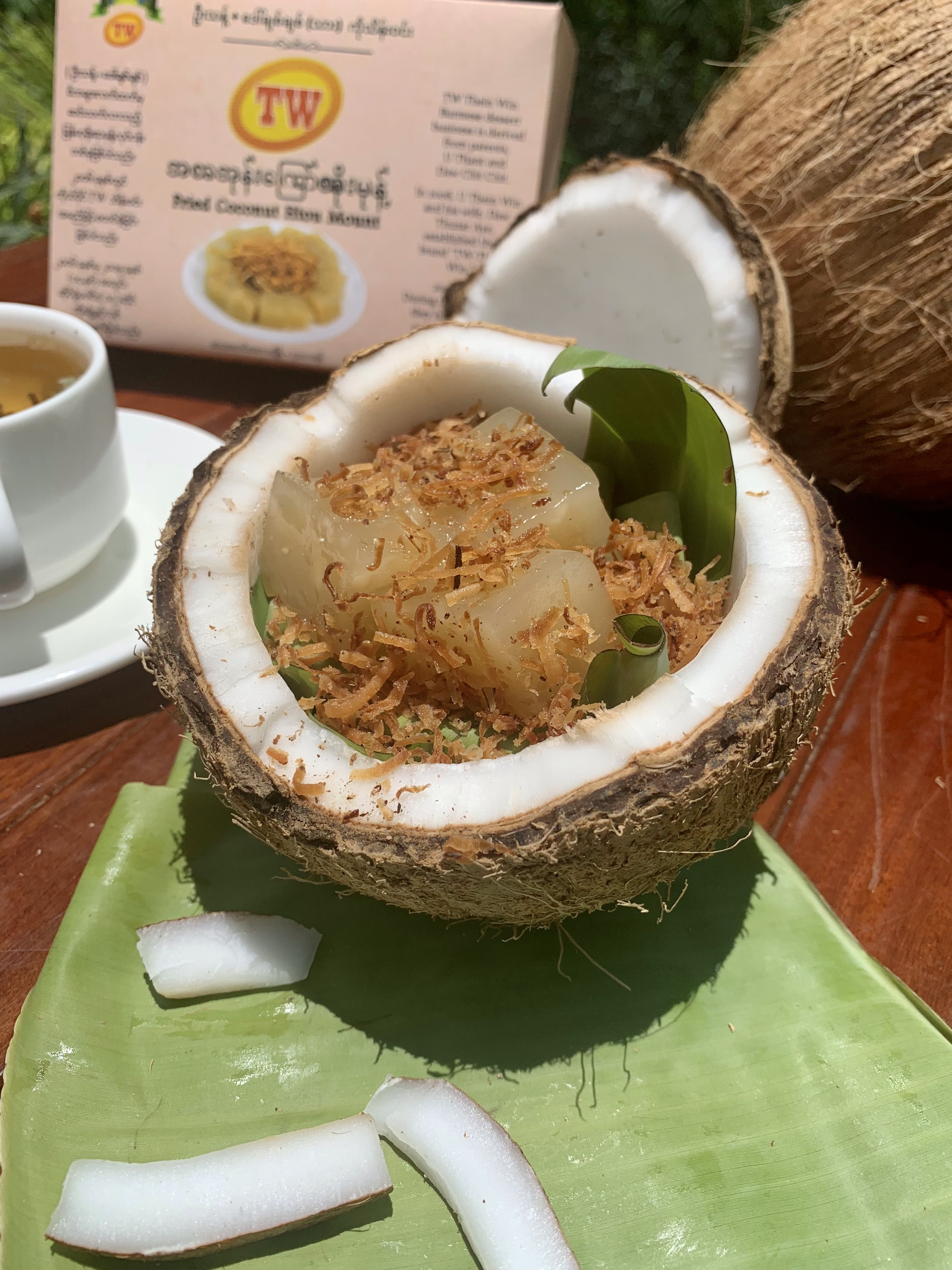
- Fried Coconut Htoe Mont
- Type: Dessert (mont)
- Place of origin: Myanmar (Burma)
- Region or state: Southeast Asia
- Associated cuisine: Burmese
- Main ingredients: rice flour, raisins, cashews, coconut shavings
- Similar dishes: Mont kalame, Pathein halawa

Htoe mont (Burmese: ထိုးမုန့်; pronounced [tʰómo̰ʊɴ]) is a traditional Burmese dessert or mont. The dessert is a glutinous rice cake cooked with raisins, cashews and coconut shavings, and is consistently prodded during the cooking process, lending it a texture similar to Turkish delight. Htoe mont is prepared in a similar manner, as other Burmese desserts, including mont kalame (မုန့်ကုလားမဲ) and Pathein halawa. Htoe mont is considered a delicacy of Mandalay, and is a popular souvenir from the city.
