= Zhizhig-galnash =

Chechen dish

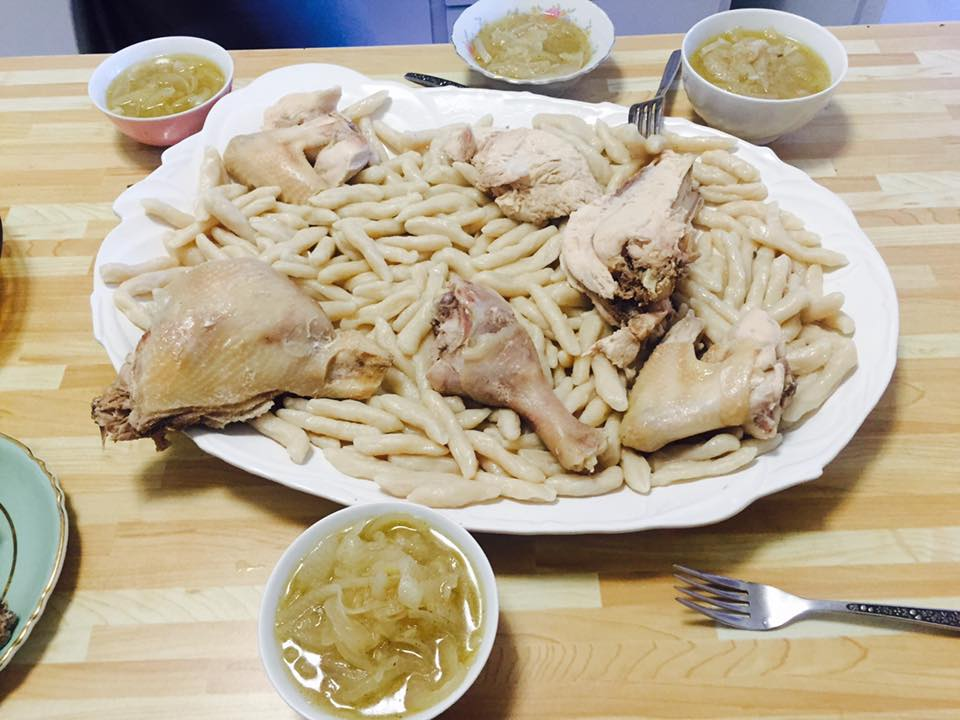
- Place of origin: Chechen Republic
- Region or state: North Caucasus

Zhizhig-galnash (Chechen: Жижиг-Галнаш) is a traditional Chechen dish consisting of boiled meat and dumplings, which are cooked in the flavorful broth made from beef, chicken or lamb.

== Description ==
The dish features tender, slow-boiled meat, accompanied by dumpling-like dough pieces that are boiled in the broth of the meat, which absorbs the rich, savory broth taste. The dumplings, often irregular in shape, are an essential part of the dish, soaking up the beef's essence during the cooking process.The dumplings are tender and delicate, providing a mild base, while the meat contributes a rich, savory depth. A garlic sauce is often served alongside the meat and dumplings. Traditionally, the rich meat broth is served either in bowls or poured over the dumplings, enhancing the dish with its comforting, savory essence.

Zhizhig-galnash holds significant cultural importance in Chechen society. Food is considered a symbol of hospitality, and this dish is commonly prepared for special occasions such as weddings, holidays, and family gatherings.

== Etymology ==
The word "zhizhig" in Chechen means "meat"; "galnash" means "dumplings".
