= Chepalgash =

Dish of Chechnya and Ingushetia

- Place of origin: Chechnya, Ingushetia
- Region or state: North Caucasus

Chepalgash (Chechen: ЧӀепалгаш) is a traditional national dish of Chechnya and Ingushetia.It is a cottage cheese filled bread, which consists of kefir, baking soda, wheat flour, salt, homemade dry cottage cheese, egg, green onions, and butter. It is sometimes described as "Chechen Khachapuri".

== Description ==
It is a closed flatbread made of kefir-based soft dough, with a filling of cottage cheese which is mixed in with an egg and green onions, cooked on a dry pan. After cooking, each flatbread is briefly dipped in hot water to remove any burnt spots and excess flour before being stacked in layers. It is served with melted butter or oil. Chepalgash is usually brought to the table on a tray, from which everyone eats, or on a separate plate for each person, cut into several pieces.

== Literature ==
- 50 000 избранных рецептов кулинарии СССР
- Увядшая роза: (биографическая повесть) Вахьидан Махьма Баснакъин, Саид-Хасан Махмаевых Баснакаев
- Чеченский угол — Ольга Тарасевич
- Кавказская кухня. Блюда из сыра, молока и яиц. Соусы и приправы. Кавказская
- Седой Кавказ: роман, — Канта Ибрагимов
