= Sanwin makin =

Desert with semolina, condensed milk

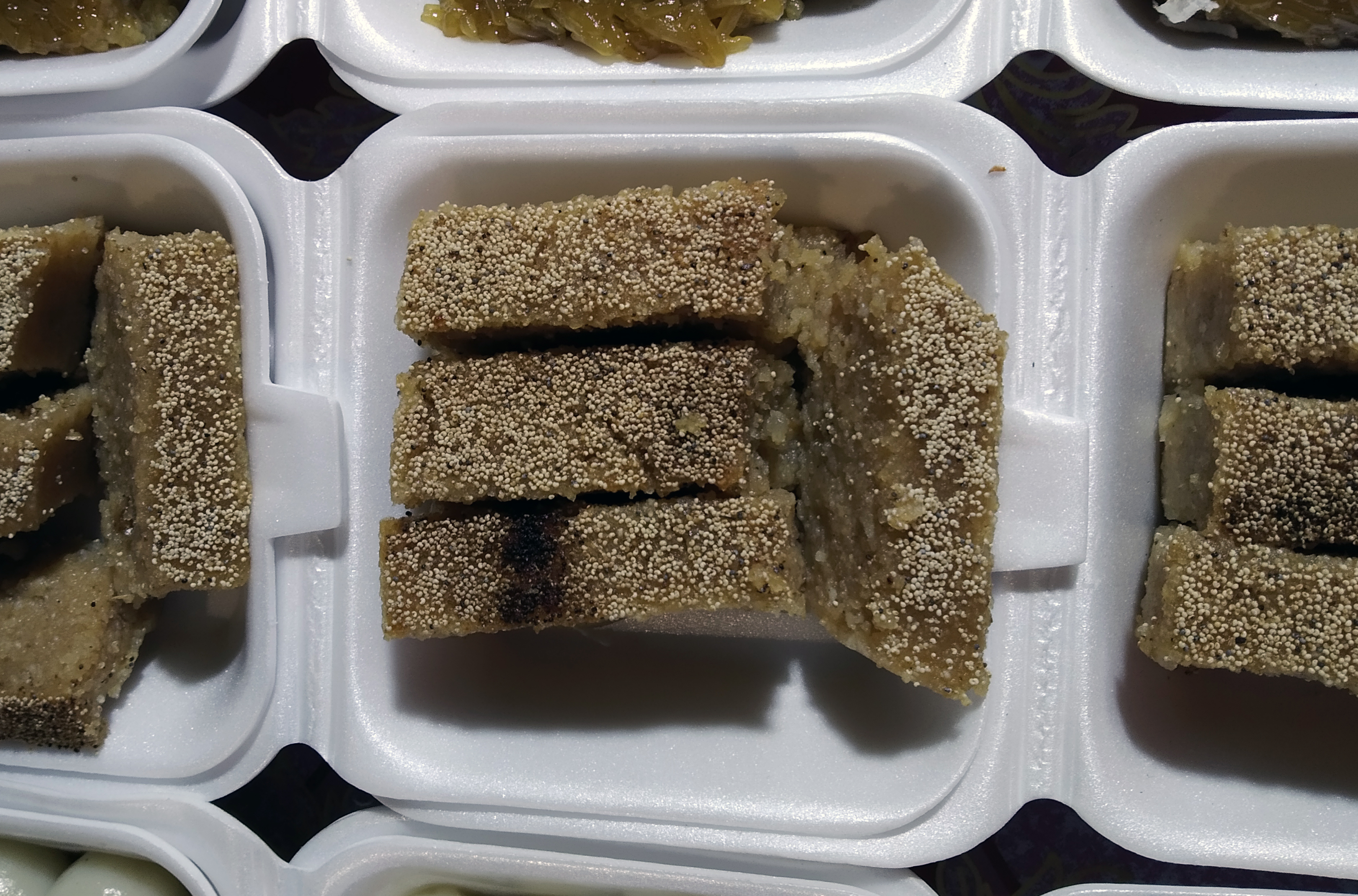
- Type: Dessert (mont)
- Place of origin: Myanmar (Burma)
- Region or state: Southeast Asia
- Associated cuisine: Burmese
- Main ingredients: semolina, condensed milk, butter, coconut milk, poppy seeds
- Similar dishes: Khanom mo kaeng, suji ka halwa, sugee cake

Sanwin makin (Burmese: ဆနွင်းမကင်း; pronounced [sʰənwɪ́ɴməkɪ́ɴ], also spelt sa-nwin-ma-kin) is a traditional Burmese dessert or mont, popularly served during traditional donation feasts, satuditha feasts, and as a street snack. The dessert bears resemblance to desserts in neighboring India, where it is called sooji halwa, and Thailand, where it is called khanom mo kaeng.

The most popular form of the dessert, known as shwegyi sanwin makin (ရွှေချီဆနွင်းမကင်း) or shwegyi mont (ရွှေချီဆနွင်းမုန့်), principally uses semolina, condensed milk, butter, coconut milk, poppy seeds. Some recipes call for eggs, cashew nuts, and raisins. In recent years, semolina has been substituted with other starches to create variations such as potato sanwin makin (အာလူးဆနွင်းမကင်း) and banana sanwin makin (ငှက်ပျောဆနွင်းမကင်း).
