= Kesari bat =

Sweet Indian food

Kesari bath
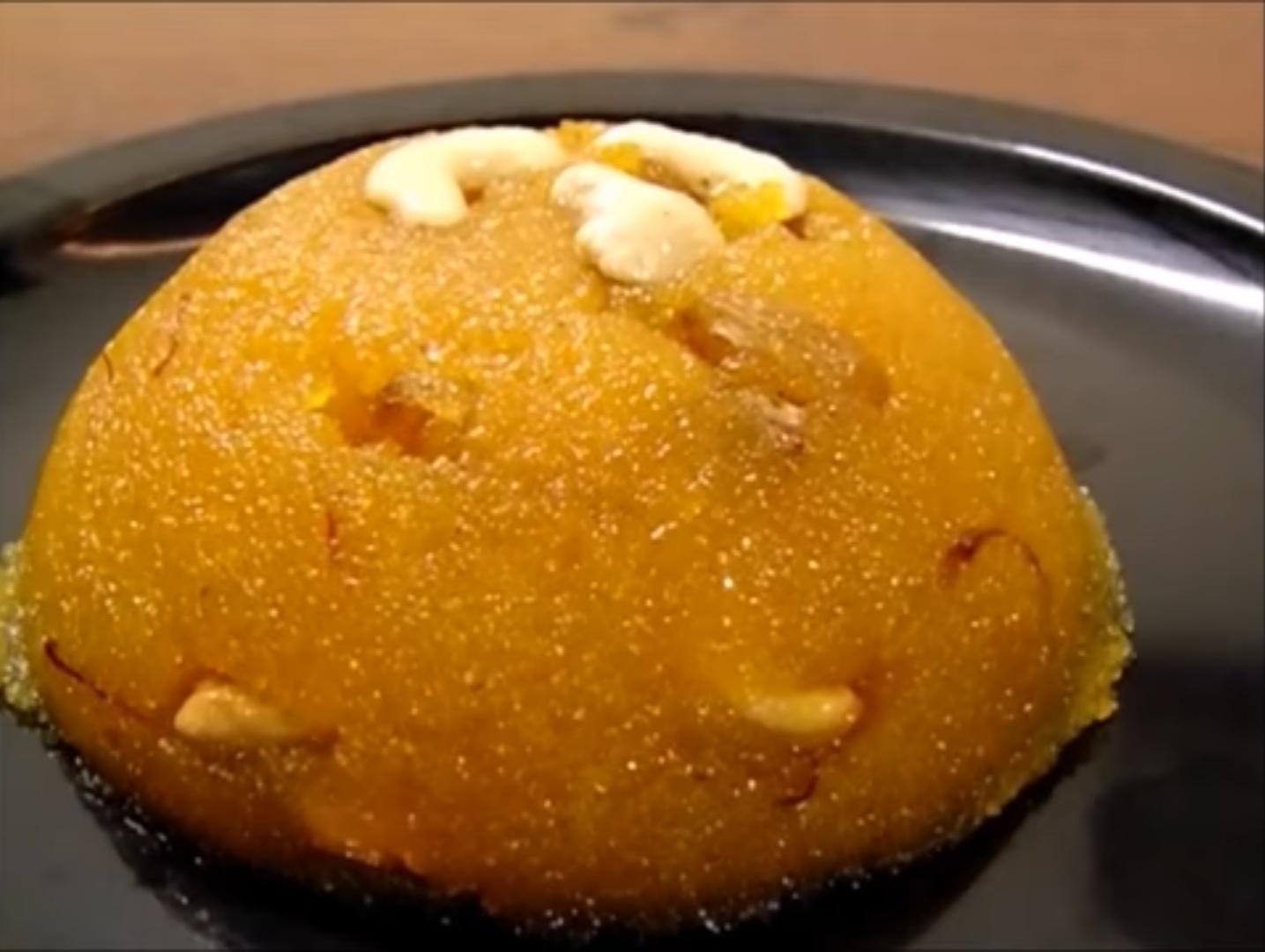
- Kesari bath with cashews
- Alternative names: ಕೇಸರಿ ಬಾತ್, ரவா கேசரி, రవ్వ కేసరి, रवा केसरी बाथ, റവ കേസരി
- Course: Breakfast in Karnataka, northern Tamil Nadu and Kerala; dessert in other places
- Place of origin: India
- Region or state: Karnataka, Kerala, Tamil Nadu and Andhra Pradesh
- Main ingredients: Semolina, sugar, ghee

Kesari bath or kesari baat (Kannada: ಕೇಸರಿ ಬಾತ್) is a South Indian dessert. The classic ingredients used for its preparation are semolina, sugar, ghee (usually), water, and milk. The sweet is more commonly known as jonnadula halwa in certain parts of northern India.

The precise composition of kesari bath varies regionally depending on the availability of ingredients. The dish might be prepared with pineapple, banana, mango, coconut, or rice.

Claims to the origin of the dish are made by Karnataka. The dish is common in the cuisine of Karnataka as well as of multiple regions in South India and is a popular dish during festivals such as Ugadi. The word kesari in multiple Indian languages refers to the spice saffron, which creates the dish's saffron-orange-yellow-colored tinge. Though it is a sweet dish, in Andhra Pradesh, Karnataka, Kerala and Tamil Nadu, it is prepared not only as a dessert but also for normal breakfasts. It is also served with upma, rava khichdi or khara bath, and a serving of both dishes on one plate is popularly called "chow chow bath".

In North India, it is served as a sweet dish called suji halwa, suji being the Hindi word for semolina or rava. It uses similar ingredients to kesari baat such as ghee, sugar, semolina and water. Nuts and raisins are often added, and sometimes saffron may also be added. This dish is ideally, and most commonly, served hot.

== History ==
The dish is listed as shali-anna in Manasollasa, a 12th-century work by the Chalukya king Someshvara III.

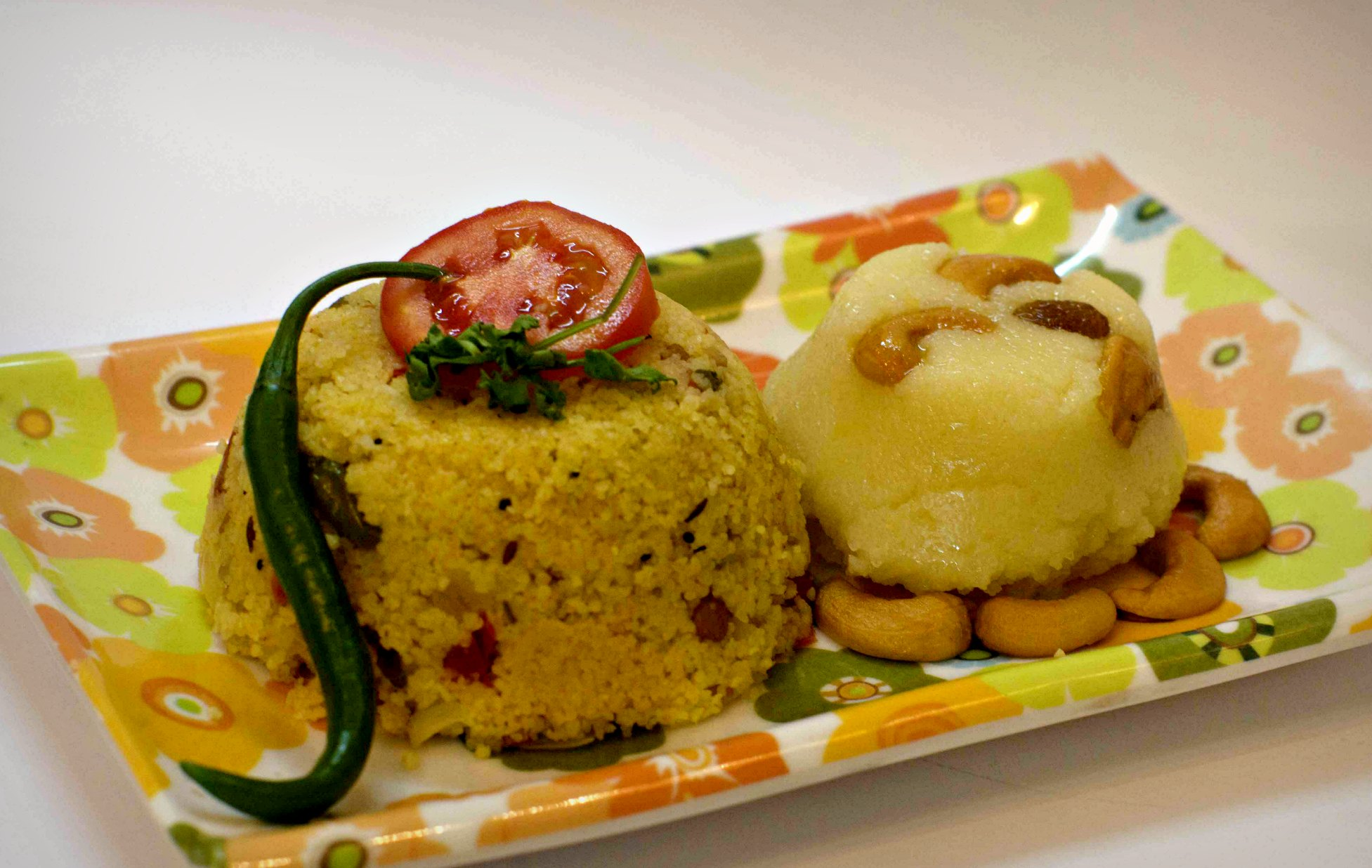
Chow chow bath, a common breakfast in Karnataka, consists of one serving of the spicy khara bat and another of a sweet kesari bath.

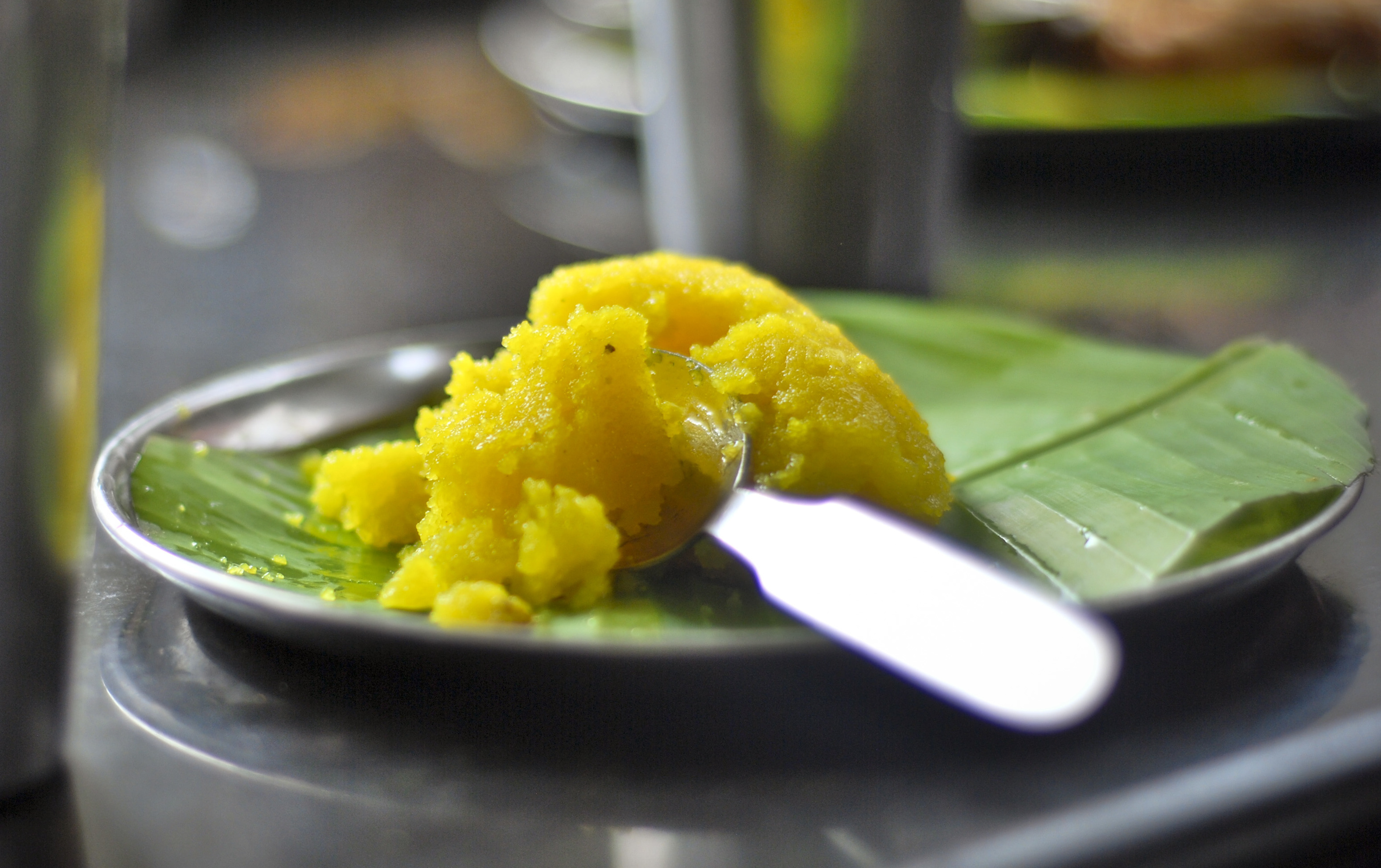
Kesari bath is traditionally served on a banana leaf in southern India.

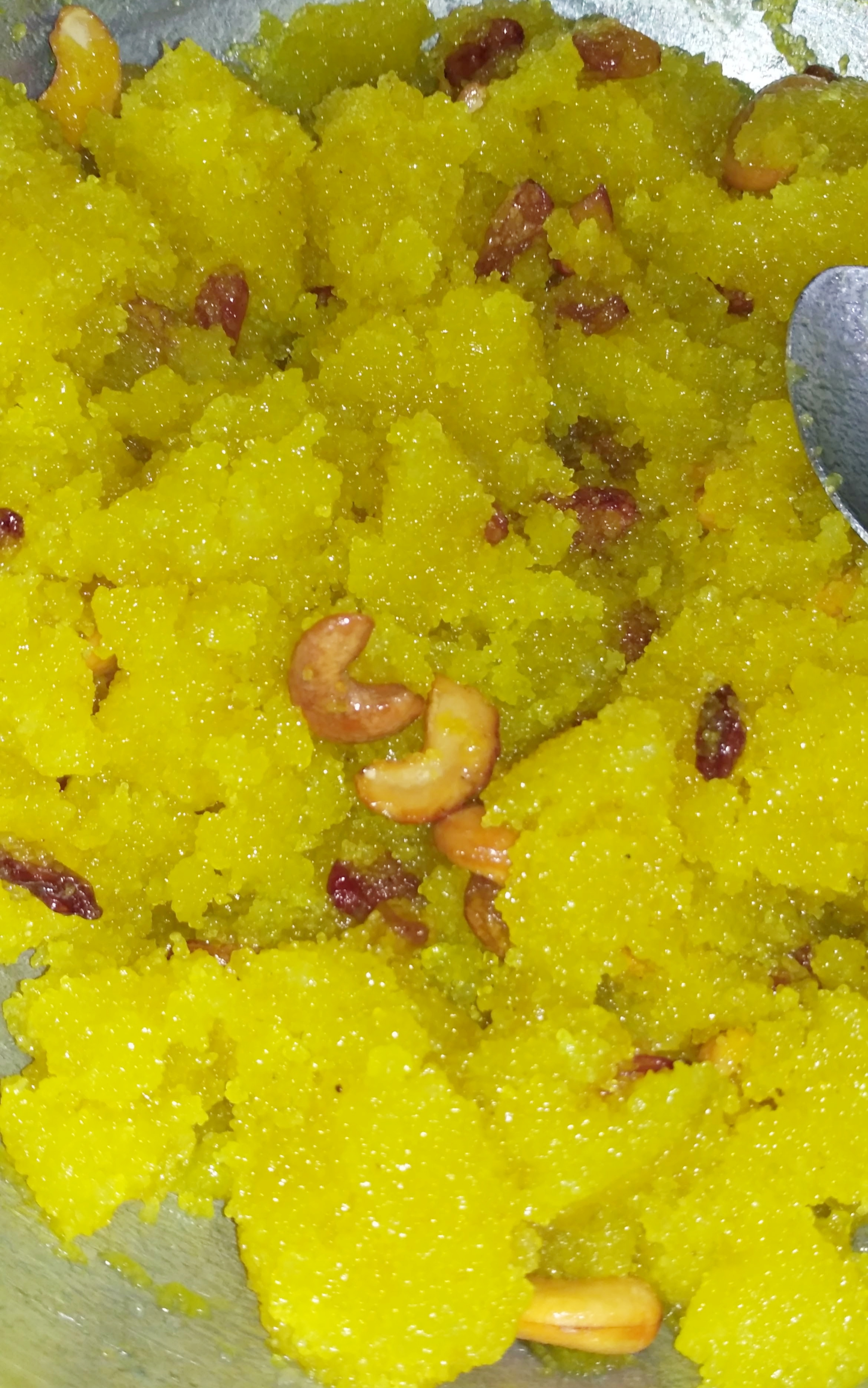
Typical Karnataka-style lemon-coloured kesari bhath with cashew nuts
