= Halva =

Confections often made from nut butters or flours

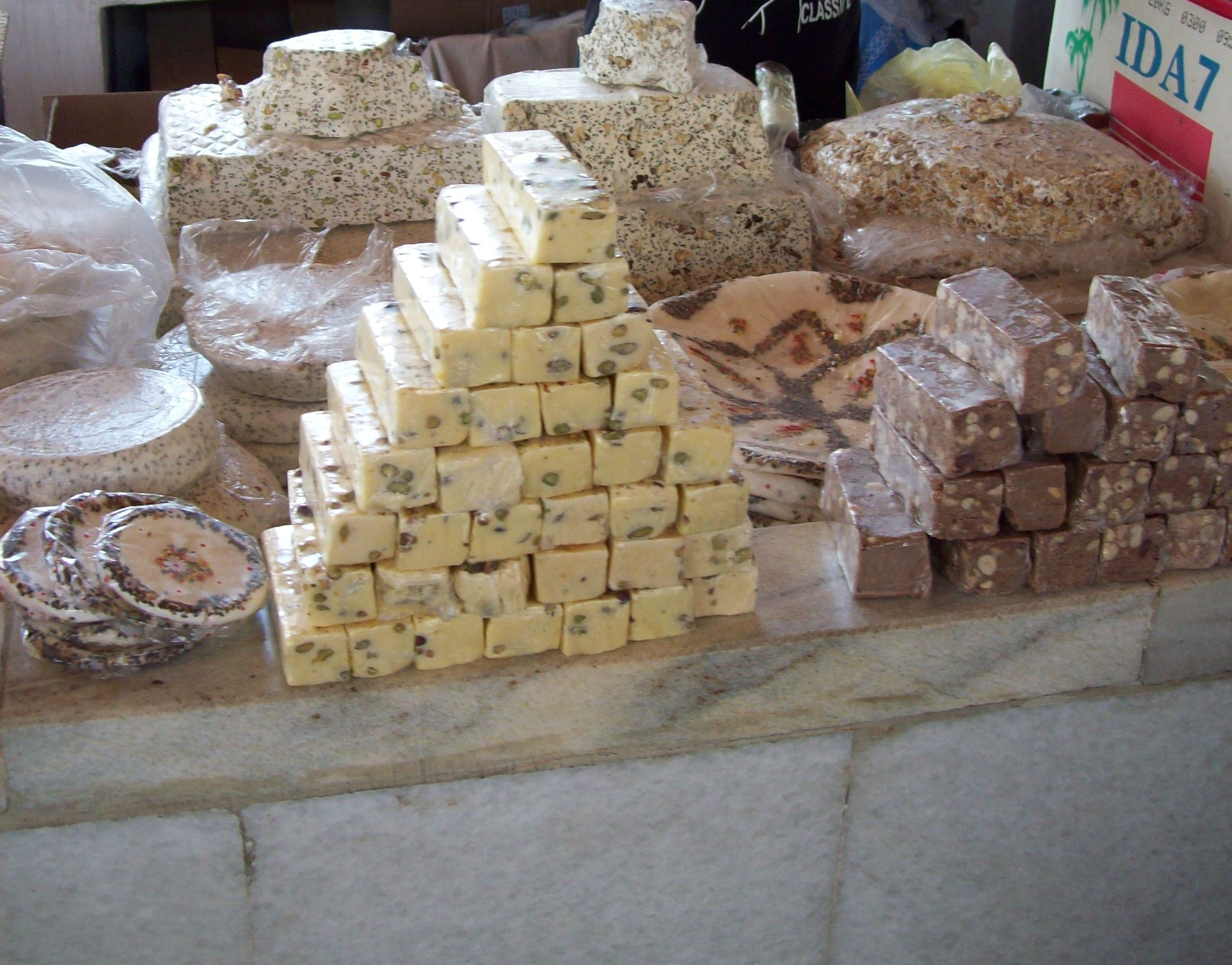
- Type: Confectionery, dessert
- Place of origin: Iran (Persia)
- Region or state: Middle East, South Asia, Central Asia, Eastern Europe, Balkans, South Caucasus, North Africa, Horn of Africa
- Serving temperature: Cold

Halva (also helva, halvah, halwa, halua) is a type of confectionery that is found throughout North Africa, East Africa, Eastern Europe, the Balkans, West Asia, Central Asia, South Asia, and the Levant. The name refers to a broad variety of recipes, generally a thick paste made from flour, butter, oil, saffron, rosewater, milk, turmeric powder, and sugar.

== Etymology ==
The word halva entered the English language between 1840 and 1850 from Romanian, which came from Ottoman Turkish: حلوى, romanized: helva, itself ultimately derived from Arabic: حلاوة, romanized: ḥalwat to Persian: حلوا, romanized: halwā, a sweet confection. The root in Arabic: ح ل و, romanized: ḥ-l-w, means "sweet". In the pre-Islamic period, the name for the category of confections that would develop into halva was 𐭬𐭱𐭩𐭠 𐭧𐭥𐭫𐭲𐭩𐭪 rōγn xwardīg in Middle Persian, literally meaning "oil food".

== History ==
Halva originated in Persia (modern-day Iran). In the 7th century in the Arabian Peninsula, the word denoted a paste of dates that had been kneaded with milk. By the 9th century, the term was applied to numerous kinds of sweets, including the now-familiar sweetened cooked semolina or flour paste. The first proper recipes of halva were documented in the 13th-century Arabic cookbook Kitab al-Tabikh (The Book of Dishes), as well as an anonymous cookbook from 13th-century Al-Andalus.

Athenaeus mentions an ancient Greek dish called "sesamidios" (Ancient Greek: σησαμίδιός), which is described as a spherical cake made of honey, roasted sesame seeds, and oil; this dish is considered to have been the same as the sesame seed-based version of halva. Halva was also eaten in the Byzantine Empire, where it was well-attested. Later, it was adopted by the Ottoman Turks, including the sesame-based version, and spread throughout their empire. A description of sesame-based halwa (called Arabic: حلاوة طحينية) can be found in an 1844 dictionary by Swedish Orientalist Jacob Berggren. According to Al Adib magazine, a factory for tahini halwa was established as early as 1874 in Beirut.

== Types ==
Most types of halva are relatively dense confections sweetened with sugar or honey. Their textures, however, vary. For example, semolina-based halva's texture can range from a buttery, moist, clumpy couscous to something gelatinous and translucent, while sesame-based halva is drier and more crumbly.

=== Grain-based halva ===
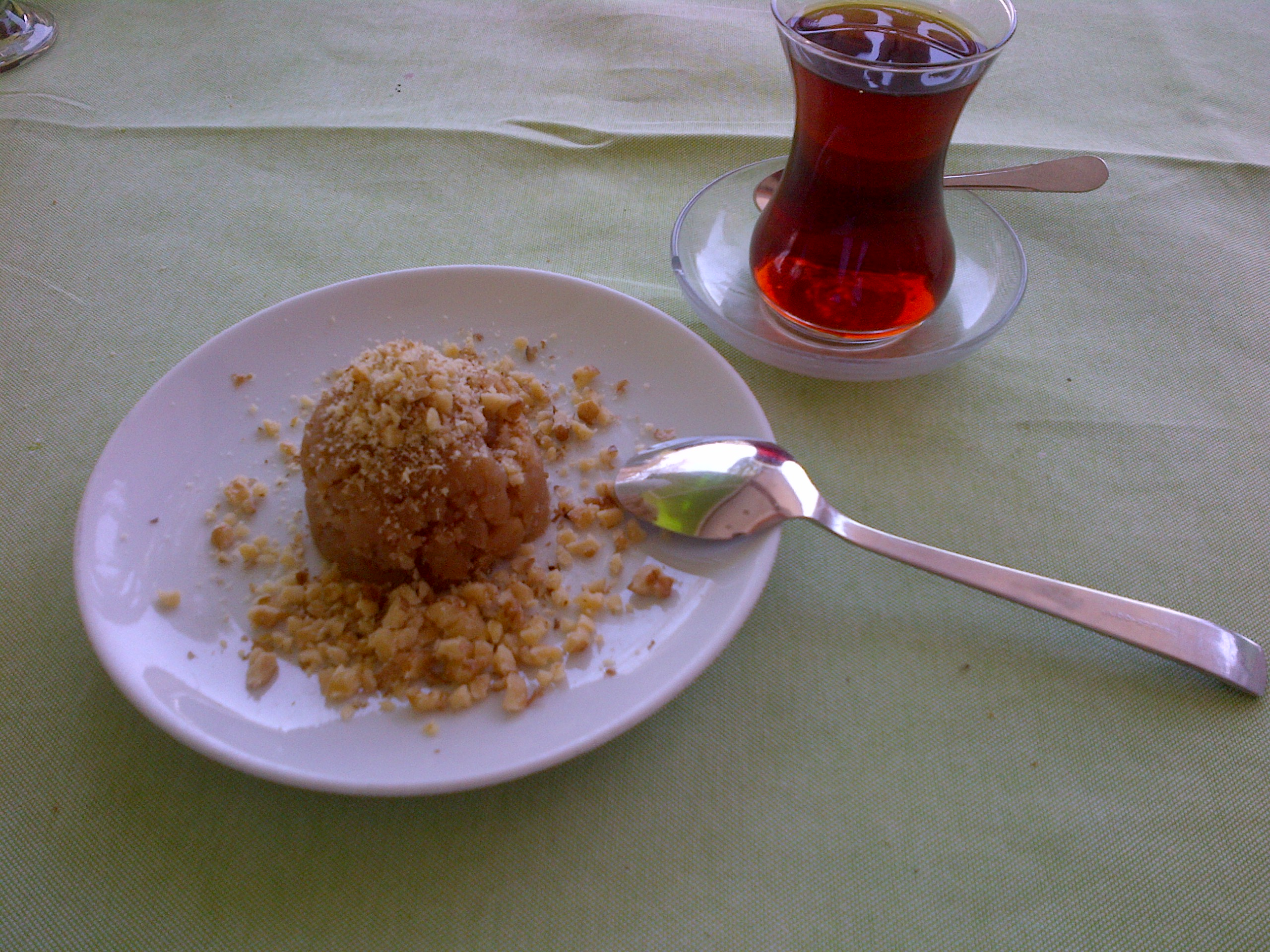
Turkish un helvası, a flour-based halva

Grain-based halva is made by toasting flour or cornstarch in oil, mixing it into a roux, and then cooking it with a sugary syrup. Corn is rarely used.

Dishes made from wheat semolina include suji ka halwa in India, Pakistan, Shujir Halua in Bangladesh and irmik helvası in Turkey. In these dishes, semolina is toasted in fat, either oil or butter, and then mixed with water or milk and sugar to achieve the desired flavor and consistency. Wheat-based sohan halwa in northern India and Pakistan is a renowned delicacy made by combining wheat flour with milk, sugar, clarified butter, cardamom, saffron, and nuts such as almonds and pistachios. The mixture is slow-cooked, allowing the sugar to caramelize, which gives Sōhan halvā its firm and brittle texture.

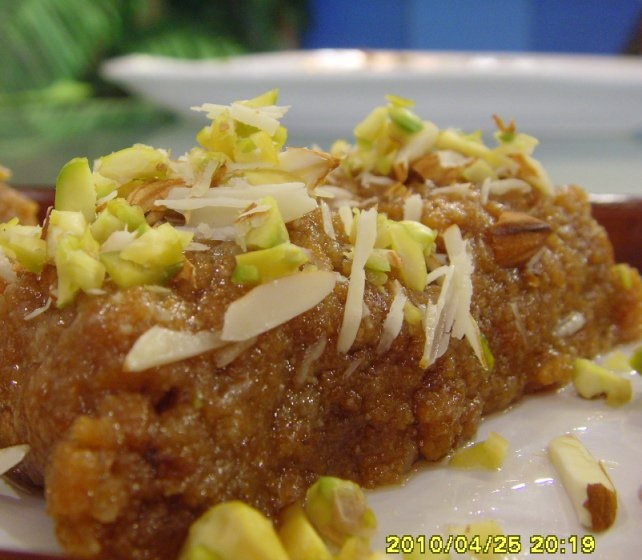
Multani Sōhan halvā in Pakistan.

Dairy-based rice flour halva, known as Pathein halawa, is considered a Burmese delicacy native to the city of Pathein.

=== Sesame ===
Sesame halva is popular in the Balkans, Poland, the Middle East, and other areas surrounding the Mediterranean Sea.

The primary ingredients in this confection are sesame butter or paste (tahini), and sugar, glucose or honey. Soapwort (called ‘erq al halaweh in Arabic; çöven in Turkish), or egg white are added in some recipes to stabilize the oils in the mixture or create a distinctive texture for the resulting confection. Other ingredients and flavorings, such as pistachio nuts, cocoa powder, orange juice, vanilla, or chocolate are often added to the basic tahini and sugar base.

=== Sunflower ===
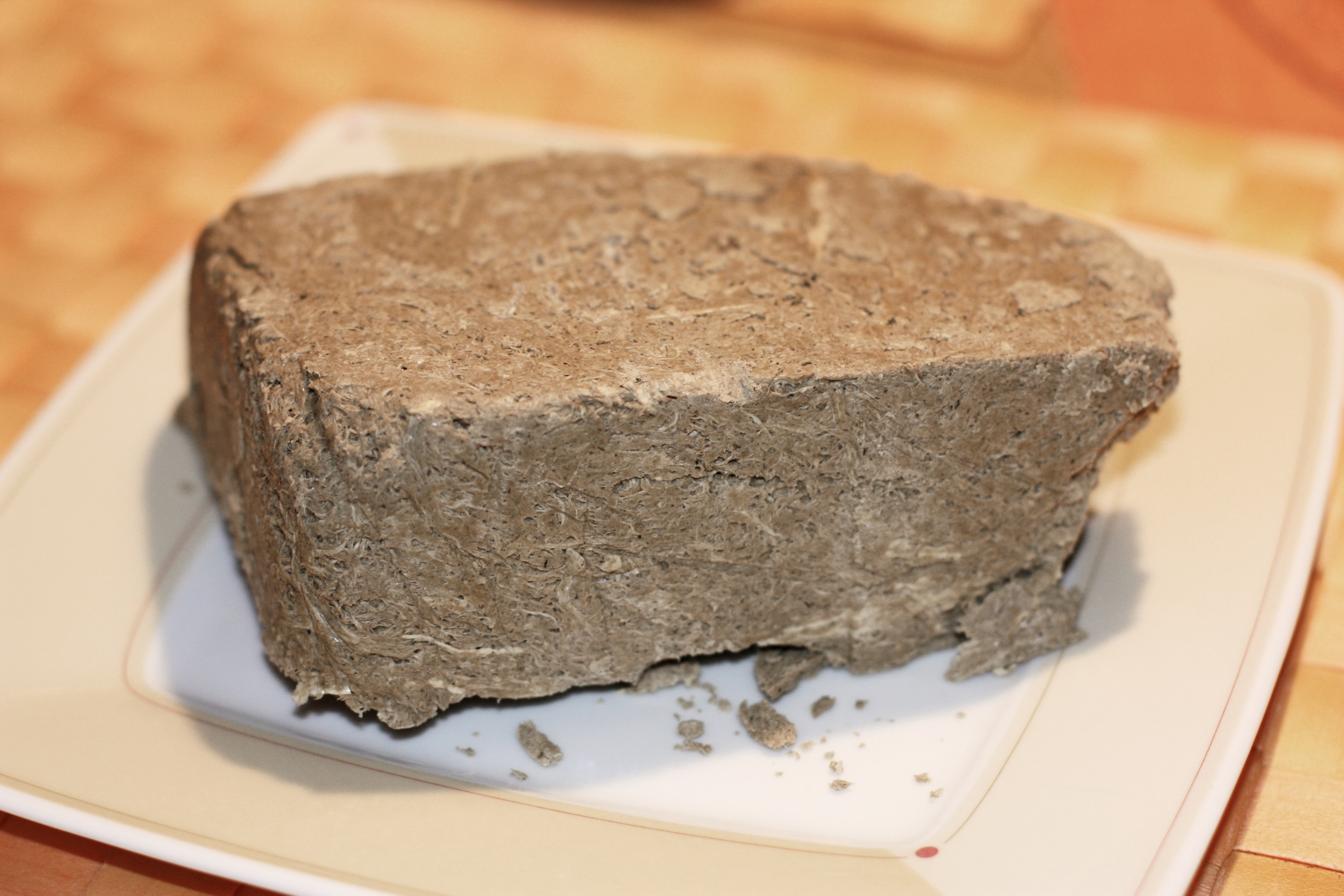
Sunflower halva

Sunflower halva is popular in the countries of the former Soviet Union as well as in Bulgaria and Romania. It is made of roasted ground sunflower seeds instead of sesame. It may include other ingredients, such as nuts, cocoa powder, or vanilla. In 1996 around 4–5 thousand tonnes of sunflower halva were being produced by Ukraine annually.

=== Peanuts ===
In Argentina, Greek immigrants at the beginning of the 20th century created a kind of halva called mantecol from peanut butter, currently marketed under the name of Mantecol and also Nucrem. Such a product is widely consumed in the country.

=== Carrots ===
Gajar ka halwa, or gajorer halua, is a popular halva in India, Pakistan and Bangladesh. It is made by slow-cooking grated carrots with milk, sugar, and ghee (clarified butter), often flavored with cardamom and garnished with nuts such as almonds, pistachios, or cashews. Sometimes, khoya (reduced milk solids) or condensed milk is added to enhance its richness and flavor.

=== Other ===
==== Floss halva ====
Pişmaniye (Turkish) or floss halva is a traditional sweet, prepared in Kocaeli, Turkey, made by flossing thin strands of halva into a light confection. Made primarily of wheat flour and sugar, the strands are continuously wrapped into a ball shape and then compressed. The result is a halva with a light consistency, similar to cotton candy. Floss halva can be found in regular and pistachio flavors, and there are brands with halal or kosher certifications.

In Chinese cuisine, a floss-like candy similar to pişmaniye or pashmak halva, known as dragon beard candy, is eaten as a snack or dessert.

A raw version of halva also became popular among proponents of raw food diets. In this version, a mixture of raw sesame tahini, raw almonds, raw agave nectar, and salt are blended together and frozen to firm.

== Cultural and national variations ==
=== Albania ===
Albanian halva (Albanian: hallvë) tends to have flour, sugar, and olive oil and is similar to nougat. It is often topped with nuts.

=== Armenia ===
Armenian halva tends to have semolina flour, sesame, honey, butter, and sugar.

=== Azerbaijan ===
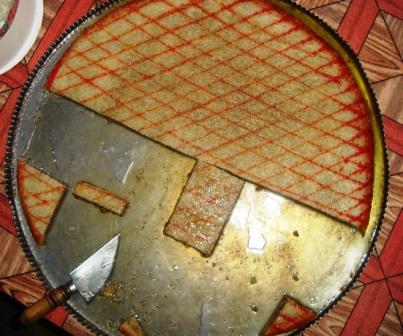
Şəki halvası

One regional variant is from Sheki, where Şəki halvası halva refers to a layered bakhlava-style pastry filled with spiced-nut mix and topped by crisscrossed patterns of a red syrup made from saffron, dried carrot and beetroot.

=== Greece ===
Halva is a traditional fasting food among Greeks who traditionally have food restrictions due to Greek Orthodox fasting periods, especially from meat, on Wednesdays and Fridays throughout the year, and for all of Great Lent. Halva is also frequently served as a dessert, or at "paniyiria" (village festivals).

It is most commonly made of sesame or semolina throughout Greece; however, one regional variation originates from the Thessaly town of Farsala (known as "Halva Farsalon") where it is made of cornflour.

=== India ===
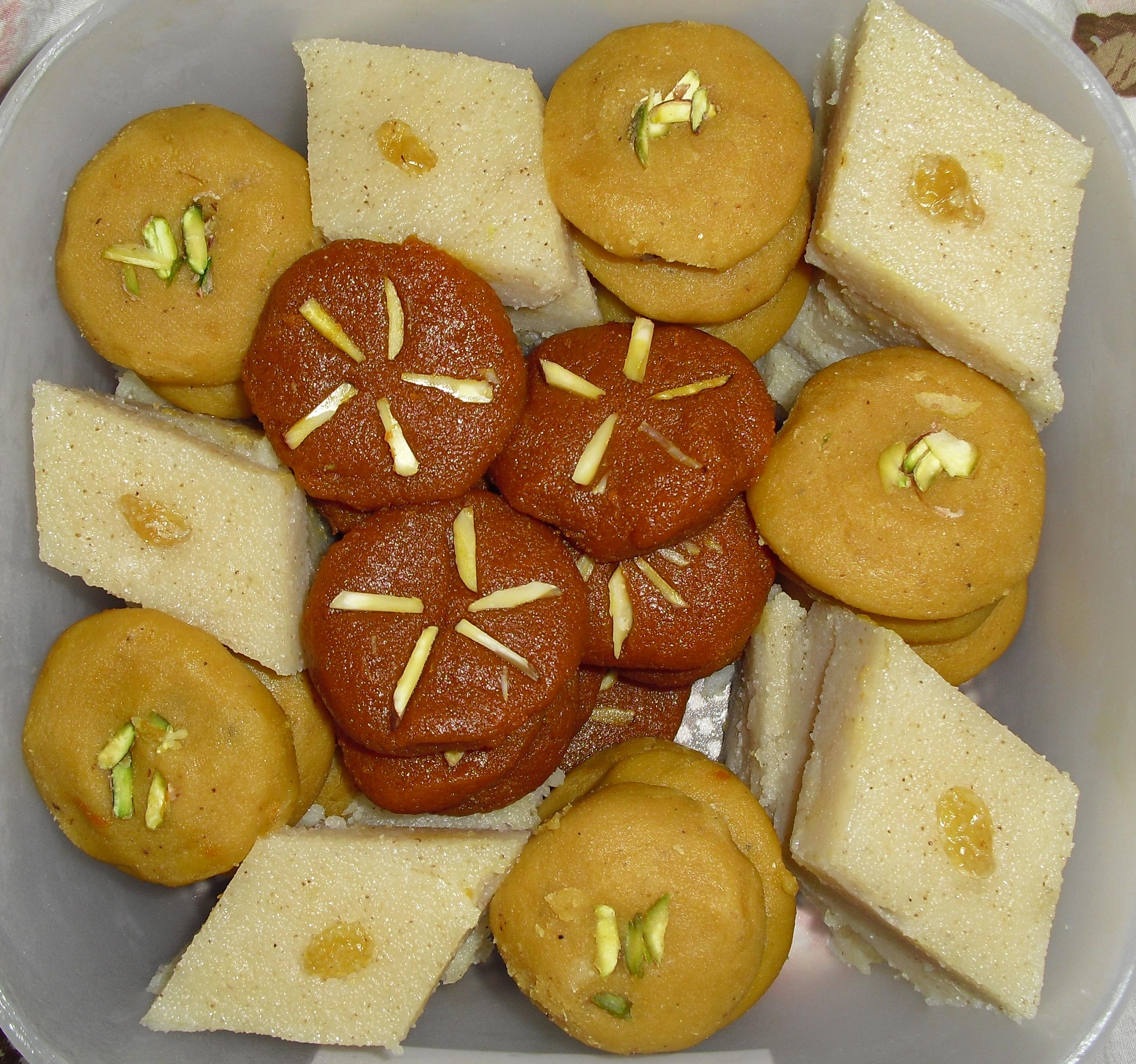
Some assorted Indian halva including sooji halva (diamond shapes), chana halva (light circles), and gajar halva (dark circles)

India has many types of halva, some unique to particular regions of the country. It is one of the popular sweets of India usually made from semolina.

The town of Bhatkal in Coastal Karnataka is famous for its unique banana halwa which is infused with either whole cashews, pistachio or almonds. This type of authentic halwa is a specialty of the Muslims of this town. The Udupi cuisine has halwa made from banana, wheat, ashgourd, and jackfruit.

It is speculated that halva (or halwa) is associated with Indian traditions and culture. Written records of sweets from Mānasollāsa mention a sweet called shali-anna, a type of semolina halwa which is today known as kesari in South India.

Tirunelveli in Tamil Nadu is known for its wheat halwa. Its preparation is a laborious process that "is slowly seeing this sweet disappear." Unlike other sweets, the extra ghee is not drained out but forms an outer layer. This increases the shelf life of the halwa. Locals attribute the unique taste of the halwa to the water of the Thamirabarani.

The history of Kozhikode Halwa in Kerala could trace back to the Zamorin era. The Zamorin invited chefs from Gujarat to prepare halwa for their royal feast. They were also granted places to stay beside the royal kitchen. This settlement later evolved as a sweet sellers' street, nowadays known as SM (Sweet Meat) Street or Mittayitheruvu. Kozhikode halwa is made of pure coconut oil, not from ghee. Kozhikode halwa also builds religious harmony; Ayyappa devotees from neighboring states Karnataka and Andhra Pradesh buy halwa and chips like prasadam (sacred food). They distribute them among their neighbors and friends, who consume them with a religious zeal.

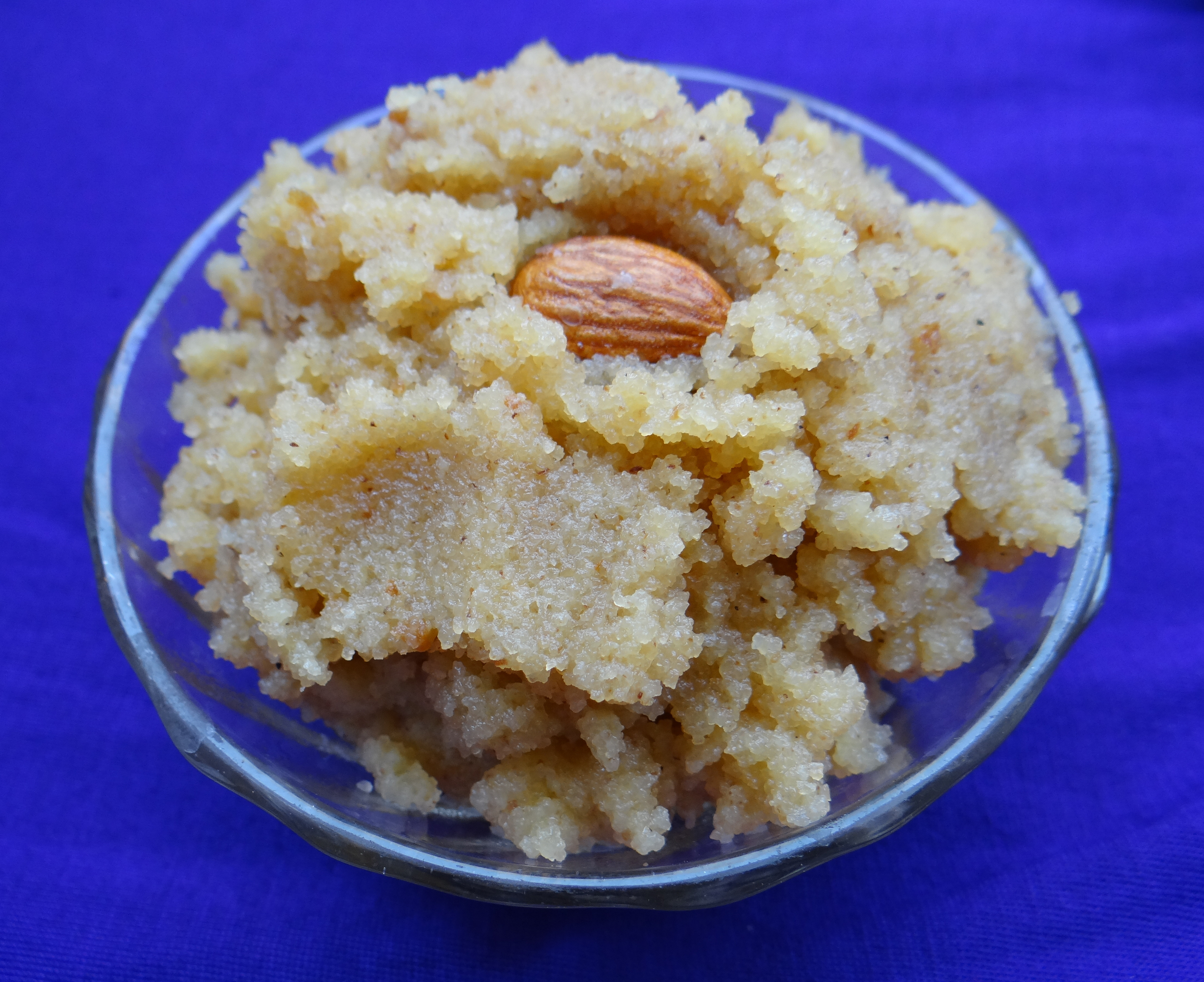
Sooji halwa made from semolina or sooji

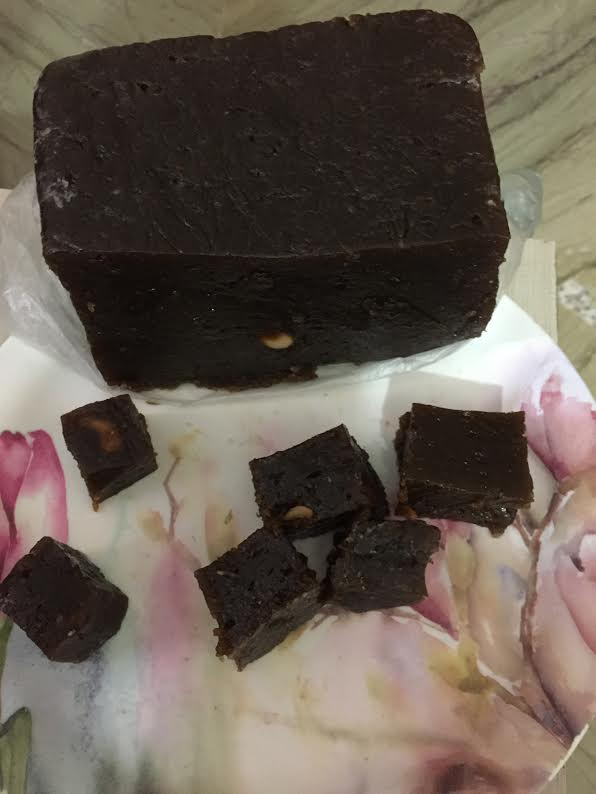
Black halwa from Kerala

=== Iran ===
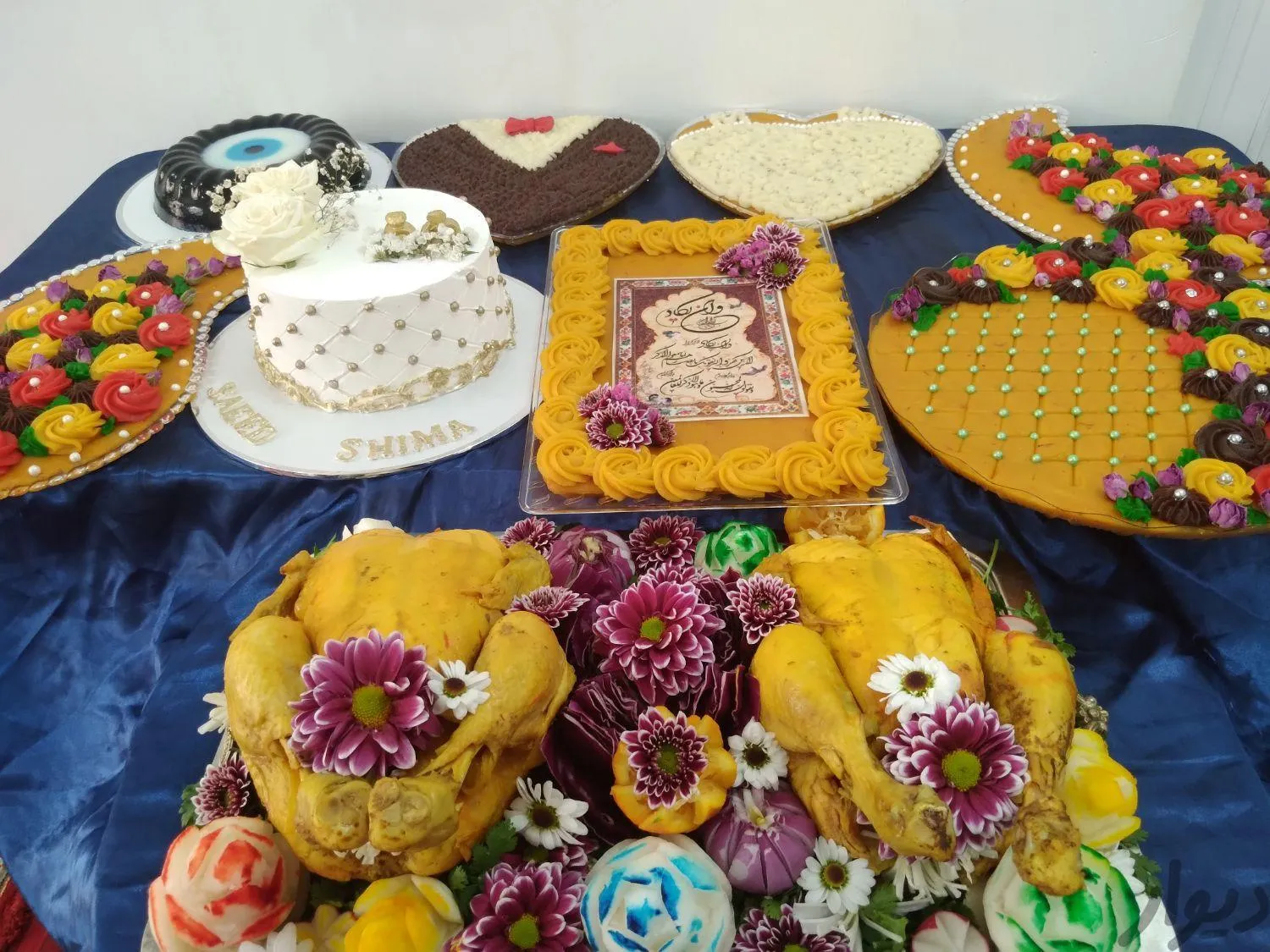
Platters of halva are served with a cake, a jelly pudding, and cooked chickens in Iranian wedding celebrations

In Iran, halva (Persian: حلوا) usually refers to a related confection made from wheat flour and butter and flavored with saffron and rose water. The final product has a yellow, brown, or dark brown color. The halva is spread thin on a plate and left until it dries into a paste. Halva usually is served at wedding celebrations, religious ceremonies, and funerals.

Halva ardeh is the Iranian term for tahini-based halva, and may or may not include whole pistachios. Ardeh is processed sesame in the form of paste, usually sweetened with syrup.

=== Israel ===
Tahini halvah (Hebrew: חלווה) is very popular in Israel. Israeli halvah is made from sesame tahini and sugar. It is generally sold in slabs, with or without nuts. Vanilla, or vanilla with chocolate swirls are perhaps the most common, but there are many different varieties. Halvah is parve. It is often served as a breakfast component at Israeli hotels.

It is also used in specialty ice cream, which is made of sesame halva, tahini, eggs, cream, and sugar, and usually topped with pistachios and silan (date syrup).

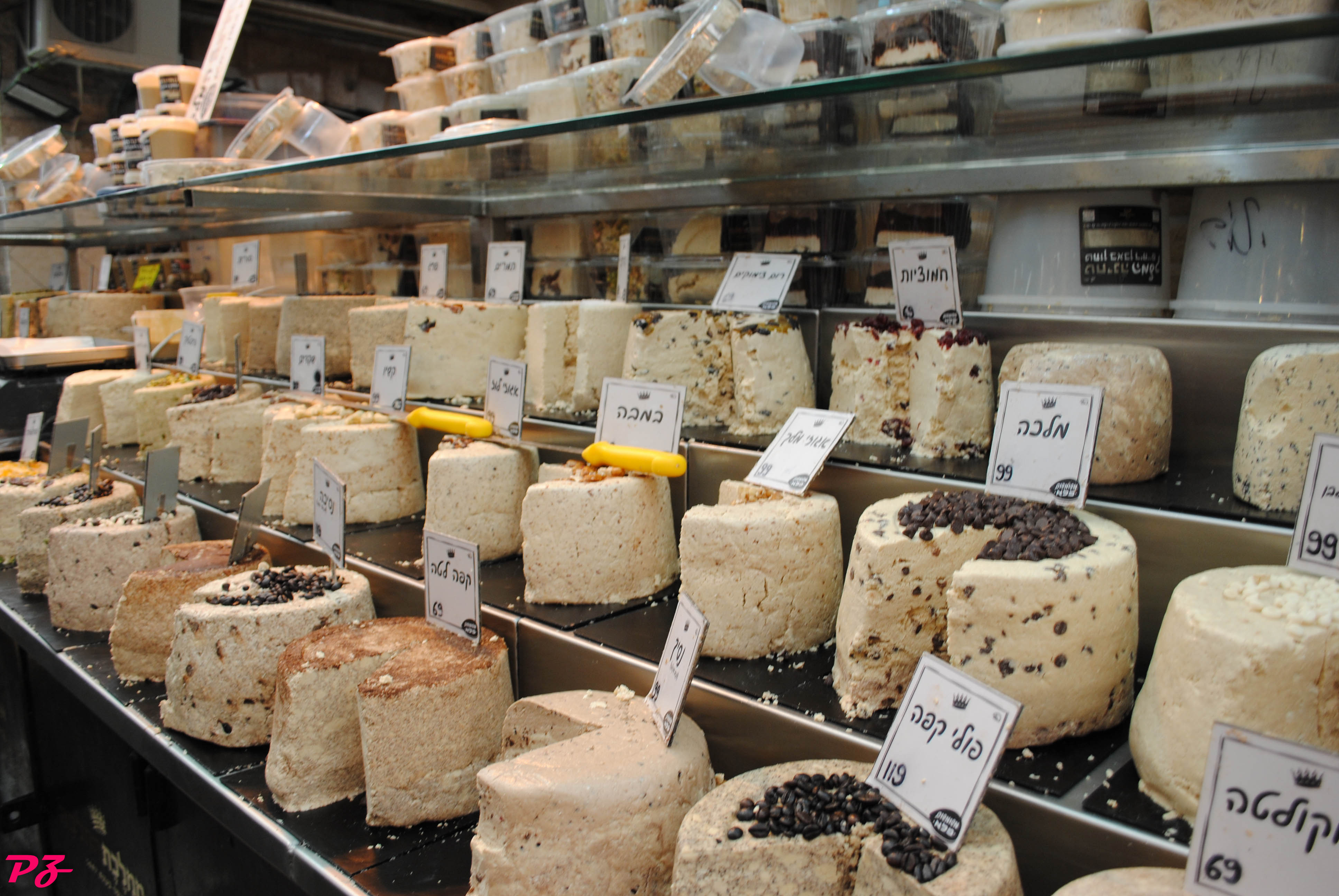
Israeli halva displays at the Mahane Yehuda Market in Jerusalem

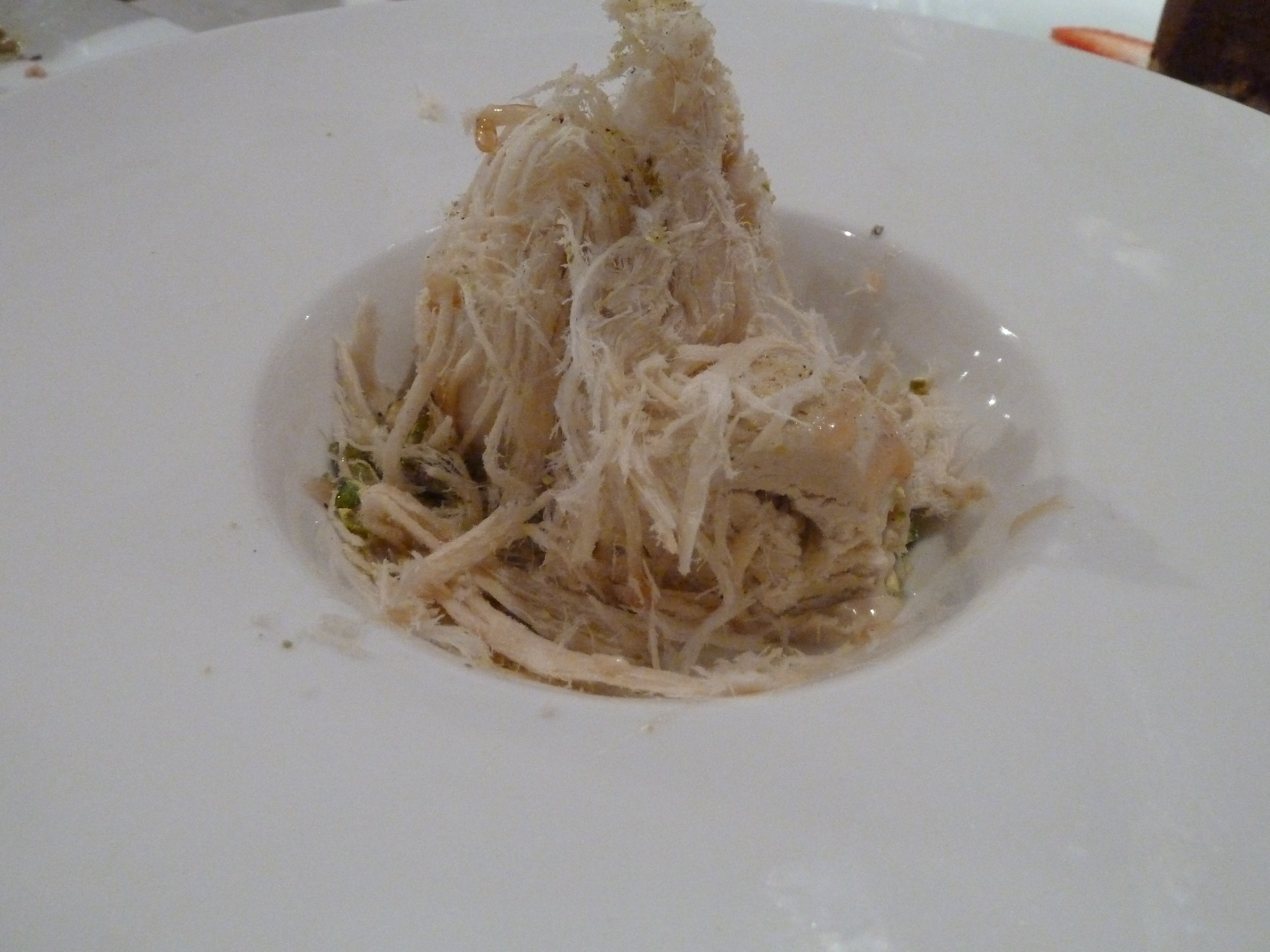
Halva ice cream

=== Italy ===
Halva has become popular in Italy. In 2023, the artisanal confectionery laboratory The Halva Lab was established in Sassuolo, producing halva inspired by Mediterranean and Middle Eastern traditions but made without added sugars.

=== Kenya ===
Kenyan halva tends to have flour, sugar, honey, butter, and olive oil. It is generally sold in slabs, with or without nuts.

=== Myanmar (Burma) ===
In Myanmar (Burma), halawa (ဟလဝါ) generally refers to Pathein halawa (ပုသိမ်ဟလဝါ), a Burmese confection or mont made with glutinous rice flour, rice flour, milk, and coconut shavings originating in the Irrawaddy delta town of Pathein. Another popular semolina-based confection, which is known as sooji halawa in India, is called sanwin makin in Myanmar.

=== Palestine ===
In the West Bank, qizha (nigella sativa paste) flavored tahini halwa is traditionally made, as well as an "angel-hair" candy-floss-like variety of tahini halwa.

=== Somalia ===
In Somalia, halva is known as xalwo (also spelled halwo or xalwa). It is a popular sweet made from sugar, oil, and cornstarch, flavored with spices such as cardamom, nutmeg, or cloves, and sometimes enriched with peanuts. Xalwo is traditionally served at weddings, Eid celebrations, and other festive occasions, and is often offered to guests alongside Somali tea or coffee as a symbol of hospitality.

=== Syria ===
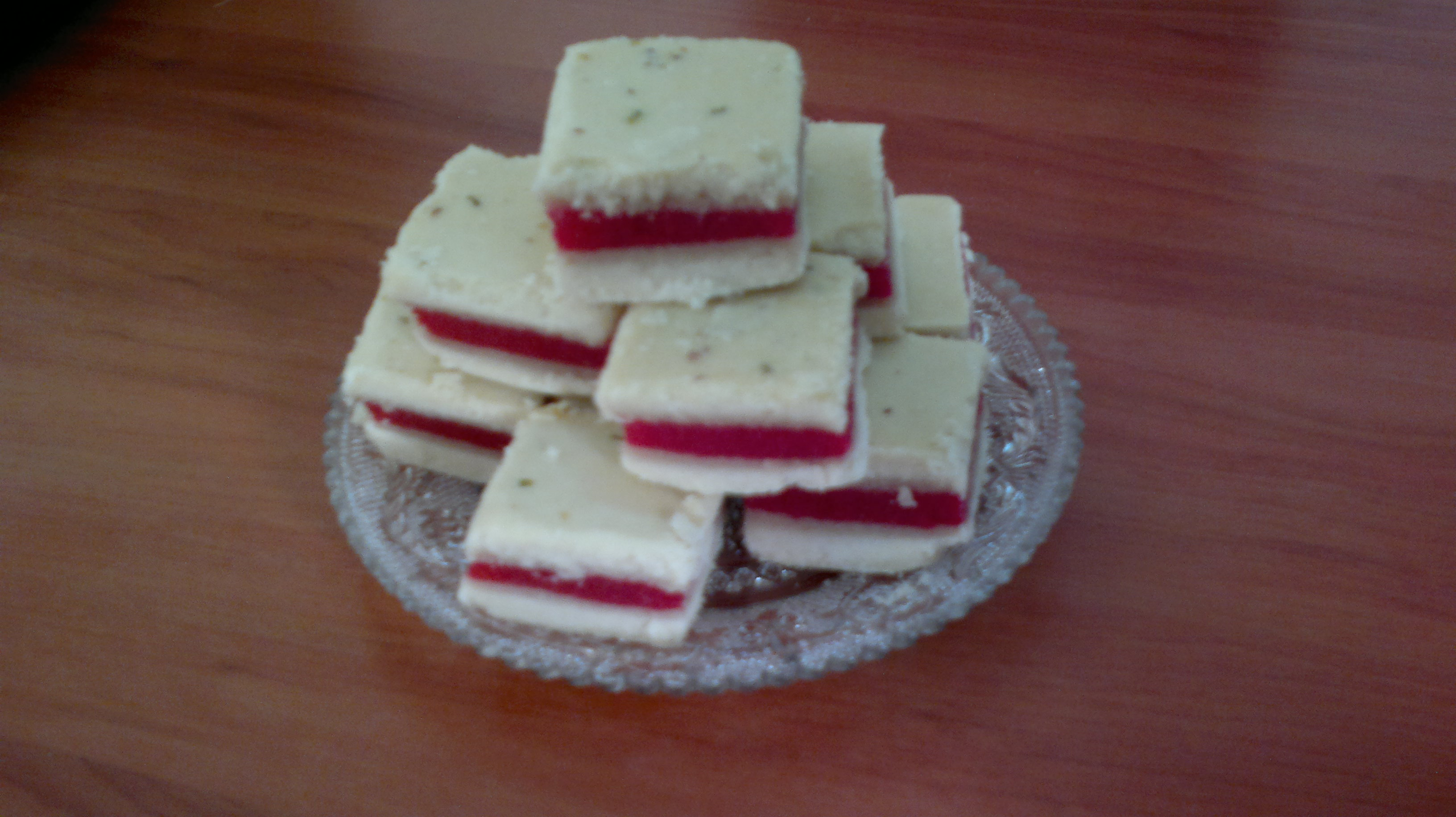
Halawet al-mahya, Syria

In Aleppo, Syria, Ma'mounia (مأمونية), named after Caliph Al-Ma'mun, is a variety of halwa made by cooking semolina in butter and then drenching it in syrup, creating something similar to semolina pudding; modern varieties add hard white cheese to the dessert. Syrian historian Khayr al-Din al-Asadi described 22 varieties of halwa being made in Aleppo in his 1971 encyclopedia. Halawat smeed (حلاوة سميد) is sometimes used to refer to varieties of semolina pudding.

Halawet al-mahya (Arabic: حلاوة المحيا) is a semolina and qatir based halwa made during the month of Sha'ban in the city of Hama, Syria.

=== Turkey ===
In Turkey, halva is served for special occasions such as births, circumcisions, weddings, and religious gatherings. The tradition is for semolina halva to be served at funerals, when someone leaves or returns from Hajj, and during Ramadan.

For this reason, flour (un) halva is also called in Turkish ölü helvası, meaning "halva of the dead". The expression "roasting halva for someone" suggests that the person referred to has died.

=== United States ===
Halva can be found in ethnic Indian, Jewish, Arab, Persian, Greek, and Balkan community stores and delicatessens as well as natural food stores. Besides being imported, it is manufactured in the United States, with the largest producer being Brooklyn-originated Joyva. In North America, halvah is a popular kosher confection and is widely available in Jewish enclaves, especially in areas of New York City and Brooklyn. Joyva is a popular producer of halvah and has been in operation in Brooklyn, NY since 1906.

== See also ==
- List of desserts
- Aluwa
- Barfi
- Mahim halwa
- Moong dal halwa
