= Noodles =

Staple food made from unleavened dough, commonly long and thin

Noodle
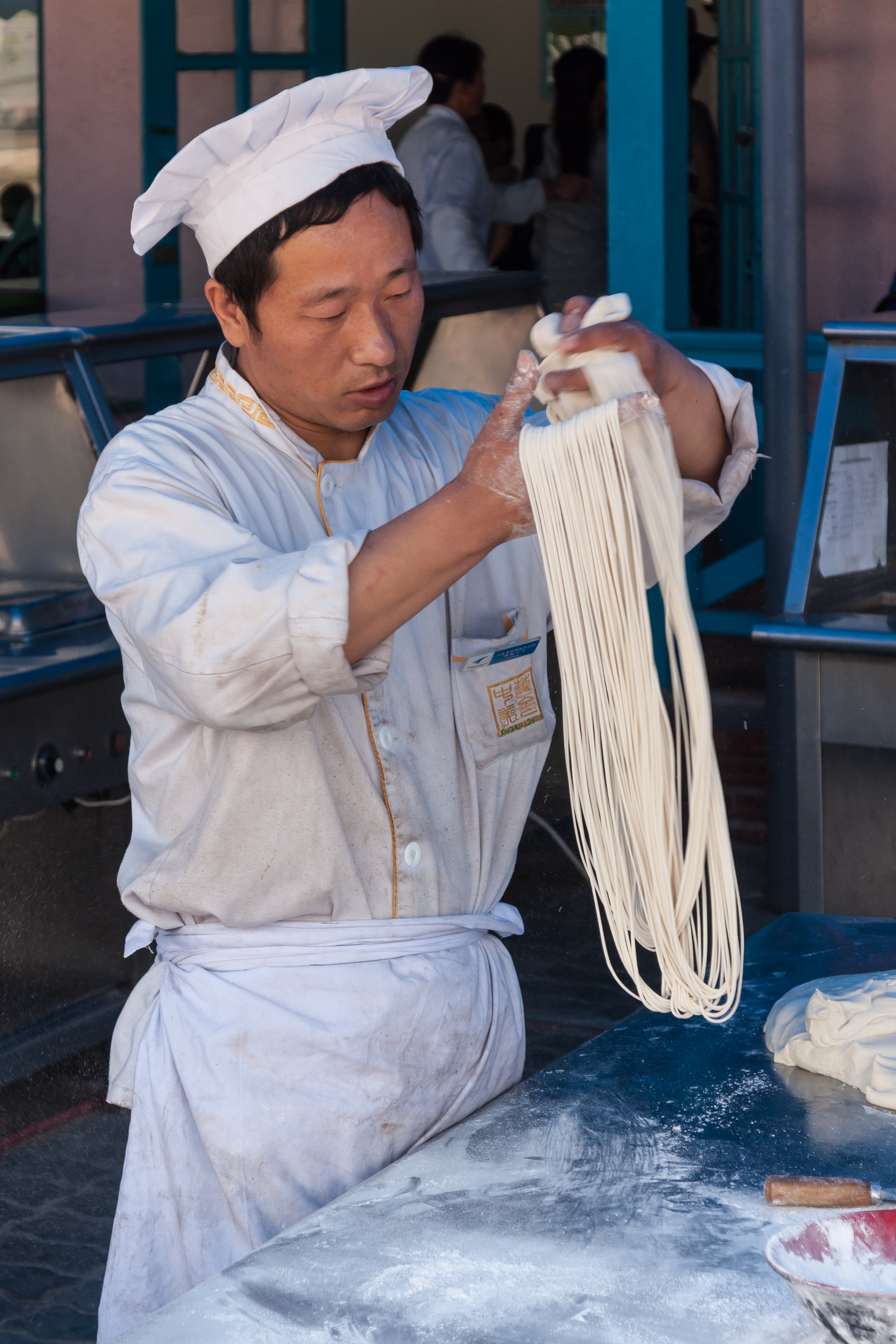
- Traditional noodle-making involving hand-pulling in Dalian, Liaoning, China
- Place of origin: The earliest record of noodles was discovered in northwestern China, from 4,000 years ago.
- Main ingredients: Unleavened dough

Noodles are a type of food typically made from unleavened dough which is rolled flat and cut, stretched, or extruded into long strips or strings. Noodles are a staple food in many cultures and made into a variety of shapes. The most common noodles are those derived from Chinese cuisine or Italian cuisine. Italian noodles are generally referred to as pasta. In Chinese cuisine, the overarching term for noodles is 麵 (miàn in Mandarin), which refers specifically to dough-based noodles made from wheat or other grain-based dough. Chinese noodles also include another category, called 粉 (fěn), which are not made by kneading dough but from a starch slurry, such as rice noodles (mǐfěn, 米粉), and cellophane noodles (fěnsī, 粉丝 / 粉絲). These are not made from wheat dough, but are still regarded as noodles in English due to their physical form and culinary role.

While long, thin strips may be the most common, many varieties of noodles are cut into waves, helices, tubes, strings, or shells, or folded over, or cut into other shapes. Noodles are usually cooked in boiling water, sometimes with cooking oil or salt added. They can also be steamed, pan-fried, deep-fried, or baked. Noodles are often served with an accompanying sauce or in a soup, the latter being known as noodle soup. Noodles can be refrigerated for short-term storage or dried and stored for future use.

== Etymology ==
The word for noodles in English was borrowed in the 18th century from the German word Nudel (German: [ˈnuːdl̩]). The German word likely came from Knodel or Nutel, and referred to any dumpling, though mostly of wheat.

Colloquial uses for noodle to refer to someone's head, or to a "dummy" are unrelated, and likely came from the older English word noddle.

== History ==
=== Origin ===
The oldest physical evidence of noodles was from 4,000 years ago in China. In 2005, a team of archaeologists reported finding an earthenware bowl that contained 4,000-year-old noodles at the Lajia archaeological site, made by the Qijia culture. These noodles were said to resemble lamian, a type of Chinese noodle. Analyzing the husk phytoliths and starch grains present in the sediment associated with the noodles, they were identified as millet belonging to Panicum miliaceum and Setaria italica. However, other researchers cast doubt that Lajia's noodles were made from specifically millet: it is difficult to make pure millet noodles, it is unclear whether the analyzed residue were directly derived from Lajia's noodles themselves, starch morphology after cooking shows distinctive alterations that does not fit with Lajia's noodles, and it is uncertain whether the starch-like grains from Laijia's noodles are starch as they show some non-starch characteristics. The earliest written record of noodles is found in a book dated to the Eastern Han period (25–220 CE). Noodles made from wheat dough became a prominent food for the people of the Han dynasty.

Serventi and Sabban, in Pasta: The Story of a Universal Food, noted that wheat-based pasta traditions were established in China long before they had appeared in Europe. Food historian Gil Marks documented that the practise of boiling strips of dough in water originated in China and that this tradition did not take hold in Europe until the medieval period. Previously, European dough recipes were generally baked or fried rather than boiled, with Moorish Spain being the exception. Marks wrote that noodles spread from China along the Silk Road to Central Asia and reached Persia by around the fourth century. The noodles through Arab influence spread westwards to Sicily and Spain from where they spread from Sicily to mainland Italy sometime after the tenth century.

A homogenous mixture of flour and water called itrion was described by 2nd-century Greek physician Galen. The Jerusalem Talmud describes itrium among Jews between the 3rd and 5th centuries; itriyya (an Arabic borrowing from Greek) referred to string-like shapes made of semolina and dried before cooking, as defined by the 9th-century physician and lexicographer Isho bar Ali. According to National Geographic, many Italian writers have insisted pasta was enjoyed in pre-Roman Italy because implements found in a tomb dated to the fourth century BC show some resemblance to pasta-making equipment. However, many food historians dispute this interpretation, point out the scarcity of Roman-era references to anything resembling pasta, and believe that the dish instead first arrived in Italy as a "result of extensive Mediterranean trading in the Middle Ages". References to pasta dishes only became increasingly frequent across the Italian peninsula starting in the 13th century.

=== Historical variations ===
==== East Asia ====
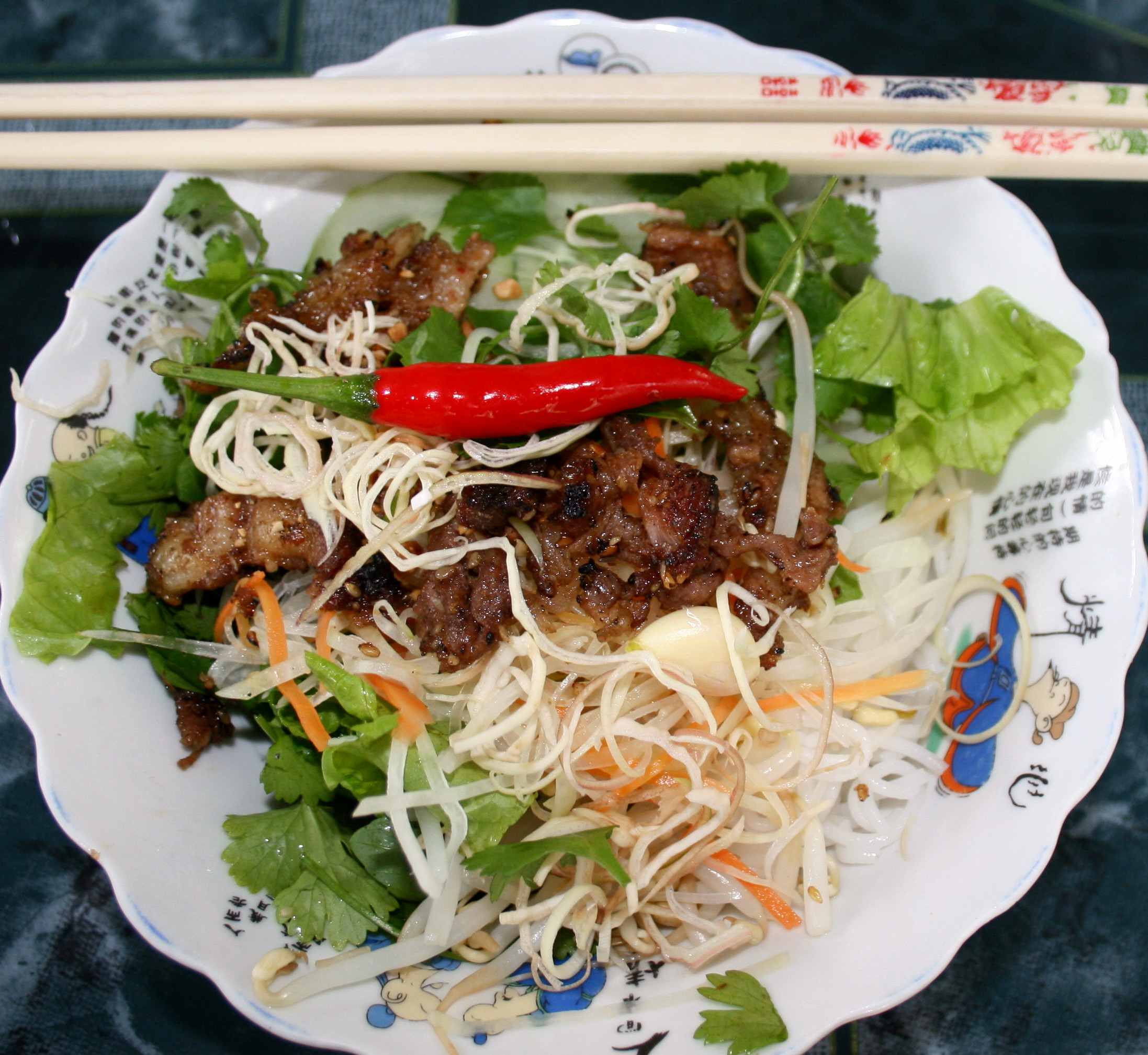
A bowl of Bún thịt nướng, a Vietnamese dish with rice noodles

There are over 1,200 types of noodles commonly consumed in China today. They vary widely according to the region of production, ingredients, shape or width, and manner of preparation. Due to the vast diversity of Chinese noodles, there is no single Chinese word equivalent to the Western concept of "noodles," nor is the notion of "noodles" as a unified food category recognized within Chinese cuisine.

In Standard Mandarin, miàn (simplified Chinese: 面; traditional Chinese: 麵) means "dough" but can be used to refer to noodles made from wheat flour and grains such as millet, sorghum, and oats. Similarly, fěn (粉) means "powder" but can be used to refer to noodles made from other starches, particularly rice flour and mung bean starch.

Wheat noodles in Japan (udon) were adapted from a Chinese recipe as early as the 9th century. Innovations continued, such as noodles made with buckwheat (naengmyeon) were developed in the Joseon Dynasty of Korea (1392–1897). Ramen noodles, based on southern Chinese noodle dishes from Guangzhou but named after the northern Chinese lamian, became common in Japan after World War II.

==== Central Asia ====
Kesme or erişte noodles were eaten by Turkic peoples by the 13th century.

==== West Asia ====
Ash reshteh (noodles in thick soup with herbs) is one of the most popular dishes in some middle eastern countries such as Iran.

The Latinized word itrium referred to a kind of boiled dough. Arabs adapted noodles for long journeys in the fifth century, the first written record of dry pasta. Muhammad al-Idrisi wrote in 1154 that itriyya was manufactured and exported from Norman Sicily. Itriyya was also known by the Persian Jews during early Persian rule (when they spoke Aramaic) and during Islamic rule. It referred to a small soup noodle, of Greek origin, prepared by twisting bits of kneaded dough into shape, resembling Italian orzo.

==== Europe ====
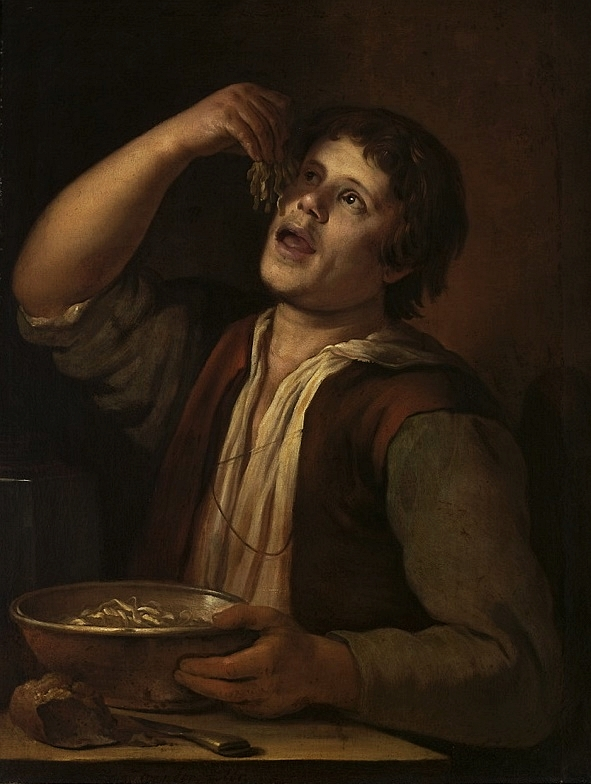
Jan Vermeer van Utrecht's painting of a man eating unspecified noodles (National Museum, Warsaw)

In the 1st century BCE, Horace wrote of fried sheets of dough called lagana. However, the cooking method does not correspond to the current definition of either a fresh or dry pasta product.

==== Italy ====
Some Italian writers argued that pasta in Italy dates back to fourth century BC in the Etruscan civilization. However modern historians dispute this claim and believe the first noodles were imported much later from the Arabs during the Middle Ages. Jeffrey Steingarten asserts that Moors had introduced pasta in the Emirate of Sicily in the 9th century. Historian Gil Marks documented in Encyclopedia of Jewish Food that pasta had subsequently spread from Sicily to mainland Italy sometime after the tenth century. Likewise, food historians Françoise Sabban and Massimo Montanari noted in Pasta: The Story of a Universal Food that the first noodles to appear in Italy occurred in the 10th or 11th centuries.

There is a legend about Marco Polo bringing the first pasta back from China however this is considered a myth by many historians. By the time Marco Polo has traveled to China during the Yuan dynasty in the late 13th century, pasta-like foods had already been well established in Italy.

==== Germany ====
In Germany, documents dating from 1725 mention Spätzle. Medieval illustrations are believed to place this noodle at an even earlier date.

==== Armenia ====
An Armenian variety of noodle, Arishta, is prepared from wheat, water and salt. It is thick and is usually eaten with matzoon, clarified butter and garlic.

===== Polish Jews =====
Zacierki is a type of noodle found in Polish Jewish cuisine. It was part of the rations distributed to Jewish victims in the Łódź Ghetto by the Nazis. (Out of the "major ghettos", Łódź was the most affected by hunger, starvation and malnutrition-related deaths.) The diary of a young Jewish girl from Łódź recounts a fight she had with her father over a spoonful of zacierki taken from the family's meager supply of 200 grams a week.

== Types by primary ingredient ==
=== Wheat ===
- Arishta: Armenian thick noodles made from wheat, salt and water combined into stiff dough.
- Bakmi: Indonesian Chinese yellow wheat noodles with egg and meat, usually pork. The Chinese word bak (肉), which means "meat" (or more specifically pork), is the vernacular pronunciation in Hokkien, but not in Teochew (which pronounced it as nek), suggesting an original Hokkien root. Mi derives from miàn. In Chinese, miàn (simplified Chinese: 面; traditional Chinese: 麵; often transliterated as "mien" or "mein") refers to noodles made from wheat.
- Chūka men (中華麺): Japanese for "Chinese noodles", used for ramen, champon, and yakisoba
- Kesme: flat, yellow or reddish brown Central Asian wheat noodles
- Kalguksu (칼국수): knife-cut Korean noodles
- Lamian (拉麵): hand-pulled Chinese noodles
- Mee pok (麪薄): flat, yellow Chinese noodles, common in Southeast Asia
- Long Pasta: Italian noodles typically made from durum wheat (semolina)
- Reshte: Central Asian, flat noodle, very pale in colour (almost white) used in Persian and Afghani cuisine
- Sōmen (そうめん): thin variety of Japanese wheat noodles, often coated with vegetable oil
- Thukpa (Tibetan: ཐུག་པ་, Wylie: thug pa): flat Tibetan noodles
- Udon (うどん): thicker variety of Japanese wheat noodles
- Kishimen (きしめん): flat variety of Japanese wheat noodles

=== Rice ===
- Bánh phở, thick fresh rice noodle used in popular Vietnamese phở noodles soup
- Flat or thick rice noodles, also known as hé fěn or ho fun (河粉), kway teow (粿條) or sen yai (เส้นใหญ่)
- Rice vermicelli: thin rice noodles, also known as mǐfěn (米粉) or bee hoon or sen mee (เส้นหมี่) or "bún"
- Sevai, a variant of rice vermicelli common in South India
- Idiyappam is an Indian rice noodle
- Mixian and migan noodles of southwest China
- Khanom chin is a fermented rice noodle used in Thai cuisine

=== Buckwheat ===
- Makguksu (막국수): local specialty of Gangwon Province in South Korea
- Memil naengmyeon (메밀 냉면): Korean noodles made of buckwheat, slightly more chewy than soba
- Soba (蕎麦): Japanese buckwheat noodles
- Pizzoccheri: Italian buckwheat tagliatelle from Valtellina, usually served with a melted cheese sauce

=== Egg ===
Egg noodles are made of a mixture of egg and flour.

- Youmian or thin noodles: Asian egg noodles common throughout China and Southeast Asia
- Lokshen: wide egg noodles used in Eastern European Jewish cuisine
- Kesme or erişte: Turkic egg noodles
- Spätzle: Egg noodle generally associated with the southern German states of Baden-Württemberg and Bavaria
- Certain egg-based long pasta, such as Tagliatelle, Fettuccine, and Pappardelle

=== Others ===
- Acorn noodles, also known as dotori guksu (도토리국수) in Korean, are made of acorn meal, wheat flour, wheat germ, and salt.
- Olchaeng-i guksu, meaning tadpole noodles, are made of corn soup put through a noodle maker right into cold water. It was named for its features. These Korean noodles are mostly eaten in Gangwon-do.
- Cellophane noodles are made from mung bean. These can also be made from potato starch, canna starch or various starches of the same genre.
- Chilk naengmyeon (칡 냉면): Korean noodles made of starch from kudzu root, known as kuzuko in Japanese, chewy and semitransparent.
- Shirataki noodles (しらたき): Japanese noodles made of konjac (devil's tongue).
- Kelp noodles, made from seaweed.
- Mie jagung, Indonesian noodles made from corn starch.
- Mie sagu, Indonesian noodles made from sagu.
- Mie singkong or mie mocaf, Indonesian noodles made from cassava.
- Mie porang, Indonesian noodles made from Amorphophallus muelleri.

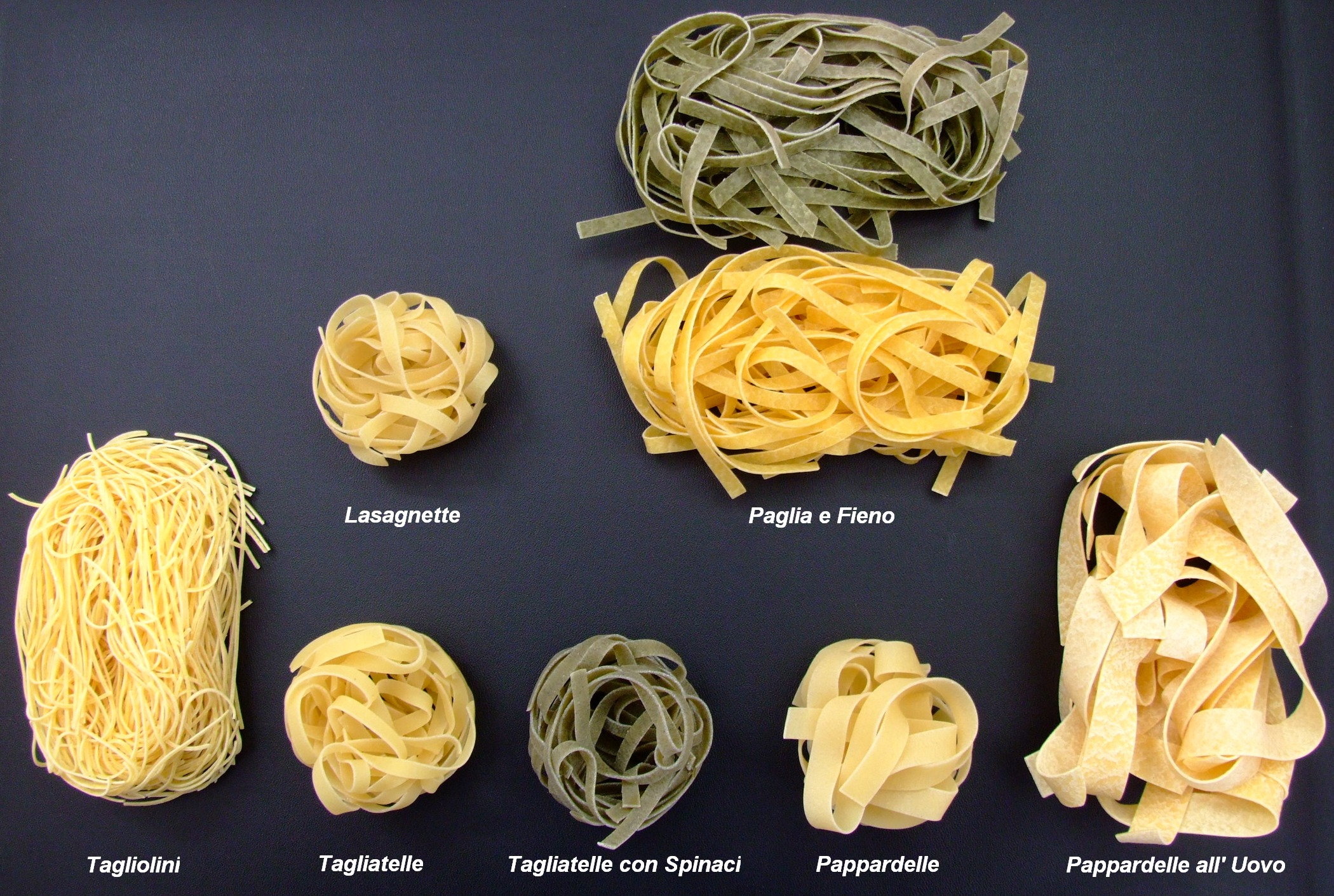
Egg pasta

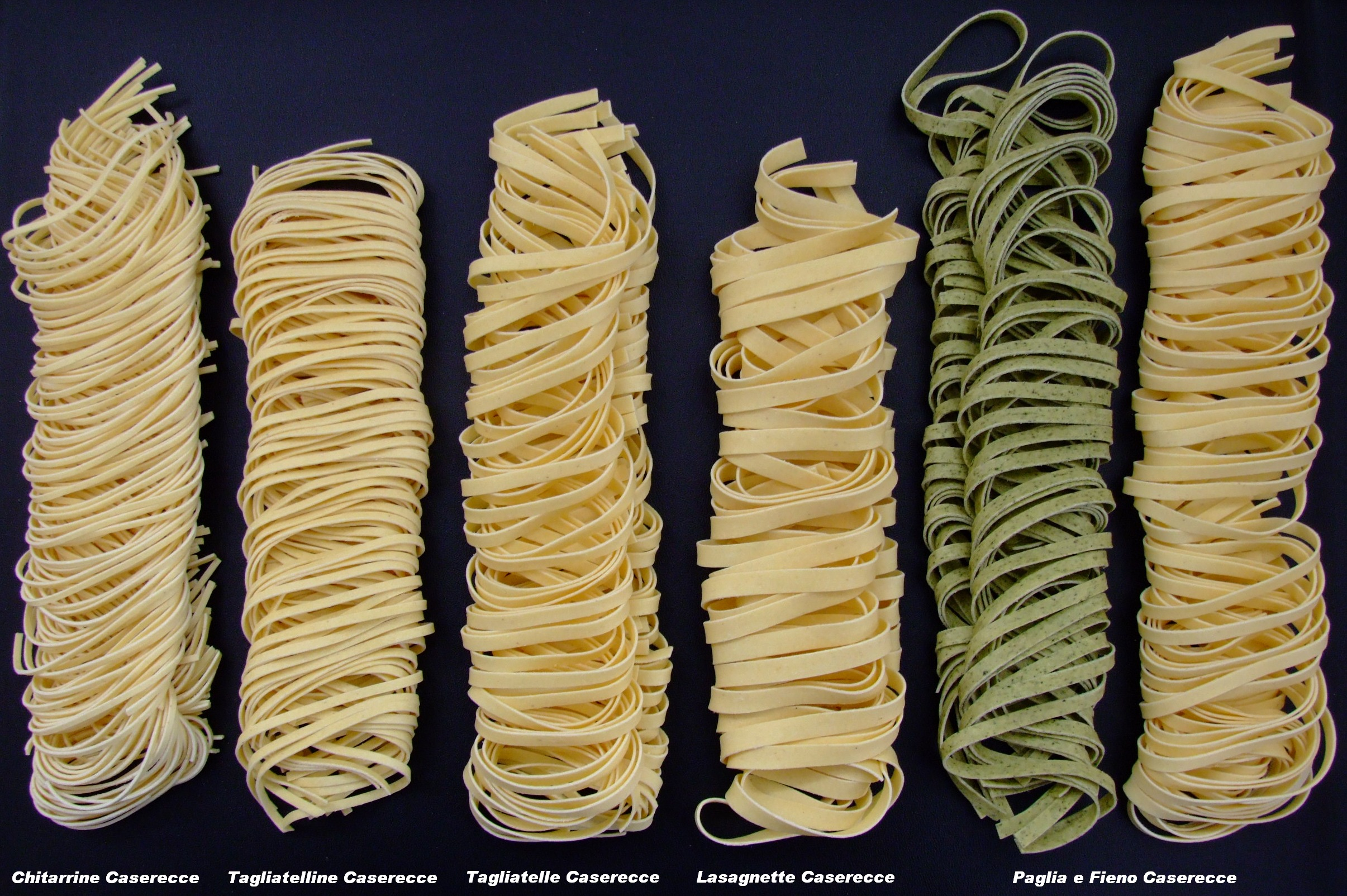
Fresh pasta

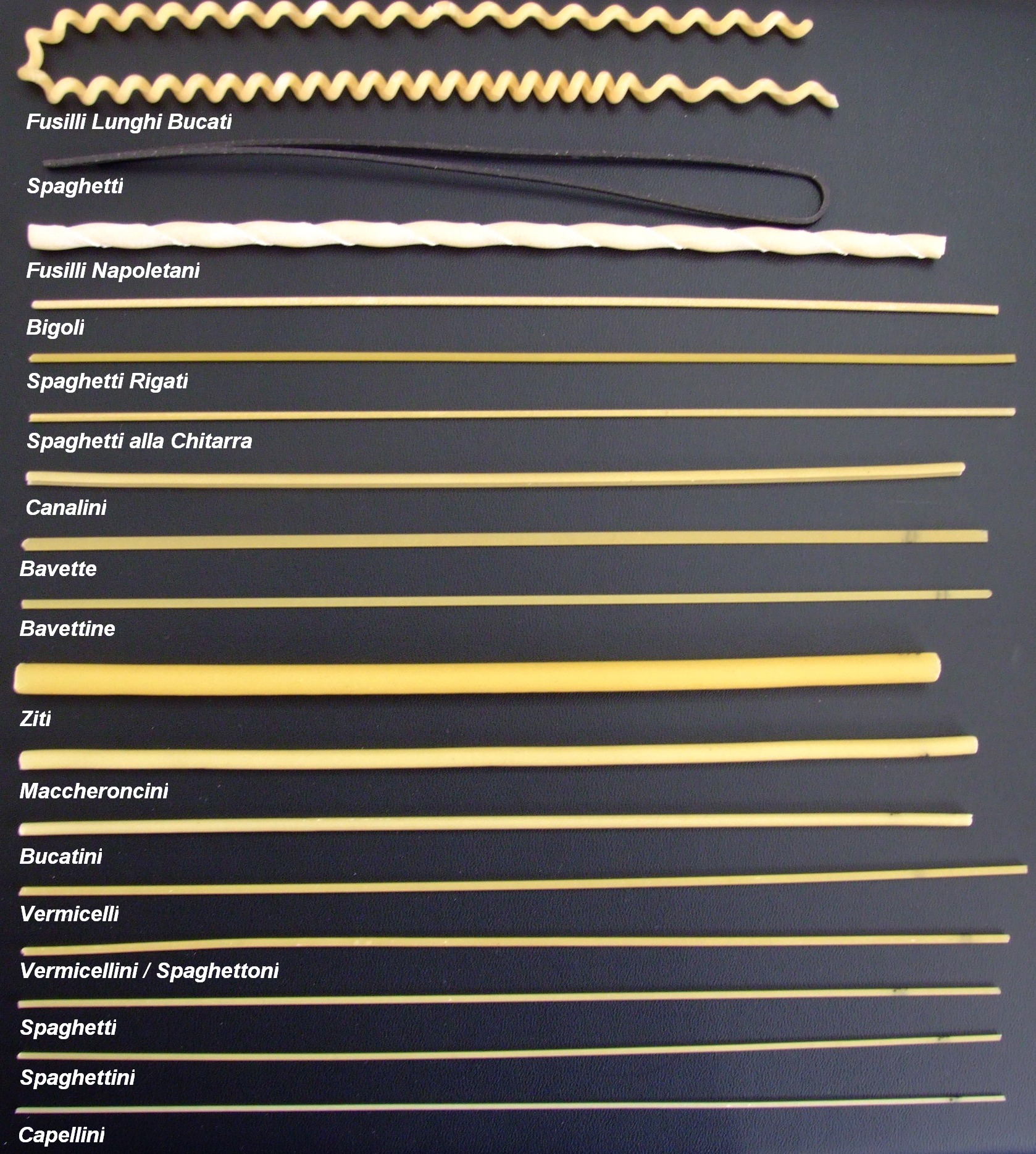
Long pasta

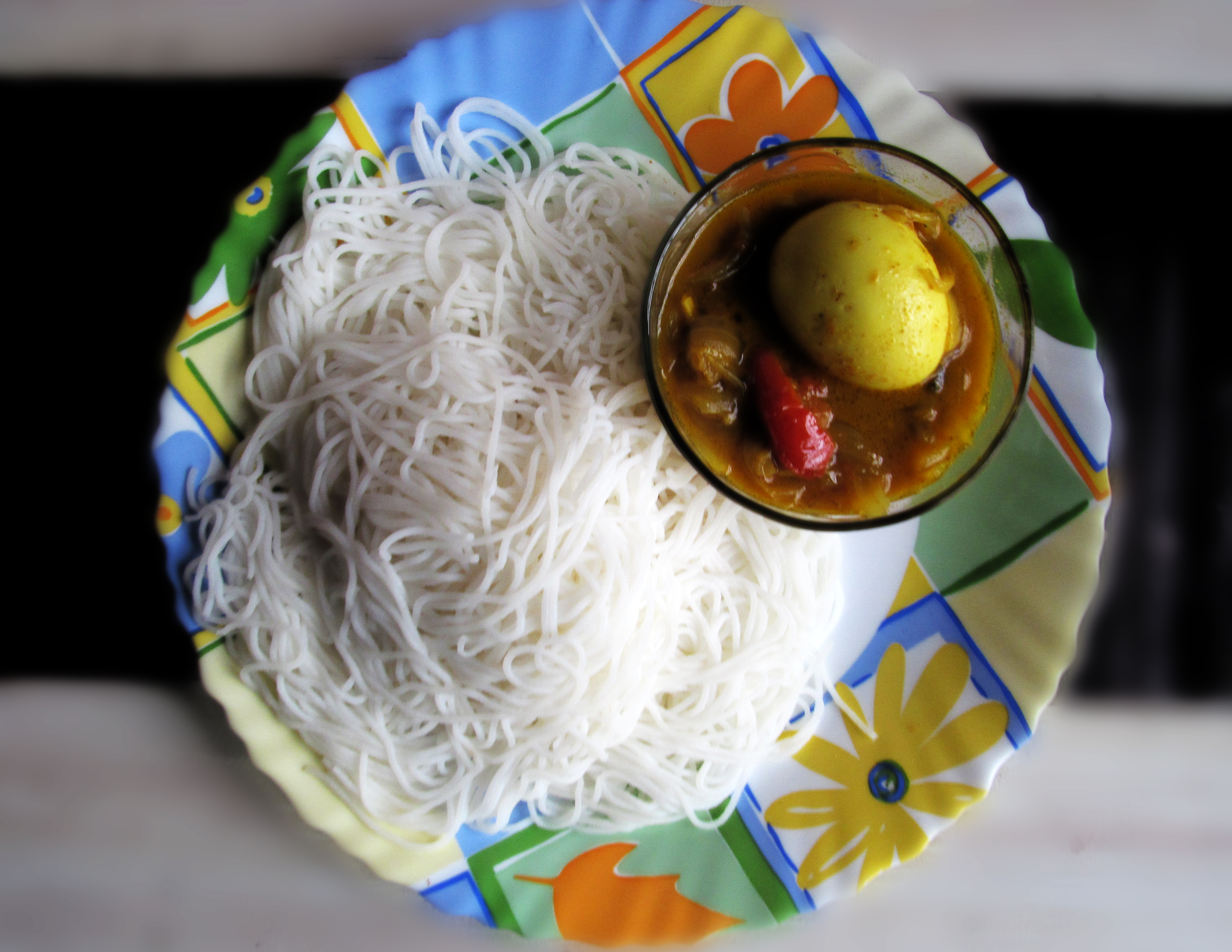
Idiyappam, Indian rice noodles

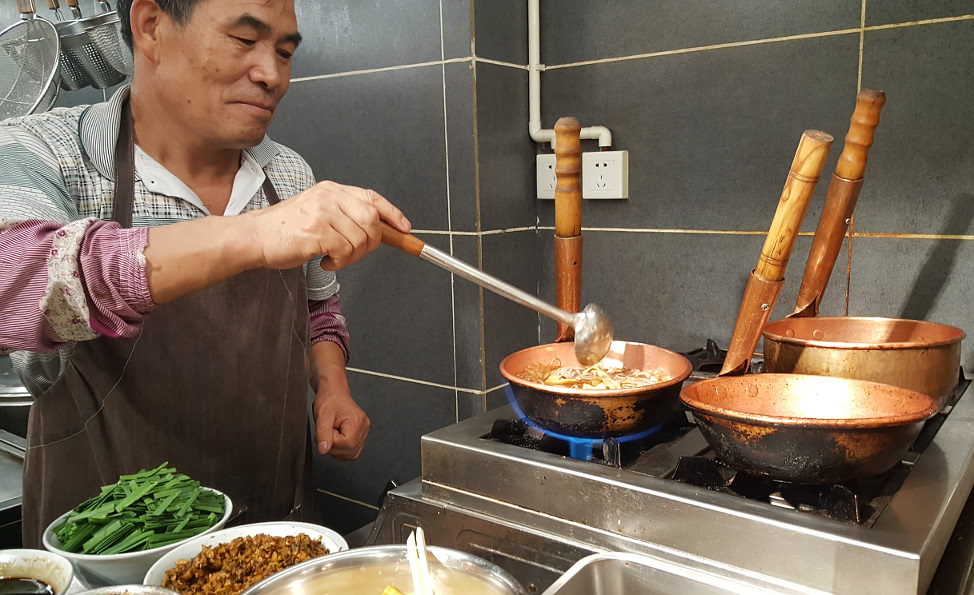
Mixian (米线) rice noodles being cooked in copper pots (铜锅), China

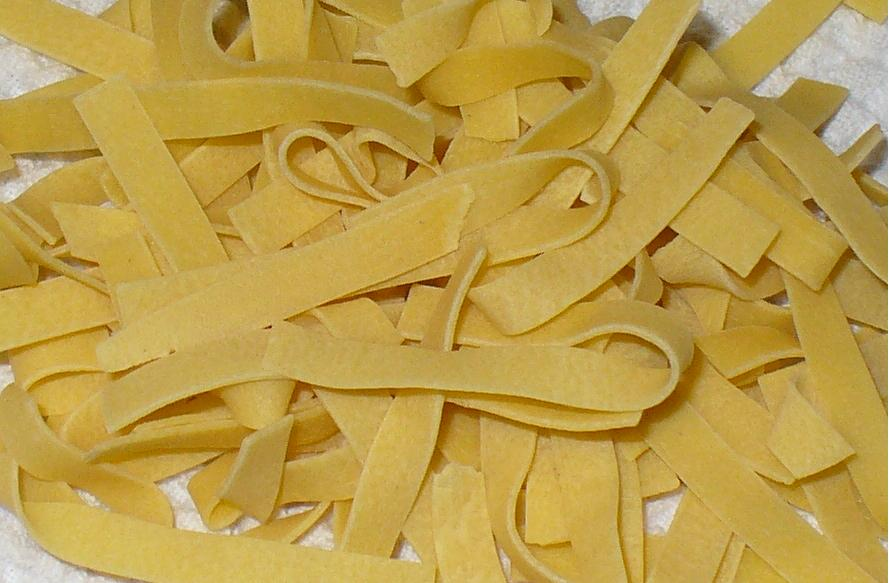
Wide, uncooked egg noodles

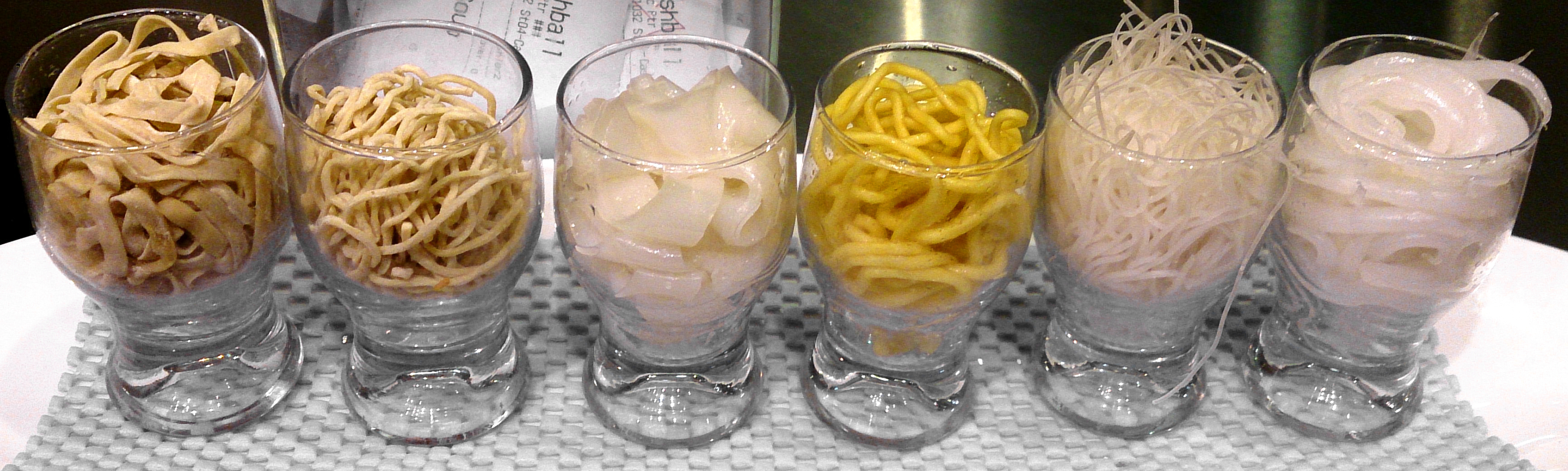
Some different types of noodles commonly found in Southeast Asia

== Types of dishes ==
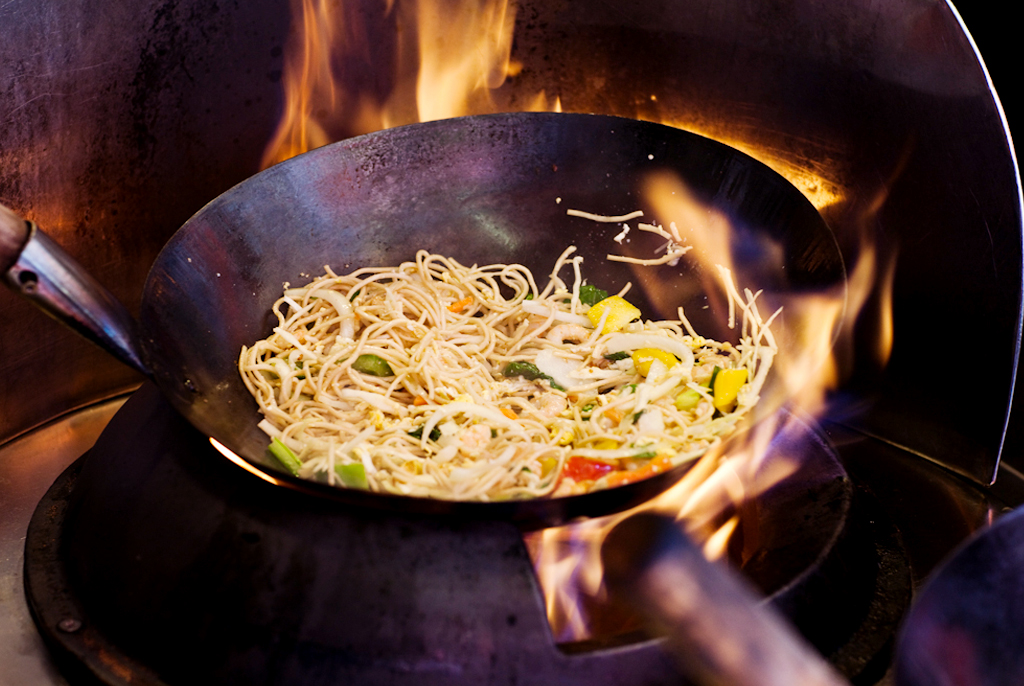
Stir-frying noodles using wok

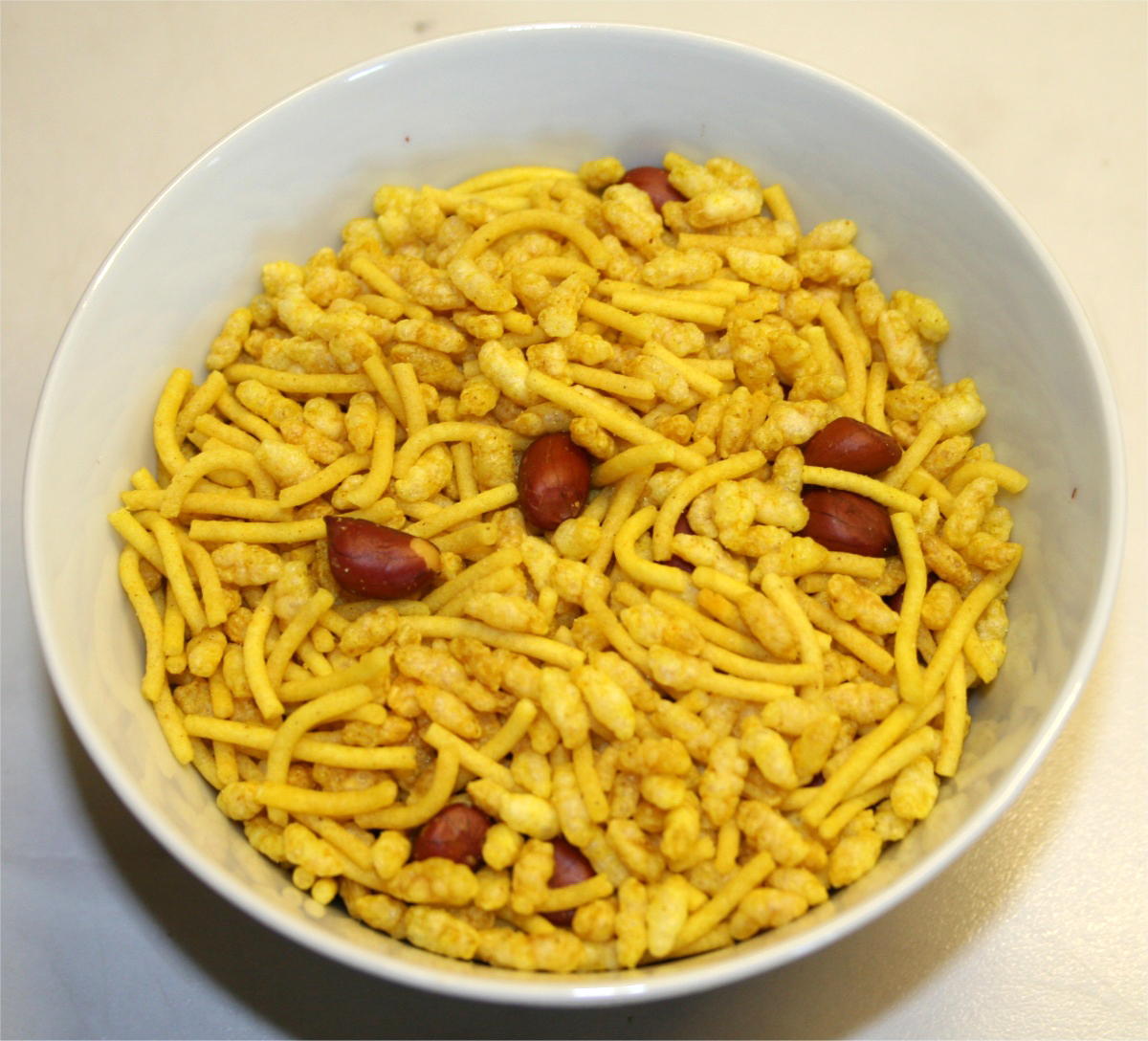
Sev mamra, an Indian snack

- Baked noodles: Boiled and drained noodles are combined with other ingredients and baked. Common examples include many casseroles.
- Basic noodles: These are cooked in water or broth, then drained. Other foods can be added or the noodles are added to other foods (see fried noodles) or the noodles can be served plain with a dipping sauce or oil to be added at the table. In general, noodles are soft and absorb flavors.
- Chilled noodles: noodles that are served cold, sometimes in a salad. Examples include Thai glass noodle salad and cold udon.
- Fried noodles: dishes made of noodles stir fried with various meats, seafood, vegetables, and dairy products. Examples include chow mein, lo mein, mie goreng, hokkien mee, some varieties of pancit, yakisoba, tallarín saltado, and pad thai.
- Noodle soup: noodles served in broth. Examples include phở, beef noodle soup, chicken noodle soup, ramen, laksa, mie ayam, saimin, and batchoy.

== Preservation ==
- Instant noodles
- Frozen noodles

== See also ==
- Chinese noodles
- Filipino pancit
- Italian pasta
- Japanese noodles
- Korean noodles
- Vietnamese noodles
- Cold noodles
- List of noodle restaurants

== Bibliography ==
- Dickie, John (1 October 2010). Delizia! The Epic History of Italians and Their Food (Paper). New York: Atria Books. ISBN 0743278070.
- Errington, Frederick et al. eds. The Noodle Narratives: The Global Rise of an Industrial Food into the Twenty-First Century (U. of California Press; 2013) 216 pages; studies three markets for instant noodles: Japan, the United States, and Papua New Guinea.
- Rodinson, Maxime; Perry, Charles; Arberry, Arthur J. (2001). Medieval Arab Cookery (Hardback). United Kingdom: Prospect Books. p. 253. ISBN 0907325912.
- Serventi, Silvano; Sabban, Françoise (2002). Pasta: the Story of a Universal Food. New York: Columbia University Press. ISBN 0231124422.
- Sinclair, Thomas R.; Sinclair, Carol Janas (2010). Bread, beer, and the seeds of change: Agriculture's imprint on world history. Wallingford: CABI. p. 91. ISBN 978-1-84593-704-1.
