= Yunnan cuisine =

Culinary traditions of Yunnan

- Traditional Chinese: 雲南菜
- Simplified Chinese: 云南菜
Transcriptions
Standard Mandarin
- Hanyu Pinyin: Yúnnán cài

Dian cuisine
- Chinese: 滇菜
Transcriptions
Standard Mandarin
- Hanyu Pinyin: Diān cài

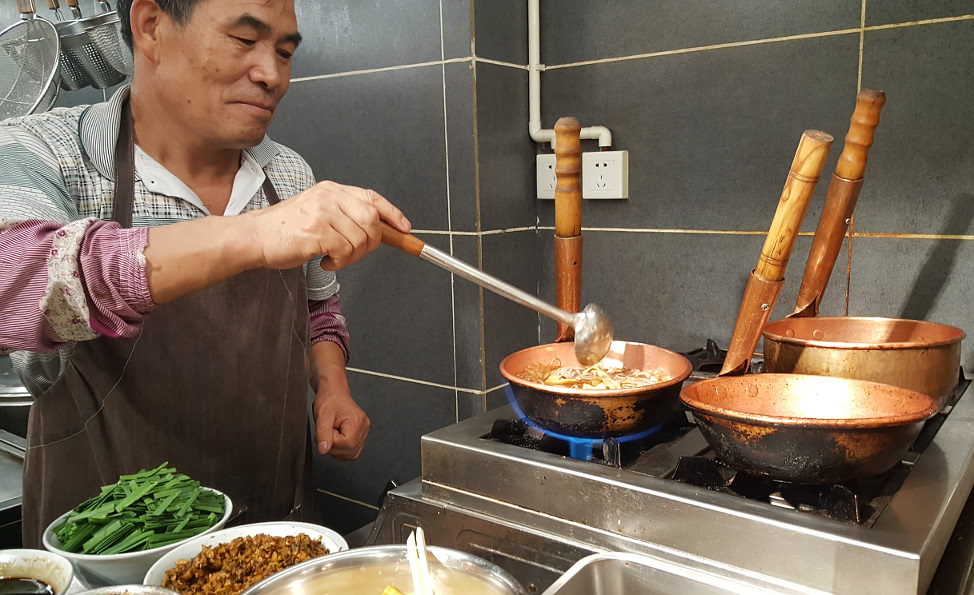
Mixian (rice noodles) being cooked in copper pots on gas stoves at a restaurant in Kunming.

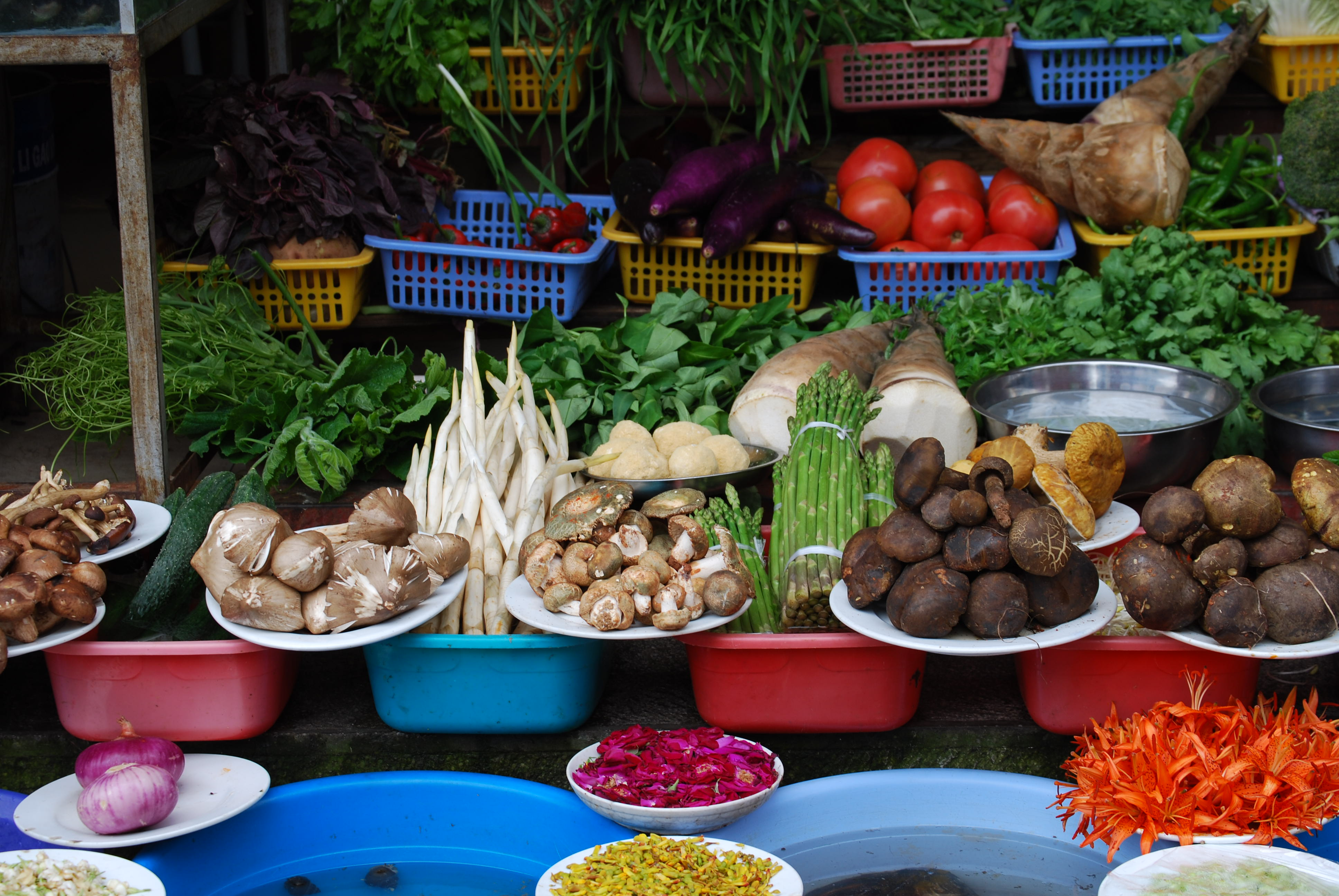
Ingredients used for dishes in Yunnan cuisine

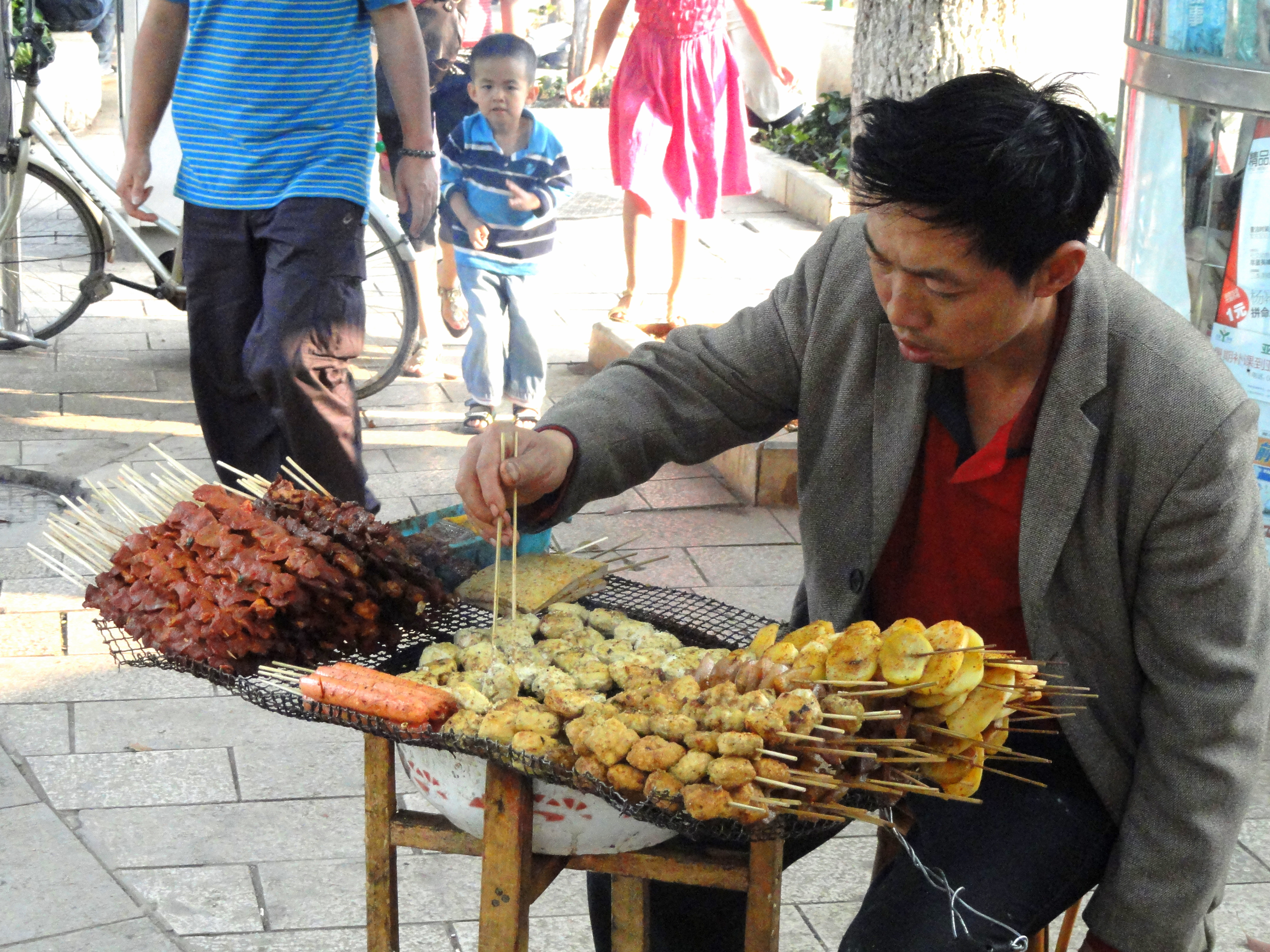
Street barbeque vendor in Kunming. Jianshui tofu is at the centre. Clockwise from top: Shiping tofu, potato skewers, Jianshui tofu skewers, processed meat sticks, probably beef skewers (often fatty) and another type of meat.

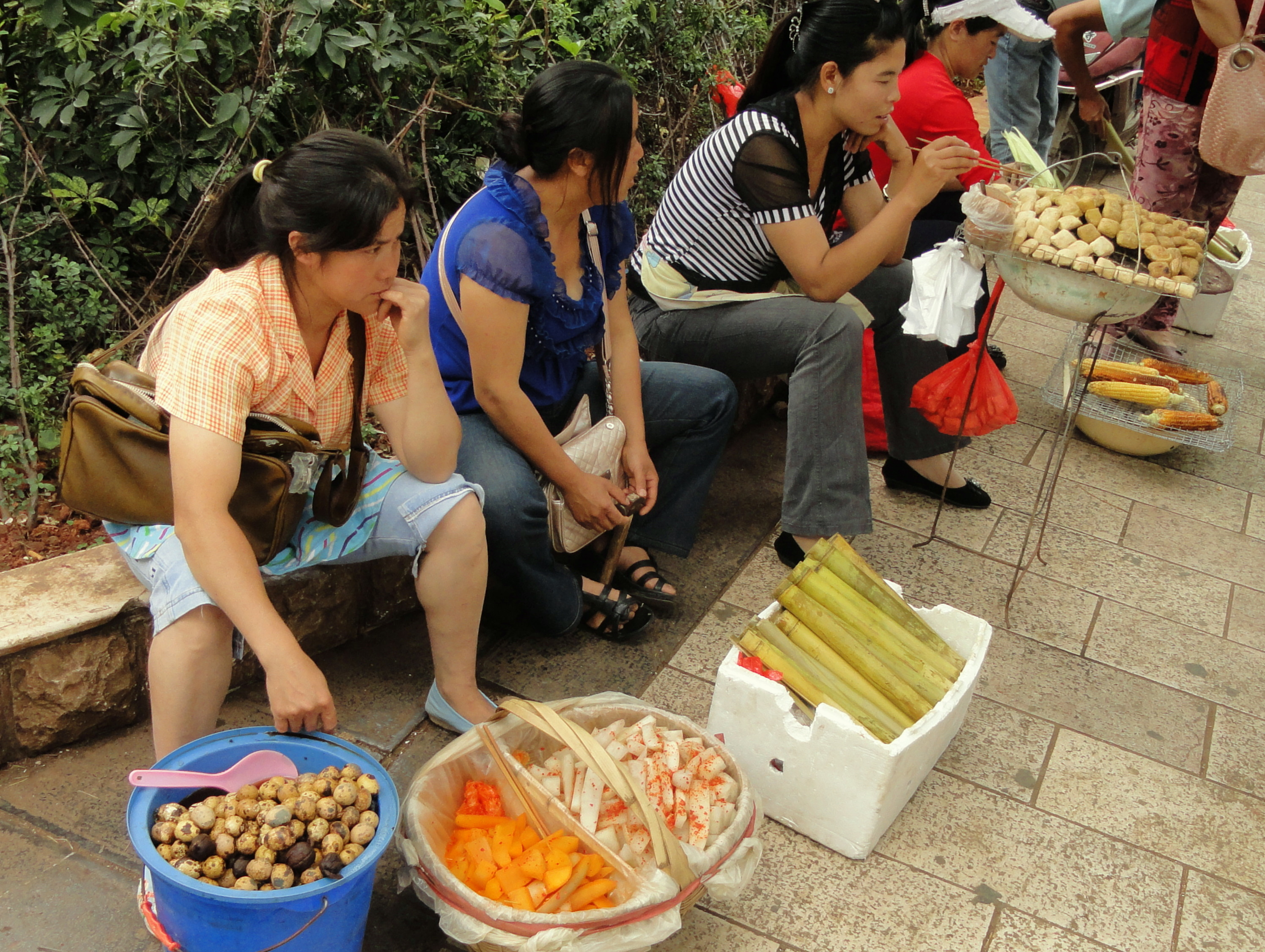
Street vendors. From bottom left: quail eggs, two types of vinegar-preserved vegetables (probably radish), bamboo rice (竹饭 zhufan), barbequed Jianshui tofu, roasted corn.

Yunnan cuisine, alternatively known as Dian cuisine, is an amalgam of the cuisines of Han Chinese and other ethnic minority groups in Yunnan province in southwestern China. As the province with the largest number of ethnic minority groups, Yunnan cuisine is vastly varied, and it is difficult to make generalisations. Many Yunnan dishes are quite spicy, and mushrooms are featured prominently. Flowers, ferns, algae and insects may also be eaten. The cuisine of Yunnan is often compared to the cuisine of Southeast Asia as the province borders the region and many of the ethnic minorities or related cultural groups also have a presence in Southeast Asia.

Three of the province's most famous products are the renowned Pu'er tea, which was traditionally grown in Ning'er; Xuanwei ham, which is often used to flavour stewed and braised foods in Chinese cuisine and for making the stocks and broths of many Chinese soups; and guoqiao (crossing the bridge), a rice noodle soup with chicken, pig's kidney and liver, fish and pickled pork.

Yunnan cuisine is unique in China for its cheeses like Rubing and Rushan cheese made by the Bai people. Other influences include Mongolian influence during the Yuan dynasty (i.e. Central Asian settlement in Yunnan), and the proximity and influence of India and Tibet on Yunnan. Yunnan cuisine is gaining popularity in the west. Likening the food vlogger Dianxi Xiaoge to the Chinese documentary television series A Bite of China, Xinhua said Dianxi Xiaoge could be called A Bite of Yunnan in introducing Yunnan cuisine to the world.

== Notable dishes ==
Image	English	Traditional Chinese	Simplified Chinese	Pinyin	Origin	Description
	Baba	粑粑	粑粑	bābā	Naxi	A thick, round and heavy bread, either prepared plain or with various fillings.
	Banana flower	芭蕉花	芭蕉花	bājiāo huā	Dai/Zhuang people	The heart of the banana flower. Frequently eaten roasted in banana leaves on an open barbecue, but also stir-fried.
	Pineapple rice	菠蘿飯	菠萝饭	bōluó fàn	Dai people	Pineapple rice. It is found in Xishuangbanna and other areas populated by Dai people.
	Erkuai	餌塊	饵块	ěrkuài	Bai people (Dali Prefecture)	Highly refined and compressed rice cakes.
	Crossing-the-bridge noodles	過橋米線	过桥米线	guò qiáo mǐxiàn	Han Chinese	Literally means "crossing-the-bridge noodles" or "across-the-bridge noodles". It is Yunnan's best-known dish. It typically consists of a bowl of boiling chicken soup, to which diners add their own selection of thin meat slices, mixian, vegetables and spices, much like a hot pot. It is ubiquitous throughout the province.
	Adzuki beans	紅豆	红豆	hóngdòu		Adzuki beans have been used in Yunnan for millennia. Earliest domesticated examples are known from tombs in Japan (4,000 BCE), then China and Korea (3,000 BCE). Genetic evidence indicates that the bean later crossbred with native species in the Himalayas, and Yunnan was probably exposed to the ingredient at the time. Frequently prepared fried with kale or mint.
	Jidou liangfen	雞豆涼粉	鸡豆凉粉	jīdòu liángfěn	Naxi people (Lijiang)	A savoury jelly made from gram flour.
	Juecai	蕨菜	蕨菜	juécài	In high altitudes, often the first green growth in spring.	Immature fronds of bracken ferns, such as osmunda japonica. Stir-fried or in soup.
	Granny's potato	老奶洋芋	老奶洋芋	lǎonǎi yángyù		A local mashed potato style dish consisting of steamed potato mashed and typically flavoured with spring onions, pickled mustard greens, and chilli.
	Lufu	滷腐	卤腐	lǔfǔ	Northern China, via the Mongols (during the Yuan dynasty)	A type of fermented beancurd, typically used as a condiment or made into sauces, often used on erkuai. It is reddish-yellow in colour, with a soft texture and a savoury flavour.
	Migan / Mixian	米干 / 米線	米干 / 米线	mǐgàn / mǐxiàn	Dai people / Han Chinese	Fresh Yunnanese rice noodles, typically served either in a soup of broth or stir-fried.
	Nanpie	喃撇		nanpiě	Dai people.	Sauce-like dish made with fresh ingredients and spices.
	Peanuts	花生	花生	huāshēng	Re-introduction?	Eaten fried as a condiment, as a component in fried noodles, cold noodles, noodle soups, stir-fries and fried rice.
	Pu'er tea	普洱茶	普洱茶	pǔ'ěr chá	Han Chinese (Ning'er)	Famous dark tea that had gained popularity worldwide for its health benefits.
	Steam pot chicken	氣鍋雞	气锅鸡	qì guō jī	Han Chinese (Jianshui)	Literally means "steam pot chicken". It consists of chicken steamed with tonics and herbs in a ceramic pot.
	Rubing	乳餅	乳饼	rǔbǐng	Bai people (Dali Prefecture)	Cheese made from goat's milk.
	Rushan	乳扇	乳扇	rǔshān	Bai people (Dali Prefecture)	Cheese made from cow's milk.
	Shiping tofu	石屏豆腐	石屏豆腐	shípíng dòufǔ	Han Chinese via the Mongols (Shiping)	Traditional bean curd made in Shiping County, dating from the Yuan dynasty.
	Xuanwei ham	宣威腿	宣威腿	Xuānwēi tuǐ	Han Chinese (Qujing)	Traditional ham made in Xuanwei, a county-level city in Qujing. It dates from the Ming dynasty.
	Yiliang roast duck	宜良烤鴨	宜良烤鸭	yíliáng kǎoyā	Han Chinese (Yiliang)	A crispy skin roast duck similar to Peking duck, but honey is used to crisp and colour the skin. It is roasted with pine branches and needles, which impart a unique flavour to the dish.
	Zhe'ergen	折耳根	折耳根	zhé'ěrgēn	Yelang	An edible rhizome with a fresh, spicy and peppery flavour. The leaves are also eaten.
	Da jiu-jia	大救駕	大救驾		Tengchong	Chinese stir-fry that consists of Erkuai cut into thin slices before being fried with pork, egg, soy sauce, and vegetables
	Crisp stuffed bun	破酥包	破酥包	pòsūbāo	Han Chinese	A lard-layered bun with pork, lard, bamboo shoot, and soy sauce; or with the filling of Yunnan ham and white sugar or brown sugar. Poshu Bun was created by a chef from Yuxi almost a hundred years ago.

== Characteristic features ==
=== Abundant ecological raw materials ===
Yunnan is located in the Yunnan-Guizhou plateau, with an extended range of mountains, plains, and lakes, forming a colorful scenery and three-dimensional climate of tropical, subtropical, temperate, and cold zones. This kind of diverse physiognomy and environment are beneficial to the growth of a variety of plants and animals. Yunnan is known as the "fungus kingdom," "plant kingdom," and "animal kingdom." It is one of the regions with the most abundant edible wild fungus resources in China. There are more than 250 kinds of edible native fungus, among which common ones are bovine liver fungus, Qingtou fungus, chicken fir fungus, dried fungus, bamboo sun fungus, matsutake fungus and so on.

=== Unique cooking technique ===
The cooking technique is an essential factor in cooking dishes. Many dishes are unique in their varied use of cooking utensils, fire, flavors, and colors. Yunnan is known for its diversity and ethnic minorities. The ancient cooking methods of 25 ethnic minorities found in Yunnan are merging with the cooking techniques of the Han nationality, which makes Yunnan cuisine uniquely flavorsome and colorful. In the province, the Han peoples' techniques of steaming, frying, sautéeing (with starch extract), braising, quick-boiling, boiling, and stewing are melding with the methods of minority techniques of baking, grinding with mortar and pestle, heat-contact, curing, cooking on stone, preserving with salt and other cooking methods.

For example:

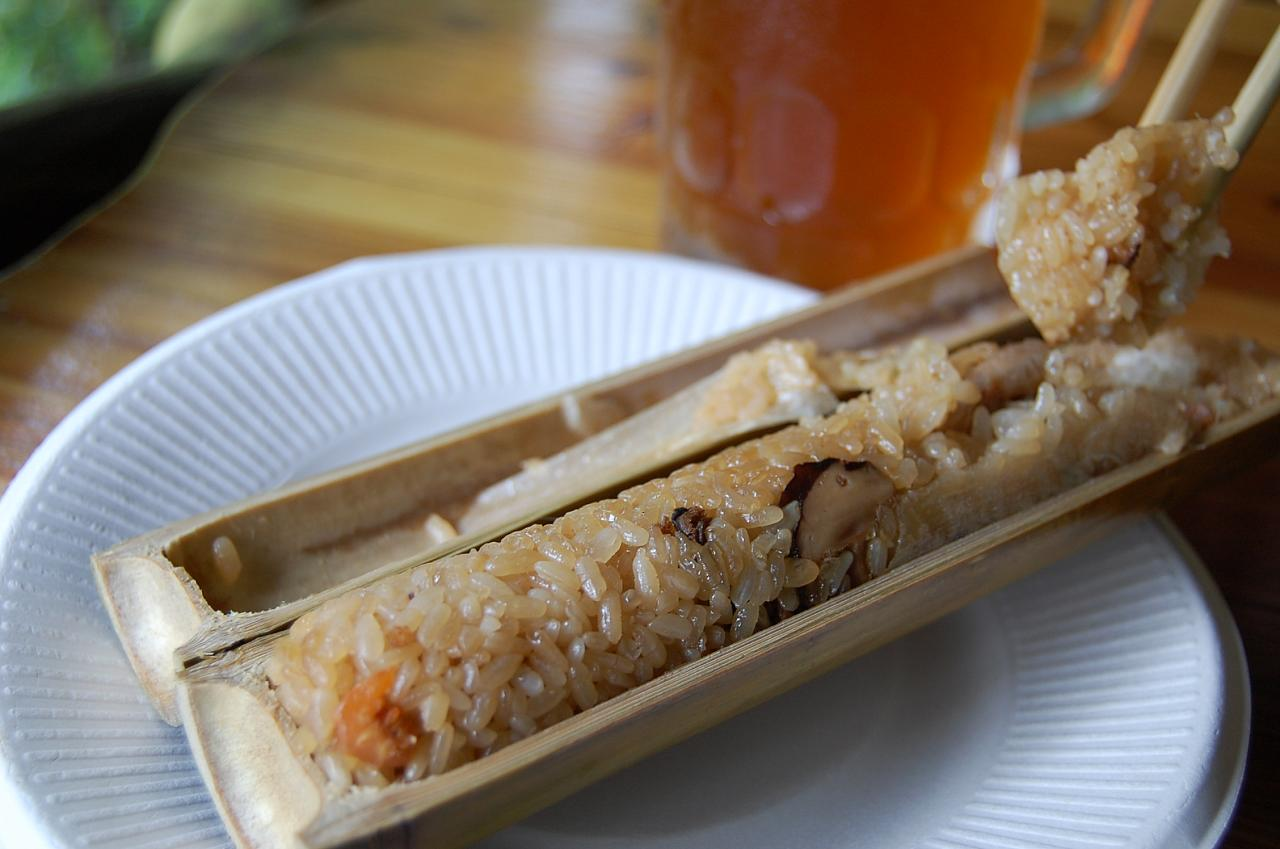
Bamboo rice

- Bamboo rice: Adding glutinous rice into bamboo to make bamboo rice with soft and glutinous fragrance.
- Pineapple rice: Pineapple purple rice made with hollowed pineapple with fragrant pineapple flavor.
- Steamed chicken: Steamed chicken made with Jianshui purple pottery special steam cooker with original flavor.

== See also ==
- List of Chinese dishes
- List of edible insects by country
- Mexican cuisine, which has a lot of similarities with Yunnan cuisine
