= Crossing-the-bridge noodles =

Rice noodle soup from Yunnan, China

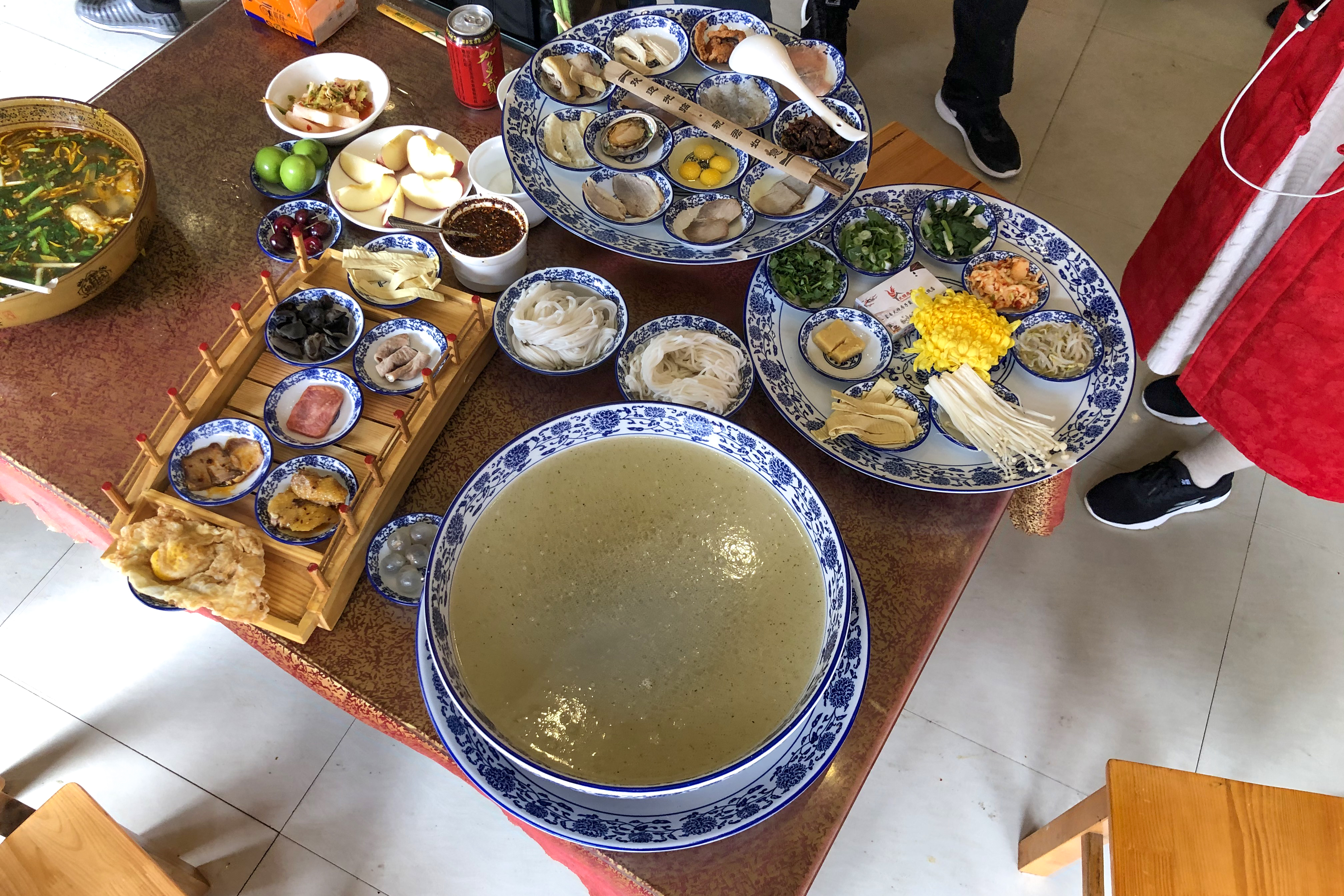
- Traditional Chinese: 過橋米線
- Simplified Chinese: 过桥米线
- Literal meaning: Cross bridge rice noodles
- Hanyu Pinyin: guòqiáo mǐxiàn
- Yale Romanization: gwo kìuh máih sin
- Jyutping: gwo3 kiu4 mai5 sin3

Crossing-the-bridge noodles is a rice noodle soup that originates from Yunnan province of China. It is one of the best-known dishes in Yunnan cuisine.

== Description ==
Crossing-the-bridge noodles has over a century of history and has been listed as an intangible cultural heritage of Kunming since 2008. The dish is served with a large bowl of boiling hot broth and soup. The soup is made with chicken, pork bone and seasoning, such as Chinese star anise and ginger. A layer of chicken fat is also used to insulate the soup and keep it warm for longer. These ingredients are separated. The soup ingredients are served on a cutting board or plate and include raw vegetables and lightly cooked meats. Common ingredients include thin slices of ham, chunks of chicken, chicken skin, strips of bean curd sheets, chives, sprouts, and rice noodles. Once added into the broth, the ingredients cook quickly, with a layer of melted chicken fat and oil on top. The soup takes a few minutes to cook, and it is then spooned out into small bowls. Jim Thurman of LA Weekly writes that "with the rice noodles and fresh chicken, it's reminiscent of an extremely subtle version of Vietnamese phở gà (chicken pho). Which shouldn't surprise anyone, as Yunnan shares a border with Vietnam."

In Yunnan, various small shops sell crossing-the-bridge noodles that come to the table in large bowls already mixed. At these places, it is a quick, cheap, filling lunch type of food.

== Etymology ==
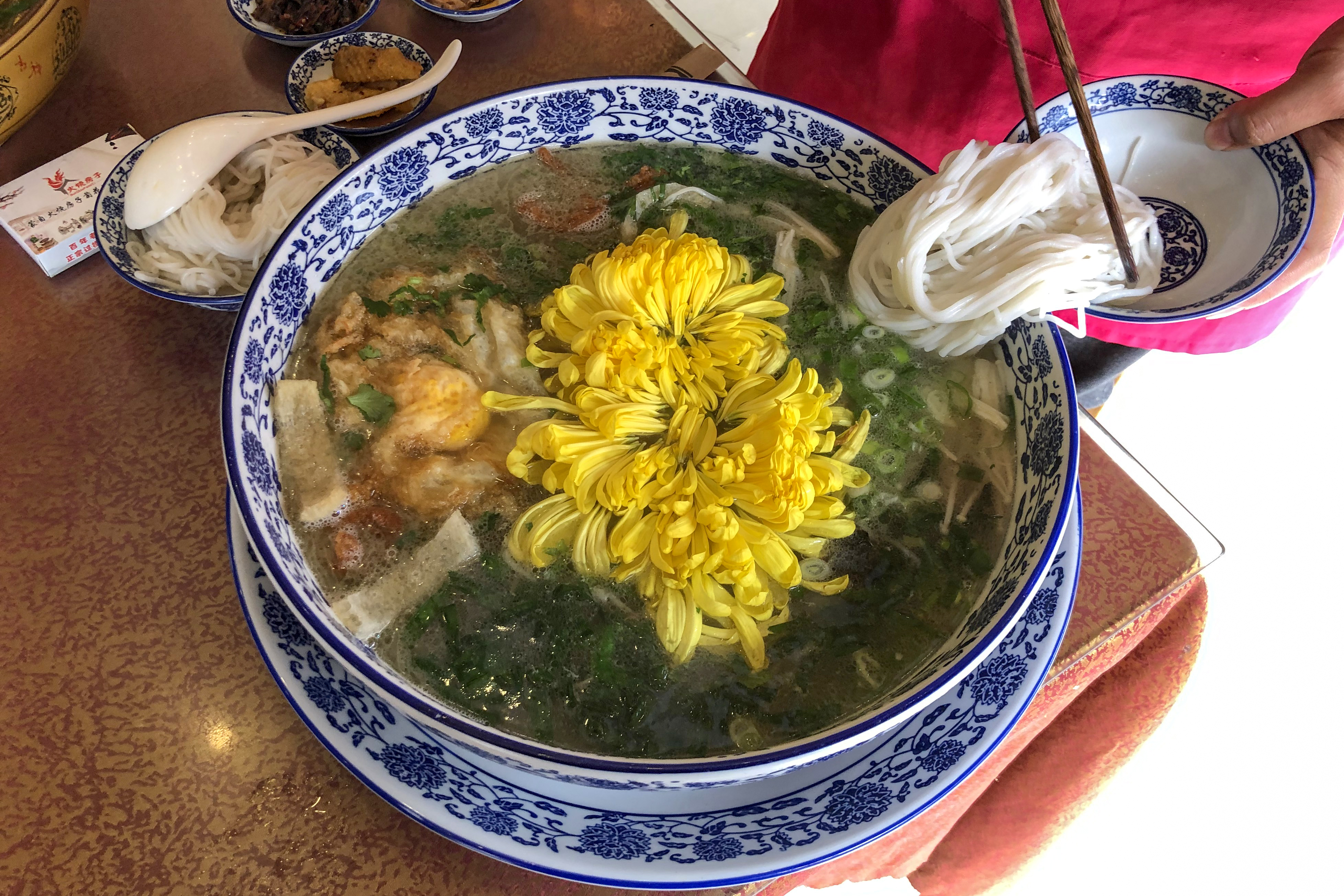
"Crossing the bridge" sometimes refers to transferring rice noodles into the soup bowl

According to Yunnan culinary tradition, crossing-the-bridge noodles (过桥米线, Guòqiáo mǐxiàn) originated during the Qing Dynasty (1644–1912) in Mengzi, Yunnan. The most common story that has gained traction begins with a scholar who was studying hard for his imperial exams on a small island. His wife, who would bring him food, found that by the time she had crossed the bridge to the island, the soup would be cold and the noodles were soggy. She then decided to load a large earthen pot with boiling broth with a layer of oil on top that would act as insulation and keep the broth warm. The noodles and other ingredients were kept in a separate container, and when she arrived, she mixed the two containers together for a warm soup. This narrative is frequently referenced in local media and tourism promotions as representative of Yunnan's cultural values.

=== Cultural significance ===
Crossing-the-bridge noodles hold deep cultural meaning in Yunnan Province. In 2008, the dish was officially listed as part of Kunming's intangible cultural heritage, recognizing its historical and social importance to the region. The designation highlights both the traditional preparation methods and the dish's role in Yunnan's culinary identity. Local governments have since used the noodles as a focus for cultural tourism initiatives, with annual food festivals and cooking competitions dedicated to preserving the tradition.

== Varieties ==
The main ingredient of the noodles is rice. Rice vermicelli production differs in different regions. In Kunming and Yunnan, there are two varieties: "dry paste" and "sour paste"; The production process differs depending on individual preferences and tastes: "Sour paste", as the name suggests, tastes a little sour, but is characterized by a relatively thick and soft rice noodle, whereas the "dry paste" does not have the sourness of the sour paste, and the noodle is relatively thin and more rigid. Older people in Kunming think the "sour paste" noodles are more authentic. Most people in Yunnan think the Kunming noodle does not satisfy their taste buds, and generally believe Mengzi County and Jianshui County makes better noodles. Mengzi and Jianshui counties are renowned for their noodle quality, differing from Kunming's versions.

As peoples' tastes have changed, all kinds of noodle varieties are flooding onto the market. Kunming people now do not necessarily pick a "dry paste" or "sour paste." At present, people prefer the more efficient, slippery "water-washed rice noodle" and "purple rice noodle", one that is mixed with purple rice.

== Status ==
The development of crossing-the-bridge noodles has changed people's eating habits over the years, especially breakfasts. Generally in street markets, the hot fresh rice noodles are put into a bowl of boiling water for about half a minute, and then colored sauce is added to the bowl. This is known as the "hat" of the sauce. Crossing-the-bridge noodles served in markets in the morning are usually completed in one minute.

There are a few franchised restaurants which serve more intricate or elaborate crossing-the-bridge noodle dishes.

== Ingredients ==
The general ingredients of the dish include raw quail eggs, ham slices, chicken slices, and various vegetables.

Crossing-the-bridge noodles consist of three main components: a piping-hot broth, thinly sliced raw ingredients, and pre-cooked rice noodles. The broth is traditionally prepared by simmering chicken, pork bones, and sometimes ham for several hours, infused with ginger, star anise, and other aromatics. A key feature is the layer of chicken fat floating atop the broth, which acts as insulation to retain heat until serving.

To assemble the dish, diners first add delicate proteins such as sliced chicken, pork, fish, or quail eggs to the broth, allowing them to cook in the residual heat. Vegetables like chrysanthemum greens, bean sprouts, and tofu are then introduced, followed by the rice noodles. The ingredients are typically served on separate plates to ensure freshness and allow customization.

Modern variations may include additional toppings like mushrooms, seafood, or offal, while some restaurants offer halal or vegetarian adaptations by substituting meat-based broths with mushroom or vegetable stock.

== See also ==
- List of Chinese soups
- List of noodle dishes
- List of snack foods
- List of soups
- Mixian (noodle)
