= Mixian =

Mixian may refer to:

- Mixian (noodle), a type of rice noodle from the Yunnan Province of China
- Xinmi, former name Mixian (Mi County), a city in Henann, China
