= Lufu =

Lufu may refer to:

- Lufu (food), a type of fermented bean curd
- Lufu language of Nigeria
- Lufu River or Luvo River, a river of Angola and the Democratic Republic of the Congo
- Loserfruit, Australian YouTuber
