= Erkuai =

Rice cake from Yunnan, China

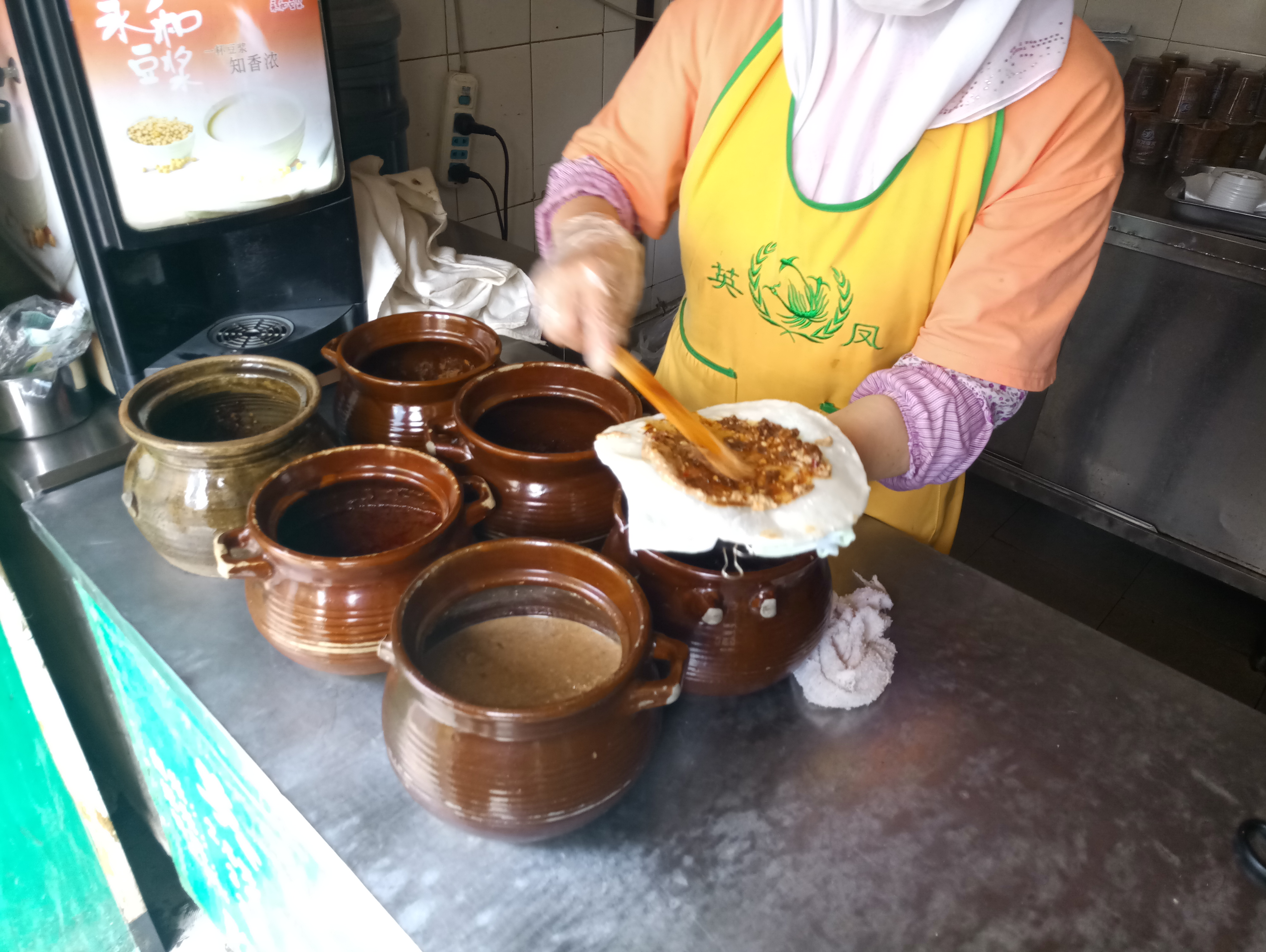
- The seller is smearing sauce after roasting the Erkuai
- Course: Snack
- Place of origin: Yunnan, China
- Region or state: Southwest China
- Main ingredients: rice

Erkuai (Chinese: 饵块; pinyin: ěrkuài) is a type of rice cake particular to the Yunnan Province of southwest China.

It is often served stir-fried with vegetables, and málà (麻辣) sauce, which is a mixture of dried red chilis, Sichuan pepper, and salt.

It is also sold as the popular street food kăo ĕrkuāi (烤饵块) or shāo ěrkuāi grilled and rolled around a yóutiáo (strip of fried dough), with sweet or savory condiments added, making a rolled-up snack resembling a Mexican burrito. The sweet type contains a sweet brown sauce and peanuts, while the savory type is spread with lǔfǔ and bean sprouts, and various other toppings. Kăo ĕrkuāi is particularly popular in the tourist area of Dali.

Its peculiar name has led to it being called one of the Eighteen Oddities in Yunnan.

== See also ==
- Yunnan cuisine
- Tortilla
