= Eighteen Oddities in Yunnan =

Eighteen unique traits of Yunnan province, China

Eighteen Oddities in Yunnan (Chinese: 云南十八怪; pinyin: Yúnnán Shíbā Guài; sometimes called Eighteen Wonders of Yunnan) are eighteen unique traits of the Yunnan province of southwest China. The oddities, which are as follows, are generally presented in the form of a list, which is promulgated in promotional materials advertising the province to foreign and domestic tourists.

1. Eggs are tied up sold in rope-like clusters
2. Bamboo hats are used as wok lids
3. Three mosquitoes make up a dish - mosquitoes are so large that it is said that just three are large enough to make a meal
4. Bamboo is used to make water pipes for smoking
5. Erkuai - a local culinary specialty made of rice, whose name translates literally as "ear piece" (unlike ciba cakes (Chinese: 糍粑; pinyin: cíbā), made from glutinous rice, erkuai is made from regular rice)
6. The same dress is worn for all four seasons - clothing for all four seasons may be seen on a single day in Yunnan, as climatic conditions may vary widely according to altitude and region
7. Young girls are called "Old Lady"
8. Automobiles move faster than trains
9. Toes are exposed all year round
10. Rain here but sunshine there - the weather is often variable between areas just a few kilometers apart
11. Girls wear flowers in all four seasons
12. Girls carry tobacco bags
13. Green vegetables are called "bitter vegetables"
14. Grannies climb mountains faster than monkeys
15. Trains go abroad but not inland
16. Monks can have love affairs
17. Children are raised by men - Yunnan women have a reputation for being hard-working, thus many men stay home to take care of their children
18. Automobiles move in the clouds - many roads are high in the mountains

The items on the list are not fixed, so other versions of the list may include other oddities, including:

1. Stone grows in the clouds - Yunnan's Shilin, or Stone Forest resembles stalagmites growing out of the ground
2. Locusts or grasshoppers are eaten as a delicacy
3. Fresh flowers are served as a vegetable
4. Water and fire are worshipped as gods
5. People sing rather than speak
6. Tea leaves are sold in piles
7. Non-slanting walls are built with cobblestones
8. Keys are hung on waist belts
9. Small, lean horses are hard-working
10. Fresh fruits and vegetables are available in all four seasons
