= Rubing =

Chinese goat cheese

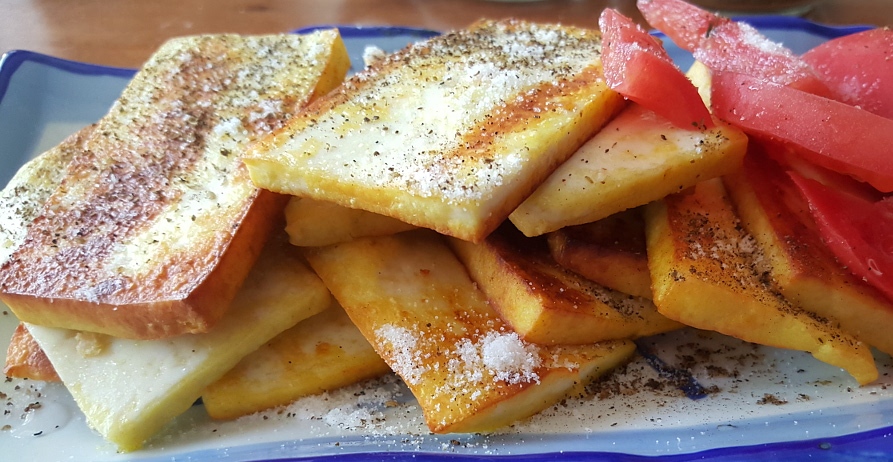
Fried rubing (乳饼) goat's cheese in Kunming (昆明), Yunnan (云南), China

Rubing (simplified Chinese: 乳饼; traditional Chinese: 乳餅; pinyin: rǔbǐng) is a firm, acid-set, non-melting, fresh goat milk farmer cheese made in the Yunnan Province of China by people of the Bai and Sani (recognized as a branch of the Yi in China) minorities. Its Bai name is youdbap, meaning "goat's milk".

== Production ==
Rubing is made by mixing heated goat's milk and a souring agent, traditionally a mixture called nǎiténg (奶藤; lit. 'milk vine') made from a cultivated vine. Rubing is a staple of the Bai and Yi ethnic minorities’ cuisines and is celebrated as one of Yunnan’s most distinctive dairy products.

== Preparation and serving ==
Rubing is most often steamed with local ham or salt beef, or sometimes served pan-fried with salt and chilli. It may also be stir-fried with vegetables (typically a mix of broccoli and carrot), in a similar manner to how other mainland Chinese rural cuisine tends to stir-fry harder forms of tofu. It is also pan-fried and served with alternative flavourings such as dry chilli powder, salt, and Sichuan pepper powder.

== Relationship to other cheeses ==
Rubing is roughly similar to paneer and queso blanco, but with the aroma of fresh goat's milk. Its flavour profile is also comparable to halloumi, sharing a similar flavour characteristic, mild saltiness, slightly tangy notes, and the ability to be grilled without melting.

== See also ==
- Yunnan cuisine
- Rushan (cheese)
- List of goat milk cheeses
