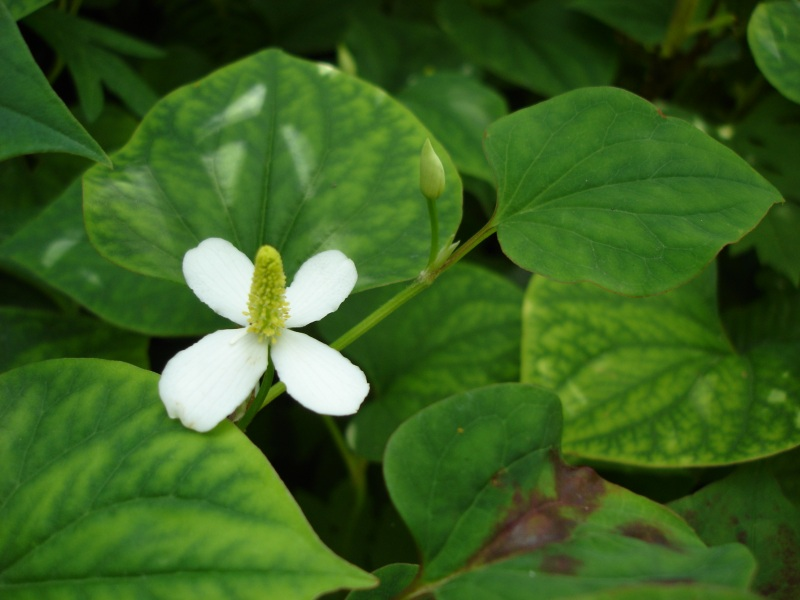

Scientific classification
- Kingdom: Plantae
- Clade: Tracheophytes
- Clade: Angiosperms
- Clade: Magnoliids
- Order: Piperales
- Family: Saururaceae
- Genus: Houttuynia
- Species: H. cordata

Binomial name
- Houttuynia cordata Thunb.

= Houttuynia cordata =

Species of flowering plant

Houttuynia cordata, also known as fish mint, fish leaf, rainbow plant, chameleon plant, heart leaf, fish wort, or Chinese lizard tail, Indian Machhuaji one of two species in the genus Houttuynia (the other being H. emeiensis). It is a flowering plant native to Southeast Asia. It grows in moist, shady locations. It was named after Martinus Houttuyn.

== Growth ==
Houttuynia cordata is a herbaceous perennial plant that can grow to 0.6–1 m (2 ft 0 in – 3 ft 3 in), spreading up to 1 m (3 ft 3 in). The proximal part of the stem is trailing and produces adventitious roots, while the distal part of the stem grows vertically. The leaves are alternate, broadly heart-shaped, 4–9 cm (1 1/2–3 1/2 in) long and 3–8 cm (1–3 in) broad. Its flowers are greenish-yellow and borne on a terminal spike 2–3 cm (3/4–1 1/4 in) long with four to six large white basal bracts. It normally blooms in the summer.

It is considered an invasive plant because of its ability to regrow rhizomes from any segment of its foliage.

== Distribution ==
It is native to Nepal, Taiwan, Myanmar, Bhutan, India, Indonesia, Japan, China, Thailand, Vietnam and Korea. In South Korea, it is found in Gyeongsangbuk-do, Ulleungdo, and the Southern region.

== Cultivation ==
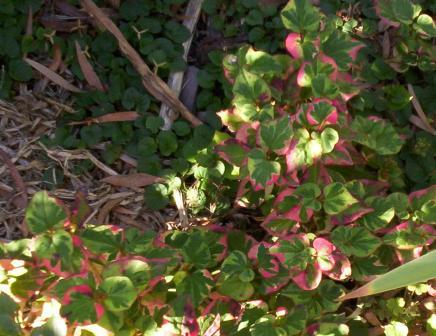
Houttuynia cordata 'Chameleon'

Houttuynia cordata grows in moist to wet soil or slightly submerged in water, as long as it is exposed partially or fully to the sun. It can become invasive in gardens and difficult to eradicate as its roots run deep and actively spread. It can be propagated by division.

It is usually found in one of its cultivated forms in temperate gardens. The 'Chameleon' variety (synonymous with H.cordata 'Court Jester', 'Tricolour', and 'Variegata') is slightly less vigorous than the parent species, with stubbier leaves mottled in both yellow and red. Another common variety, 'Flore Pleno', has masses of white bracts and retains the vigor of the parent species.

Houttuynia cordata has been naturalized in North America.

== Usage ==
=== Culinary use ===
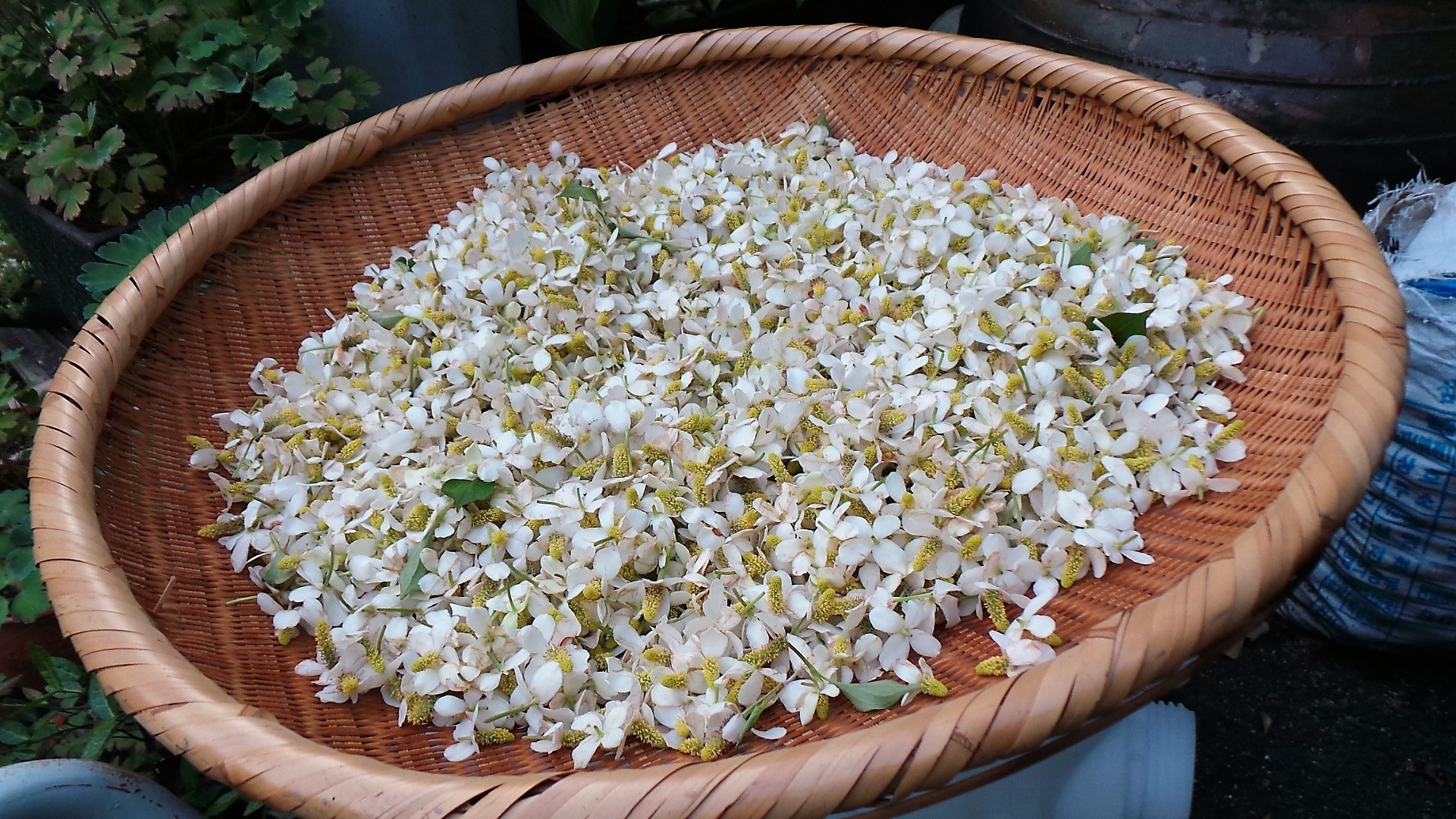
Flowers picked for yakmomil-kkot-cha (flower tea) in sokuri

It is commonly grown as a leaf vegetable, and is used as a fresh herbal garnish. The leaf has an unusual taste from its volatile oil decanoyl acetaldehyde (3-oxododecanal), a taste that is often described as "fishy", earning it the nickname "fish mint".

In northeastern India, the leaves are commonly used in salads, salsas, or cooked with other vegetables, and as a garnish over side dishes. The tender roots can also be ground into chutneys along with dry meat or fish, chilies, and tamarind. It is used raw as a salad and cooked along with fish as fish curry. In Japan and Korea, the dried leaves may be used as an herbal tea. It is called dokudami-cha (どくだみ茶) in Japan and eoseongcho cha (어성초차) in Korea.

In Vietnamese cuisine, the plant is called diếp cá and is used with grilled meat and noodle salad dishes. Fish mint may be used as a garnish with several Vietnamese dishes, such as gỏi cuốn, stir-fried beef with fish mint salad, and bánh xèo.

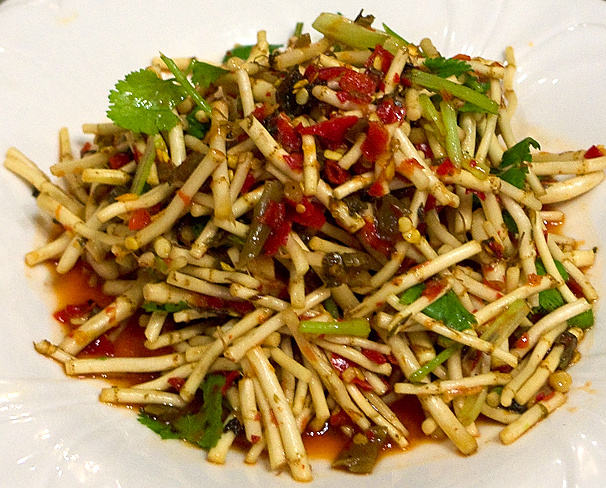
Zhe'ergen is often served as a cold salad after being washed, chopped and tossed with sauces derived from vinegar, chili, coriander and soy sauce.

Zhé'ěrgēn (Chinese: 折耳根, "broken ear-root") is the edible rhizome of Houttuynia cordata (yúxīngcǎo; 魚腥草; "fish-smelling grass") with a fresh, spicy, peppery flavour that is used in southwestern Chinese cuisine, i.e. that of Guizhou, Sichuan, Yunnan and western Guangxi. Typically the leaves are eaten in Sichuan and the root in Guizhou. Zhé'ěrgēn fried with larou (cured pork belly) is one of the staple dishes of Guizhou. uses:

- part of the extensive fried rice cuisine of Guizhou
- a condiment to migan and mixian noodles when served in broth
- as a component of dipping sauces used with the Shiping and Jianshui tradition of barbecued tofu
- raw consumption as part of cold-tossed salads, when it is most frequently combined with coriander, vinegar, fresh chilli, and soy sauce.

=== Traditional medicine ===
Houttuynia cordata was used in traditional Chinese medicine, including by Chinese scientists in an attempt to treat SARS and various other disorders, although there is no high-quality clinical research to confirm such uses are safe or effective, as of 2018. When administered via injection, H. cordata can cause severe allergic reactions.

=== Skincare ===
Extracts of this plant are a major ingredient in Korean skincare products. Many Korean skincare brands market H. cordata under the name heartleaf. H. Cordata has antimicrobrial properties, contains flavonoids and polysaccharides to calm inflammation, and contains antioxidants which have anti-aging effects on the skin.

== Aroma profile ==
Chemical compounds that contribute to the aroma of H. cordata include β-myrcene and 2-undecanone.

== See also ==
- Kampo herb list
- Sichuan cuisine
- Yunnan cuisine
