= Boluo fan =

Rice dish

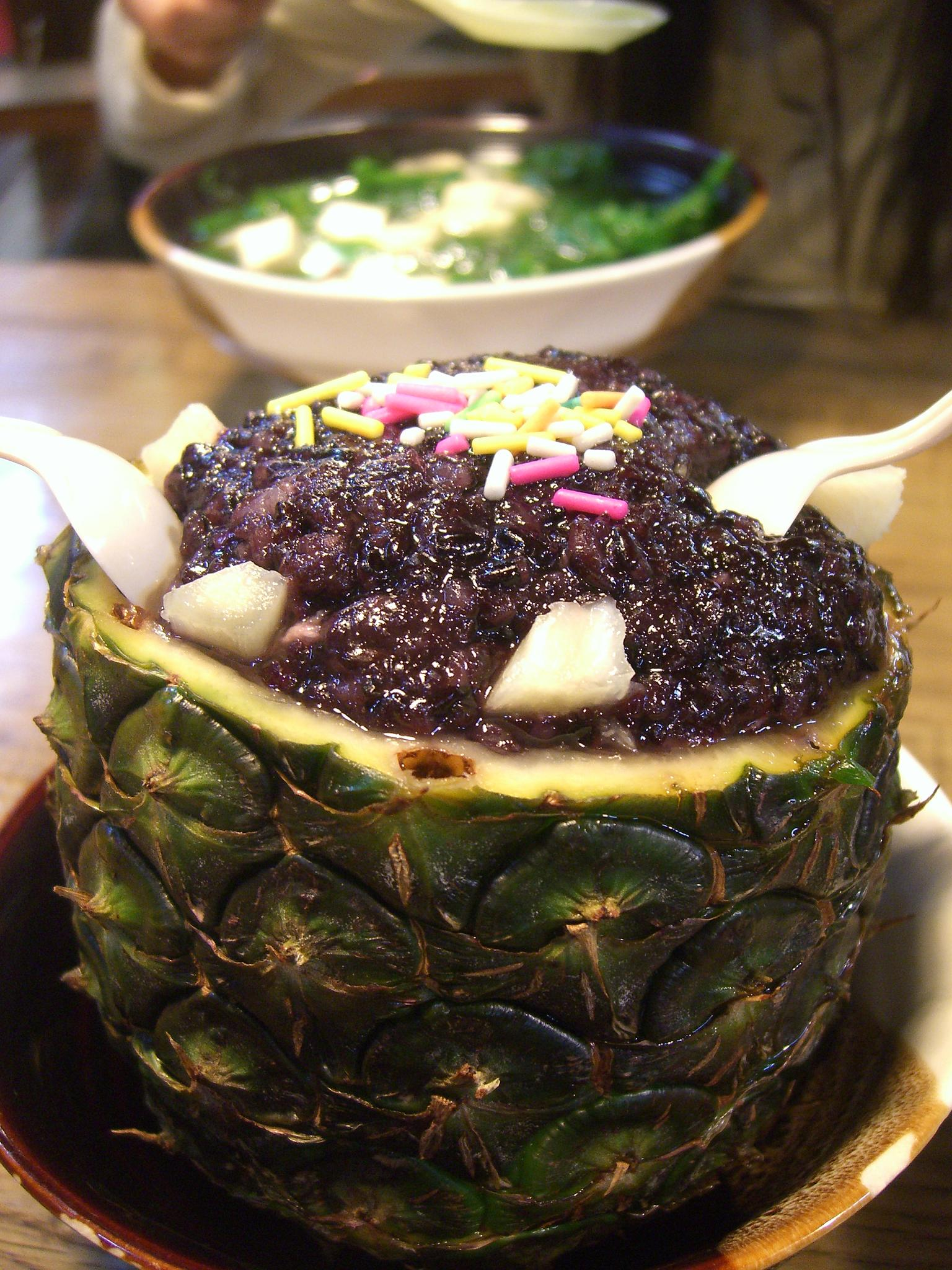
- Alternative names: Pineapple rice
- Type: Rice
- Place of origin: China, Thailand
- Region or state: Yunnan
- Created by: Dai people
- Main ingredients: Glutinous rice (purple and/or white), pineapple, raisins, almonds, coconut milk, rock sugar, salt

Boluo fan (Chinese: 菠萝饭; pinyin: bōluófàn) or pineapple rice is a method of preparing rice for consumption that is used by the Dai people, a Tai cultural group residing in Yunnan province, southwest China.

== Preparation ==
The glutinous rice (usually a mix of purple and white) is soaked overnight, then steamed for around an hour. A ripe pineapple is hollowed out by slicing the top off and removing the flesh or by cutting it lengthwise in two halves, and the flesh is cut into small cubes.

The steamed glutinous rice is then mixed with the removed pineapple flesh, raisins, rock sugar, salt, coconut milk, and sliced almonds. The mixture is placed back in the hollow pineapple and further steamed for another 20 minutes. Boluo fan is a sweet dish. It is used as a side dish for both Yunnan food and Sichuan dishes.

== Geographical extent ==
Similar techniques of preparation exist in other Tai-inhabited areas, i.e. Burma, Laos, Thailand and Vietnam.

== See also ==
- Yunnan cuisine
