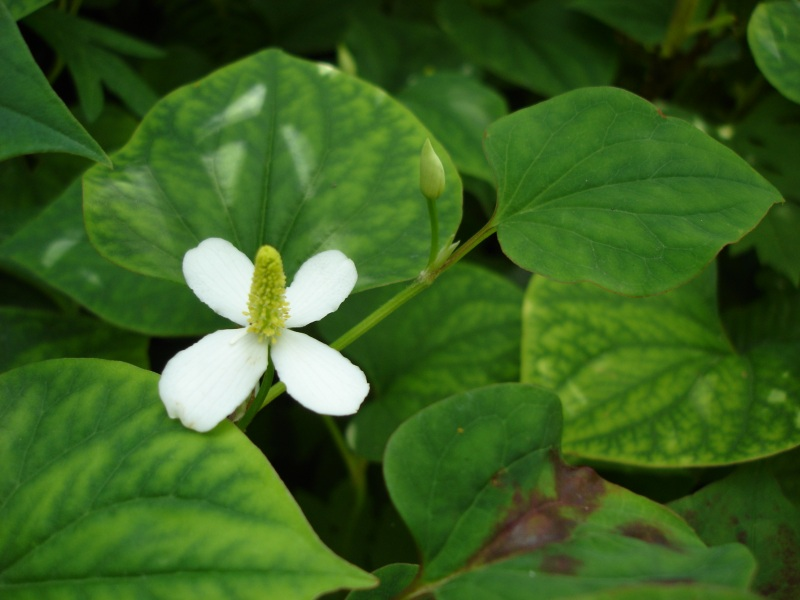
- Houttuynia cordata

Scientific classification
- Kingdom: Plantae
- Clade: Embryophytes
- Clade: Tracheophytes
- Clade: Spermatophytes
- Clade: Angiosperms
- Clade: Magnoliids
- Order: Piperales
- Family: Saururaceae
- Genus: Houttuynia; Thunb.

Species
- Houttuynia cordata; Houttuynia emeiensis

= Houttuynia =

Genus of flowering plants

Houttuynia is a genus of two species native to Southeast Asia in the family Saururaceae. One species, H. cordata, is widely cultivated as a culinary herb. The genus was originally described in 1783 by Carl Peter Thunberg when he formally described H. cordata as the only species. It remained a monotypic genus until 2001 when Zheng Yin Zhu and Shi Liang Zhang discovered and described a second species native to China, H. emeiensis but its validity is still unestablished. The genus was named after Dutch naturalist Martinus Houttuyn.
