= Migan =

Type of rice noodle

- Type: Chinese noodles
- Place of origin: China
- Region or state: Yunnan
- Created by: Dai people
- Main ingredients: Non-glutinous rice
- Other information: Served in broth, or stir fried.

Migan (Chinese: 米干; pinyin: mǐgàn) is a type of rice noodle from the Dai people, a Tai cultural group from Yunnan Province, China. It is made from ordinary non-glutinous rice, and it is only sold fresh.

== Difference from other noodles ==
Unlike the circular mixian, migan is primarily defined by its relatively broad and flat shape. It is somewhat less widely available than mixian, even within Yunnan, though it is still common.

Migan is both rice-flour-based and freshly prepared, which differentiate it from the transparent fensi noodles that are common throughout much of mainland China.

== Serving ==
Migan is typically served either in broth (often a chicken based broth, and particularly commonly consumed in the morning, though still consumed all day) or stir-fried (perhaps more common in the evening).

As with mixian, when migan is served in broth it is common for a range of individual condiments to be presented for customers to add to their bowl themselves. Condiments typically include chilli (diced fresh chilli, plus at least one or two prepared chilli pastes, often mixed with oil), coriander, garlic, pepper (both regular pepper and powdered or whole Sichuan pepper), salt, spring onion, soy sauce, tomato, vinegar and zhe'ergen (a spicy root common to southwestern China). Chefs generally prepare the noodles without breaking them.

== See also ==
- Mixian (noodle)
- Rice, History of domestication and cultivation
- Yunnan cuisine
- Rice noodles
