= Rushan cheese =

Cow's milk cheese of Yunnan, China

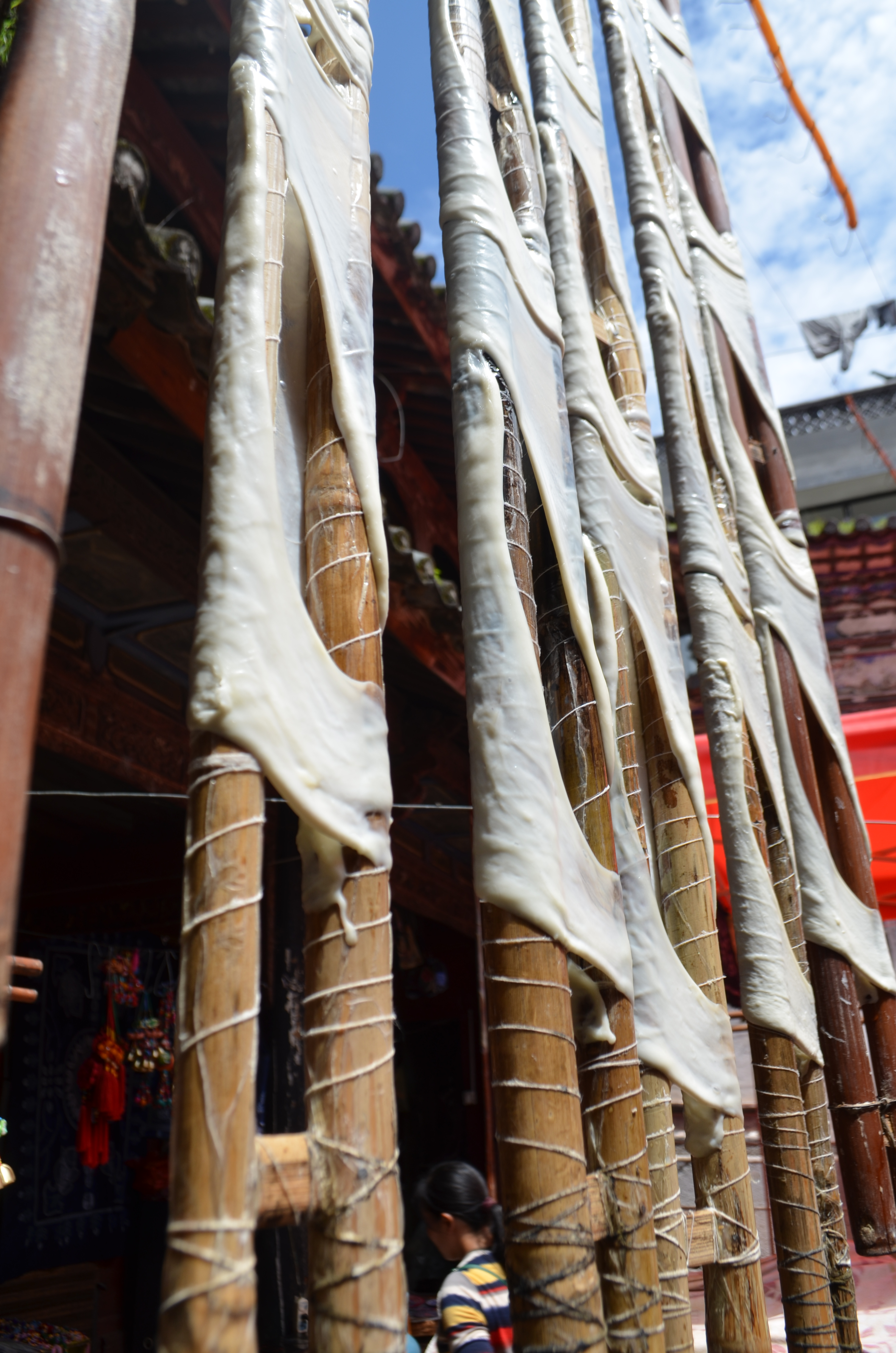
Rushan in drying

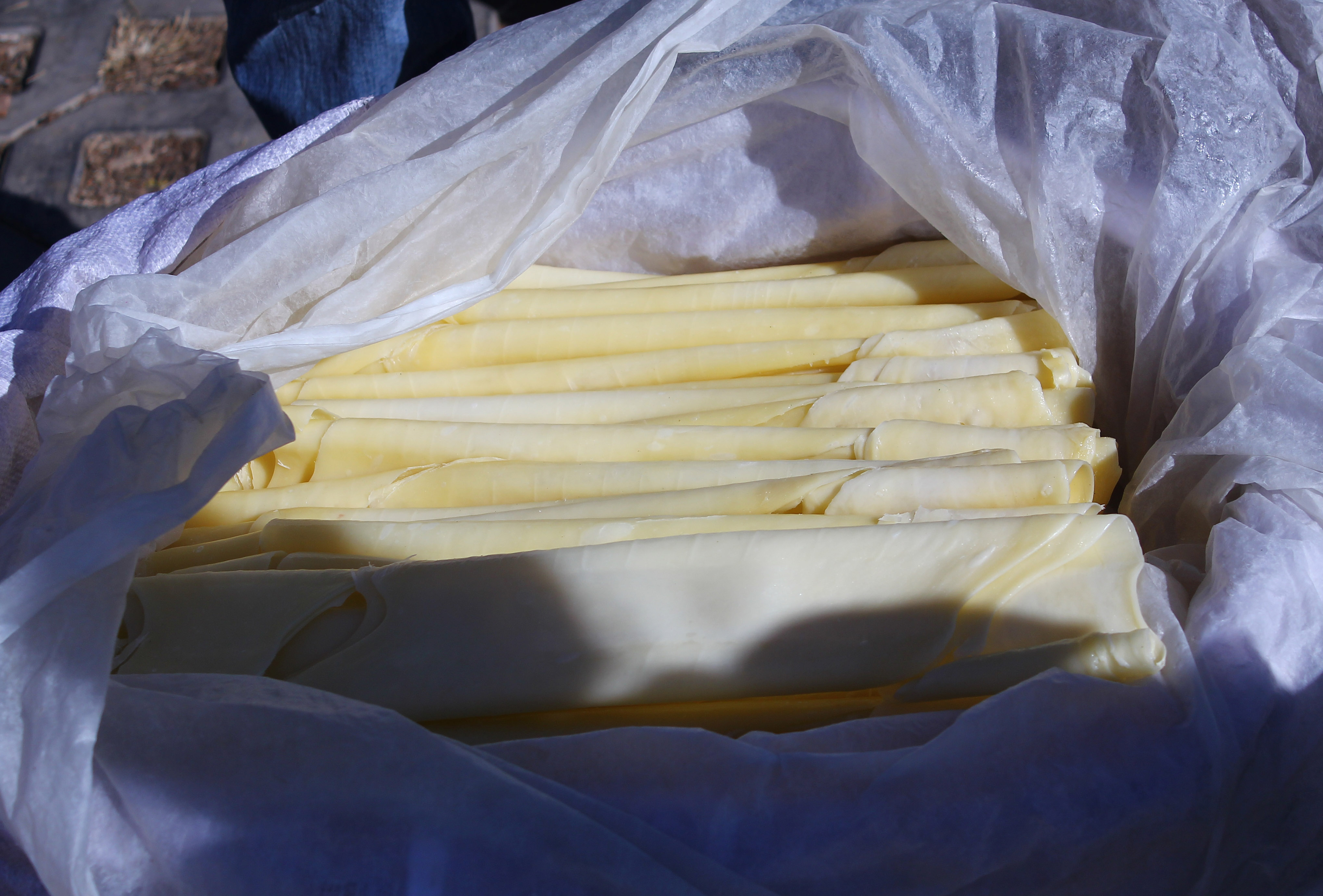
Close up of rushan

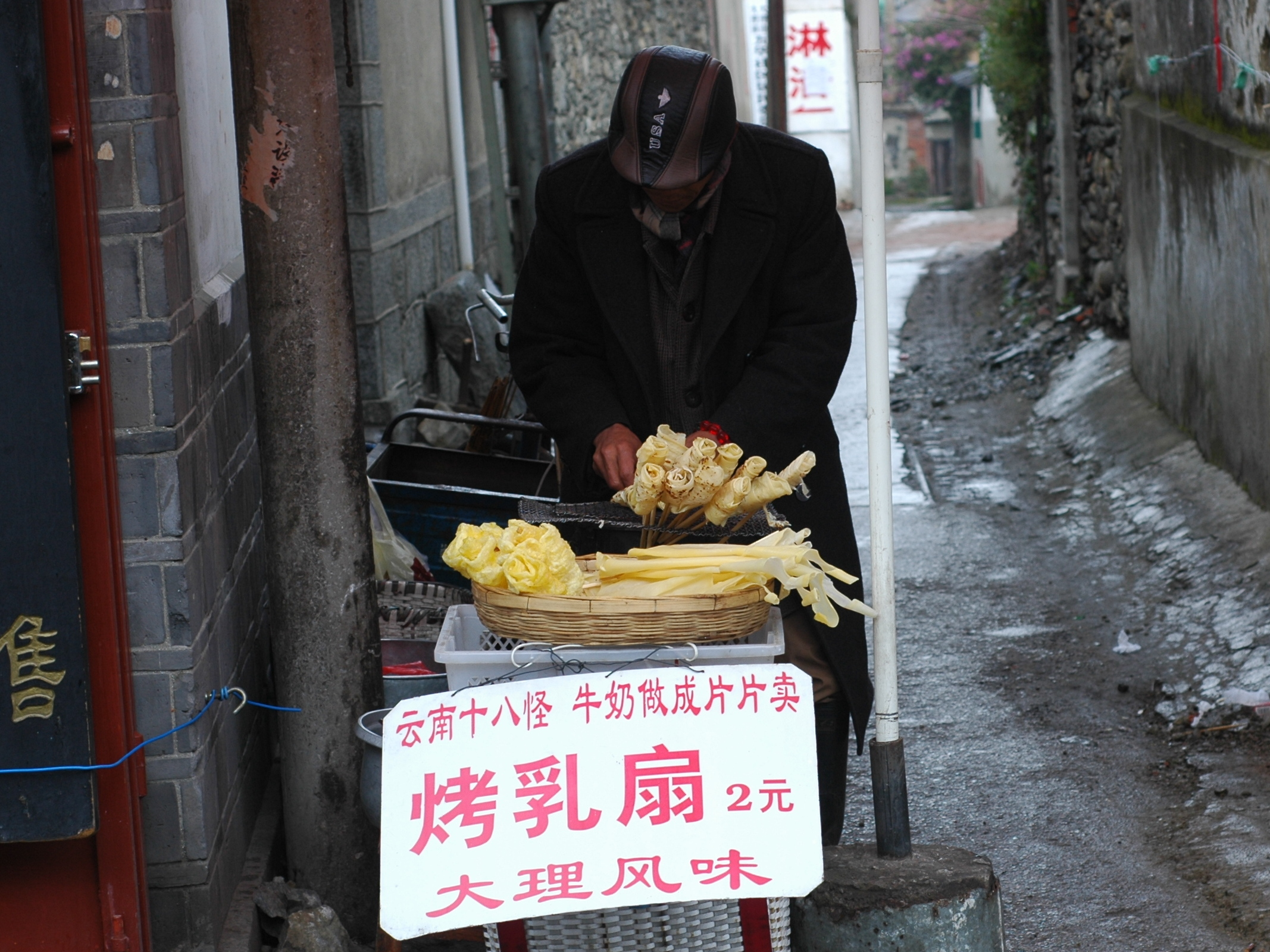
Grilled rushan

Rushan (Chinese: 乳扇; pinyin: rǔshàn; lit. 'milk fan') is a cow's milk cheese of Yunnan, China. It is traditionally made by the Bai people, who call it nvxseiz (or yenx seinp, in another dialect of Bai), the etymology of which is unclear.

Freshly made cows’ milk curds are pulled and stretched into thin sheets, wrapped around long bamboo sticks and hung up until yellow and leather dry.

Rushan are served in a number of ways. One method uses a charcoal grill to warm and soften the milk fan. Traditionally the inside is spread with rose petal jam. Alternatively, the rushan is simply deep fried until golden and crisp.

The Mandarin name means "milk fan" as it is said to resemble a folding fan.

When served grilled (often as a street food), it is usually spread with various sweet condiments and rolled around a stick, resembling an ice pop. Some of the popular toppings include sweetened condensed milk, rose petal infused honey, chocolate syrup, and fruit preserves.

If rushan cheese is served deep fried, the cheese changes its texture and becomes somewhat flaky.

== See also ==
- Rubing
- List of cheeses
