= Lufu (food) =

Type of fermented bean curd

Lufu (Chinese: 卤腐; pinyin: lǔfǔ) is a type of fermented bean curd from Yunnan Province in Southwest China. Colored reddish yellow, it has a soft texture, as well as a savory flavor. It is used as a condiment for kǎo ěrkuài or made into a sauce for Yunnan-style barbecue or stinky tofu.

== See also ==
- Fermented bean curd
- Stinky tofu
