= Mixian (noodle) =

Type of Chinese rice noodle

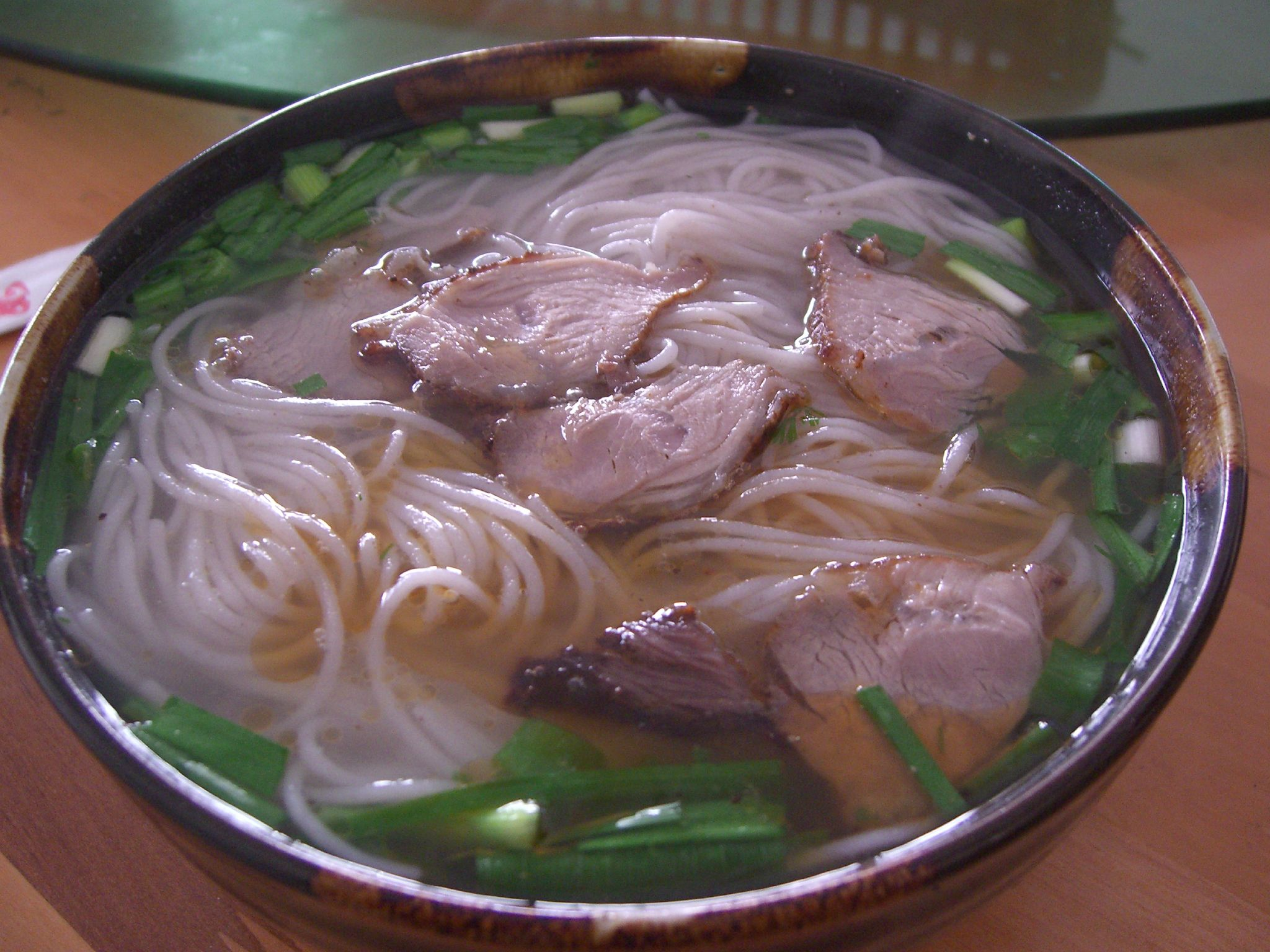
- Mixian noodles served in pork broth with sliced pork, coriander, and chives
- Type: Chinese noodles
- Place of origin: China
- Region or state: Yunnan
- Main ingredients: Non-glutinous rice
- Variations: Ganjiang mixian, suanjiang mixian

Mixian (simplified Chinese: 米线; traditional Chinese: 米線; pinyin: mǐxiàn) is a type of rice noodle from Yunnan Province, China. These noodles are typically distinguished by their round shape, moderate thickness, and smooth, silky texture. They are normally used fresh and are commonly seen in stir-fry recipes, often served with rich broths and sauces.

Similar to glass noodles, rice noodles differ notably in texture. As the Traditional Chinese culinary texts, such as shícì (Chinese: 食次), refer to rice noodles as "càn" (Chinese: 粲). They are commonly called "sour pulp rice noodles" (Chinese: 酸浆米线), "sour noodles" (Chinese: 酸粉), "dry rice noodles" (Chinese: 干米线), and "rice noodles"(Chinese: 米粉). Rich in carbohydrates, vitamins, minerals, and enzymes, rice noodles cook quickly and evenly, and maintain their firmness when boiled, making them suitable for hot-pot and casual dining.

== Historical development ==
The term "粲" in shícì, an ancient Chinese culinary book, is thought to originate from the term "精米" (jīngmǐ, or refined rice), representing finely crafted dishes. <齐民要术> (QímínYàoshù), a classical Chinese agricultural text, describes the preparation of “粲”: glutinous rice is ground into a fine powder, mixed with honey and water, and extruded through a perforated bamboo utensil, forming fine strands which are then boiled in oil. This meticulous process, which produced delicate rice noodles, contributed to the honorific term "粲."

In the Song Dynasty, rice noodles, also known as "米缆" (rice cords), were crafted into dry, silken strands suitable for gifting. The poet Chen Zao described these noodles as "one hundred feet long, thin as silk," indicating the artisanal finesse achieved during this period. By the Ming and Qing dynasties, the dish was called "米糷" (mǐlàn), with varied recipes documented, including one with finely milled glutinous rice and another with rice flour paste, seasoned with pepper, soy sauce, and green onions.

== Folklore of Mixian ==
Crossing the Bridge Rice Noodles' is believed to have originated over a century ago in Mengzi County, southern Yunnan, China. According to local legend, the dish was created by the wife of a scholar named Yang, who would study at a pavilion on South Lake in Mengzi. Focused on his studies, Yang often neglected his meals, causing the food to go cold, which affected his health.

To keep his meals warm, Yang’s wife used a clay pot to prepare chicken soup, which retained heat effectively. She discovered that a layer of chicken fat on the soup’s surface helped insulate the broth, keeping it warm. She then added rice noodles, vegetables, and thin slices of meat to the hot broth, allowing them to cook quickly and remain hot for her husband’s meal.

This method of preparation became known as 'Crossing the Bridge Rice Noodles,' named after the small bridge that Yang’s wife crossed to bring the meal. Over time, the dish gained popularity as chefs in Yunnan further refined and adapted it, and it eventually became a renowned specialty in southern Yunnan, recognized both within China and internationally.

== Modern rice noodle production ==
Modern rice noodle production, particularly in Yunnan, utilizes two main methods. The traditional “sour pulp rice noodles” are made from fermented rice, yielding noodles that are resilient, smooth, and slightly sweet, with a unique rice aroma. The second, faster method uses rice flour extruded through a machine to create "dry rice noodles," which are easy to store and transport. Once dehydrated, dry rice noodles are ideal for quick meals and retain a firmer, chewable texture compared to their sour pulp counterparts.

Mechanization has differentiated rice noodles from similar products, particularly "Mifen" (Chinese: 米粉; rice vermicelli), commonly produced in southern China with additional ingredients like sweet potato or potato starch, giving them a softer texture and distinct storage properties. The texture of rice noodles, especially sour pulp noodles, is resilient and chewy, while "Mifen" is smoother and more tender.

In contemporary Chinese cuisine, “dry rice noodles” resemble Mifen in preservation techniques, facilitating long-term storage without spoilage. However, dry rice noodles are uniquely made from pure rice, unlike Mifen, which is more flexible in its composition. In regions like Yunnan, rice noodles maintain a distinct identity, whereas rice vermicelli found elsewhere evolved from rice noodles, showcasing both preservation of tradition and regional culinary innovation.

== Nutritional value ==
High-quality mixian provide essential nutrients such as minerals, carbohydrates, vitamins, and enzymes. They are easy to cook, evenly textured, and resistant to overcooking. The combination with spicy broth enriches their flavor while remaining easy to digest, making them appropriate for quick meals or fast food consumption.

Rice noodles provide essential energy from starch, which helps with brain function, and their dietary fiber encourages healthy digestion. They also help to conserve body protein and have a warming effect on the stomach, which is beneficial for easing stomach cold symptoms. They are also helpful for spleen and stomach, helping with illnesses like indigestion. Although rice noodles lose some nutrients when soaked, mixing them with a variety of seasonings helps to preserve their nutritional value and flavor.

== Serving ==
Mixian is served in various ways, either in broth or stir-fried.

=== Stir-fried ===
Stir-fried preparation is rapid, most common in the evening, and is popular at roadside barbecue-type stands throughout Yunnan. Egg, tomato, meat, spring onion and chilli are frequently utilized.

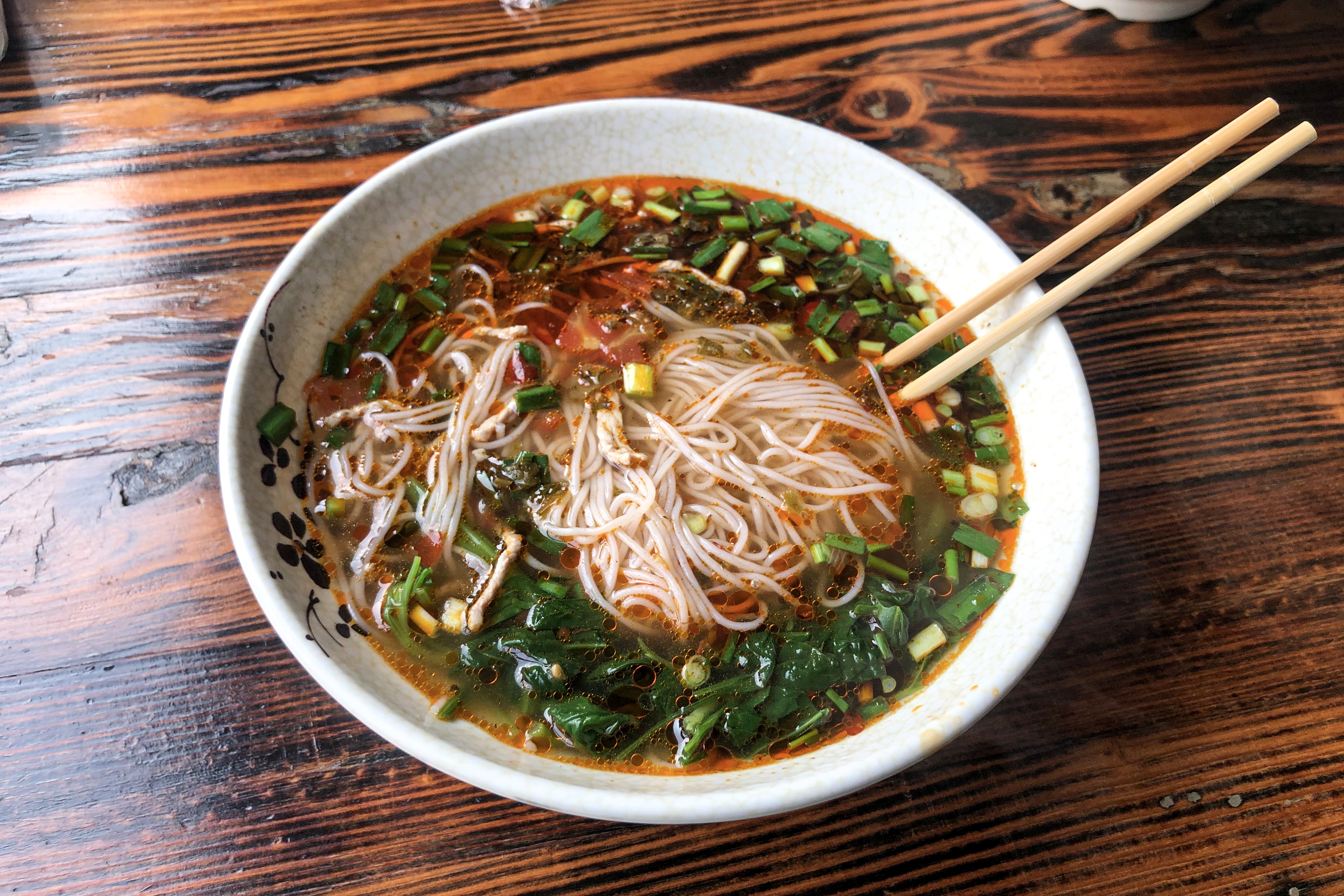
Spicy Mixian (rice noodle)

=== Broth ===
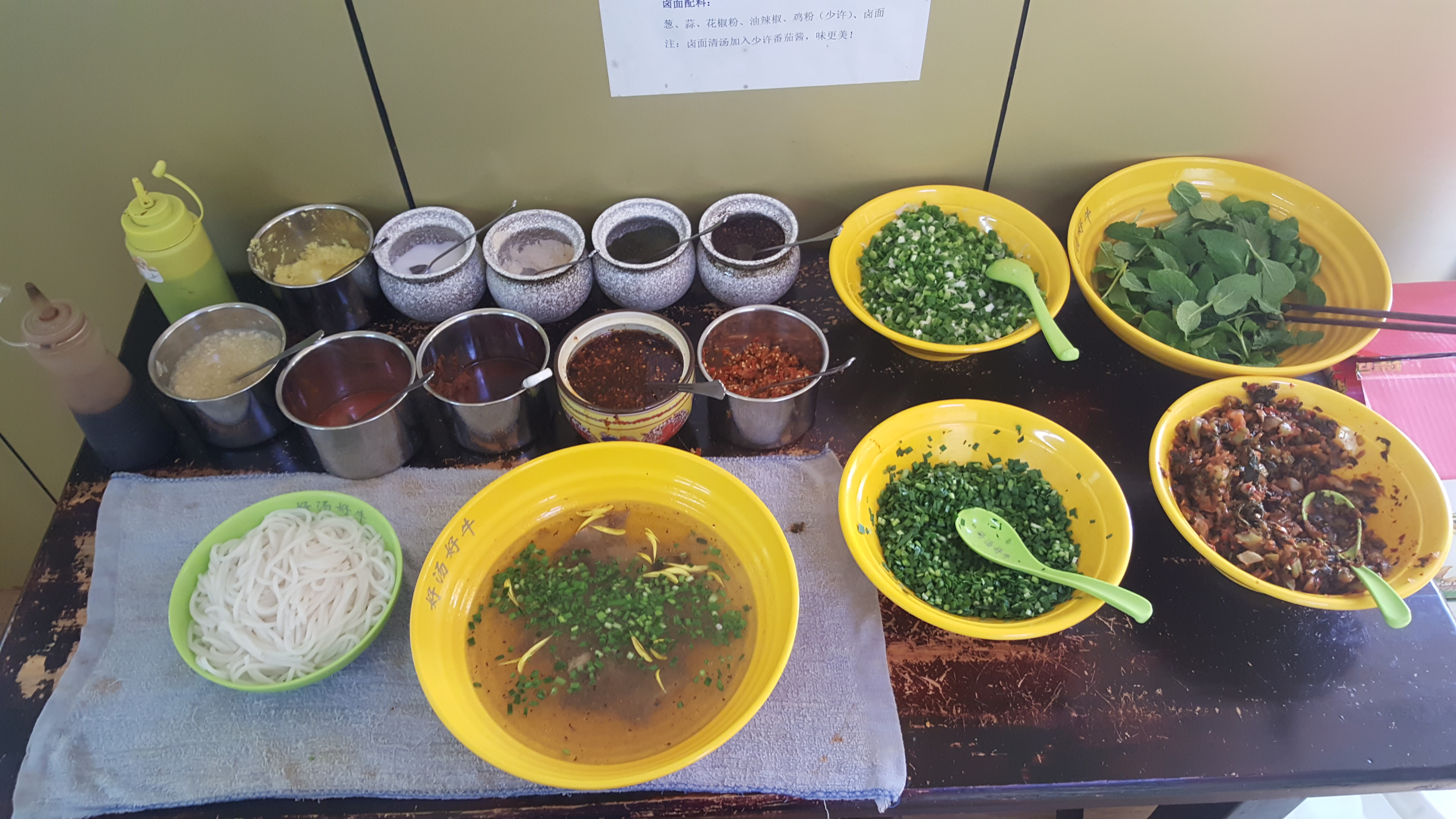
Beef mixian and condiments in a restaurant in China. The broth includes chrysanthemum flowers

Condiments vary significantly but may typically include some subset of the following:

- chicken powder or essence
- chili pepper (diced fresh chili, plus at least one or two prepared chilli pastes, often mixed with oil)
- chrysanthemum flowers
- coriander
- mint
- garlic (often finely diced, in liquid suspension, or in thin sectioned slices)
- ginger (as above, but less commonly in slices)
- pepper (both regular pepper and powdered or whole Sichuan pepper)
- salt
- sesame oil
- Sichuan pepper oil
- soy sauce
- spring onion
- suan cai (pickled or preserved vegetable)
- tomato
- vinegar
- wood ear mushroom
- zhe'ergen (a spicy root common to southwestern China).

== Varieties of rice noodle dishes ==
Mixian comes in a variety of forms depending on method and ingredient. Typically there are 4 general methods to prepare fresh mixian: 1. boil 煮 2. blanch 烫 3. stir-fried 炒 4. cold mix 凉拌. Most common method being blanching, b/c mixian is typ. purchased freshly made from the market, thus still soft and only requires reheating. Common to most form/method of mixian is the hat(帽子）and ingredient bar. In both family and commercial settings, a hat is a topping, typically made of meat flavored with heavy sauces, such as fermented bean sauce or soy sauce. Popular hats include smothered pork 焖肉, spicy chicken 辣鸡, braised beef 红烧牛肉, and some specialty ones like eel 鳝鱼. A ingredient bar is an assortment of herbs, pickles, sauces, and other ready-to-eat items that are laid out for one to customize the dish to their liking.

=== Small Pot rice noodle 小锅米线 ===
This dish gets its name from the single-serve pot it is cooked in, typ. clay or copper. First, the broth is made from water, soy sauce, minced meat, garlic chives and various other ingredients, then fresh noodle is added to be boiled. Boiling time is short to prevent noodle from breaking up into smaller pieces. It can be served with or without a hat.

=== Big Pot rice noodle 大锅米线 ===
Akin to small pot, this dish is made from similar ingredients but in a large communal pot, where noodle is boiled with minced meat and minced vegetables. This dish is rarely seen outside of a family gathering. Specific method and ingredients will depend on individual family traditions.

=== Clear soup rice noodle 清汤米线 ===
As the name suggests, the noodle is served in a clear meat broth, without adding any color altering/heavy sauces such as soy or bean sauce. In a bowl, herbs are first placed at the bottom, then blanched fresh noodles, soup and meat is added in that order. If beef broth, mint is added. If pork broth, typ. ribs, mint is never used.

=== Crossing-the-bridge rice noodle 过桥米线 ===
Crossing-the-bridge rice noodles is a Mengzi specialty in Yunnan, China. It is a "self-assembled" soup noodle dish, where each ingredient is served separately and the patron must put everything together. The patron will be served with a piping hot broth made from chicken, various meats and most importantly, Xianwei ham. Ingredients are added to the hot broth in the following order: raw meat/eggs, raw vegetables, cooked meats and vegetables. This sequence ensures raw ingredients are cooked before the broth cools. Lastly blanched fresh rice noodle is added before eating.

=== Cattail shoot rice noodle 草芽米线 ===
A dish from Jianshui, Yunnan, which uses a local cattail shoot to make the broth, along with variety of meats. Broth is similar to crossing-the-bridge noodle in flavor, served in similar over-sized bowls, but not "self-assembled" as in the case of the former.

=== Pea soup rice noodle 稀豆粉米线 ===
A specialty of Dali, Yunnan. Blanched noodles are served in a thick soup made from reconstituted pea powder. It is flavored with black cardamom, Sichuan peppercorn, chilli oil, scallions, etc.

=== Lo-rice noodle 卤米线 ===
A ubiquitous soup-less noodle dish. First, fresh noodle is blanched, then a hat is added, typ. minced meat sauce 杂酱面, and then finished with various ingredients including but not limited to the following: garlic chive, cilantro, scallion, pickled mustard green, sesame, peanut crumbles, deep-fried peas, etc. It is mixed while warm, and best left to rest for noodle to absorb the flavors before serving. A clear broth is may be served as a side.

=== Fermented(Stinky) Tofu rice noodle 臭豆腐米线 ===
This dish is similar to that titled "Dry mixed rice noodle." Starting out with blanched fresh noodles in a large bowl, the sauce of this dish is made from fermented tofu mixed with various other ingredients, copious amount of chill oil and sauces to give it a pungent and strong flavor. Sauce can include soy sauce, minced meat sauce, vinegar, etc. 豆花米线 (Douhua mixian) is a milder-smelling version as it uses silken tofu instead of the stinkier variant of tofu used in this dish.

=== Cold rice noodle 凉拌米线 ===
A ubiquitous soup-less noodle dish made from cold sauces and cold ingredients. Flavor profile of this dish is generally salt, sour, and spicy. Typical main ingredients consist of soy sauce, vinegar, grounded fresh garlic and ginger, lots of chilly oil, scallion cilantro, and crushed peanuts and pork crackling for texture. Ingredients will vary depending on region. Noodle is blanched and it is always mixed right before eating.

=== Sour soup noodle 酸汤米线 ===
A popular dish from various places, but notably from Wenshan, Yunnan. Sourness of this dish comes from fermented ingredients used in making the broth, typically fermented tomatoes and fermented flowering-quince fruit, rarely fermented blueberries can also be used. Method is akin to Xiaoguo where the noodle is lightly boiled in the broth, in order to absorb the flavor. Can be served with or without a hat.

=== Tomato Soup noodle 蕃茄湯米綫 ===
A popular newly made noodle dish. it is notably famous in Hong Kong, China. It is noodles in a sweet and sour tomato soup that normally comes with fat beef as the topping. It is very popular among lots of people in Hong Kong.

== See also ==
- Migan (noodle)
- Rice, History of domestication and cultivation
- Yunnan cuisine
- Khanom chin, a Thai fermented-rice noodle
