= Chinese cuisine =

Culinary traditions of China

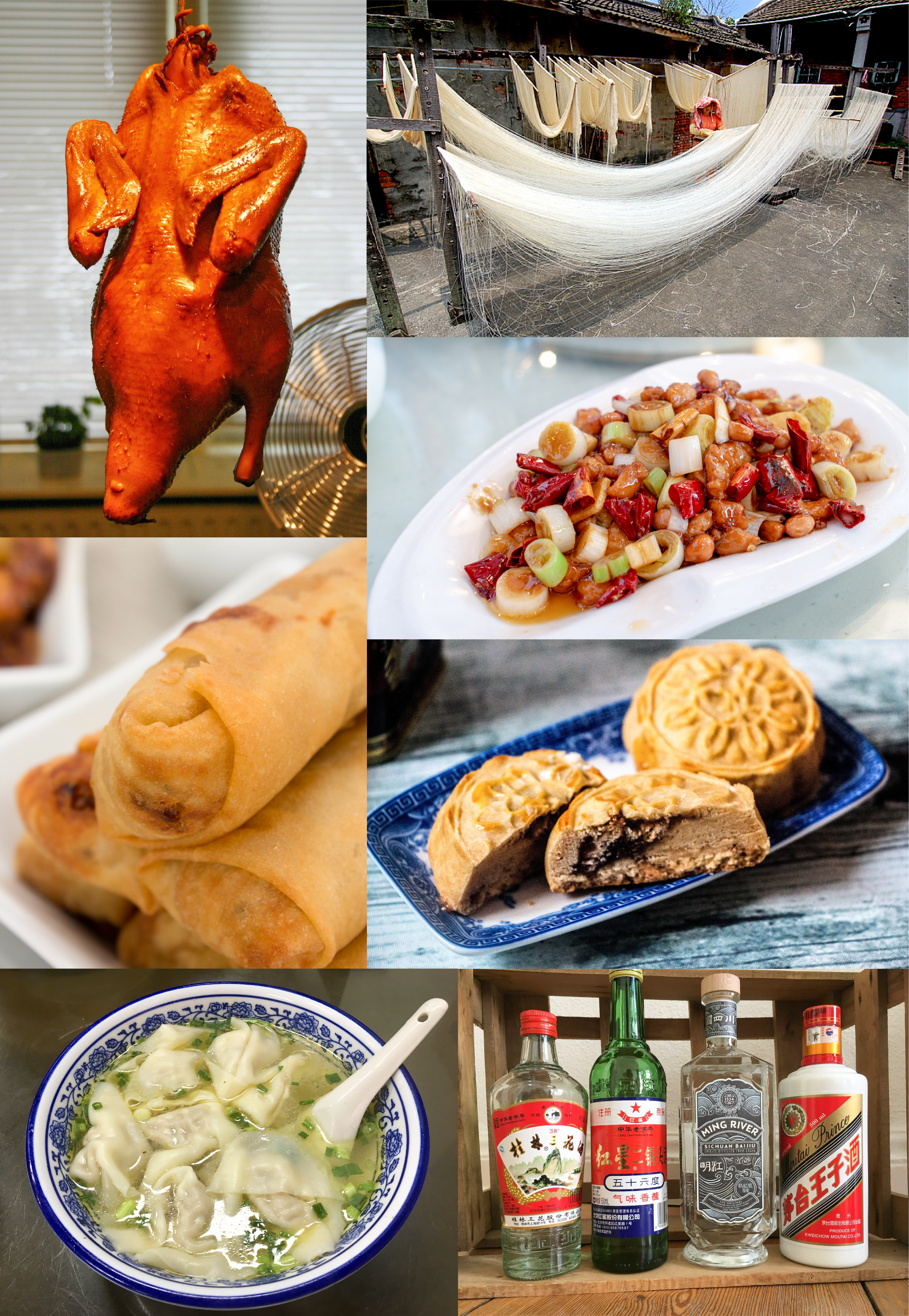
An assortment of Chinese food. Clockwise from top left: Peking duck, misua, Kung Pao chicken, mooncakes, baijiu, wonton soup, spring rolls

Chinese cuisine comprises cuisines originating from China, that varies with the country's large population and geographic diversity, as well as from Chinese people from other parts of the world. Due to the Chinese diaspora and the historical power of the country, Chinese cuisine has profoundly influenced other cuisines in Asia and beyond, with modifications made to cater to local palates. Chinese food staples like rice, soy sauce, noodles, tea, chili oil, and tofu, and utensils such as chopsticks and the wok, can now be found worldwide.

The world's earliest eating establishments recognizable as restaurants in the modern sense first emerged in the Song dynasty China during the 11th and 12th centuries. Street food became an integral aspect of Chinese food culture in the 7th century during the Tang dynasty, and the street food culture of much of Southeast Asia was established by workers imported from China during the late 19th century.

The preferences for seasoning and cooking techniques in Chinese provinces depend on differences in social class, religion, historical background, and ethnic groups. Geographic features including mountains, rivers, forests, and deserts also have a strong effect on the locally available ingredients, considering that the climate of China varies from tropical in the south to subarctic in the northeast. Imperial royal and noble preferences also play a role in the change of Chinese cuisine. Because of imperial expansion, immigration, and trading, ingredients and cooking techniques from other cultures have been integrated into Chinese cuisines over time and Chinese culinary influences have spread worldwide.

There are numerous regional, religious, and ethnic styles of Chinese cuisine found within China and abroad. Chinese cuisine is highly diverse and most frequently categorised into provincial divisions, although these province-level classifications consist of many more styles within themselves. During the Qing dynasty, the most praised Four Great Traditions in Chinese cuisine were Chuan, Lu, Yue, and Huaiyang, representing cuisines of West, North, South, and East China, respectively.

For example, in Northern China, the dry, temperate climate makes it suitable for the cultivation of wheat, millet and other grains. As such, noodles, porridge and bread are dietary staples.

In 1980, a modern grouping from Chinese journalist Wang Shaoquan's article published in the People's Daily newspaper identified the Eight Cuisines of China as Anhui (徽菜; Huīcài), Guangdong (粵菜; Yuècài), Fujian (閩菜; Mǐncài), Hunan (湘菜; Xiāngcài), Jiangsu (蘇菜; Sūcài), Shandong (魯菜; Lǔcài), Sichuan (川菜; Chuāncài), and Zhejiang (浙菜; Zhècài).

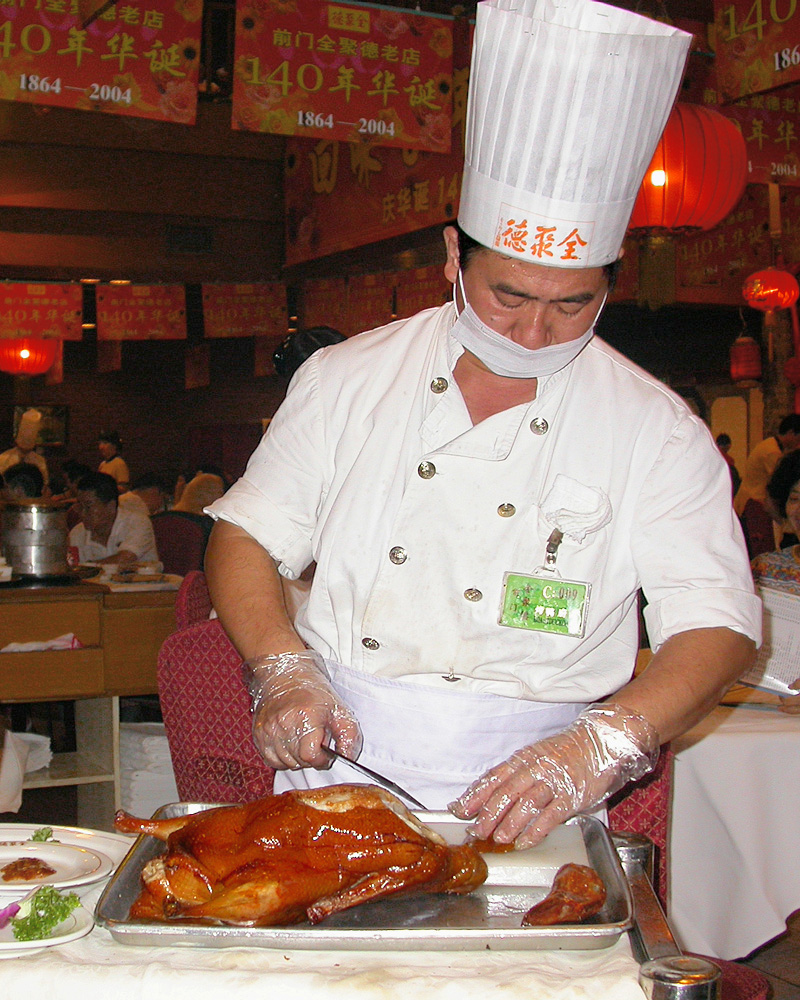
A Quanjude cook is slicing Peking roast duck. Peking duck is eaten by rolling pieces of duck with scallion, cucumber and sweet bean sauce using steamed pancakes.

Chinese cuisine is deeply intertwined with traditional Chinese medicine, such as in the practise of Chinese food therapy. Color, scent and taste are the three traditional aspects used to describe Chinese food, as well as the meaning, appearance, and nutrition of the food. Cooking should be appraised with respect to the ingredients used, knife work, cooking time, and seasoning.

== History ==
=== Pre-Tang dynasty ===
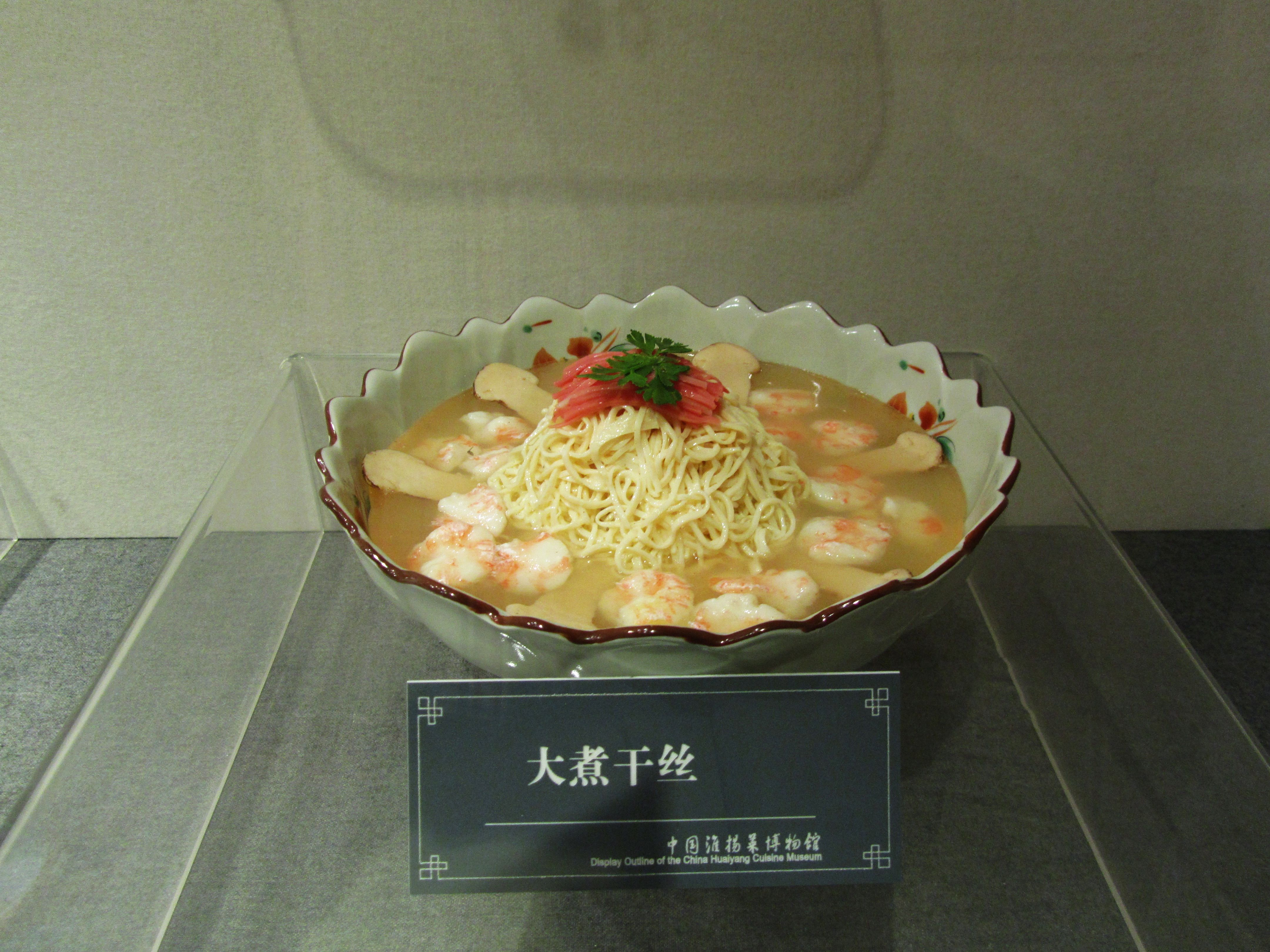
Dàzhǔ gānsī is a typical soup dish of Huaiyang cuisine. It is made of finely sliced dried tofu, chicken, ham and bamboo shoot, and the ingredients need to be braised with shrimp in chicken soup. It was highly praised by the Qianlong emperor.

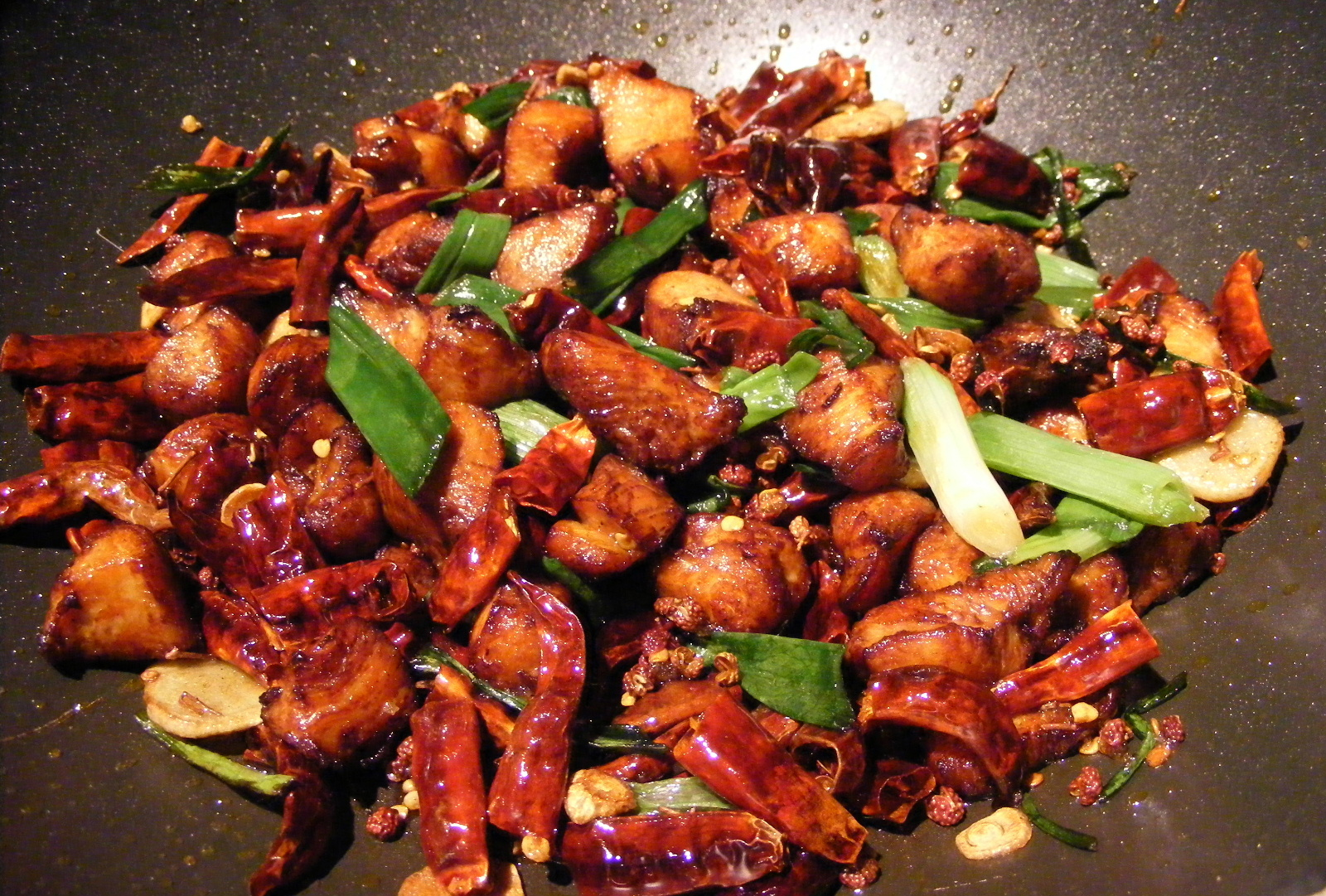
Làzǐ Jī, stir-fried chicken with chili and Sichuan pepper in Sichuan style

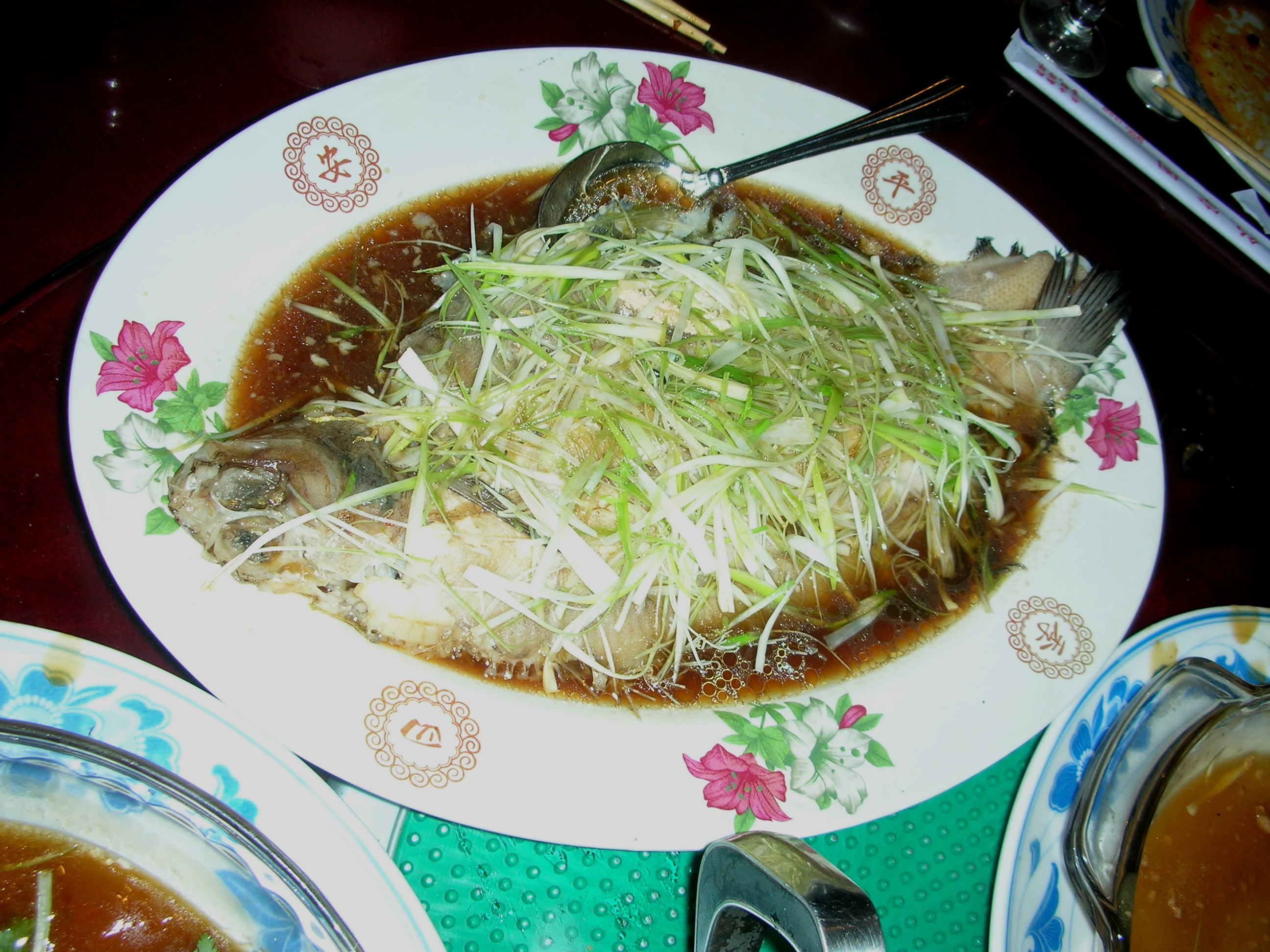
Steamed whole perch with roe inside. Sliced ginger and spring onion is usually spread on top.

Chinese society greatly valued gastronomy, and developed an extensive study of the subject based on its traditional medical beliefs. Chinese culture initially centered around the North China Plain. The first domesticated crops seem to have been the foxtail and broomcorn varieties of millet, while rice was cultivated in the south. By 2000 BC, wheat had arrived from western Asia. These grains were typically served as warm noodle soups instead of baked into bread as in Europe. Nobles hunted various wild game and consumed mutton, pork and dog as these animals were domesticated. Grain was stored against famine and flood and meat was preserved with salt, vinegar, curing, and fermenting. The flavor of the meat was enhanced by cooking it in animal fats though this practice was mostly restricted to the wealthy.

By the time of Confucius in the late Zhou, gastronomy had become a high art. Confucius discussed the principles of dining:

The rice would never be too white, the meat would never be too finely cut... When it was not cooked right, man would not eat. When it was cooked bad, man would not eat. When the meat was not cut properly, man would not eat. When the food was not prepared with the right sauce, man would not eat. Although there are plenty of meats, they should not be cooked more than staple food. There is no limit for alcohol, before a man gets drunk.

The Lüshi chunqiu notes: "Only if one is chosen as the Son of Heaven will the tastiest delicacies be prepared [for him]."

The Zhaohun (4–3rd c. BC) gives some examples: turtle ragout, honey cakes and beer (chilled with ice).

During Shi Huangdi's Qin dynasty, the empire expanded into the south. By the time of the Han dynasty, the different regions and cuisines of China's people were linked by major canals and leading to greater complexity in the different regional cuisines. Not only is food seen as giving "qi", energy, but the food is also about maintaining yin and yang. The philosophy behind it was rooted in the I Ching and Chinese traditional medicine: food was judged for color, aroma, taste, and texture and a good meal was expected to balance the Four Natures ('hot', warm, cool, and 'cold') and the Five Tastes (pungent, sweet, sour, bitter, and salty). Salt was used as a preservative from early times, but in cooking was added in the form of soy sauce, and not at the table.

By the Later Han period (2nd century), writers frequently complained of lazy aristocrats who did nothing but sit around all day eating smoked meats and roasts.

During the Han dynasty, the Chinese developed methods of food preservation for military rations during campaigns such as drying meat into jerky and cooking, roasting, and drying grain. Chinese legends claim that the roasted, flat bread shaobing was brought back from the Xiyu (the Western Regions, a name for Central Asia) by the Han dynasty General Ban Chao, and that it was originally known as hubing (胡餅, lit. "barbarian bread"). The shaobing is believed to be descended from the hubing. Shaobing is believed to be related to the Persian nan and Central Asian nan, as well as the Middle Eastern pita. Foreign westerners made and sold sesame cakes in China during the Tang dynasty.

During the Southern and Northern dynasties non-Han people like the Xianbei of Northern Wei introduced their cuisine to northern China, and these influences continued up to the Tang dynasty, popularizing meat like mutton and dairy products like goat milk, yogurts, and Kumis among even Han people. It was during the Song dynasty that Han Chinese developed an aversion to dairy products and abandoned the dairy foods introduced earlier.

The Han Chinese rebel Wang Su who received asylum in the Xianbei Northern Wei after fleeing from Southern Qi, at first could not stand eating dairy products like goat's milk and meat like mutton and had to consume tea and fish instead, but after a few years he was able to eat yogurt and lamb, and the Xianbei Emperor asked him which of the foods of China (Zhongguo) he preferred, fish vs mutton and tea vs yogurt.

=== Post-Tang dynasty ===
The great migration of Chinese people south during the invasions preceding and during the Song dynasty increased the relative importance of southern Chinese staples such as rice and congee. Su Dongpo has improved the red braised pork as Dongpo pork. The dietary and culinary habits also changed greatly during this period, with many ingredients such as soy sauce and Central Asian influenced foods becoming widespread and the creation of important cookbooks such as the Shanjia Qinggong (Chinese: 山家清供; pinyin: Shānjiā qīnggòng) and the Wushi Zhongkuilu (Chinese: 吳氏中饋錄; pinyin: Wúshì zhōngkuìlù) showing the respective esoteric foods and common household cuisine of the time.

The Yuan and Qing dynasties introduced Mongolian and Manchu cuisine, warm northern dishes that popularized hot pot cooking. During the Yuan dynasty many Muslim communities emerged in China, who practiced a porkless cuisine now preserved by Hui restaurants throughout the country. Yunnan cuisine is unique in China for its cheeses like Rubing and Rushan cheese made by the Bai people, and its yogurt, the yogurt may have been due to a combination of Mongolian influence during the Yuan dynasty, the Central Asian settlement in Yunnan, and the proximity and influence of India and Tibet on Yunnan.

As part of the last leg of the Columbian Exchange, Spanish and Portuguese traders began introducing foods from the New World to China through the port cities of Canton and Macau. Mexican chili peppers became essential ingredients in Sichuan cuisine and calorically dense potatoes and corn became staple foods across the northern plains.

During the Qing dynasty, Chinese gastronomes such as Yuan Mei focused upon the primary goal of extracting the maximum flavour of each ingredient. As noted in his culinary work the Suiyuan shidan, however, the fashions of cuisine at the time were quite varied and in some cases were flamboyantly ostentatious, especially when the display served also a formal ceremonial purpose, as in the case of the Manchu Han Imperial Feast.

As the pace of life increases in modern China, fast food like fried noodles, fried rice and gaifan (dish over rice) become more and more popular.

== Regional cuisines ==
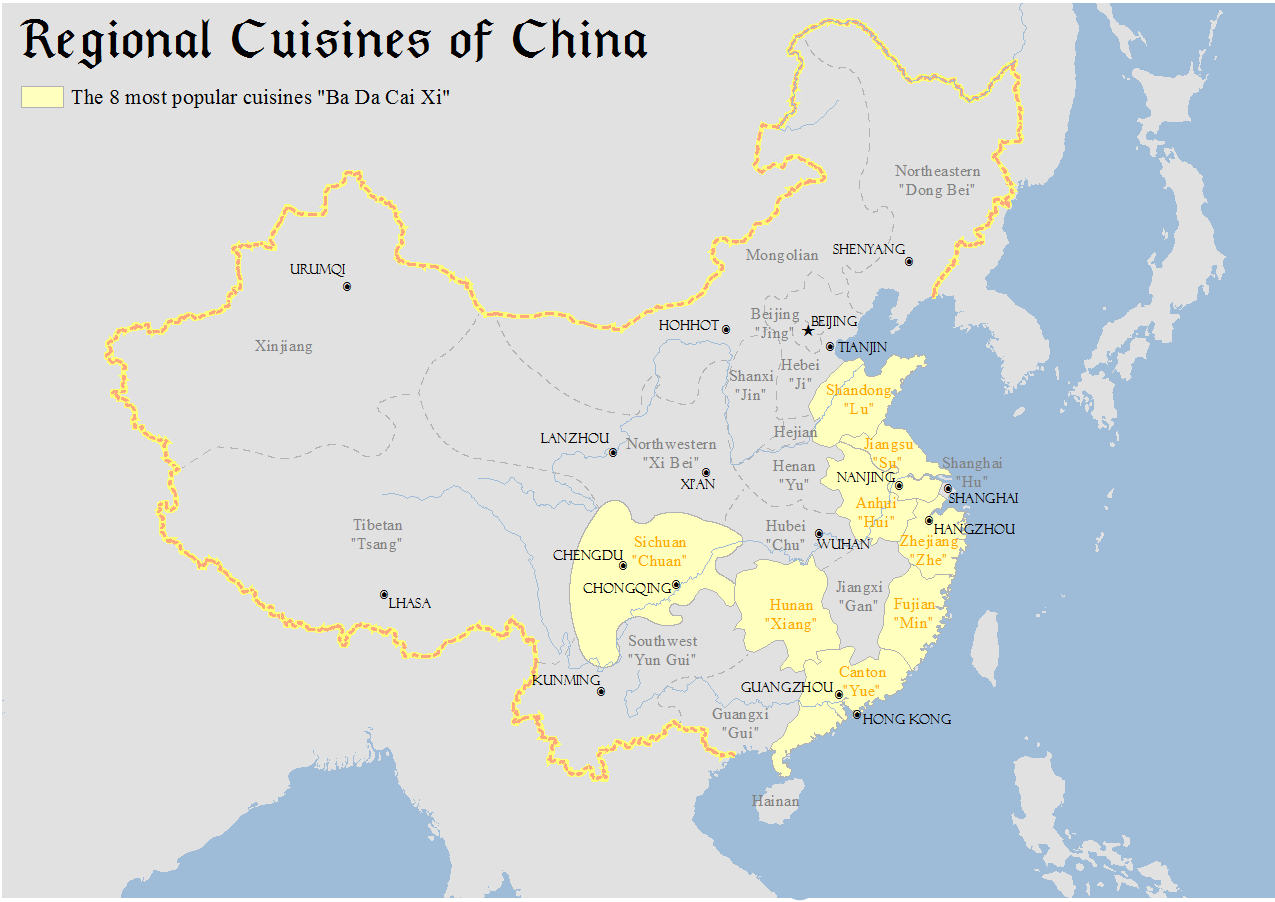
Map showing major regional cuisines of China

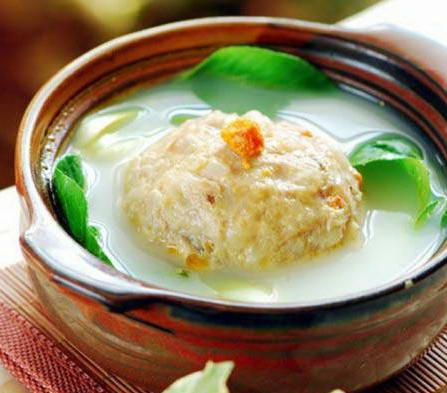
"Lion's head with crab meat" (蟹粉獅子頭) is a traditional eastern Chinese meatball soup.

Chinese cuisine exhibits an immense amount of regional diversity. A number of different styles contribute to Chinese cuisine but perhaps the best known and most influential are Cantonese cuisine, Shandong cuisine, Jiangsu cuisine (specifically Huaiyang cuisine) and Sichuan cuisine. These styles are distinctive from one another due to factors such as availability of resources, climate, geography, history, cooking techniques and lifestyle.

One style may favour the use of garlic and shallots over chili and spices, while another may favour preparing seafood over other meats and fowl. Jiangsu cuisine favours cooking techniques such as braising and stewing, while Sichuan cuisine employs baking. Zhejiang cuisine focuses more on serving fresh food, Fujian cuisine is famous for its seafood and soups and the use of spices, Hunan cuisine is famous for its hot and salty taste, Anhui cuisine incorporates wild ingredients for an unusual taste.

Based on the raw materials and ingredients used, the method of preparation and cultural differences, a variety of foods with different flavors and textures are prepared in different regions of the country. Many traditional regional cuisines rely on basic methods of preservation such as drying, salting, pickling and fermentation.

In addition, the "rice theory" attempts to describe cultural differences between north and south China; in the north, noodles are more consumed due to wheat being widely grown whereas in the south, rice is more preferred as it has historically been more cultivated there.

== Staple foods ==
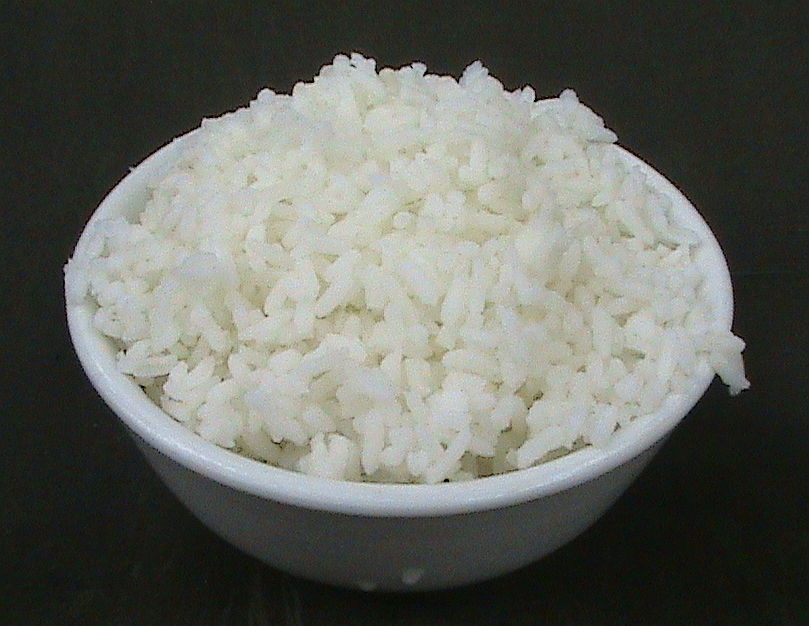
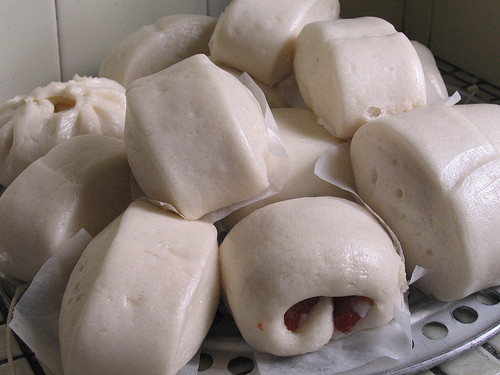
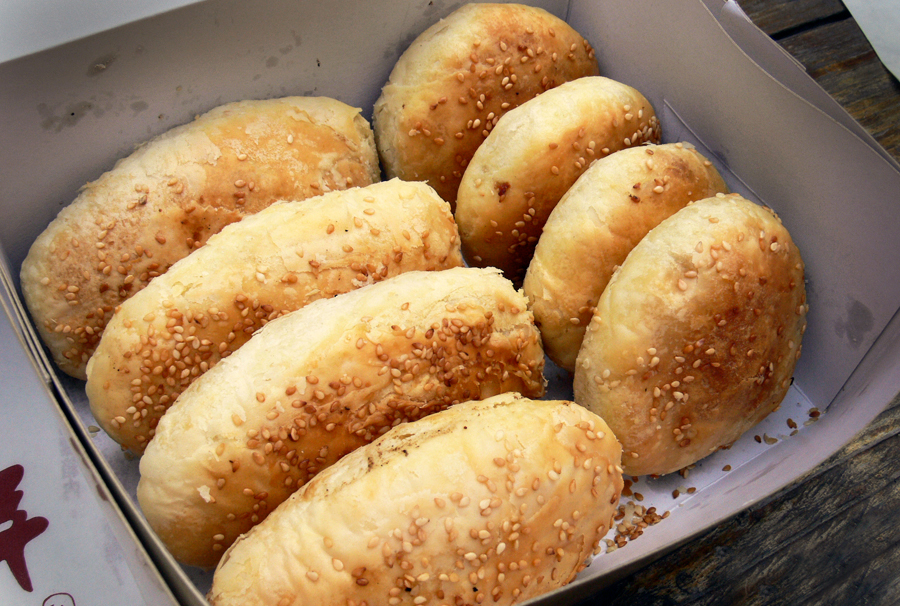
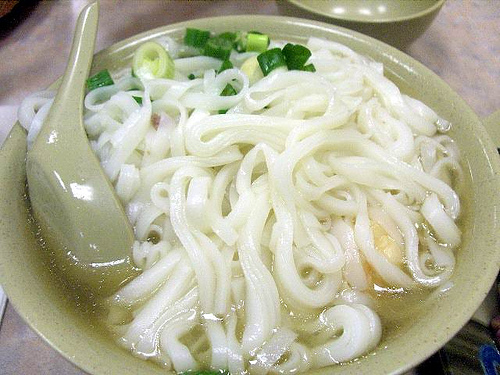
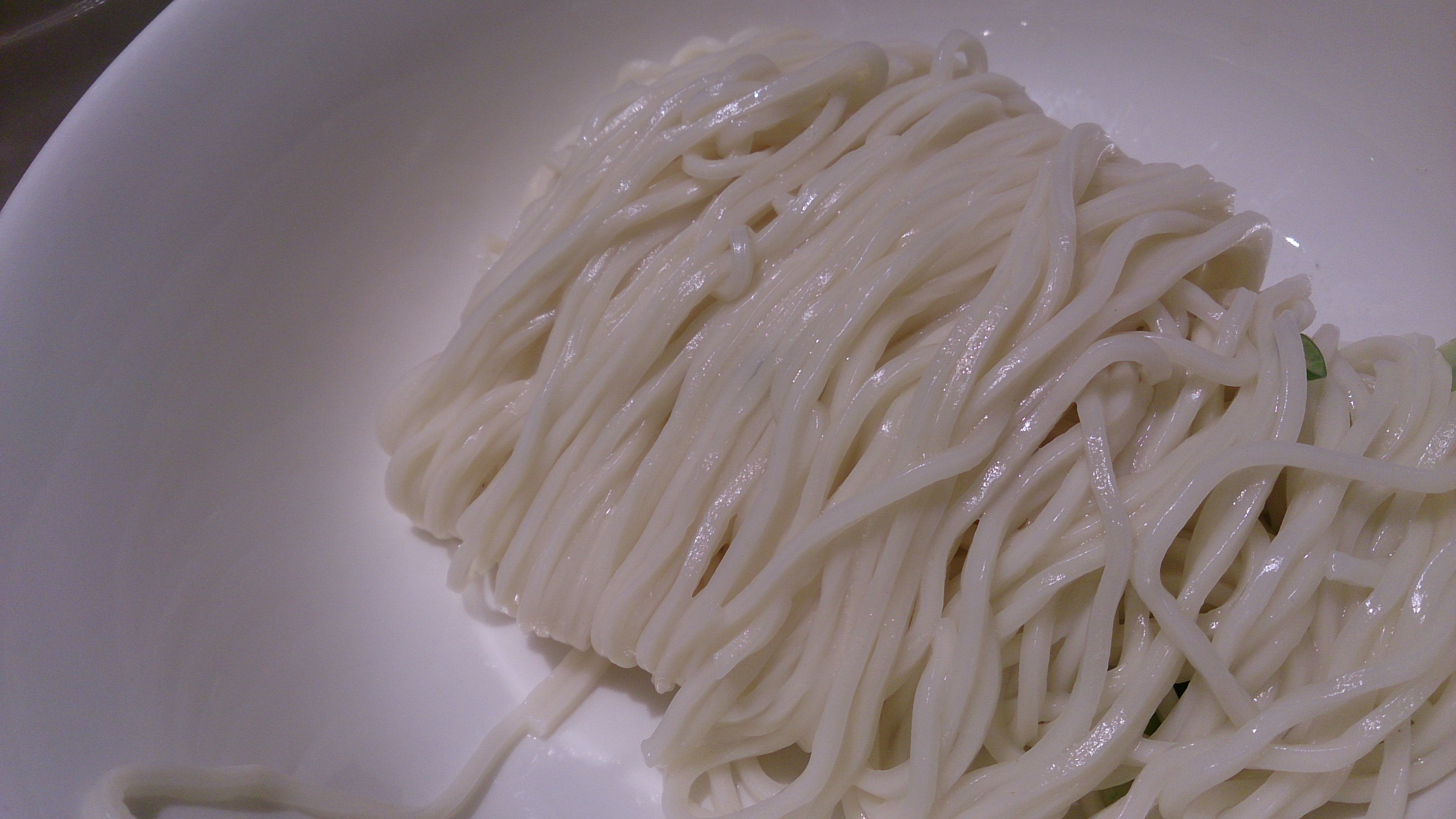
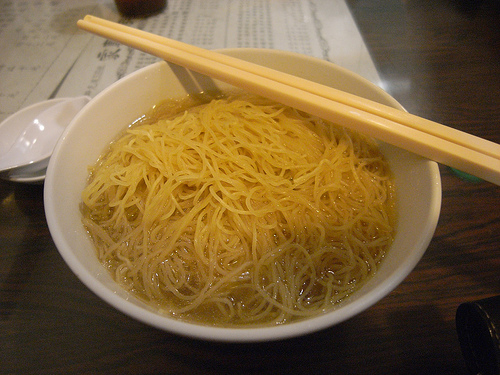
Staple foods in China: rice, breads and various kinds of noodles

Chinese ancestors successfully planted millet, rice, and other grains about 8,000 to 9,000 years ago. Wheat, another staple, took another three or four thousand years. For the first time, grains provided people with a steady supply of food. Because of the lack of various foods, Chinese people had to adapt to new eating habits. Meat was scarce, and so people cooked with small amounts of meat and rice or noodles.

=== Rice ===
Rice was domesticated in the Yangtze River basin in southern China approximately 9,000 years ago and is a primary staple food for people from rice farming areas in southern China. Steamed rice (Chinese: 米饭 mǐfàn), usually white rice, is the most commonly eaten form. People in South China also like to use rice to make congee as breakfast. Rice is also used to produce beer and vinegar. Glutinous rice ("sticky rice") is a variety of rice used in special dishes such as lotus leaf rice and glutinous rice balls.

=== Wheat ===
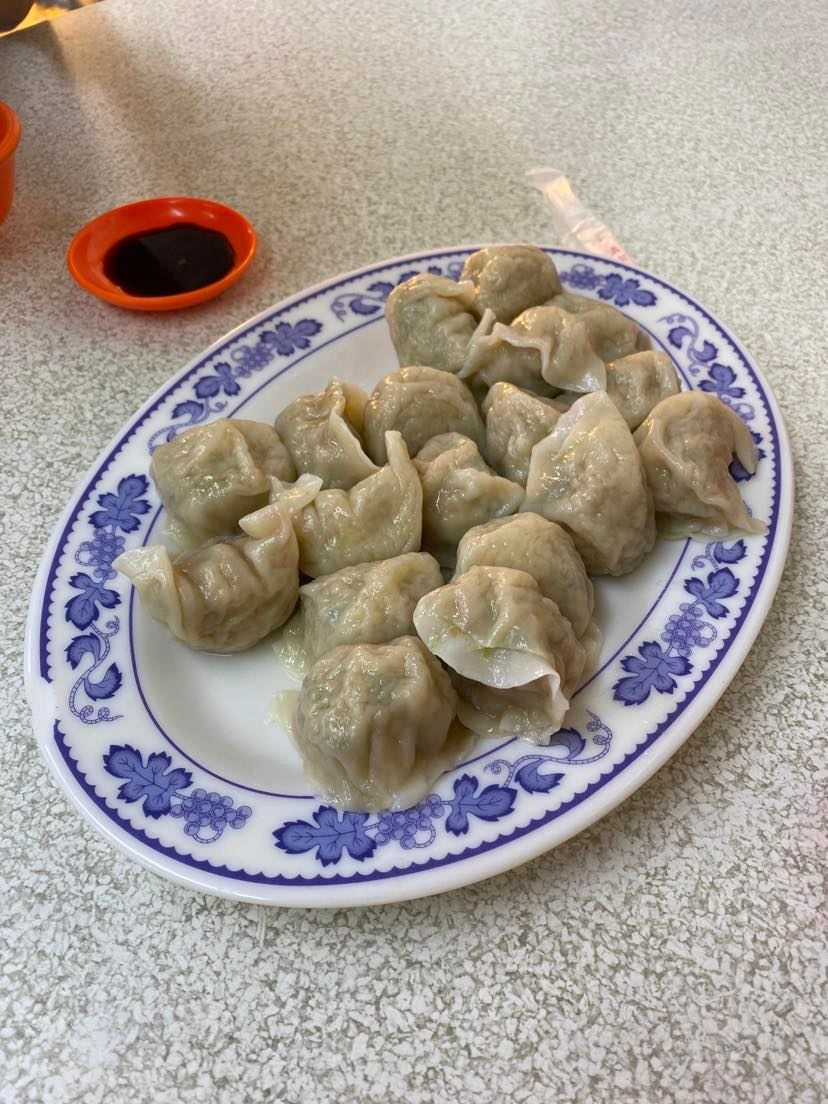
Jiaozi

In wheat-farming areas in Northern China, people largely rely on flour-based food, such as noodles, bing (bread), jiaozi (a kind of Chinese dumplings), and mantou (a type of steamed buns). Wheat likely "appeared in the lower Yellow River around 2600 Before Common Era (BCE), followed by Gansu and Xinjiang around 1900 BCE and finally occurred in the middle Yellow River and Tibet regions by 1600 BCE".

=== Noodles ===
Noodles (Chinese: 面/麵 miàn) were invented in China over 4,000 years ago and have since spread across the world. Chinese noodles come dry or fresh in a variety of sizes, shapes and textures and are often served in soups or fried as toppings. Some varieties, such as Shou Mian (寿面, literally noodles of longevity), is an avatar of long life and good health according to Chinese traditions. Noodles can be served hot or cold with different toppings, with broth, and occasionally dry (as is the case with mi-fen). Noodles are commonly made with rice flour or wheat flour, but other flours such as soybean are also used in minor groups. Some noodles names describe their methods of creation, such as the hand-pulled noodle.

== Soybean products ==
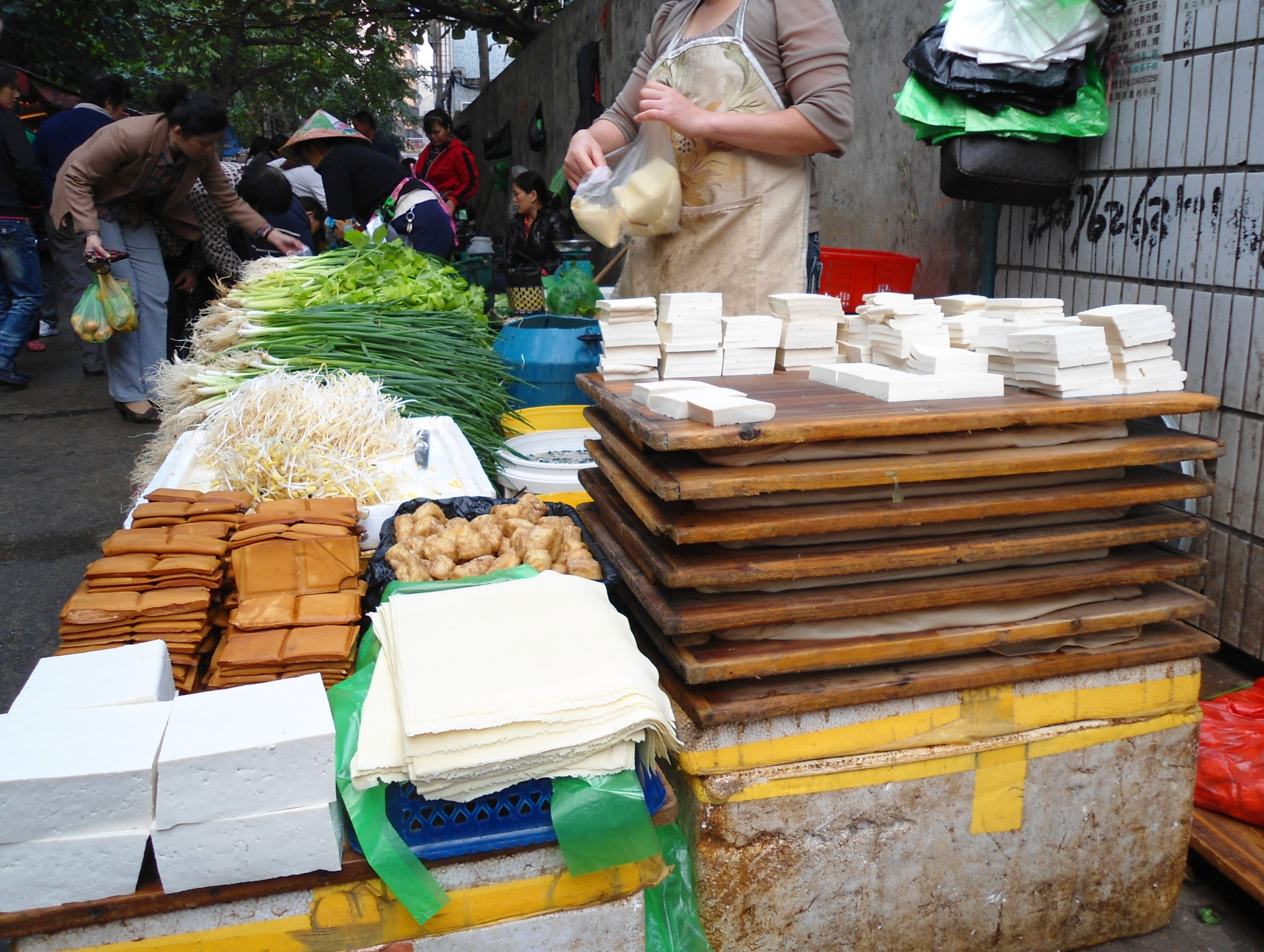
Several kinds of soybean products are sold in a farmer's market in Haikou, China.

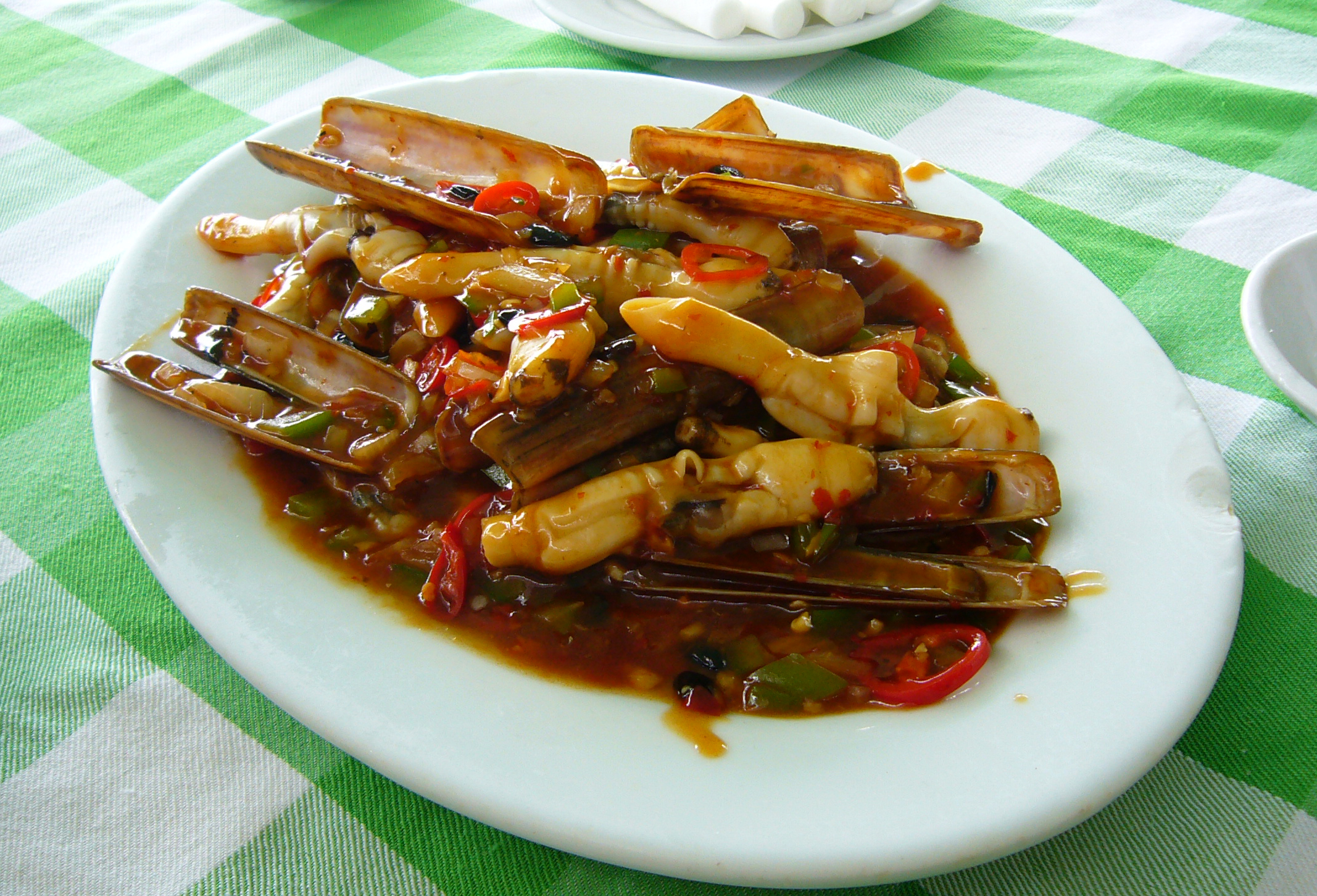
Stir-fried razor shell with douchi (fermented black soybeans) in Jiaodong style

Tofu is made of soybeans and is another popular food product that supplies protein. The production process of tofu varies from region to region, resulting in different kinds of tofu with a wide range of texture and taste. Other products such as soy milk, soy paste, soy oil, and fermented soy sauce are also important in Chinese cooking.

There are many kinds of soybean products, including tofu skin, smoked tofu, dried tofu, and fried tofu.

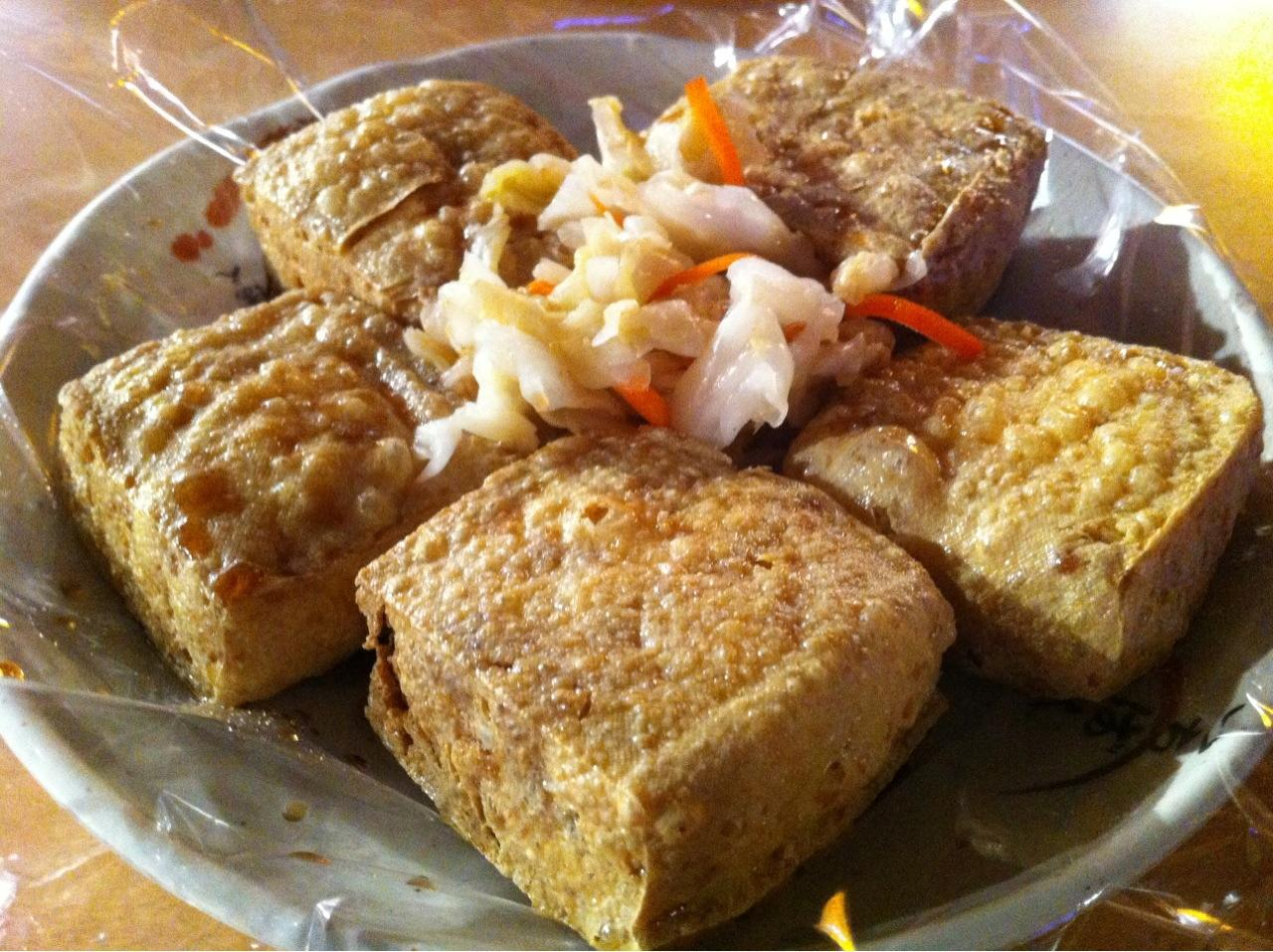
Stinky tofu

Stinky tofu is fermented tofu. Like blue cheese or durian, it has a very distinct, potent and strong smell, and is an acquired taste. Hard stinky tofu is often deep-fried and paired with soy sauce or salty spice. Soft stinky tofu is usually used as a spread on steamed buns.

Doufuru is another type of fermented tofu that has a salty taste. Doufuru can be pickled together with soy beans, red yeast rice or chili to create different color and flavor. This is more of a pickled type of tofu and is not as strongly scented as stinky tofu. Doufuru has the consistency of slightly soft blue cheese, and a taste similar to Japanese miso paste, but less salty. Doufuru can be used as a spread on steamed buns, or paired with rice congee.

Sufu is one other type of fermented tofu that goes through ageing process. The color (red, white, green) and flavor profile can determine the type of sufu it is. This kind of tofu is usually eaten alongside breakfast rice.

Soybean milk is soybean-based milk. It is a morning beverage, and it has many benefits to human health.

== Vegetables ==
Apart from vegetables that can be commonly seen, some unique vegetables used in Chinese cuisine include baby corn, bok choy, snow peas, Chinese eggplant, Chinese broccoli, and straw mushrooms. Other vegetables, including bean sprouts, pea vine tips, watercress, lotus roots, chestnuts, water chestnuts, and bamboo shoots, are also used in different cuisines of China.

Because of different climate and soil conditions, cultivars of green beans, peas, and mushrooms can be found in rich variety.

A variety of dried or pickled vegetables are also processed, especially in drier or colder regions where fresh vegetables were hard to get out of season.

== Herbs and seasonings ==
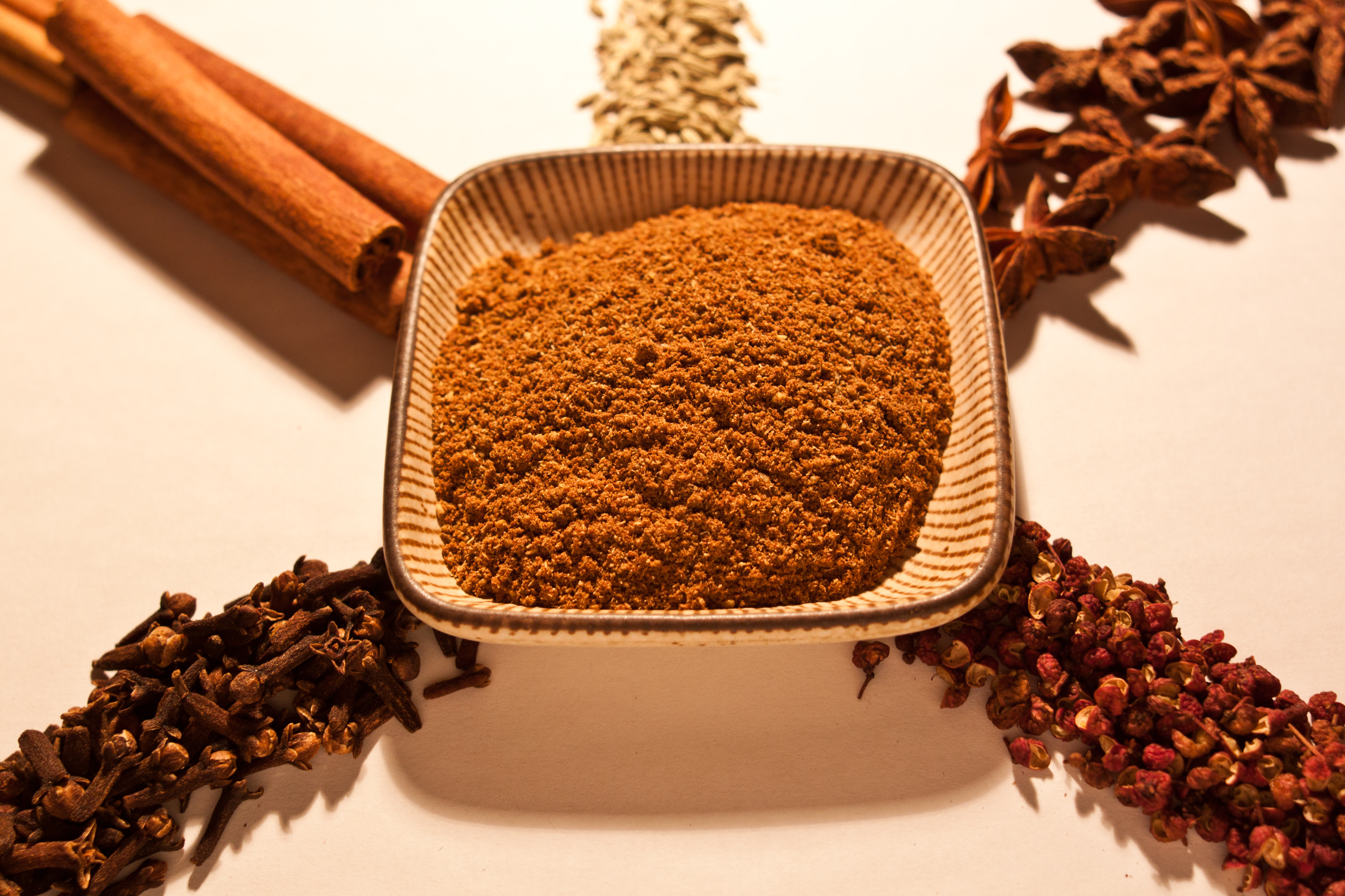
Ingredients of wu xiang fen (five-spice powder) are Sichuan peppercorn, cloves, cinnamon, fennel seeds, and star anise.

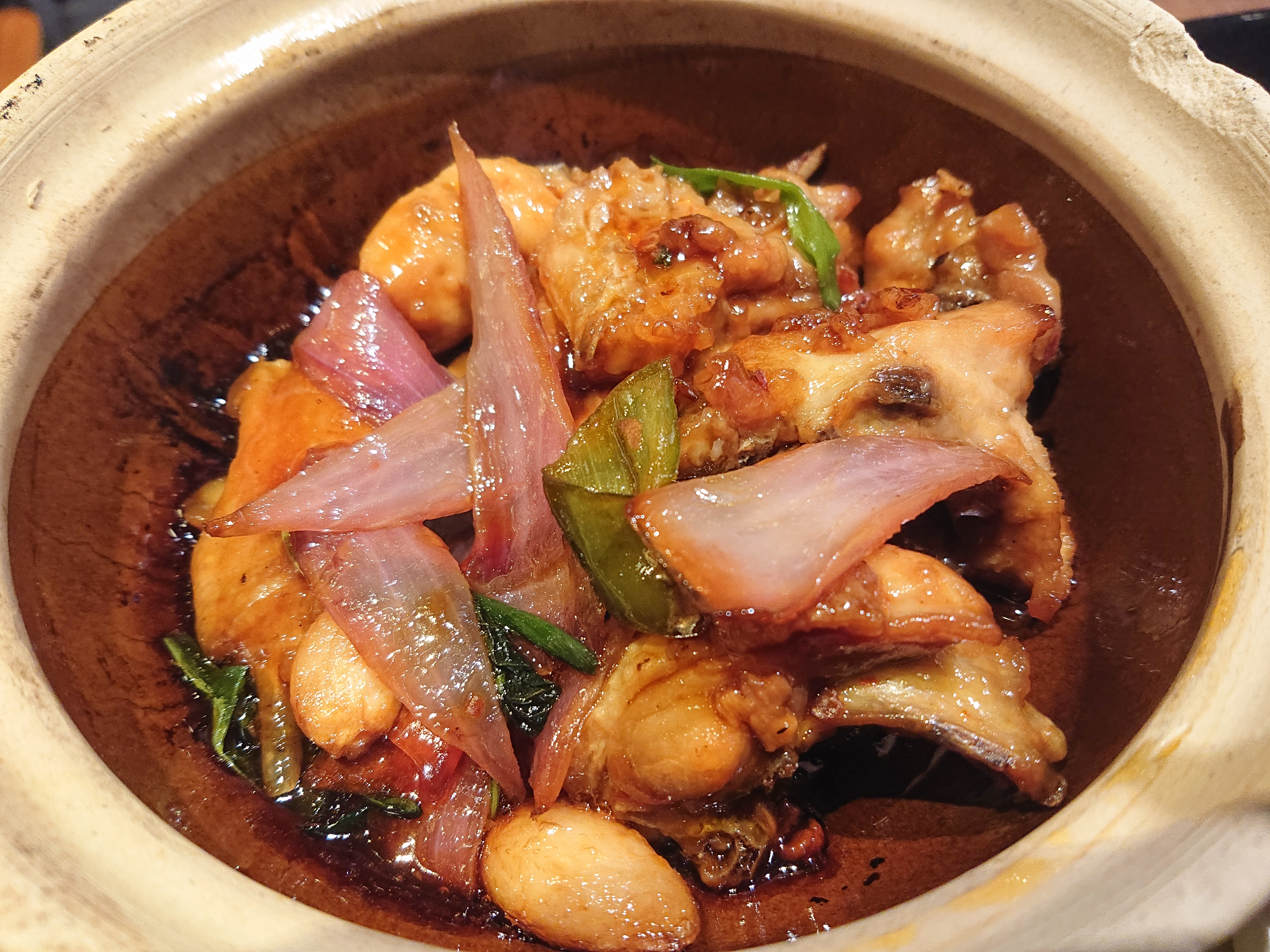
Sanbeiji (three-cup chicken) traditionally is prepared with lard, jiuniang (rice wine pudding) and soy sauce.

Seasonings such as fresh ginger root, garlic, scallion, cilantro and sesame are widely used in many regional cuisines. Sichuan peppercorns, star anise, cinnamon, fennel, cloves and white peppers and smart weed are also used in different regions.

To add extra flavor to the dishes, many Chinese cuisines also contain dried Chinese mushrooms, dried baby shrimp, dried tangerine peel, and dried Sichuan chillies.

When it comes to sauces, China is home to soy sauce, which is made from fermented soybeans and wheat. A number of sauces are also based on fermented soybeans, including hoisin sauce, ground bean sauce and yellow bean sauce. There are also different sauces preferred by regional cuisines, oyster sauce, fish sauce and furu (fermented tofu) are also widely used. Vinegar also has a variety with different flavors: clear rice vinegar, Chinkiang black rice vinegar, Shanxi vinegar, Henghe vinegar etc.

== Meat ==
The most commonly consumed meat in China is pork. As of at least 2024, China is the second largest beef consuming market in the world. Steakhouses and hot pot restaurants serving beef are becoming increasingly popular in urban China. Chinese consumers particularly value freshly slaughtered beef.

== Desserts and snacks ==
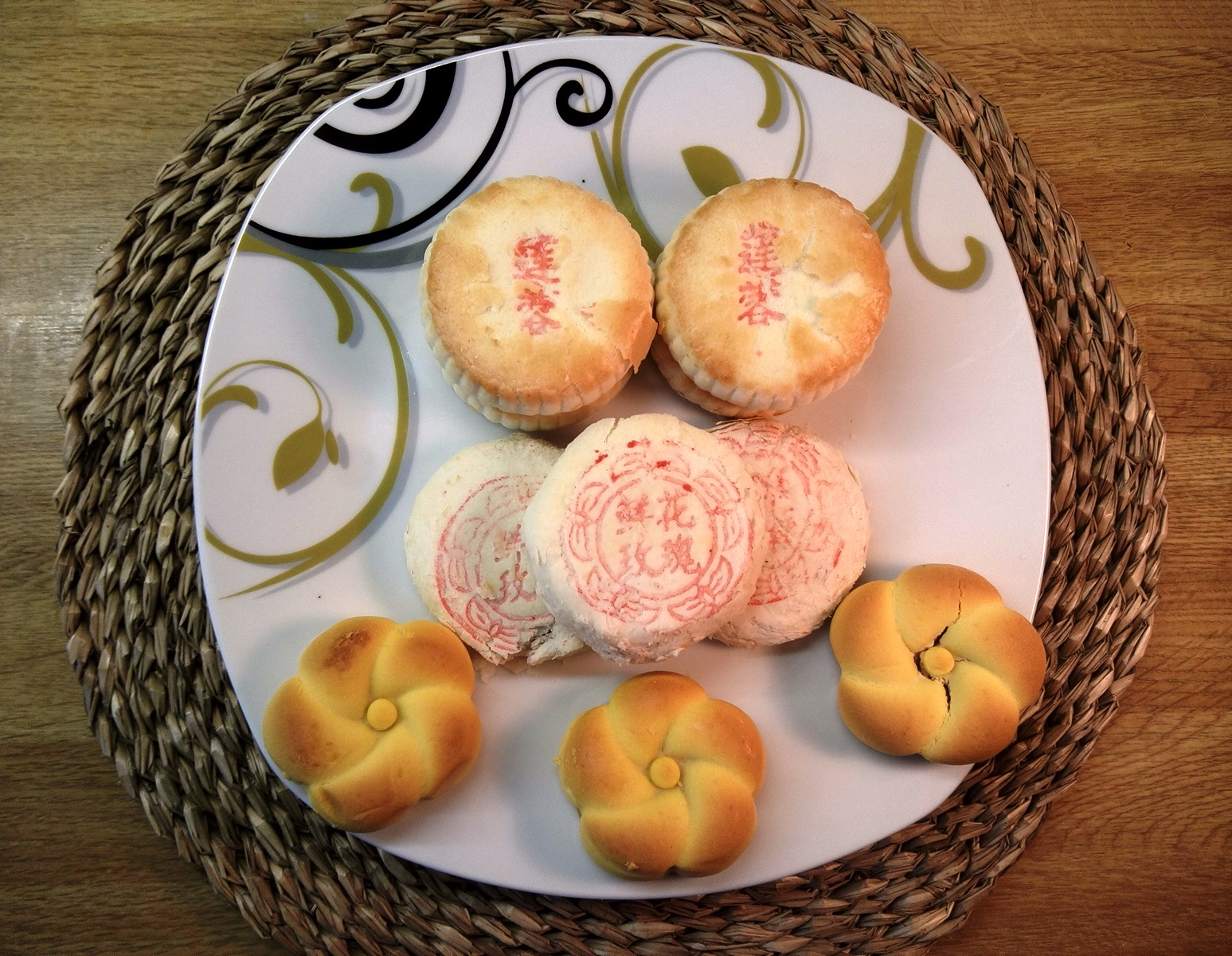
Different gāo diǎn (traditional Chinese pastry) with different stuffing, including lotus seed, rose, and mixture of pea and jackbean

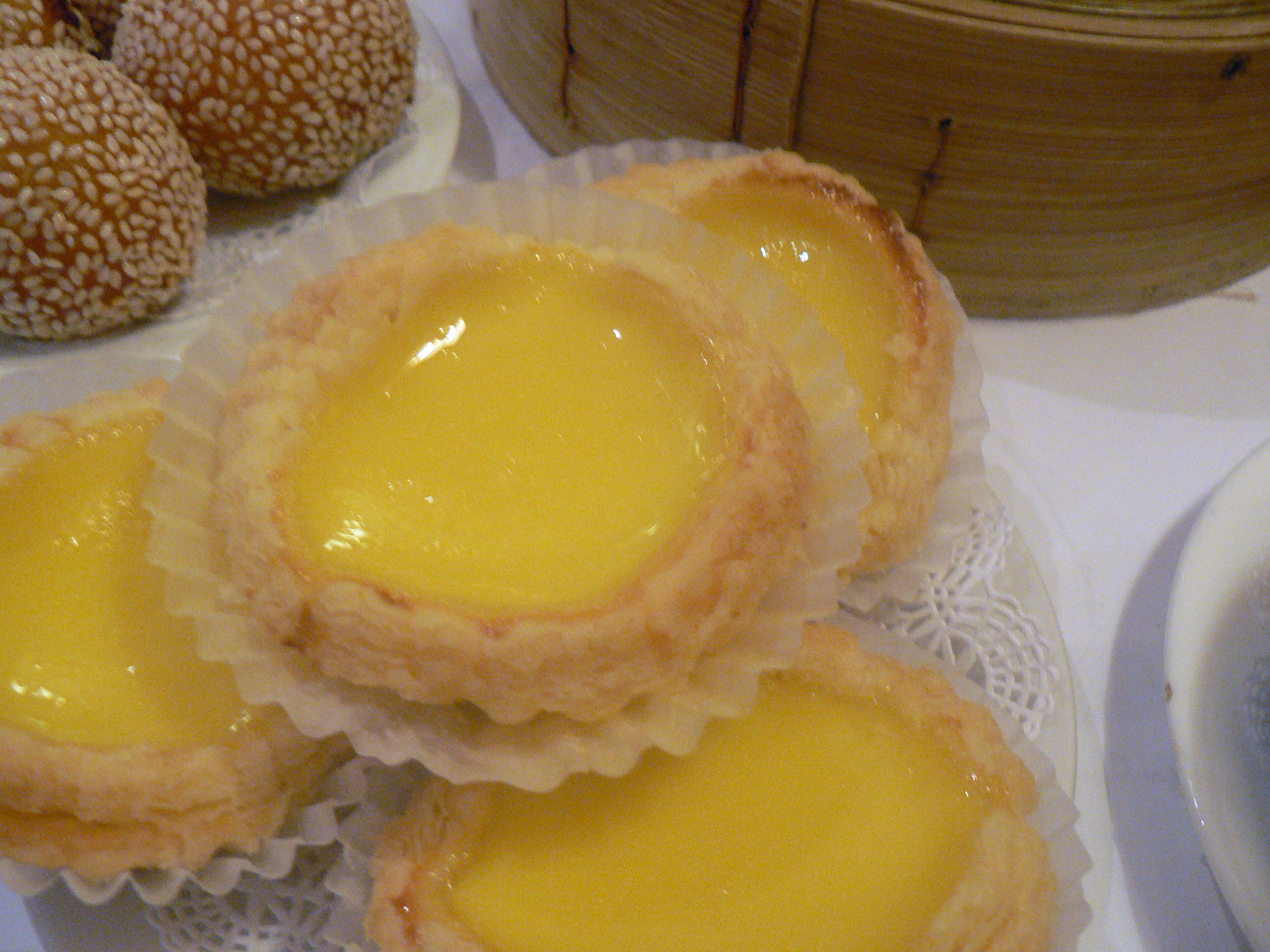
Egg custard tart is a type of xī diǎn (Western pastry) originally from Britain and Portugal that became popular in Hong Kong and Macau.

Generally, seasonal fruits serve as the most common form of dessert consumed after dinner.

Dim sum (点心), originally means a small portion of food, can refer to dessert, or pastries. Later to avoid disambiguation, tian dian (甜点) and gao dian (糕点) are used to describe desserts and pastries.

Traditionally, Chinese desserts are sweet foods and dishes that are served with tea, usually during the meal, or at the end of meals in Chinese cuisine.

Besides being served as dim sum along with tea, pastries are used for celebration of traditional festivals. The most famous one is moon cake, used to celebrate the Mid-Autumn Festival.

A wide variety of Chinese desserts are available, mainly including steamed and boiled sweet snacks. Bing is an umbrella term for all breads in Chinese, also including pastries and sweets. These are baked wheat-flour-based confections, with different stuffings including red bean paste, jujube, and a variety of others. Su (酥) is another kind of pastry made with more amount of oil, making the confection more friable. Chinese candies and sweets, called táng (糖) are usually made with cane sugar, malt sugar, honey, nuts, and fruit. Gao or Guo are rice-based snacks that are typically steamed and may be made from glutinous or normal rice.

Another cold dessert is called baobing, which is shaved ice with sweet syrup. Chinese jellies are known collectively in the language as ices. Many jelly desserts are traditionally set with agar and are flavoured with fruits, known as guodong (果冻), though gelatine based jellies are also common in contemporary desserts.

Chinese dessert soups are typically sweet and served hot.

European pastries are also seen in China, like mille-feuille, crème brûlée, and cheesecake, but they are generally not as popular because the Chinese preference of dessert is mildly sweet and less oily.

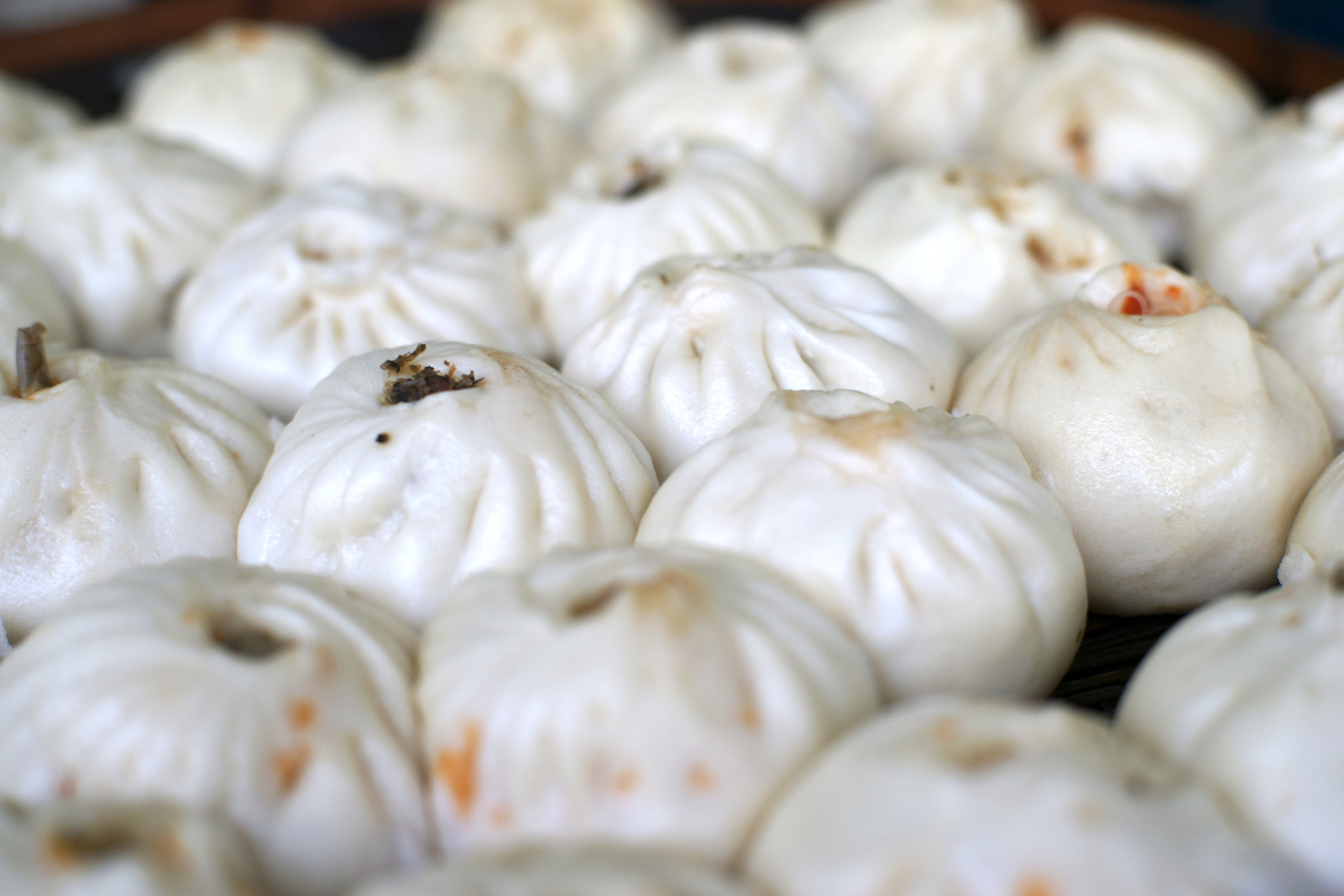
Bāozi are steamed buns containing savoury or sweet combinations of meat, vegetables, and mushrooms, traditionally associated with breakfast.

Many types of street foods, which vary from region to region, can be eaten as snacks or light dinner. Prawn crackers are an often-consumed snack in Southeast China.

=== Dairy products ===
Chinese in earlier dynasties evidently drank milk and ate dairy products, although not necessarily from cows, but kumis (fermented mare's milk) or goat's milk. Kumis was historically consumed in northern China.

China also has a number of native cheeses, mostly of the non-Han culinary traditions. Nguri, however, is a traditional cheese of southern China — mainly Fujian, Guangdong, and the area around Shanghai — historically consumed by the Han. It is a buffalo-milk cheese traditionally served in small amounts on congee. China's non-Han cheeses include Uyghur kurut, Mongolian byaslag and eezgii, Tibetian chhurpi, and Yi rushan and rubing.

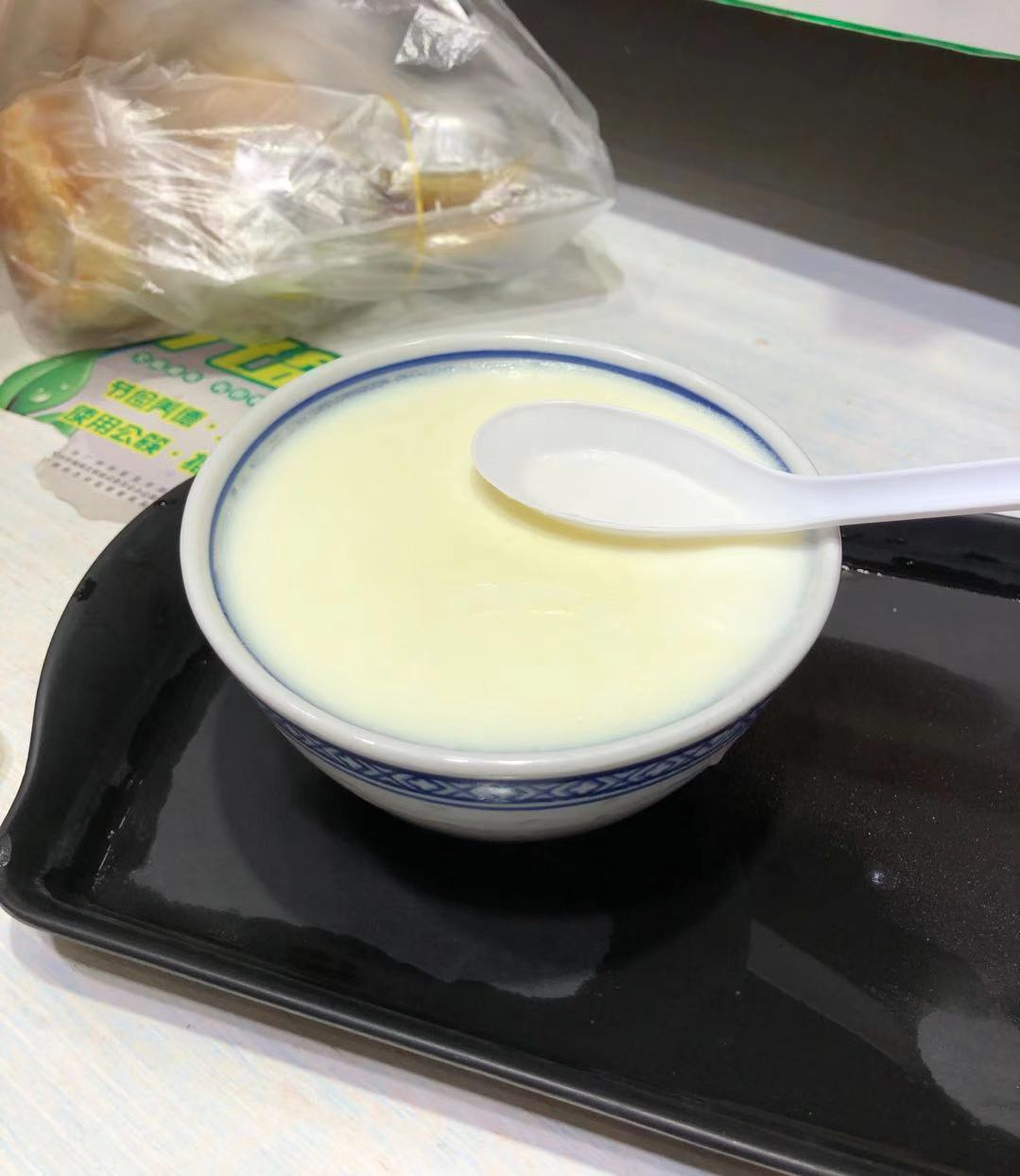
Double skin milk

Historically, many Chinese chefs tried not to use milk, because of the high rate of lactose intolerance among the Chinese population. However, today, dairy products are increasingly used in Chinese cuisine, such as the "double skin milk" dessert in Guangdong Province, yoghurt in Qinghai and Xinjiang, and milk candies such as White Rabbit. China has a wide variety of dairy desserts that are very popular.

== Cold dishes ==
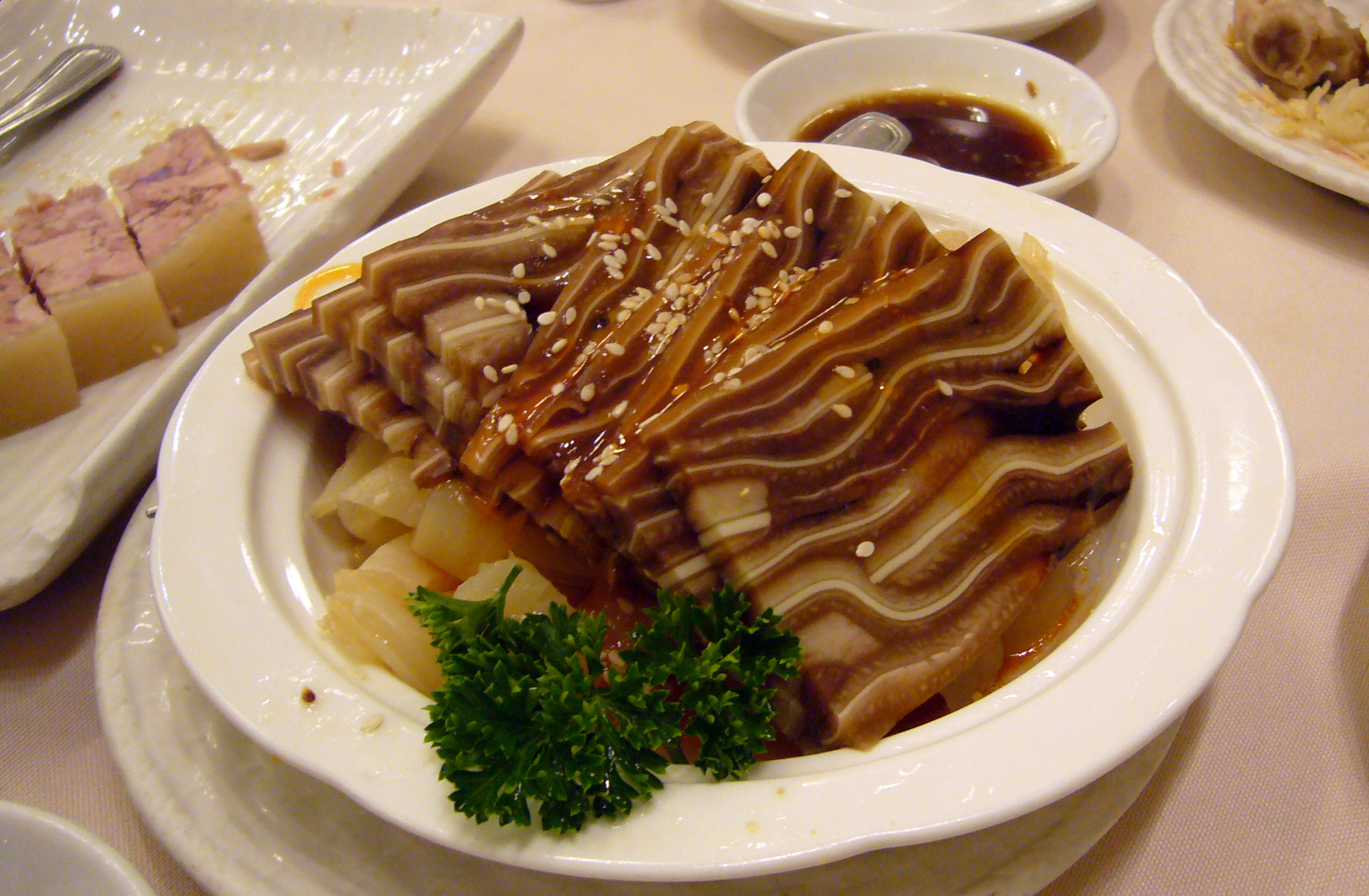
Stewed pig's ear as lou mei is usually served cold.

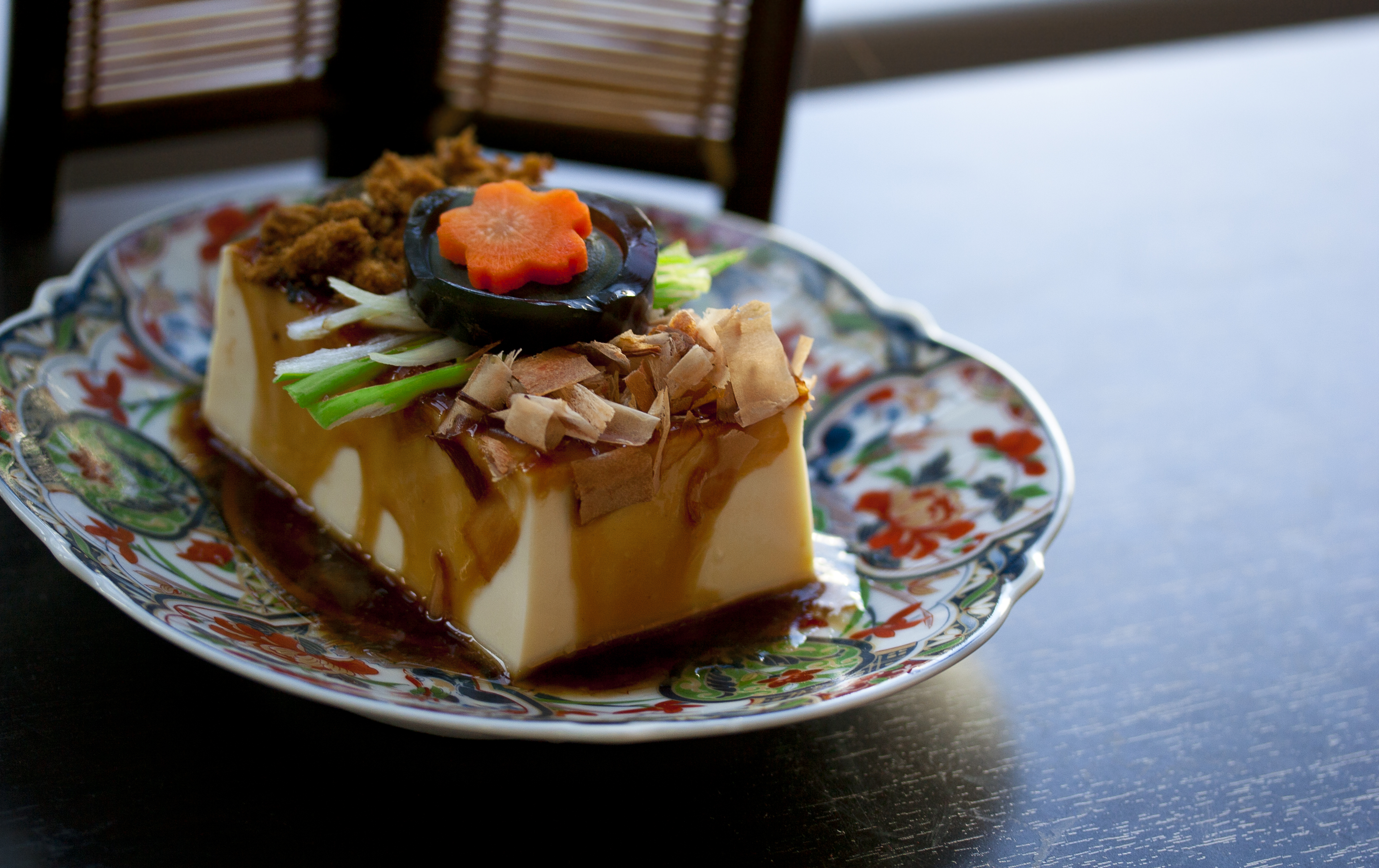
Pídàn dòufǔ (century egg and tofu)

Cold dishes are usually served before the main meal. Besides salad and pickles as appetizers, they can range from jelly, beancurd, noodle salad, cooked meat, and sausages to jellyfish or cold soups.

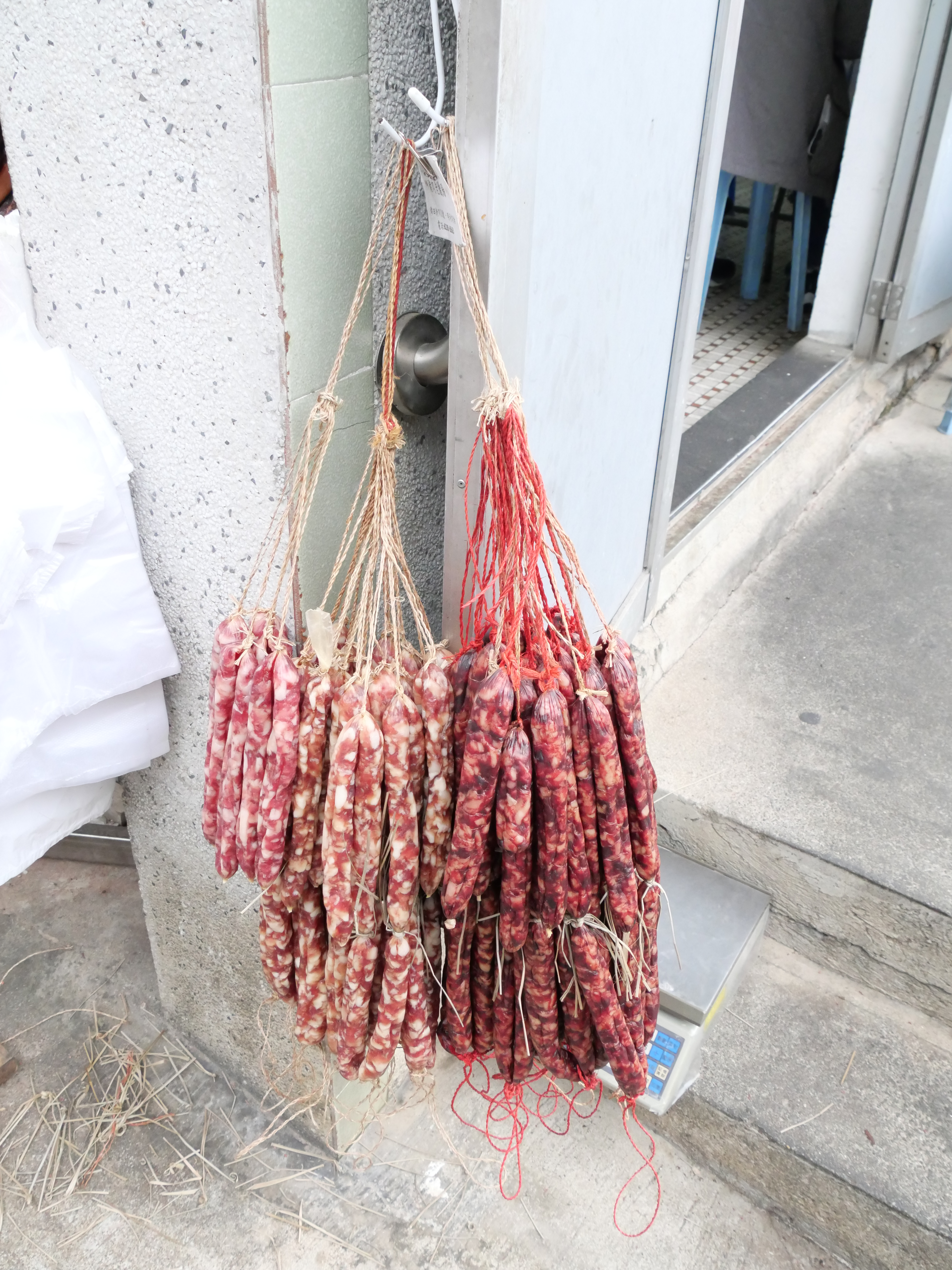
Dried Chinese sausages

Chinese sausages vary from region to region. The most common sausage is made of pork and pork fat. The flavor is generally salty-sweet in Southern China. In other parts of China, sausages are salted to be preserved. Chinese sausage is prepared in many different ways, including oven-roasting, stir-frying, and steaming.

== Soups ==
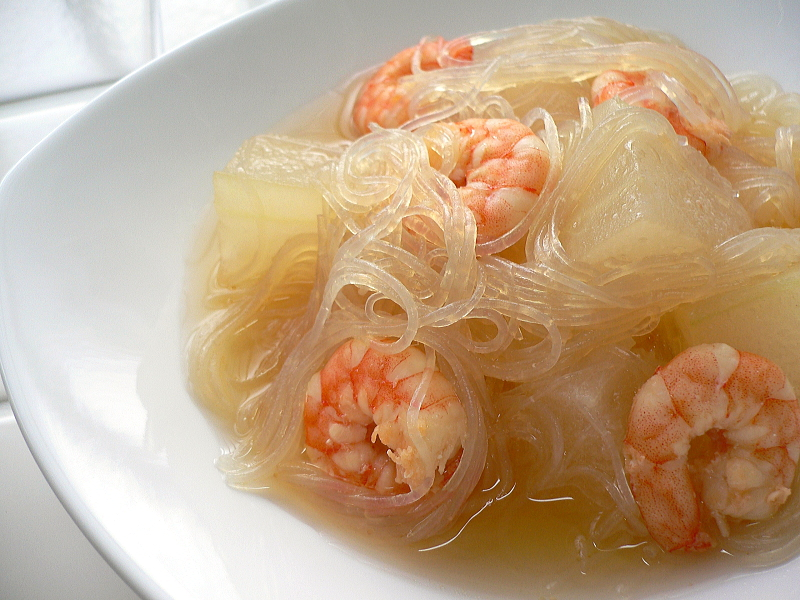
Dōngguā xiārén fěnsī tāng (winter melon, shrimp and cellophane noodle soup)

In some part of South China, soups (Chinese: 湯/汤 tāng) are served between the cold dishes and the main dishes. In other parts of China, soups are served between the main dish and staple foods, before desserts or fruit salad. There are many traditional Chinese soups, such as wonton soup, herbal chicken soup, hot and sour soup, winter melon soup, and so on.

== Drinks ==
Tea (Chinese: 茶 chá) plays an important role in Chinese dining culture. Baijiu and huangjiu are strong alcoholic beverages that are preferred by many people as well. Wine is not as popular as other drinks in China that are consumed while dining, although they are usually available in the menu.

=== Tea ===
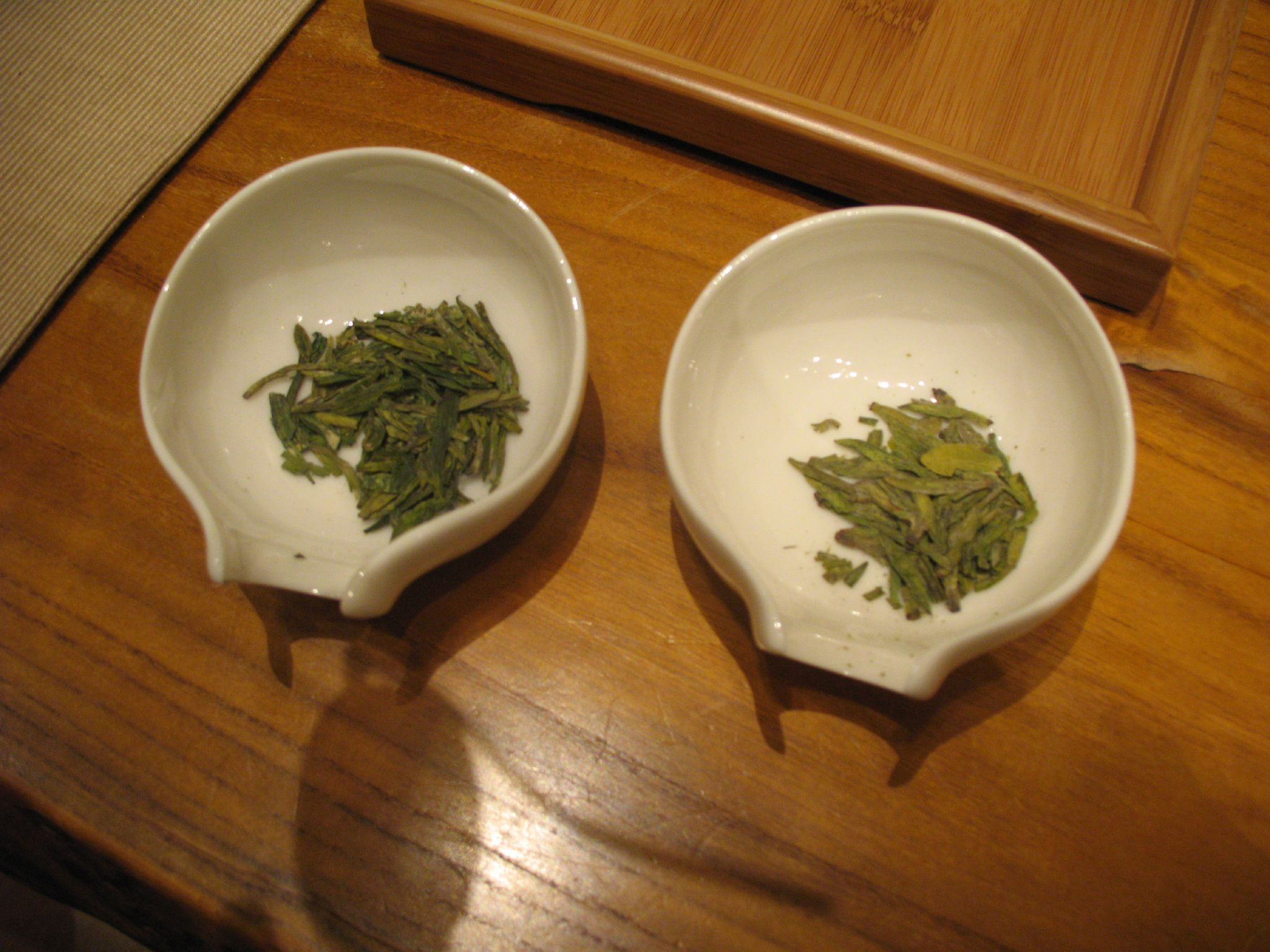
Longjing tea (lit. Dragon Well tea) is a variety of roasted green tea from Hangzhou, Zhejiang Province, China, where it is produced mostly by hand and has been renowned for its high quality, earning the China Famous Tea title.

As well as with dim sum, many Chinese drink their tea with snacks such as nuts, plums, dried fruit (in particular jujube), small sweets, melon seeds, and waxberry. China was the earliest country to cultivate and drink tea, which is enjoyed by people from all social classes. Tea processing began after the Qin and Han dynasties.

The different types of Chinese tea include red (known as "black tea" outside of East Asia), white, green, yellow, oolong, and black (often called "dark tea" in English to differentiate it from "black tea"). Chinese tea is often classified into several different categories according to the variety of the tea plant from which it is sourced, the region in which it is grown, and the method of production used.

Flavored and scented teas originated in China. Jasmine, osmanthus, chrysanthemum, and ginseng are popular varieties.

Historically, compressed tea dominated and powdered tea known as matcha would be made from it. This was later supplanted by loose-leaf tea. Fermented tea drinks like kombucha are believed to originate in China, but kombucha is now better known outside of China than within the country.

There are four major tea plantation regions: Jiangbei, Jiangnan, Huanan and the southwestern region. Well known types of green tea include Longjing, Huangshan Maofeng, Bilochun, Putuofeng Cha, and Liu'an Guapian. China is the world's largest exporter of green tea.

One of the most ubiquitous accessories in modern China, after a wallet or purse and an umbrella, is a double-walled insulated glass thermos with tea leaves in the top behind a strainer.

=== Alcoholic beverages ===
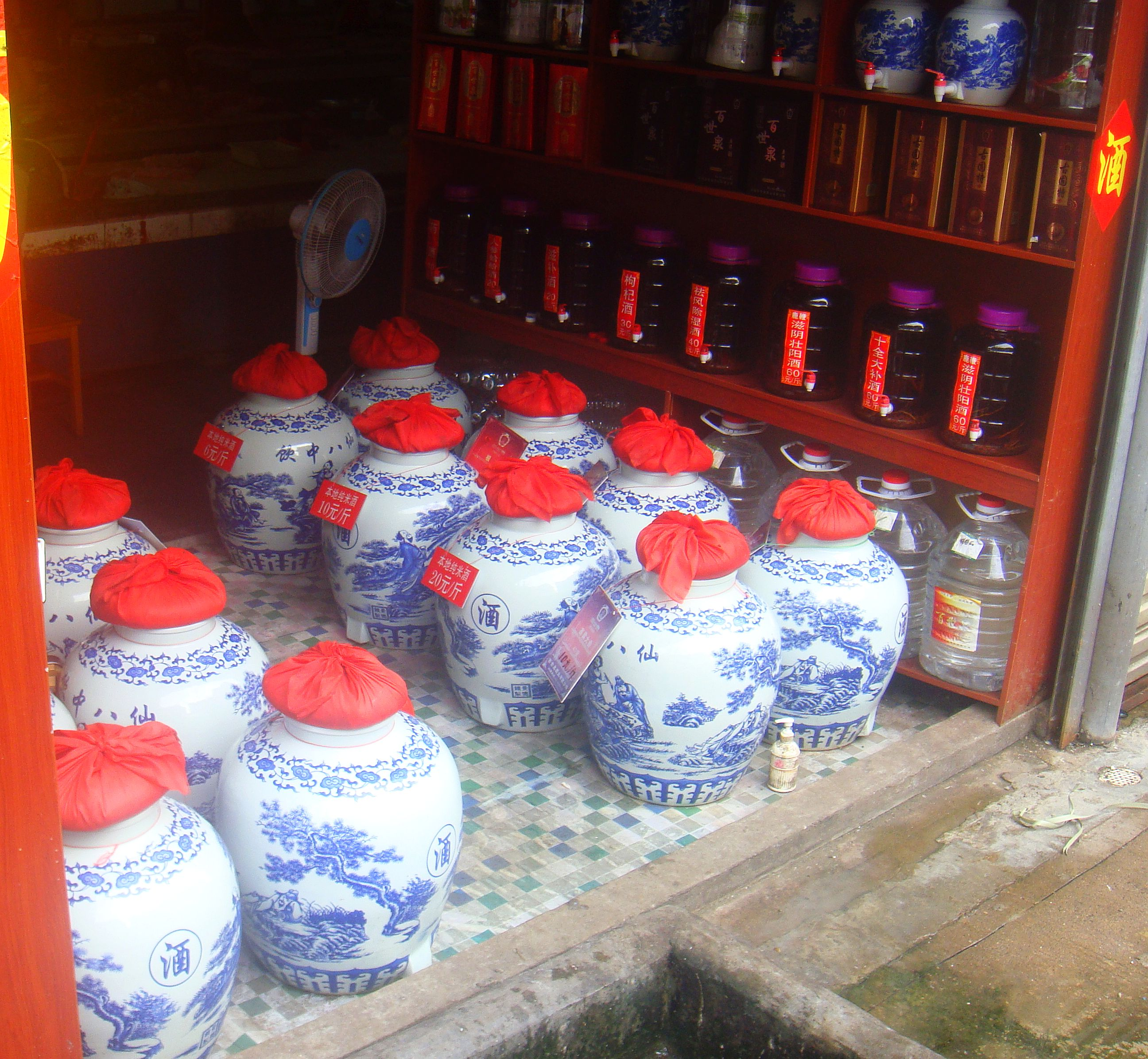
Baijiu

The importance of baijiu (lit. "white liquor") in China (99.5% of its alcoholic market) makes it the most-consumed alcoholic spirit in the world. It dates back to the introduction of distilling during the Song dynasty; can be made from wheat, corn, or rice; and is usually around 120 proof (60% ABV). The most ubiquitous brand is the cheap Er guo tou, but Mao Tai is the premium baijiu. Other popular brands include Kang, Lu Zhou Te Qu, and Wu Liang Ye.

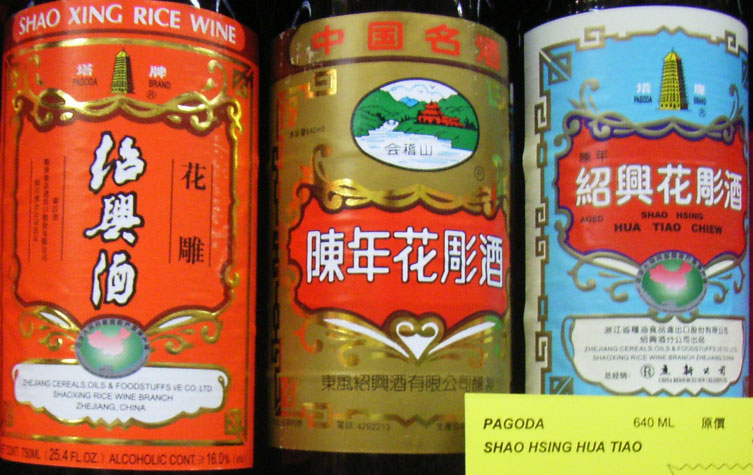
Huangjiu

Huangjiu (lit. "yellow liquor") is not distilled and is a strong rice wine (10–15% ABV). Popular brands include Shaoxing Lao Jiu, Shaoxing Hua Diao, and Te Jia Fan.

While fermented grain beverages have been brewed in China for over 9,000 years, it has been long overshadowed by stronger alcohol like Baijiu and Huangjiu.

In China, plum wine made from the plum blossom is called méijiǔ (梅酒).

=== Herbal drinks ===
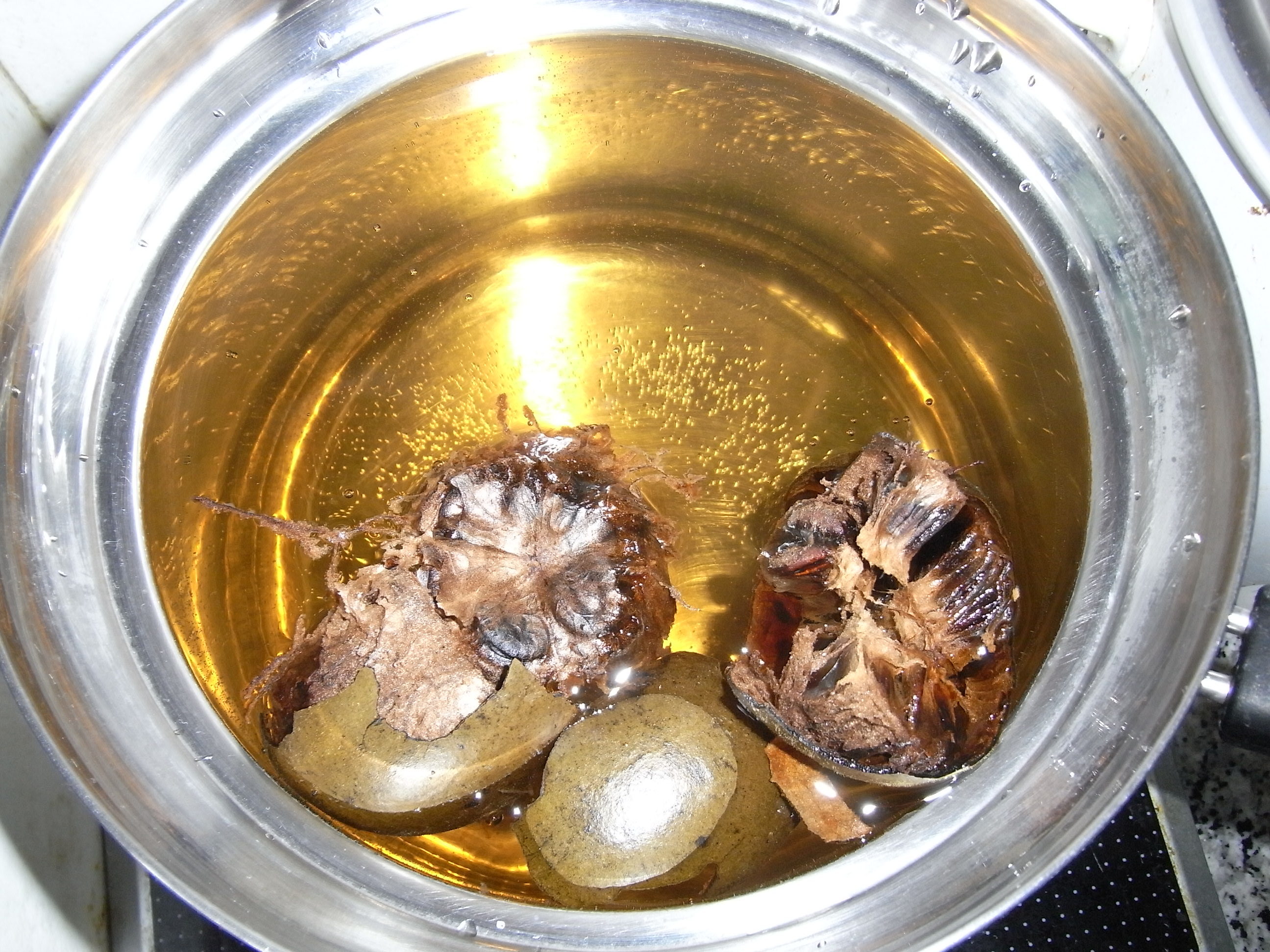
herb tea

Chinese herb tea, also known as medicinal herbal tea, is a kind of tea made from Chinese medicinal herbs.

=== Other beverages ===
Suanmeitang is a sweet Chinese beverage made from smoked plums. Soy milk, almond milk, walnut milk and coconut milk are also drunk during the meal in different regions. In some parts of China, hawthorn and jujube juice are preferred. A small shot of fruit vinegar is served as an appetizer in Shanxi.

Nai lao or Beijing yogurt is a drinkable yogurt traditional to northern China.

== Outside China ==
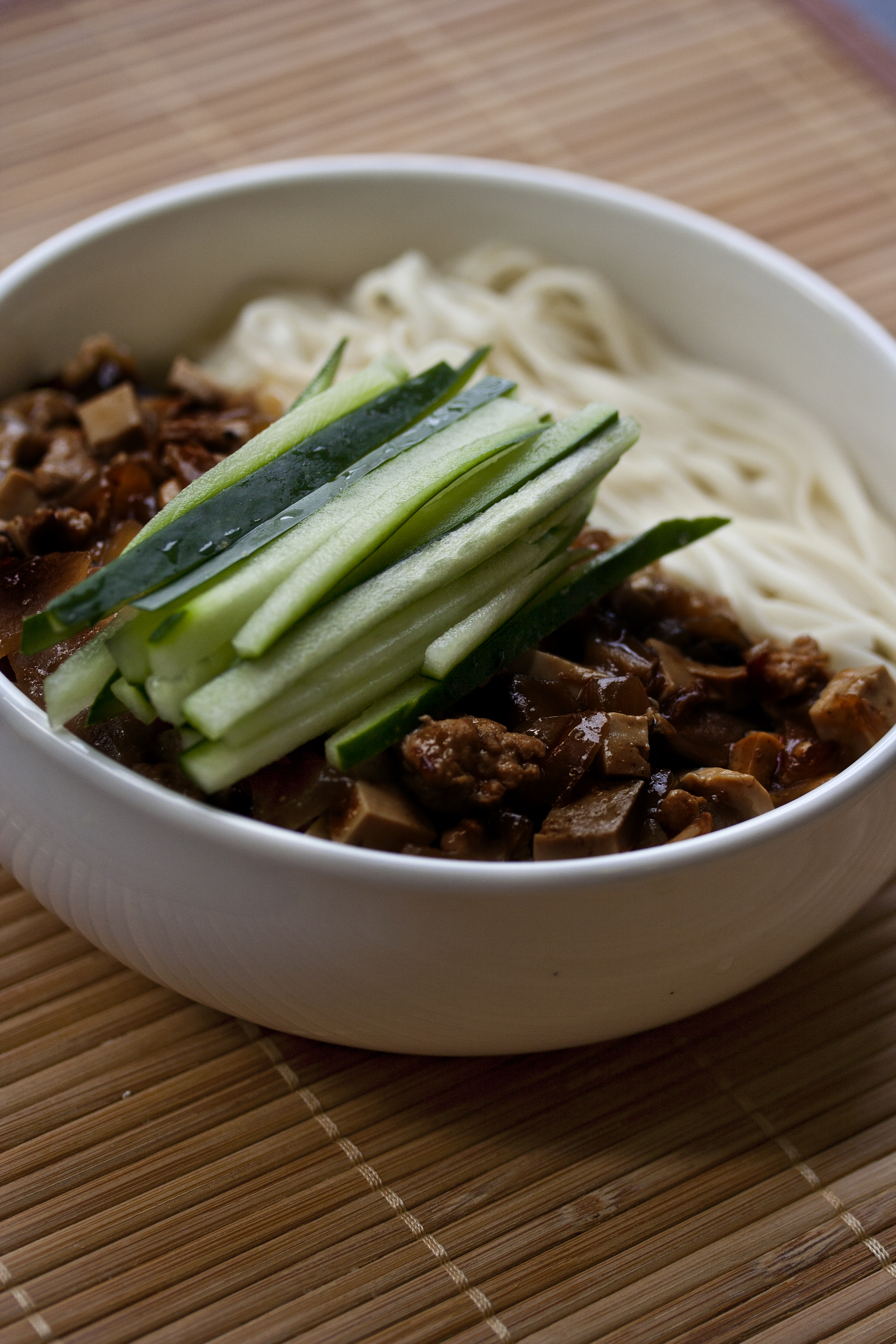
Zhájiàng Miàn (noodles with bean paste) is a traditional northern Chinese dish. It has spread to South Korea where it is known as Jajangmyeon.

Where there are historical immigrant Chinese populations, the style of food has evolved and been adapted to local tastes and ingredients, and modified by the local cuisine, to greater or lesser extents. This has resulted in a deep Chinese influence on other national cuisines such as Cambodian cuisine, Filipino cuisine, Singaporean cuisine, Thai cuisine and Vietnamese cuisine.

Chinatowns across the world have been instrumental in shaping the national cuisines of their respective countries, such as the introduction of a street food culture to Thailand in Bangkok Chinatown. There are also a large number of forms of fusion cuisine, often popular in the country in question. Some, such as ramen (Japanese Chinese cuisine), which originated in Yokohama Chinatown, have become popular internationally.

Deep-fried meat combined with sweet and sour sauce as a cooking style receives an enormous preference outside of China. Therefore, many similar international Chinese cuisines are invented based on sweet and sour sauce, including Sweet and sour chicken (Europe and North America), Manchurian chicken (India) or tangsuyuk (South Korea).

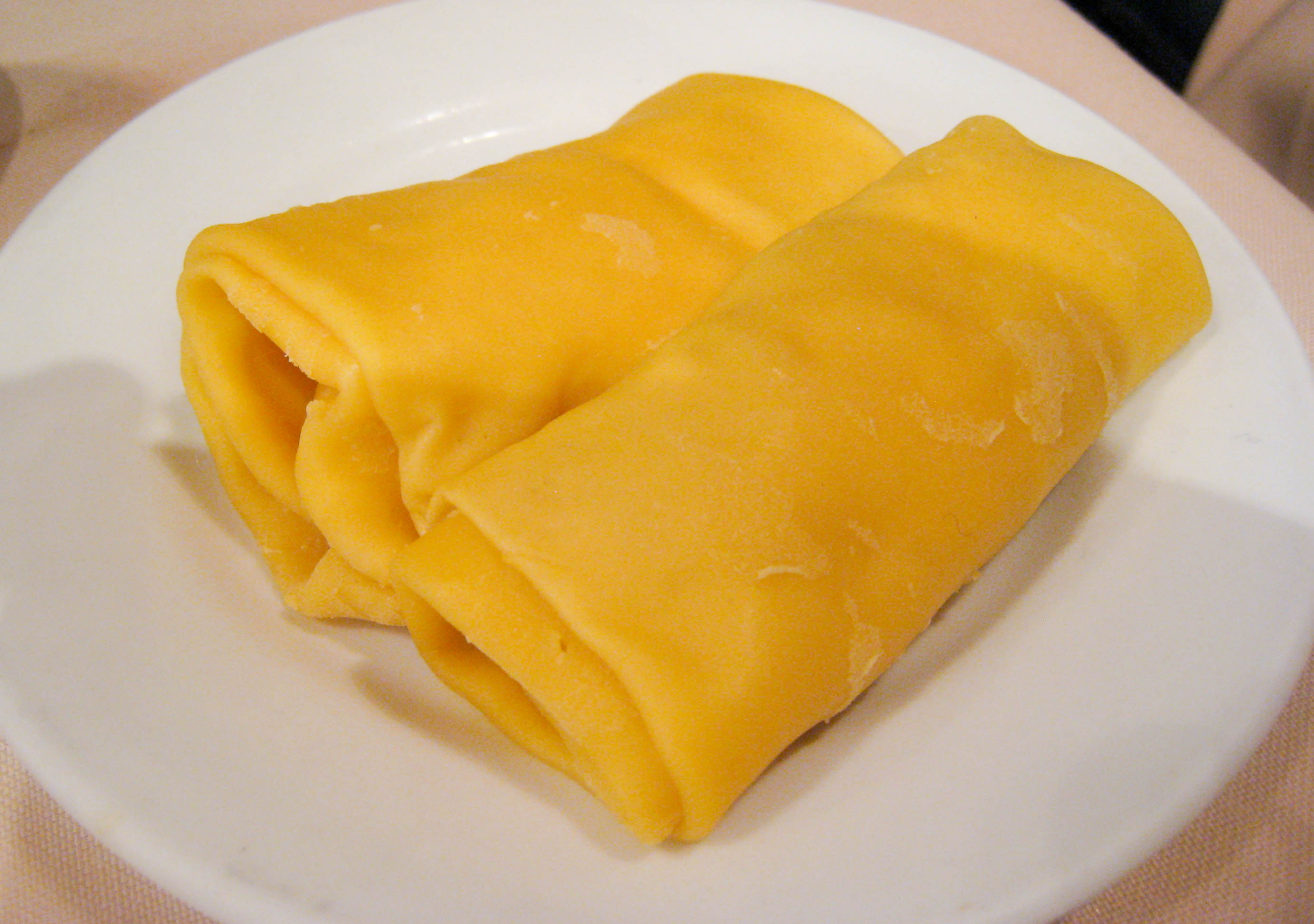
Mango pancake is an Australian Chinese dish, commonly as a dim sum at yum cha restaurants

Apart from the host country, the dishes developed in overseas Chinese cuisines are heavily dependent on the cuisines derived from the origin of the Chinese immigrants. In Korean Chinese cuisine, the dishes derive primarily from Shandong cuisine while Filipino Chinese cuisine is strongly influenced by Fujian cuisine. American Chinese cuisine has distinctive dishes (such as chop suey) originally based on Cantonese cuisine, which are more popular among non-Chinese Americans than with Chinese Americans themselves.

Chinese diaspora cuisine includes dishes that originated in mainland China but evolved abroad through migration and local adaptation. Examples include the St. Paul sandwich in the United States, bakmi ayam in Indonesia, pancit canton in the Philippines, and hủ tiếu in Vietnam, all of which reflect changes in ingredients, preparation methods, and eating habits shaped by regional tastes and availability.

- American Chinese cuisine
  - Chop suey, crab rangoon, General Tso's chicken, egg foo young, orange chicken
- Australian Chinese cuisine
  - Mango pancake, dim sim, XO sauce pipis
- Irish Chinese cuisine
  - Chicken balls, Spice bag
- Burmese Chinese cuisine
  - Kyay oh, Sigyet khauk swè
- Canadian Chinese cuisine
  - Ginger beef
- Caribbean Chinese cuisine
  - Cha chee kai, bangamary ding
- Filipino Chinese cuisine
  - Arroz caldo, Batchoy, Pancit
- Indian Chinese cuisine
  - Gobi manchurian, Manchow soup
- Indonesian Chinese cuisine
  - Bakso, Cap cai, Lumpia, Mie ayam, Mie goreng, Swikee, Siomay, Kepiting saus tiram
- Japanese Chinese cuisine, Shippoku
  - Champon, Ramen, Gyoza, Kakuni, Tenshindon
- Korean Chinese cuisine
  - Jajangmyeon, jjamppong, hotteok, Tangsuyuk
- Chinese Latin American cuisine
  - Peruvian Chinese cuisine (Chifa)
    - Arroz chaufa, Lomo saltado
  - Puerto Rican Chinese cuisine
    - Carne Ahumada
- Malaysian Chinese cuisine/Singapore Chinese cuisine
    - Hainanese chicken rice, Bak kut teh, Heong Peng, Yam ring, Kaya toast (often seen in kopitiam)
  - Peranakan cuisine
    - Laksa (include Curry mee), Ayam buah keluak, Pie tee
- New Zealand Chinese cuisine
- Pakistani Chinese cuisine
  - Jalfrezi
- Thai Chinese cuisine
  - Pad thai, Khao soi, Phat kaphrao, Thai suki
- Cambodian Chinese cuisine
  - Kuyteav, Lort cha
- Vietnamese Chinese cuisine
  - Banh bao

== Dining etiquette ==
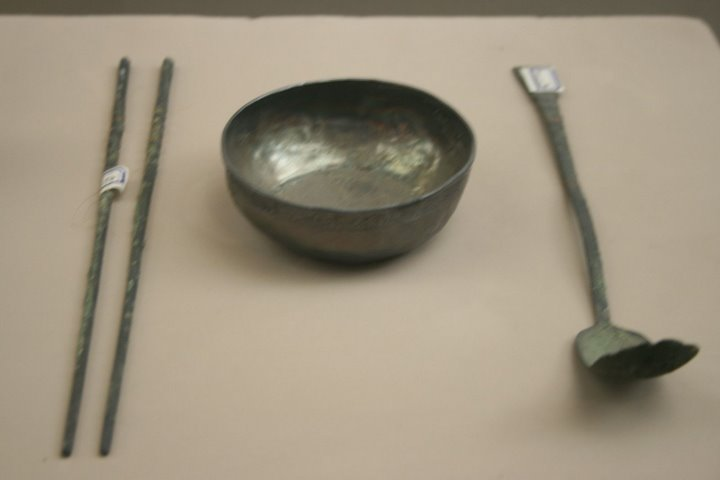
Silverware from the Song dynasty (10th–13th centuries): Chopsticks, bowl and spoon

Youths should not begin eating before their elders do. When eating from a bowl, one should not hold it with its bottom part, because it resembles the act of begging. Chopsticks are the main eating utensils for Chinese food, which can be used to cut and pick up food. When someone is taking a break from eating at the table, they should not put the chopstick into the rice vertically, because it resembles the Chinese traditional funeral tribute, which involves putting chopsticks inside a bowl of rice vertically. It is considered inappropriate to use knives on the dining table. Chopsticks should not be waved around in the air or played with. Food should first be taken from the plate in front. It is considered impolite to stare at a plate. Watching TV, using mobile phones or doing other activities while eating is considered in poor taste. If an older person puts food in a younger person's bowl, the younger person should thank them.

Chinese culture has guidelines in how and when food are eaten. Chinese people typically eat three meals a day, consisting of breakfast, lunch, and dinner. Breakfast is served around 6–9am, lunch is served around 12–2pm, and dinner is served around 6–9pm. A late night, fourth meal of the day is known as siu yeh and served from 9pm-4am, which is similar to the Western concept of supper. Within the Chinese culture, families do follow different traditions. In some families, the elderly members and youngsters get their meal first, then the mother and father, and then the children and teenagers. Other families have the male and female eat separately at different seating area. Whatever tradition the family decide to follow, it is intended to show respect to members of the family.

== Relation to Chinese philosophy and religion ==
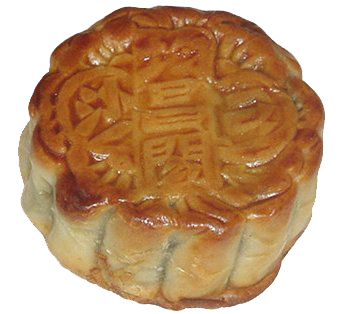
Mooncake, eaten during the Mid-Autumn Festival

Food plays various roles in social and cultural life. In Chinese folk religion, ancestor veneration is conducted by offering food to ancestors and Chinese festivals involve the consumption and preparation of specific foods which have symbolic meanings attached to them. Specific religions in China have their own cuisines such as the Taoist diet, Buddhist cuisine and Chinese Islamic Cuisine.

The Kaifeng Jews in Henan province once had their own Chinese Jewish cuisine but the community has largely died out in the modern era and not much is known about the specifics of their cuisine but they did influence foods eaten in their region and some of their dishes remain. Chinese dishes with purported Kaifeng Jewish roots include Kaifeng xiao long bao, Mayuxing bucket-shaped chicken, Chrysanthemum hot pot, and Four Treasures.

Food also plays a role in daily life. The formality of the meal setting can signify what kind of relationship people have with one another, and the type of food can indicate ones' social status and their country of origin. In a formal setting, up to sixteen of any combination of hot and cold dishes would be served to respect the guests. On the other hand, in a casual setting, people would eat inexpensive meals such as at food stalls or homemade food. The typical disparity in food in the Chinese society between the wealthy and everyone below that group lies in the rarity and cost of the food or ingredient, such as shark fins and bear paws.

Depending on whether one chooses to have rice or a meal that is made of wheat flour such as bread or noodles as their main source of food, people within a similar culture or of a different background can make an assumption of the other's country of origin from the south or north of China. Different foods have different symbolic meanings. Mooncakes and dumplings are symbolic of the Mid-autumn festival and the Spring Festival, respectively. Pear symbolizes bad luck due to its similarity in pronunciation of 'away' in the native language and noodle means living a long life for its length.

In Chinese philosophy, food frequently conveys a message. A Chinese philosophy I Ching says, "Gentlemen use eating as a way to attain happiness. They should be aware of what they say, and refrain from eating too much."

== See also ==
- A Bite of China by CCTV
- The eight major traditions of Chinese cuisine
  - Shandong cuisine
  - Sichuan cuisine
  - Cantonese cuisine
  - Fujian cuisine
  - Jiangsu cuisine
  - Zhejiang cuisine
  - Hunan cuisine
  - Anhui cuisine
- Other traditions in Chinese cuisine
  - Beijing cuisine
    - Chinese imperial cuisine
  - Shanghai cuisine
  - Huaiyang cuisine
  - Hubei cuisine
  - Jiangxi cuisine
  - Henan cuisine
  - Shanxi cuisine
  - Shaanxi cuisine
  - Chinese Islamic cuisine
    - Uyghur cuisine
  - Mongolian cuisine
  - Manchu cuisine
  - Northeastern Chinese cuisine
  - Guizhou cuisine
  - Tibetan cuisine
  - Yunnan cuisine
  - Teochew cuisine
- List of Chinese bakery products
- List of Chinese desserts
- List of Chinese dishes
- List of Chinese sauces
- List of Chinese soups
- Chinese regional cuisine
- Chinese food therapy
- History of Chinese cuisine
- Customs and etiquette in Chinese dining
- Chinese cooking techniques
- Chinese Cuisine Training Institute
- List of restaurants in China
- Pizza in China

== Sources ==
- Anderson, Eugene N. (1988). The Food of China. New Haven: Yale University Press. ISBN 0300047398.
- Gernet, Jacques (1962). Daily Life in China on the Eve of the Mongol Invasion, 1250–1276. Stanford University Press. ISBN 0-8047-0720-0.
