= Hui cuisine =

Hui cuisine may refer to:

- Chinese Islamic cuisine (Chinese: 回族菜; pinyin: Huízú cài)
- Anhui cuisine (Chinese: 徽菜; pinyin: Huī cài)
