= Anhui cuisine =

Culinary traditions of Anhui province, China

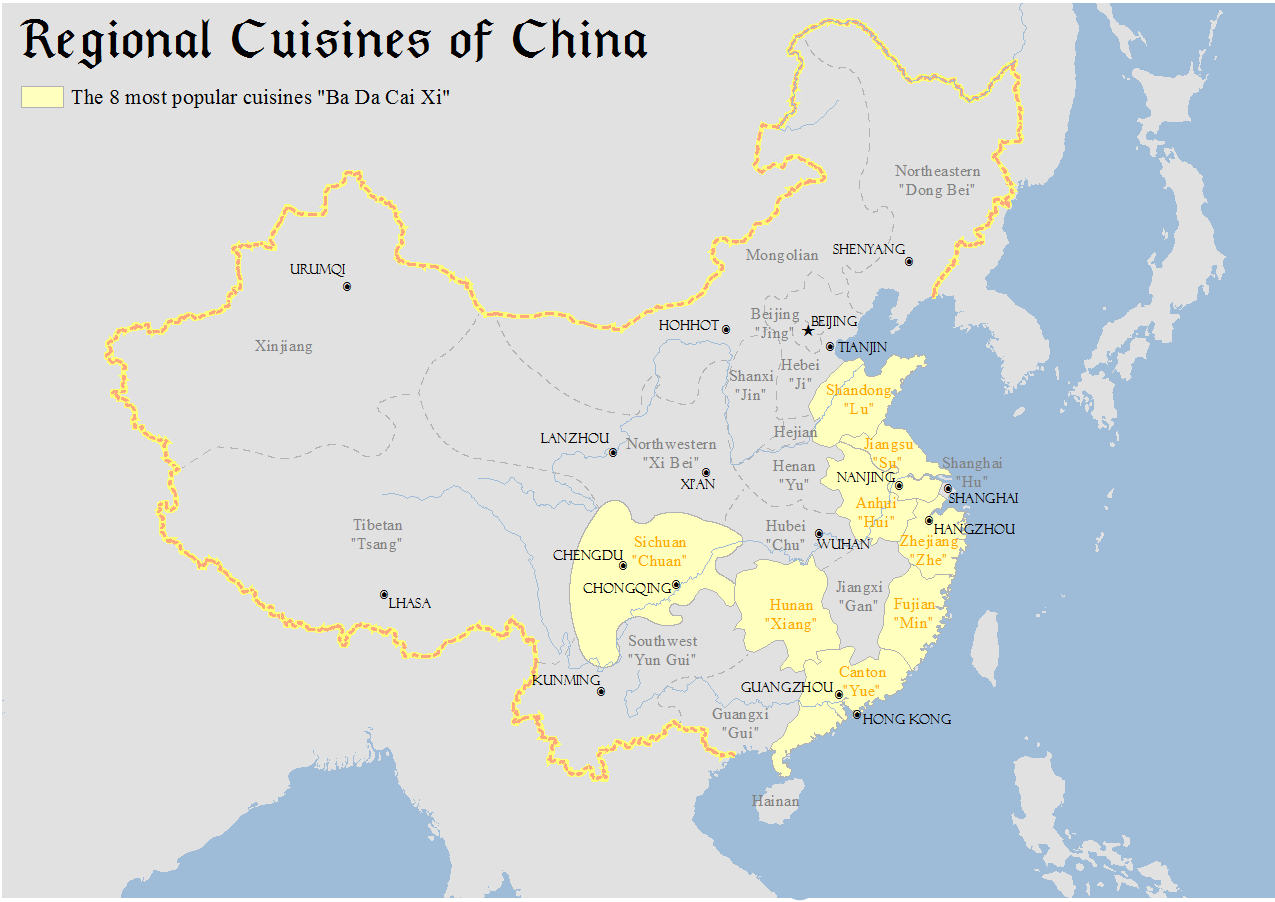
- Regions of China's "Eight Cuisines"
- Chinese: 安徽菜
Transcriptions
Standard Mandarin
- Hanyu Pinyin: Ānhuī cài

Hui cuisine
- Chinese: 徽菜
Transcriptions
Standard Mandarin
- Hanyu Pinyin: Huī cài

Anhui cuisine, alternatively referred to as Hui cuisine, is one of the Eight Culinary Traditions of Chinese cuisine. It is derived from the native cooking styles of the Huangshan region in southern Anhui Province.

== Methods and ingredients ==
Anhui cuisine is known for its use of wild herbs, from both the land and the sea, and simple methods of preparation. Braising and stewing are common; frying and stir frying are used much less frequently than in other Chinese culinary traditions.

Anhui cuisine consists of three styles: the Yangtze River region, Huai River region, and southern Anhui region. Anhui contains many uncultivated fields and forests, meaning wild herbs are common. Anhui cuisine is heavily associated with tofu, with Chinese folklore crediting the creation of tofu to the Han dynasty prince Liu An who hailed from Shou County (dubbed the "hometown of tofu"). According to Chinese legend, stinky tofu was created by Anhuinese scholar Wang Zhihe who sold his product in Beijing to make a living after failing the imperial examination. Hairy tofu was created in Anhui, where it is a popular snack.

== Notable dishes in Anhui cuisine ==
English	Traditional Chinese	Simplified Chinese	Pinyin	Description
Bagongshan stinky tofu	八公山臭豆腐	八公山臭豆腐	bāgōngshān chòu dòufǔ	Also known as "four seasons tofu", is a traditional local snack in Huainan, Anhui.
Egg dumplings	農家蛋餃	农家蛋饺	nóngjiā dàn jiǎo	These dumplings, usually associated with rural cooking, use thin sheets of egg instead of flour for the wrapping. Egg dumplings traditionally use pork as a filling. In preparation, a ladle is lightly coated with oil and heated, well beaten eggs are spooned into the ladle and cooked until the mixture forms a dumpling wrapper. The pork filling is then spooned into the egg wrapping and the entire dumpling steamed. It is often served with soy sauce.
Li Hongzhang chop suey	李鴻章雜碎	李鸿章杂碎	Lǐ Hóngzhāng zásuì	A complex soup named after Li Hongzhang, a prominent Qing dynasty statesman from Anhui Province. The dish has salty and sweet flavours, and includes many ingredients, most often ones include sea cucumber, fish, squid, bamboo, dry bean curd, chicken, ham and assorted vegetables.
Luzhou roast duck	廬州烤鴨	庐州烤鸭	Lúzhōu kǎoyā	A dish from Hefei which first gained recognition when it was offered as tribute to the imperial court.
Potato cellophane noodles	紅薯粉絲	红薯粉丝	hóngshǔ fěnsī	Sweet potato starch vermicelli.
Sanhe shrimp paste	三河蝦糊	三河虾糊	sānhé xiāhú	A regional dish that originated in Sanhe, Feixi County, but can now be found in Hefei. The dish's main components are rice flour and a regional species of small white shrimp. The shrimp are stir fried with leeks and soy sauce, while the rice flour is soaked in water and later added to the shrimp. The dish is brown in colour and has a salty taste. It is eaten with a spoon.
Steamed stone frog	清蒸石蛙	清蒸石蛙	Qīngzhēng shí wā	
Wushan imperial goose	吳山貢鵝	吴山贡鹅	wúshān gòng'é	The dish is lightly coloured and has a fragrant and salty taste.
Stinky mandarin fish	臭鱖魚	臭鳜鱼	Chòu guì yú	The dish smells stinky but has a tender texture and is regarded by some consumers are delicious. The stinky mandarin fish has a complete shape and a bright red color. It emits a pickled flavor, and the meat is delicate and light.

== See also ==
- List of Chinese dishes
