= Tze char =

Singlish term for economic food stalls

- Hàn-jī: 煮炒
- Pe̍h-ōe-jī: Chír-chhá
- Literal meaning: Cook and fry
- Tâi-lô: Tsír-tshá

Tze char, (Note: Chinese: 煮炒; pinyin: zhǔchǎo; Pe̍h-ōe-jī: chír-chhá; lit. 'cook and fry') also romanised Zi char, is a term deriving from Hokkien to describe an economical food stall which provides a wide selection of common and affordable dishes which approximate home-cooked meals.

Most tze char stalls are commonly found throughout the country's hawker centres and kopitiams located in the heartlands of Singapore, (Note: The "Singaporean heartlands" is a local term that largely refers to districts that are not located within the Central Region of the country. However, tze char stalls are still commonplace in the metropolitan area, albeit at higher prices.) selling dishes of Singaporean cuisine. Hence, most of them are usually found in a casual, non air-conditioned setting. Nonetheless, a handful of tze char stalls do have their own air-conditioned dining area as well, and in those without them, ceiling fans are often present as a government policy.

== Meaning and use ==
Tze char stalls are typically characterized by lower prices and large serving portions, making them common choices for gatherings among families and friends in Singapore. In addition to pricing, the home-cooked style of the dishes contributes to their selection by locals. These stalls also provide convenient options for workers seeking meals during lunch breaks or dinner.

Tze char stalls tend to have a wide selection of food available, but are mainly focused on the local cuisine of Singapore. It is common to find variations of rice, noodle, vegetables, meat and seafood being offered. Through the years, there has also been an increase in the number of tze char chefs coming up with their own creative spin on specialty dishes.

== See also ==
- Yam ring, a Singaporean dish that originated from a tze char restaurant

== Notes and references ==
=== Works cited ===
- Lai, Ah Eng (January 2010), The Kopitiam in Singapore: An Evolving Story about Migration and Cultural Diversity, Asia Research Institute Working Paper Series
- Friends, Goz Lee and (January 2014). Plusixfive: A Singaporean Supper Club Cookbook. Epigram Books. ISBN 9789810759070.
