= Hooi Kok Wai =

Singaporean chef and restaurateur

Hooi Kok Wai (simplified Chinese: 许国威; traditional Chinese: 許國威; pinyin: Xǔ Guówēi; born c. 1939), also known as Hooi Kok Wah, is a Singaporean chef and restaurateur. Known as one of the country's four "heavenly kings" of cooking, he began his cooking career in the 1950s.

== Career ==
Hooi started working as a cook at the Cathay Restaurant in the 1950s. On 8 April 1963, Hooi opened his own restaurant, the Dragon Phoenix Restaurant in Tanjong Pagar. In 1974, the Red Star Restaurant, a joint venture between Hooi and his former colleagues at the Cathay Restaurant, was opened.

Hooi is credited with creating a distinct version of chilli crab that involves eggs, sambal, and tomato paste. Hooi and his Red Star Restaurant co-founders are also credited with popularising a Chinese New Year raw fish salad known as yusheng and inventing the yam ring.

As of 2018, Hooi was still involved in running the Red Star Restaurant, while he had handed over management of the Dragon Phoenix Restaurant to his son.
