= Mao tofu =

Chinese fermented tofu

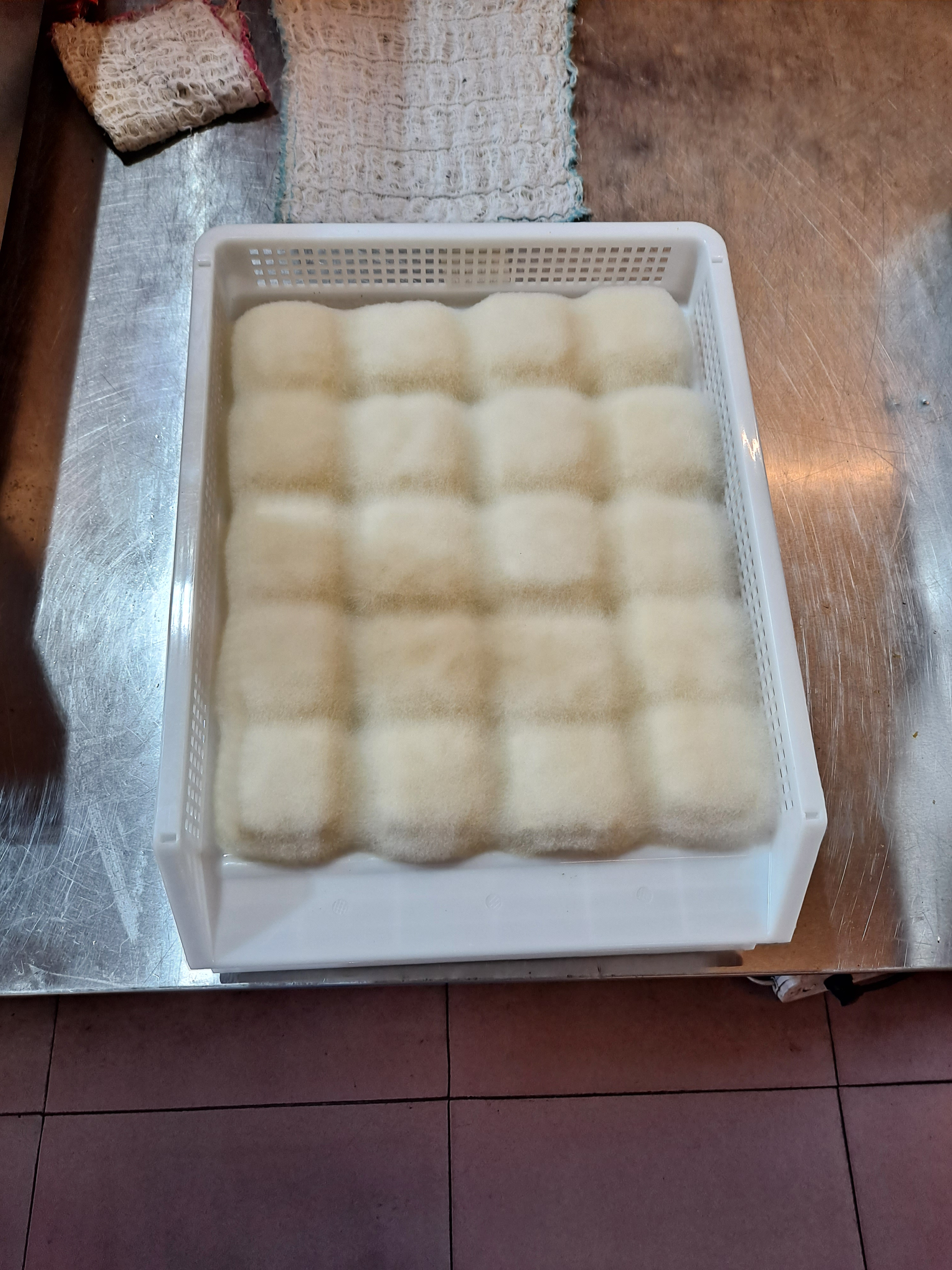
- Alternative names: Hairy tofu
- Place of origin: China
- Main ingredients: fermented tofu

Mao tofu (Chinese: 毛豆腐; pinyin: máo dòufu) or hairy tofu is a Chinese form of fermented tofu. The dish has been consumed in China for hundreds of years.

== Production ==
The tofu is inoculated with Mucor micheli and fermented until fungal mycelium grows on the surface of the tofu creating a hairy appearance, which gives the tofu its name. Mao tofu also contains a large diversity of fungal and bacterial communities.
