= Milk candy =

Milk candy may refer to:

- Dulce de leche, caramelized milk or milk jam
- Milk candy (Asia), a soft candy common to Japan, China and Korea, such as White Rabbit
