= Yam ring =

Singaporean dish

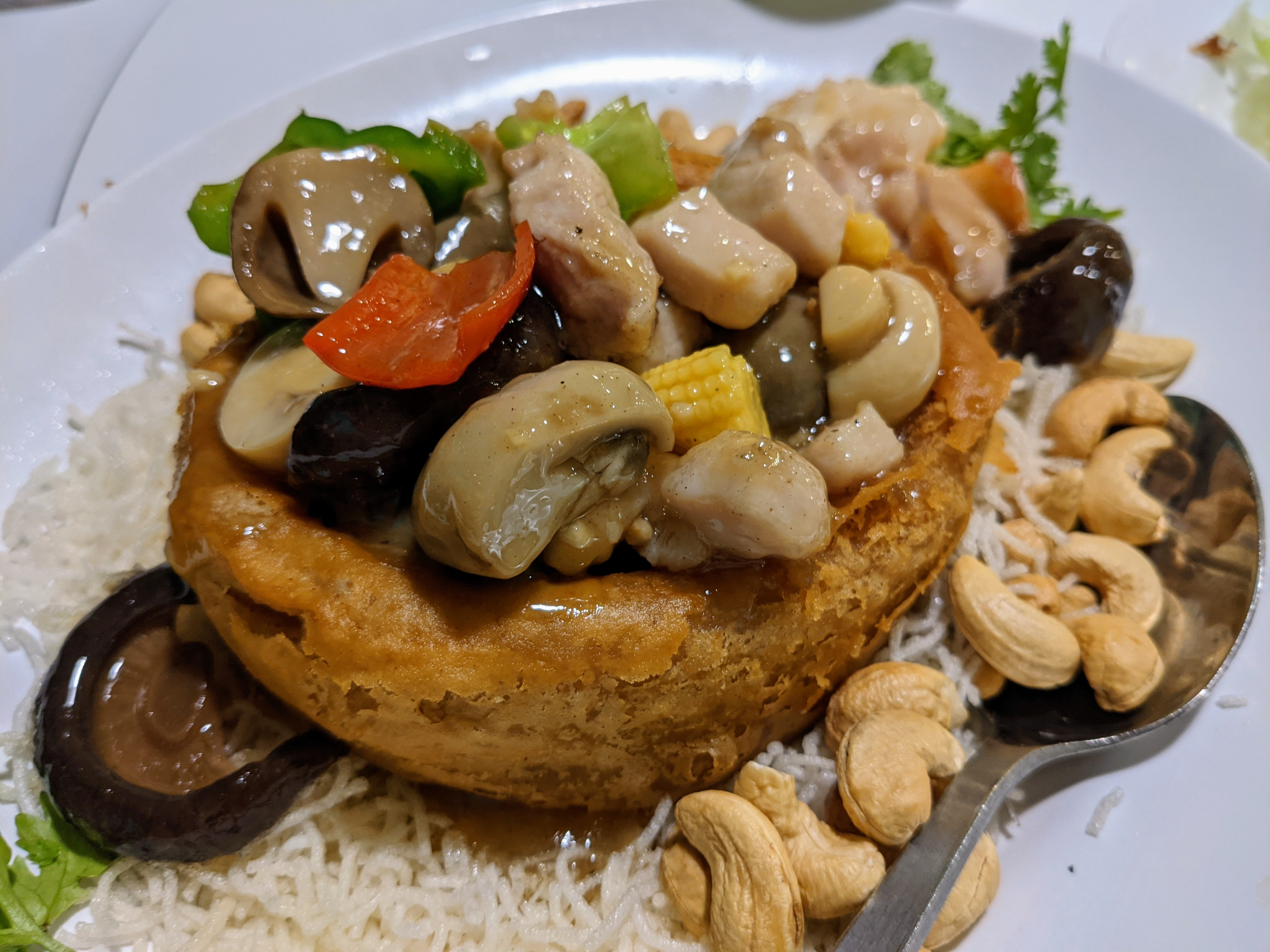
- Yam ring filled with vegetables, mushrooms, chicken and prawns, served on a bed of cashews and dried bee hoon noodles
- Alternative names: Yam basket, Taro basket or Prosperity basket
- Place of origin: Singapore
- Region or state: East and Southeast Asia
- Associated cuisine: Singapore
- Created by: Hooi Kok Wai

Yam ring (Chinese: 芋头圈; pinyin: yùtou quān), also known as yam basket, taro basket or prosperity basket (Chinese: 佛钵; pinyin: fúbō; Jyutping: fat6but3), is a Singaporean dish consisting of a deep-fried ring of mashed taro filled with separately stir-fried ingredients. Originally a vegetarian dish, it is now commonly served with chicken or seafood, and is a staple at tze char restaurants.

== History ==
The dish is commonly credited to Hooi Kok Wai, the founder of the Dragon Phoenix Restaurant in Singapore and one of the "Four Heavenly Kings of Cantonese Cuisine" in the 1960s, chefs who cooked Cantonese–style dishes with local Singaporean ingredients in Singapore.

According to the legend, Chef Hooi invented the dish in 1958 to impress the vegetarian nuns who had brought up his orphaned wife-to-be, Leong Ah Lin. The shape of the dish also resembles the alms bowl used by Buddhist monks, leading to its Chinese name, which literally translates as "fragrant Buddha bowl".

Lai Wah Restaurant, set up by two other Heavenly Kings, also claims credit for inventing the dish.

== See also ==
- Taro dumpling
- Singaporean cuisine
