= History of Chinese cuisine =

The history of Chinese cuisine is marked by both variety and change. The archaeologist and scholar Kwang-chih Chang says "Chinese people are especially preoccupied with food" and "food is at the center of, or at least it accompanies or symbolizes, many social interactions". Over the course of history, he says, "continuity vastly outweighs change." He explains basic organizing principles which go back to earliest times and give a continuity to the food tradition, principally that a normal meal is made up of a plant based products consisting of grains, starch (traditional Chinese: 飯; simplified Chinese: 饭; pinyin: fàn) vegetables (菜; cài) and/or fish (鱼; yú) based dishes with very little red meat (红肉; hóngròu) consumption.

== Overview ==
The Sinologist Endymion Wilkinson has highlighted a succession of incremental and successive changes that fundamentally altered the "richness of ever-changing Chinese cuisine":

1. The expansion of Han culture from the upland stretches of the Yellow River across a huge and expanding geographical area with climate zones ranging from the tropical to the subarctic, each providing new ingredients and indigenous cooking traditions;
2. An elaborate but continually developing traditional medicine which saw food as the basis of good health ("Food was medicine and medicine, food");
3. Constantly shifting demands from elites – beginning with the imperial courts and provincial governors but eventually expanding to include rich landowners, "scholar-gourmands", and itinerant merchants – for specialised cuisines, however far away from home; and
4. Continuous absorption of diverse foreign influences, including the ingredients, cooking methods, and recipes from invading steppe nomads, European missionaries, and Japanese traders.

The philosopher and writer Lin Yutang was more relaxed:

How a Chinese life glows over a good feast! How apt is he to cry out that life is beautiful when his stomach and his intestines are well filled! From this well-filled stomach suffuses and radiates a happiness that is spiritual. The Chinese relies upon instinct and his instinct tells him that when the stomach is right, everything is right. That is why I claim for the Chinese a life closer to instinct and a philosophy that makes a more open acknowledgment of it possible.

Chinese cuisine as we now know evolved gradually over the centuries as new food sources and techniques were introduced, discovered, or invented. Although many of the characteristics we think of as the most important appeared very early, others did not appear or did not become important until relatively late. The first chopsticks, for instance, were probably used for cooking, stirring the fire, and serving bits of food and were not initially used as eating utensils. They began to take on this role during the Han dynasty, but it was not until the Ming that they became ubiquitous for both serving and eating. It was not until the Ming that they acquired their present name (筷子, kuaizi) and their present shape. The wok may also have been introduced during the Han, but again its initial use was limited (to drying grains) and its present use (to stir-fry, as well as boiling, steaming, roasting, and deep-frying) did not develop until the Ming. The Ming also saw the adoption of new plants from the New World, such as maize, peanuts, and tobacco. Wilkinson remarks that to "somebody brought up on late twentieth century Chinese cuisine, Ming food would probably still seem familiar, but anything further back, especially pre-Tang would probably be difficult to recognize as 'Chinese'".

The "Silk Road" is the conventional term for the routes through Central Asia linking the Iranian plateau with western China; along this trade route passed exotic foodstuffs that greatly enlarged the potential for Chinese cuisines, only some of which preserve their foreign origin in the radical for "foreign" that remains in their name. "It would surprise many Chinese cooks to know that some of their basic ingredients were originally foreign imports," Frances Wood observes. "Sesame, peas, onions, coriander from Bactria, and cucumber were all introduced into China from the West during the Han dynasty".

== Classifications ==
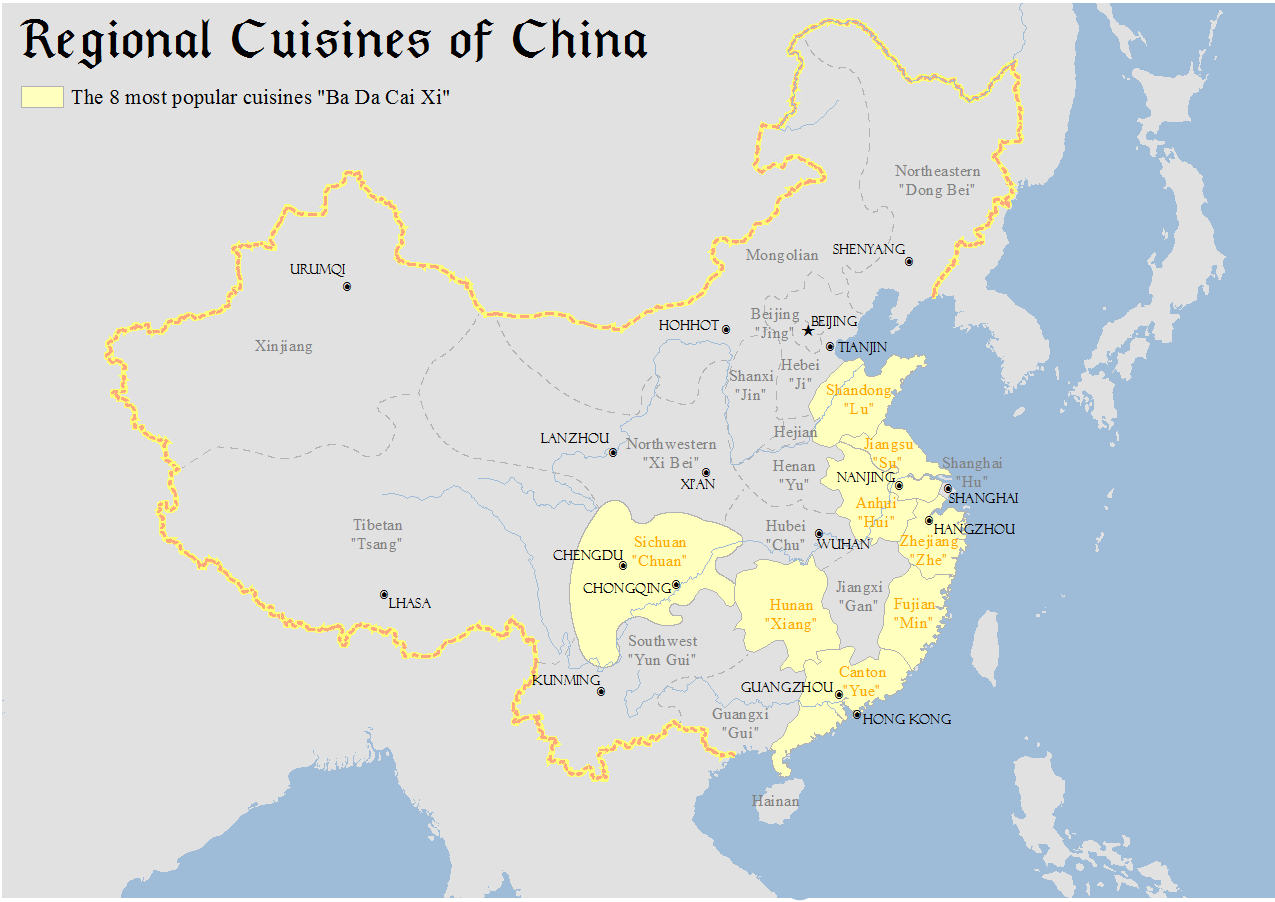
Map showing classification and distribution of major regional cuisines of China

Not long after the expansion of the Chinese Empire during the Qin dynasty, Han writers noted the great differences in culinary practices among the different parts of their realm. These differences followed to a great extent the varying climates and availabilities of foodstuffs in China. Many writers tried their hands at classification, but since internal political boundaries over the centuries did not coincide with shifting cultural identities, there was no way to establish clear-cut or enduring classifications or ranking of foods and cooking styles. Different ethnic groups might occupy only small areas, but their cuisines were included in systematic lists from early on. Certain broad categorizations are useful, however:

=== Northern and southern cuisine ===
The primary and earliest distinction was between the earlier settled and relatively arid North China Plain and the rainier hill country south of the Yangtze River which were incorporated into the Chinese empire much later. First canals and now railroads and highways have blurred the distinction, but it remains true that rice predominates in southern cuisine and flour products (principally various noodles and dumplings) in the north.

=== Four Schools ===
The "Four Schools" refers to Shandong's (called after its former polity of Lu), Jiangsu's (called Yang after its most famous branch), Cantonese (called after its former polity of Yue), and Sichuan's (abbreviated to Chuan) cuisines.

The cooking styles of other areas was then arranged as branches of these four:

Lu (Shandong)	Yang (Su)	Yue (Guangdong/Cantonese)	Chuan (Sichuan)
Beijing cuisine; Imperial; Aristocrat; Tianjin (Jin); Northeastern; Liao; Shanxi (Jin)	Huaiyang; Anhui (Hui); Shanghai (Hu); Zhejiang (Zhe); Henan (Yu); Hubei (E)	Chiuchow (Chaozhou); Hakka (Kejia); Fujian (Min); Hainan (Qiong); Hong Kong; Macanese	Guizhou (Qian); Hunan (Xiang); Jiangxi (Gan); Shaanxi (Qin); Yunnan (Dian)

=== Eight Schools ===
Eventually, four of these branches were recognized as distinct Chinese schools themselves: Hunan's cuisine (called Xiang for its local river), Fujian's (called Min for its native people), Anhui's (abbreviated as Hui), and Zhejiang's (abbreviated as Zhe).

== History ==
=== Neolithic ===
Although no reliable written sources document this era of Chinese history, archaeologists are sometimes able to make deductions about food preparation and storage based on site excavations. Sometimes artifacts and (very rarely) actual preserved foodstuffs are discovered. In October 2005, the oldest noodles yet discovered were located at the Lajia site near the upper reaches of the Yellow River in Qinghai. The site has been associated with the Qijia culture. Over 4,000 years old, the noodles were made from foxtail and broomcorn millet.

=== Early dynastic times ===
Legendary accounts of the introduction of agriculture by Shennong credit him for first cultivating the "Five Grains", although the lists vary and very often include seeds like hemp and sesame principally used for oils and flavoring. The list in the Classic of Rites comprises soybeans, wheat, broomcorn and foxtail millet, and hemp. The Ming encyclopedist Song Yingxing properly noted that rice was not counted among the Five Grains cultivated by Shennong because southern China had not yet been settled or cultivated by the Han, but many accounts of the Five Grains do place rice on their lists.

==== Han dynasty ====
The most common staple crops consumed during the Han dynasty were wheat, barley, rice, foxtail and broomcorn millet, and beans. Commonly eaten fruits and vegetables included chestnuts, pears, plums, peaches, melons, apricots, red bayberries, jujubes, calabash, bamboo shoots, mustard greens, and taro. Domesticated animals that were also eaten included chickens, Mandarin ducks, pigs, geese, sheep, camels, and dogs. Turtles and fish were taken from streams and lakes. The owl, pheasant, magpie, sika deer, and Chinese bamboo partridge were commonly hunted and consumed. Seasonings included sugar, honey, salt and soy sauce. Beer and yellow wine were regularly consumed, although baijiu was not available until much later.

During the Han dynasty, Chinese developed methods of food preservation for military rations during campaigns such as drying meat into jerky and cooking, roasting, and drying grain.

Chinese legends claim that the roasted, flat shaobing bread was brought back from the Xiyu (the Western Regions, a name for Central Asia) by the Han dynasty General Ban Chao, and that it was originally known as barbarian pastry (simplified Chinese: 胡饼; traditional Chinese: 胡餅; pinyin: húbǐng). The shaobing is believed to be descended from the hubing. Shaobing is believed to be related to the Persian and Central Asian naan and the Near Eastern pita. Central Asians made and sold sesame cakes in China during the Tang dynasty.

By the time of the Han dynasty, the different regions (which were not completely unified previously just after the end of Qin dynasty) and cuisines of China's people were linked by major canals and leading to greater complexity in the different regional cuisines. Not only is food seen as giving "qi", energy, but the food is also about maintaining yin and yang. ... food was judged for color, aroma, taste, and texture and a good meal was expected to balance the Four Natures ('hot', warm, cool, and 'cold') and the Five Tastes (pungent, sweet, sour, bitter, and salty). Salt was used as a preservative from early times, but in cooking was added in the form of soy sauce, and not at the table.

=== Southern and Northern dynasties ===
During the Northern and Southern dynasties non-Han people like the Xianbei of Northern Wei introduced their cuisine to northern China, and these influences continued up to the Tang dynasty, popularizing meat like mutton and dairy products like goat milk, yogurts, and kumis among even Han people. It was during the Song dynasty that Han Chinese developed an aversion to dairy products and abandoned the dairy foods introduced earlier. The Han Chinese rebel Wang Su, who received asylum in the Xianbei Northern Wei after fleeing from Southern Qi, at first could not stand eating dairy products like goat's milk and meat like mutton and had to consume tea and fish instead, but after a few years he was able to eat yogurt and lamb, and the Xianbei Emperor asked him which of the foods of China (Zhongguo) he preferred, fish versus mutton and tea versus yogurt. 280 recipes are found in the Jia Sixie's text the Qimin Yaoshu.

=== Tang dynasty ===
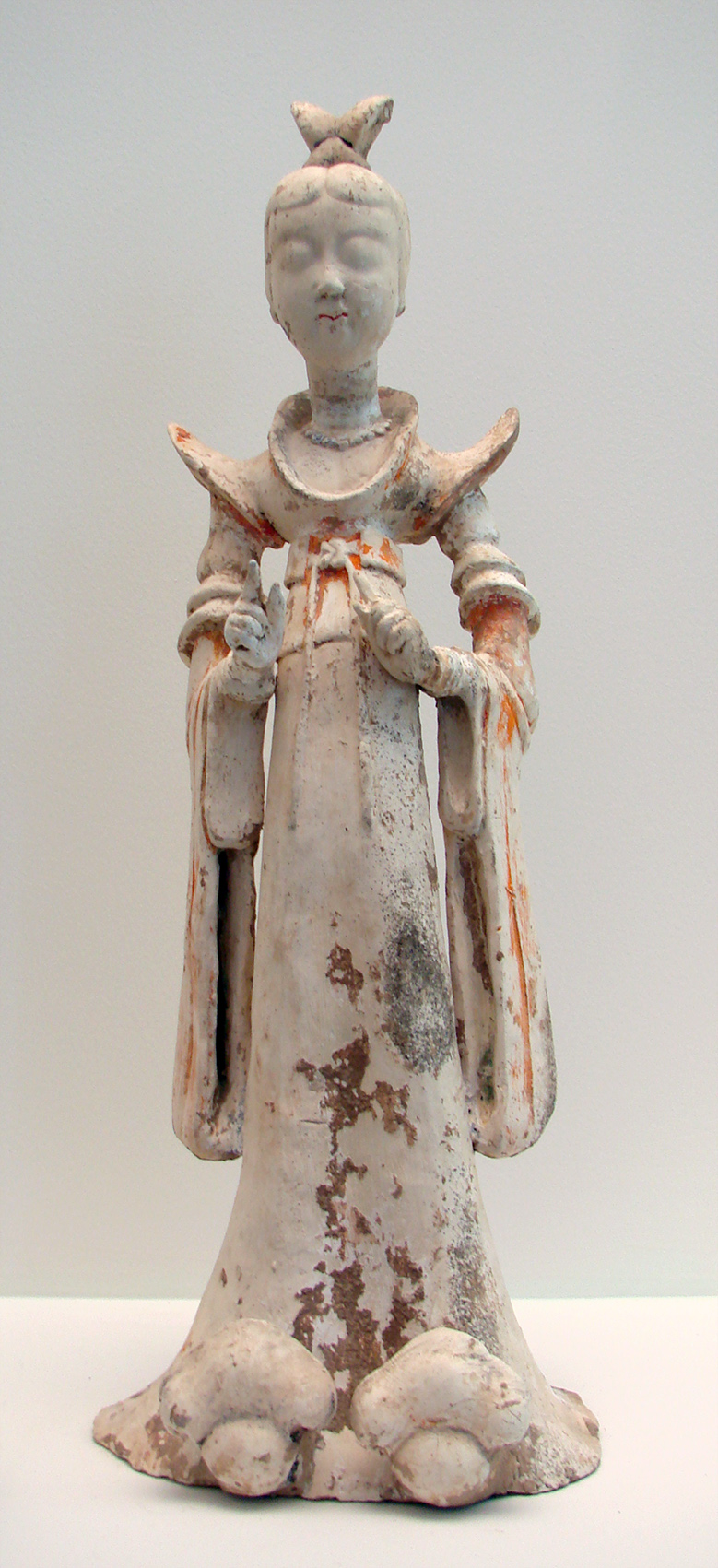
A terracotta sculpture of a woman, 7th–8th century; during the Tang era, female hosts prepared feasts, tea parties, and played drinking games with their guests.

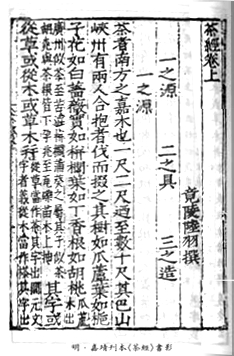
A page of Lu Yu's Classic of Tea

The fascination with exotics from the diverse range of the Tang empire and the search for plants and animals which promoted health and longevity were two of the factors encouraging diversity in Tang dynasty diet. During the Tang, the many common foodstuffs and cooking ingredients in addition to those already listed were barley, garlic, salt, turnips, soybeans, pears, apricots, peaches, apples, pomegranates, jujubes, rhubarb, hazelnuts, pine nuts, chestnuts, walnuts, yams, taro, etc. The various meats that were consumed included pork, chicken, lamb (especially preferred in the north), sea otter, bear (which was hard to catch, but there were recipes for steamed, boiled, and marinated bear), and even Bactrian camels. In the south along the coast meat from seafood was by default the most common, as the Chinese enjoyed eating cooked jellyfish with cinnamon, Sichuan pepper, cardamom, and ginger, as well as oysters with wine, fried squid with ginger and vinegar, horseshoe crabs and red crabs, shrimp, and pufferfish, which the Chinese called 'river piglet'.

Some foods were also off-limits, as the Tang court encouraged people not to eat beef (since the bull was a valuable draft animal), and from 831 to 833 Emperor Wenzong of Tang banned the slaughter of cattle on the grounds of his religious convictions to Buddhism. From the trade overseas and over land, the Chinese acquired golden peaches from Samarkand, date palms, pistachios, and figs from Persia, pine seeds and ginseng roots from Korea, and mangoes from Southeast Asia. In China, there was a great demand for sugar; during the reign of Harsha (r. 606–647) over North India, Indian envoys to Tang China brought two makers of sugar who successfully taught the Chinese how to cultivate sugarcane. Cotton also came from India as a finished product from Bengal, although it was during the Tang that the Chinese began to grow and process cotton, and by the Yuan dynasty it became the prime textile fabric in China.

During the earlier Northern and Southern dynasties (420–589), and perhaps even earlier, the drinking of tea became popular in southern China. (Tea comes from the leaf buds of Camellia sinensis, native to southwestern China.) Tea was viewed then as a beverage of tasteful pleasure and with pharmacological purpose as well. During the Tang dynasty, tea became synonymous with everything sophisticated in society. The Tang poet Lu Tong (790–835) devoted most of his poetry to his love of tea. The 8th-century author Lu Yu (known as the Sage of Tea) even wrote a treatise on the art of drinking tea, called the Classic of Tea (Chájīng). Tea was also enjoyed by Uyghur Turks; when riding into town, the first places they visited were the tea shops. Although wrapping paper had been used in China since the 2nd century BC, during the Tang dynasty the Chinese were using wrapping paper as folded and sewn square bags to hold and preserve the flavor of tea leaves.

Methods of food preservation continued to develop. The common people used simple methods of preservation, such as digging deep ditches and trenches, brining, and salting their foods. The emperor had large ice pits located in the parks in and around Chang'an for preserving food, while the wealthy and elite had their own smaller ice pits. Each year the emperor had laborers carve 1000 blocks of ice from frozen creeks in mountain valleys, each block with the dimension of 0.91 by 0.91 by 1.06 m (3.0 by 3.0 by 3.5 ft). There were many frozen delicacies enjoyed during the summer, especially chilled melon.

=== Liao, Song and Jurchen Jin dynasties ===
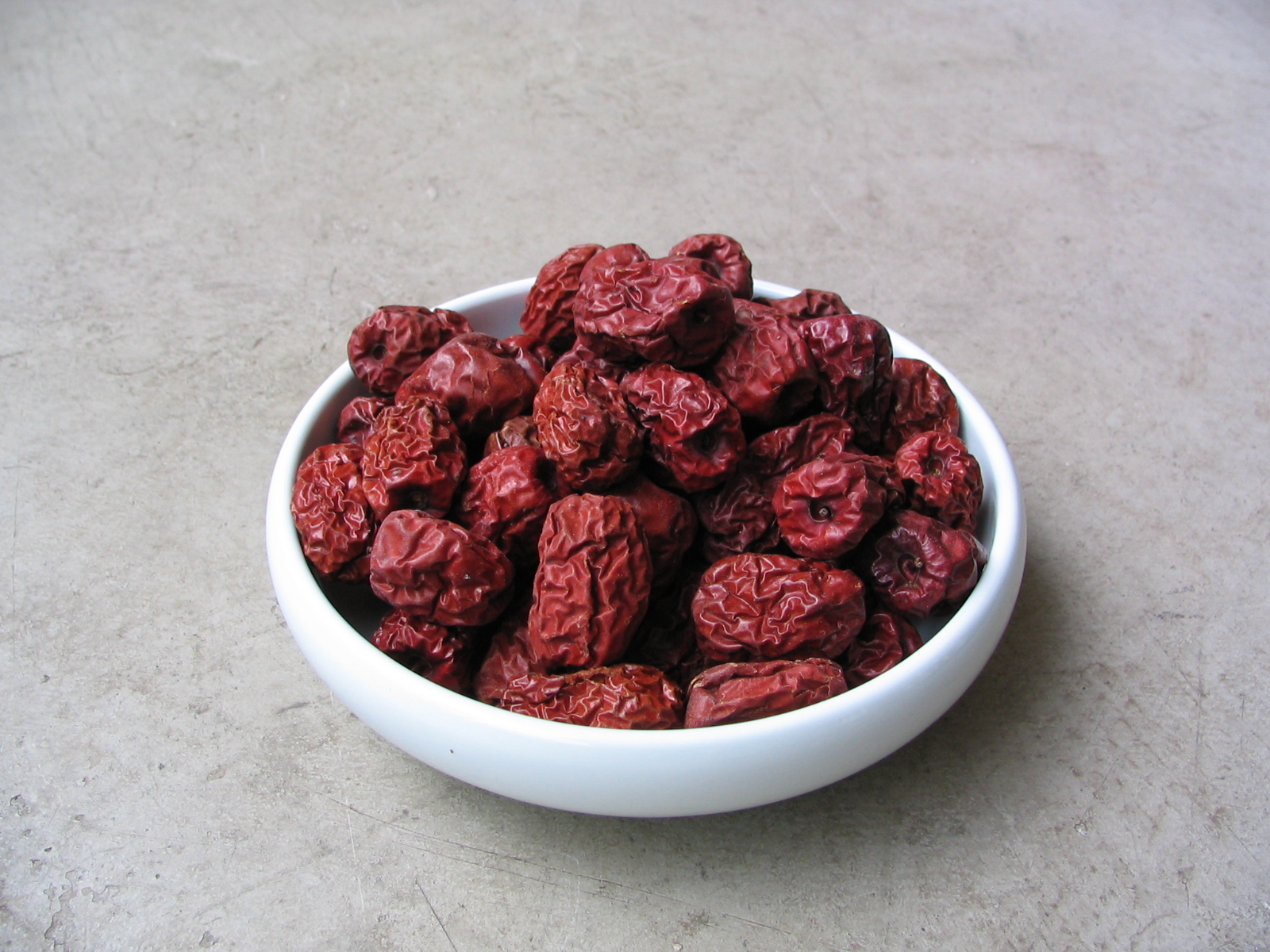
Dried jujubes such as these were imported to from South Asia and the Middle East. An official from Canton was invited to the home of an Arab merchant, and described the jujube: "This fruit is the color of sugar, its skin and its pulp are sweet, and it gives the impression, when you eat it, of having first been cooked in the oven and then allowed to dry."

The Song saw a turning point. Twin revolutions in commerce and agriculture created an enlarged group of leisured and cultivated city dwellers with access to a great range of techniques and materials for whom eating became a self-conscious and rational experience. The food historian Michael Freeman argues that the Song developed a "cuisine" which was "derived from no single tradition but, rather, amalgamates, selects, and organizes the best of several traditions." "Cuisine" in this sense does not develop out of the cooking traditions of a single region, but "requires a sizable corps of critical adventuresome eaters, not bound by the tastes of their native region and willing to try unfamiliar food". Finally, "cuisine" is the product of attitudes which "give first place to the real pleasure of consuming food rather than to its purely ritualistic significance." This was neither the ritual or political cuisine of the court, nor the cooking of the countryside, but rather what we now think of as "Chinese food". In the Song, we find well-documented evidence for restaurants, that is, places where customers chose from menus, as opposed to taverns or hostels, where they had no choice. These restaurants featured regional cuisines. Gourmets wrote of their preferences, showing that food and eating had become a conscious aesthetic experience. These Song phenomena were not found until much later in Europe.

There are lists of entrées and food dishes in customer menus for restaurants and taverns, as well as for feasts at banquets, festivals and carnivals, and modest dining, most copiously in the memoir Dongjing Meng Hua Lu (Dreams of Splendor of the Eastern Capital). Many of the peculiar names for these dishes do not provide clues as to what types of food ingredients were used. However, the scholar Jacques Gernet, judging from the seasonings used, such as pepper, ginger, soya sauce, oil, salt, and vinegar, suggests that the cuisine of Hangzhou was not too different from the Chinese cuisine of today. Other additional seasonings and ingredients included walnuts, turnips, crushed Chinese cardamon kernels, fagara, olives, ginkgo nuts, citrus zest, and sesame oil.

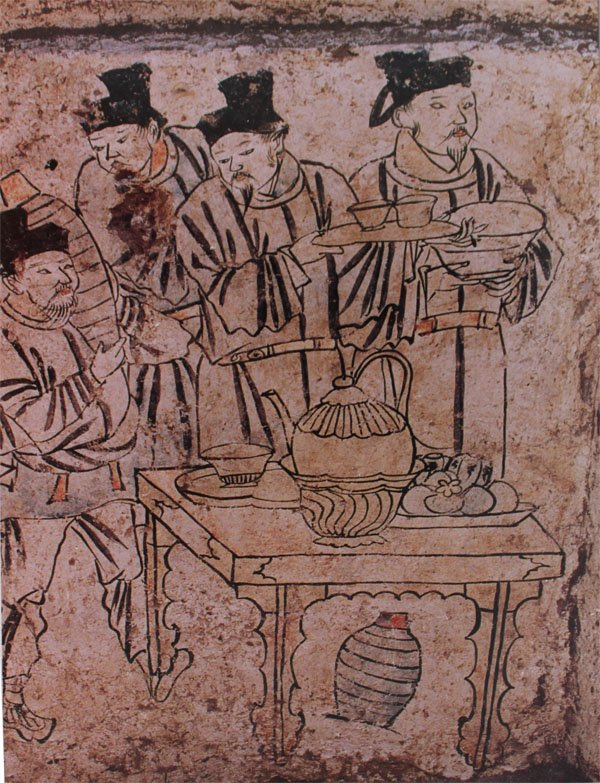
A mural of people preparing drinks of Liao dynasty.

Regional differences in ecology and culture produced different styles of cooking. In the turmoil of the Southern Song, refugees brought cooking traditions of regional cultures to the capital at Hangzhou. After the mass exodus from the north, people brought Henan-style cooking and foods (popular in the previous Northern Song capital at Kaifeng) to Hangzhou, which was blended with the cooking traditions of Zhejiang.

However, already in the Northern Song capital at Kaifeng there were restaurants that served southern Chinese cuisine. They catered to capital officials whose native provinces were in the southeast, and would have found northern cuisine too bland for their tastes. Song era documents provide the first use of the phrases nanshi, beishi, and chuanfan to refer specifically to southern (南食), northern (北食), and Sichuan (川饭) food, respectively. Restaurants were known for their specialties; for example, a restaurant in Hangzhou served only iced foods, while some restaurants catered to those who wanted either hot, warm, room temperature, or cold foods. Descendants of Kaifeng restaurant owners ran most of the restaurants in Hangzhou, but many other regional varieties were also represented. This included restaurants featuring highly spiced Sichuan cuisine; there were taverns featuring dishes and beverages from Hebei and Shandong, as well as those with coastal foods of shrimp and saltwater fish. The memory and patience of waiters had to be keen; in the larger restaurants, dinner parties with twenty or so dishes became a hassle if the server made even a slight mistake. If a guest complained, the waiter could be scolded, have his salary docked, or in extreme cases, even fired.

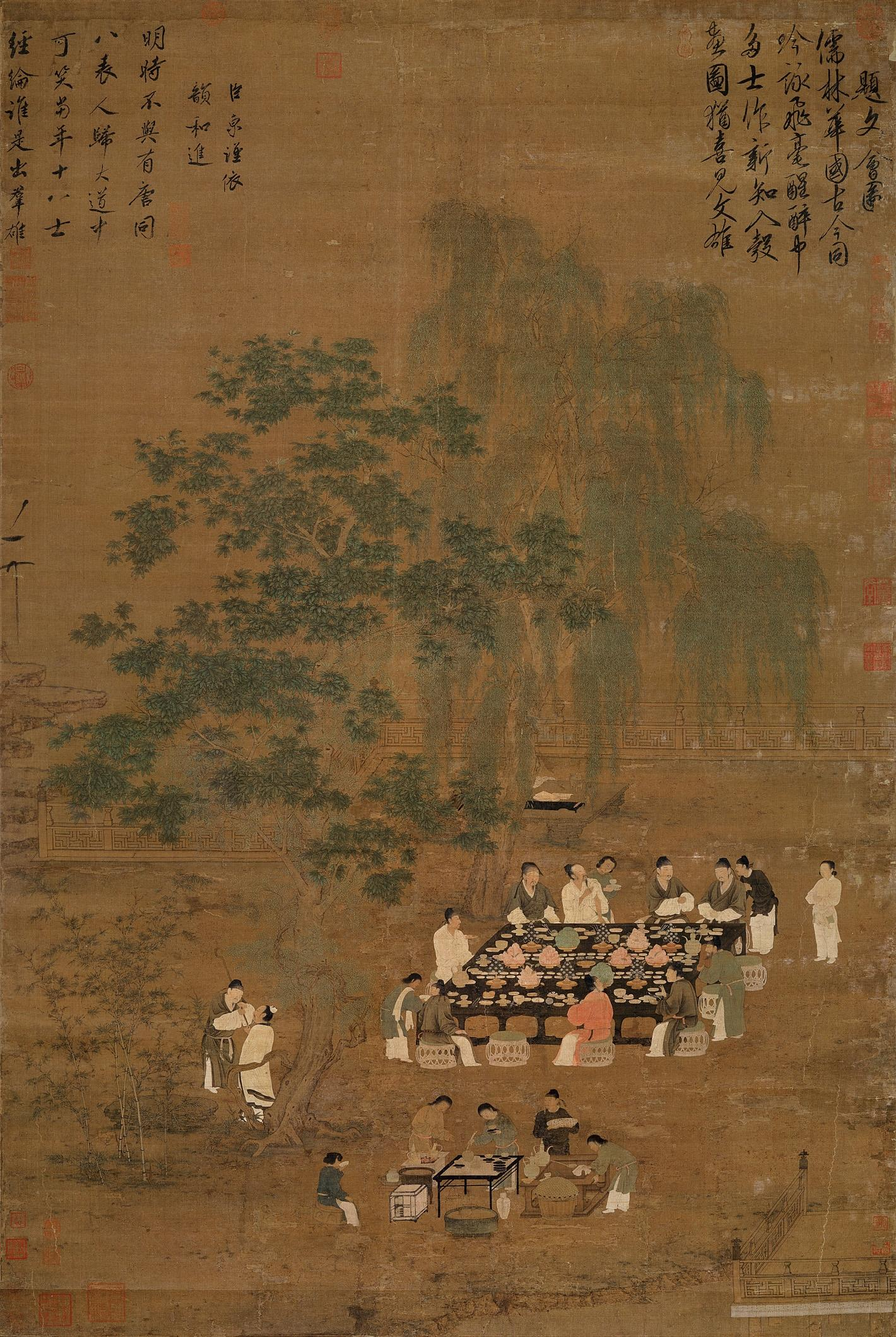
A Chinese painting of an outdoor banquet, a Song dynasty painting and possible remake of a Tang dynasty original.

Along the wide avenue of the Imperial Way in Hangzhou, special breakfast items and delicacies were sold in the morning. They included fried tripe, pieces of mutton or goose, various soups, hot pancakes, steamed pancakes, and iced cakes. Noodle shops were also popular, and remained open all day and night along the Imperial Way. Night markets closed at the third night watch but reopened on the fifth, and also gained a reputation for staying open during winter storms and the darkest, rainiest days of winter.

Foods came to China from abroad, including raisins, dates, Persian jujubes, and grape wine. The Venetian visitor Marco Polo noted that rice wine was more common than grape wine, however. Although grape-based wine had been known in China since Han dynasty Chinese ventured into Hellenistic Central Asia, it was reserved for the elite. Other beverages included pear juice, lychee fruit juice, honey and ginger drinks, tea, and pawpaw juice. Dairy products, common in the Tang dynasty, became associated with foreign cultures, which explains the absence of cheese and milk in their diet. Beef was also rarely eaten, since the bull was an important draft animal. The main diet of the lower classes remained rice, pork, and salted fish. While restaurant dinner menus show they did not eat dog meat, the rich did consume an array of wild and domestic meats, such as chicken, shellfish, fallow deer, hare, partridge, pheasant, francolin, quail, fox, badger, clam, crab, among others. A claim that human meat was served in Hangzhou restaurants during the Song dynasty has been dismissed as unlikely. Freshwater fish from the nearby lake and river were also brought to market, while the West Lake provided geese and duck as well. Common fruits included melons, pomegranates, lychees, longans, golden oranges, jujube, quince, apricots and pears; in the region around Hangzhou alone, there were eleven kinds of apricots and eight kinds of pears.

Special and combination dishes included scented shellfish cooked in rice-wine, geese with apricots, lotus seed soup, spicy soup with mussels and fish cooked with plums, sweet soya soup, baked sesame buns stuffed with either sour bean filling or pork tenderloin, mixed vegetable buns, fragrant candied fruit, strips of ginger and fermented beanpaste, jujube-stuffed steamed dumplings, fried chestnuts, salted fermented bean soup, fruit cooked in scented honey, and 'honey crisps' of kneaded and baked honey, flour, mutton fat and pork lard. Dessert molds of oiled flour and sugared honey were shaped into girls' faces or statuettes of soldiers with full armor like door guards, and were called "likeness foods" (guoshi).

Su Shi a famous poet and statesmen at the time wrote extensively on the food and wine of the period. The legacy of his appreciation of food and gastronomy, as well as his later popularity can be seen in Dongpo pork, a dish named after him. An influential work which recorded the cuisine of this period is Shanjia Qinggong (山家清供; 'The Simple Foods of the Mountain Folk') by Lin Hong (林洪). This recipe book accounts the preparation of numerous dishes of common and fine cuisines. The dietary and culinary habits also changed greatly during this period, with many ingredients such as soy sauce and Central Asian influenced foods becoming widespread and the creation of important cookbooks such as the Shanjia Qinggong and the Wushi Zhongkuilu (Chinese: 吳氏中饋錄; pinyin: wushi zhoungkuilu) showing the respective esoteric foods and common household cuisine of the time.

=== Mongol Yuan dynasty ===
During the Yuan dynasty (1271–1368), contacts with the West also brought the introduction to China of a major food crop, sorghum, along with other foreign food products and methods of preparation. Hu Sihui, a Mongol doctor of Chinese medicine, compiled the Yinshan Zhengyao, a guide to cooking and health which incorporated Chinese and Mongol food practices. The recipes for the medicines are listed in a fashionable way which allows the readers to avoid lingering over the descriptions of the cooking methods. For instance, the description includes the step by step instructions for every ingredients and is followed by the cooking methods for these ingredients. Yunnan cuisine is unique in China for its cheeses like Rubing and Rushan cheese made by the Bai people, and its yogurt, the yogurt may have been due to a combination of Mongolian influence during the Yuan dynasty, the Central Asian settlement in Yunnan, and the proximity and influence of India and Tibet on Yunnan.

=== Ming dynasty ===
China during the Ming dynasty (1368–1644) became involved in a new global trade of goods, plants, animals, and food crops known as the Columbian Exchange. Although the bulk of imports to China were silver, the Chinese also purchased New World crops from the Spanish Empire. This included sweet potatoes, maize, and peanuts, foods that could be cultivated in lands where traditional Chinese staple crops—wheat, millet, and rice—couldn't grow, hence facilitating a rise in the population of China. In the Song dynasty (960–1279), rice had become the major staple crop of the poor; after sweet potatoes were introduced to China around 1560, it gradually became the traditional food of the lower classes. Because of the need for more food, prices went up and more of the lower class citizens died.

=== Qing dynasty ===
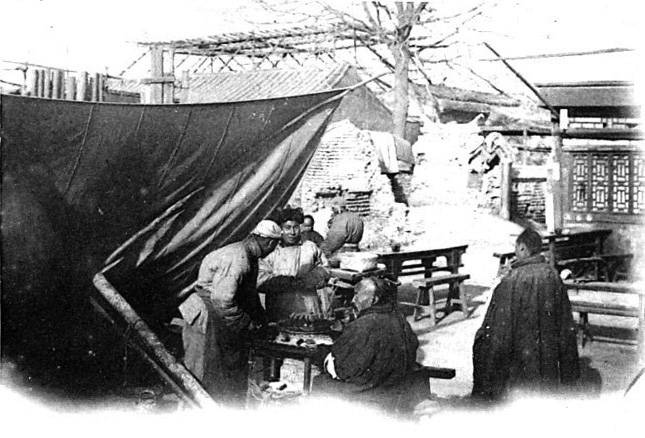
Chinese Street Food in Beijing (1900–1901).

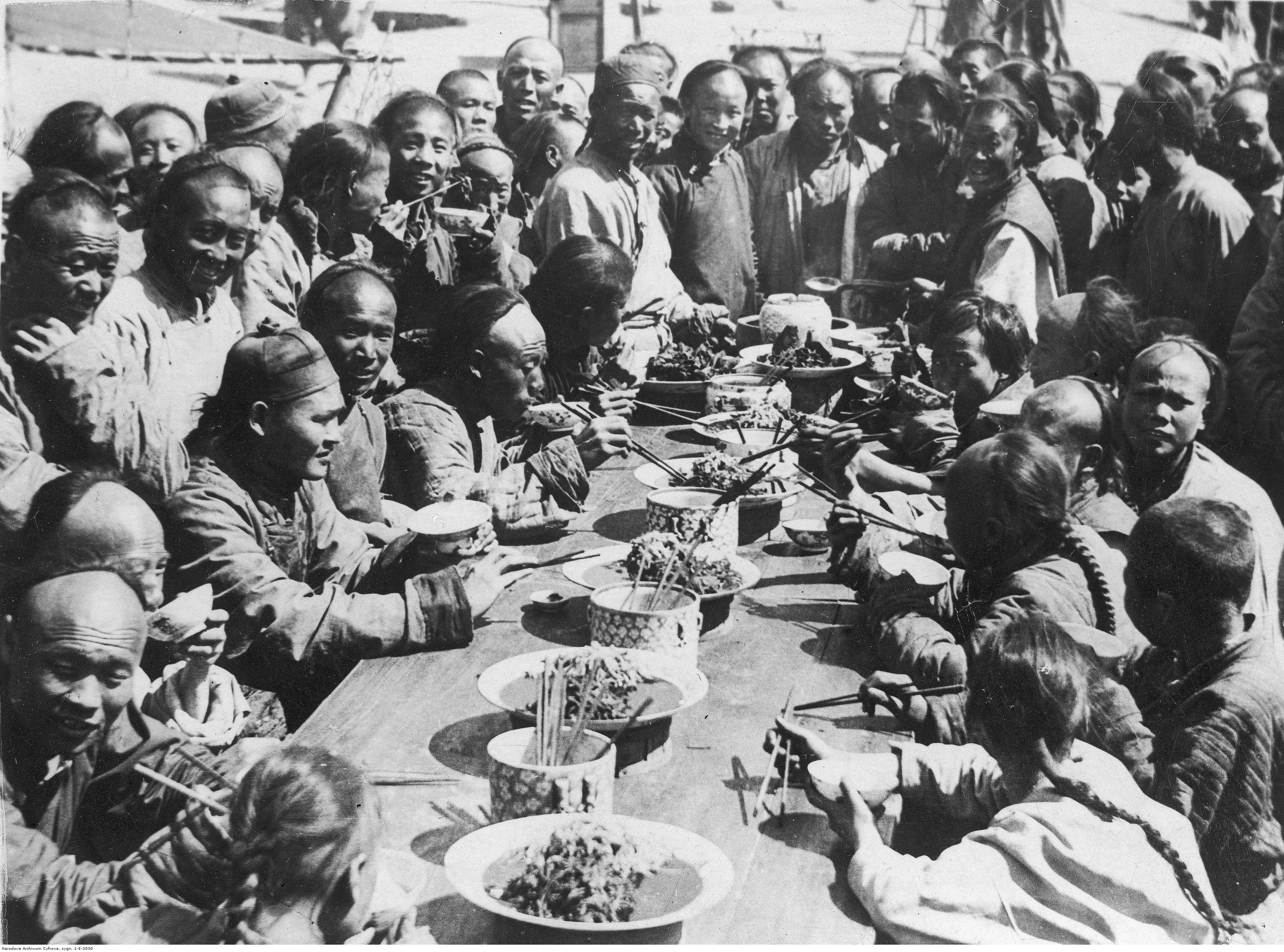
Chinese Street Food in Beijing.

Jonathan Spence writes appreciatively that by the Qing dynasty the "culinary arts were treated as a part of the life of the mind: There was a Tao of food, just as there was Tao of conduct and one of literary creation." The opulence of the scholar-official Li Liweng was balanced by the gastronome Yuan Mei. To make the best rice, Li would send his maid to gather the dew from the flowers of the wild rose, cassia, or citron to add at the last minute; Li insisted that water from garden roses was too strong. Yuan Mei takes the position of the ascetic gourmet, in his gastronomic work the Suiyuan shidan, he wrote:

I always say that chicken, pork, fish and duck are the original geniuses of the board, each with a flavor of its own, each with its distinctive style; whereas sea-slug and swallows-nest (despite their costliness) are commonplace fellows, with no character – in fact, mere hangers-on. I was once asked to a party by a certain Governor, who gave us plain boiled swallows-nest, served in enormous vases, like flower pots. It had no taste at all.... If our host’s object was simply to impress, it would have been better to put a hundred pearls into each bowl. Then we would have known that the meal had cost him tens of thousands, without the unpleasantness of being expected to eat what was uneatable."

After such a meal, Yuan said, he would return home and make himself a bowl of congee.

The records of the Imperial Banqueting Court (光禄寺; 光祿寺; Guānglù Sì; Kuang-lu ssu) published in the late Qing period showed there were several levels of Manchu banquets (满席; 滿席; Mǎn xí) and Chinese banquets (汉席; 漢席; Hàn xí). The royal Manchu Han Imperial Feast is one that combined both traditions.

The specialty dish Dazhu gansi was highly commended by the Qing emperor Qianglong.

=== Post-dynastic China ===
After the end of the Qing dynasty, the cook previously employed by the Imperial Kitchens opened-up restaurants which allowed the people to experience many of the formerly inaccessible foods eaten by the Emperor and his court. However, with the beginning of the Chinese Civil War, many of the cooks and individuals knowledgeable in the cuisines of the period in China left for Hong Kong, Taiwan, and the United States. Among them were the likes of Irene Kuo who was an ambassador to the culinary heritage of China, teaching the Western world of the more refined aspects of Chinese cuisine.

Since the founding of the People's Republic of China, the nation has suffered from a series of major food supply problems under the Chinese Communist Party. Poor, countryside provinces like Henan and Gansu experienced the worst. By January 1959 the food supply for residents in Beijing was reduced to 1 cabbage per household per day. Many peasants suffered from malnutrition, and at the same time increasing the amount they handed over to the state. Beginning in 1960, the Great Chinese Famine contributed to more problems due to bad government policies. During this time there was little to no advancement in the culinary tradition. Many fled to neighbouring Hong Kong and Taiwan to avoid starvation.

Year	Percent of grain handed over to the Communist party
1957	24.8%
1959	39.6%
1960	35.7%

In Beijing in the 1990s, a Communist-style cuisine, which is also called Cultural Revolution cuisine or CR cuisine has also been popular. Other recent innovations include the Retro-Maoist cuisine, which cashed in on the 100th anniversary of Mao Zedong's birthday, whether it was officially endorsed or not. The menu includes items such as cornmeal cakes and rice gruel. In February 1994 the Wall Street Journal wrote an article about Retro-Maoist cuisine being a hit in China. Owners of a CR-style restaurant said, "We're not nostalgic for Mao, per se. We're nostalgic for our youth." The Chinese government has denied any involvement with Retro-Maoist cuisine.

One of the cuisines to benefit during the 1990s was the Chinese Islamic cuisine. The cuisines of other cultures in China have benefited from recent changes in government policy. During the Great Leap Forward and Cultural revolution of the 1970s, the government pressured the Hui people, to adopt Han Chinese culture. The national government has since abandoned efforts to impose a homogeneous Chinese culture. In order to revive their rare cuisine, the Huis began labeling their food as "traditional Hui cuisine". The revival effort has met with some success; for example, in 1994 the "Yan's family eatery" earned 15,000 yuan net income per month. This was well above the national salary average at that time.

Crocodiles were eaten by Vietnamese while they were taboo and off limits for Chinese. Vietnamese women who married Chinese men adopted the Chinese taboo.

== Famous quotes ==
A common saying attempts to summarize the entire cuisine in one sentence, although it now rather outdated (Hunan and Sichuan are now more famous even within China for their spicy food) and numerous variants have sprung up:

Language	Phrase
Traditional Chinese	東甜，南鹹，西酸，北辣
Simplified Chinese	东甜，南咸，西酸，北辣
English	The East is sweet, the South's salty, the West is sour, the North is hot.
Pinyin	Dōng tián, nán xián, xī suān, běi là.
Jyutping	Dung^{1} tim^{4}, naam^{4} haam^{4}, sai^{1} syun^{1}, bak^{1} laat^{6*2}.

Another popular traditional phrase, discussing regional strengths, singles out Cantonese cuisine as a favorite:

Language	Phrase
Traditional Chinese	食在廣州，穿在蘇州，玩在杭州，死在柳州
Simplified Chinese	食在广州，穿在苏州，玩在杭州，死在柳州
English	Eat in Guangzhou, clothe in Suzhou, play in Hangzhou, die in Liuzhou.
Pinyin	Shí zài Guǎngzhōu, chuān zài Sūzhōu, wán zài Hángzhōu, sǐ zài Liǔzhōu.
Cantonese	Sik joi Gwongjau, chuen joi Sojau, waan joi Hongjau, sei joi Laujau.

The other references praise Suzhou's silk industry and tailors; Hangzhou's scenery; and Liuzhou's forests, whose fir trees were valued for coffins in traditional Chinese burials before cremation became popular. Variants usually keep the same focus for Canton and Guilin but sometimes suggest 'playing' in Suzhou instead (it is famed within China both for its traditional gardens and beautiful women) and 'living' (住) in Hangzhou.

== See also ==
- A Bite of China – a seven-part CCTV television series
- Flexitarianism
