= Chinese aristocrat cuisine =

Chinese aristocrat cuisine (Chinese: 官府菜; pinyin: guānfǔ cài) traces its origin to the Ming and Qing dynasties when imperial officials stationed in Beijing brought their private chefs and such different varieties of culinary styles mixed and developed over time to form a unique breed of its own, and thus the Chinese aristocrat cuisine is often called private cuisine. The current Chinese aristocrat cuisine is a mixture of Shandong cuisine, Huaiyang cuisine and Cantonese cuisine. As Beijing was the capital of the last three Chinese dynasties, most of the Chinese aristocrat cuisine originated in Beijing. Currently, there are a total of nine varieties of Chinese aristocrat cuisine.

== Confucian cuisine ==
Confucius has been deified and glorified in Chinese history, and has been posthumously awarded numerous ranks and titles by various Chinese emperors in Chinese history. The descendants of Confucius enjoyed the special privilege and status rewarded by the Chinese imperial dynasties, and Confucian cuisine is the cuisine developed by these descendants of Confucius as a result of such special social status. The special social status is further strengthened by the fact that in Qing Dynasty, one of Confucius' offspring married Qianlong Emperor's daughter. The majority of the dishes of the Confucian cuisine can directly trace their origin to Qianlong era.

The characteristics of Confucian cuisine includes a wide selection of ingredients, seasonal harvest available, emphasis on freshness and nutritious value, extravagant and lavish banquets in strict social stratification order, and artistic presentation of each dish of visual luxury. The most luxurious banquet of Confucian cuisine consists of a hundred ninety-six dishes served in four hundred and four tableware, most of which made from silver. The number one dish of Confucian cuisine is the edible bird's nest, for which Confucian cuisine is most famous. The edible bird's nest is the dish highest rank of dish to honor guests. Confucian cuisine are presented in several different classes banquets for different level of extravagance.

== Dongpo cuisine ==
Dongpo cuisine (Dong-po-cai, 东坡菜) was originally created by Su Shi, the famous Chinese writer, poet, painter, calligrapher, pharmacologist, gastronomist, and a statesman of the Song dynasty, mostly during his years of exile. Named after Su Shi's art name, the most famous dish of Dongpo cuisine is perhaps Dongpo pork.

The most frequently used cooking methods includes simmer, stew, and roast, with the original flavor of the material retained. Because Dongpo cuisine was created in his exile era, the food consisted of common materials, as opposed to the expensive and rare materials that are more commonly used in other styles of Chinese aristocrat cuisine. Another characteristic of Dongpo cuisine is that the origin of most of the dishes can be traced back to the Su Shi's literary work. The other important characteristic of Dongpo cuisine is that the heavy use of gravy and sauce.

== Li family's cuisine ==
Li family's cuisine (Li-Jia-Cai, 厉家菜) is developed from Chinese imperial cuisine, and it is a fusion of Chinese imperial cuisine and Beijing cuisine, supplemented by dishes created by their own. Contrary to the rest styles of Chinese aristocrat cuisine that are developed from and based on regional cuisines of southern China, Li family's cuisine is developed from and based on northern regional cuisines of northern China: The original creator of Li family's cuisine, Mr. Li Shun-Qing (厉顺庆), was a Qing Dynasty subject with rank of lieutenant general (都统, Dutong), in charge of Empress Dowager Cixi's Imperial Household Department, and he memorized the menus of Empress Dowager's meals at work, and then wrote down after returning home, and the menus were kept in the family for more than a century.

One of the most significant characteristics of Li family's cuisine is that all dishes are made from natural ingredients, without using any artificial or synthetic material/ingredients/chemical/colors. In addition to not using any artificial or synthetic material/ingredients/chemical/colors, all food are cooked by traditional methods without using any modern cookware, instead, everything is cooked on traditional Chinese hearth. Another characteristic of Li family's cuisine is that there is not any menu so customers cannot place any order. Instead, customers must eat whatever is available when the restaurant serves. Only banquets are available, which includes fifteen appetizers, seven main courses and two sweets.

== Mei family's cuisine ==
Mei family's cuisine (Mei-Jia-Cai, 梅家菜) is created by Mr. Wang Shou-Shan (王寿山), the personal chef of the most famous Peking opera artists in modern Chinese theater, Mr. Mei Lanfang. Mei family's cuisine is a fusion of Huaiyang cuisine and another style of Chinese aristocrat cuisine, Tan family's cuisine.

There are approximately six hundred dishes available in Mei family's cuisine, none of the dishes are flavored heavily, and each dish is not large in term of size. Another important characteristic of Mei family's cuisine is that dishes are seasonal because ingredients used are harvested according to the season, and cooking methods used also vary according to seasonal change of weather.

== Red Chamber cuisine ==
Red Chamber cuisine (Hong-Lou-Cai, 红楼菜) is the cuisine described in Dream of the Red Chamber, with a total of more than 180 dishes. Red Chamber cuisine is mainly developed from Huaiyang cuisine, supplemented by Nanjing cuisine.

Restoration attempts of Red Chamber cuisine begun in the 1970s, and after nearly four decades of research, various places have succeeded, with the most cuisine served in banquets (Red Chamber banquet, or Hong-Lou-Yan, 红楼宴) by restaurants in Beijing, Yangzhou, Taiwan and Macau. The complete banquet usually includes forty-eight dishes, with the simpler banquet of Macau only serving thirty-nine dishes. The most famous Red Chamber cuisine is presented by Jin-Lai-Yu-Xuan (来今雨轩) restaurant in Zhongshan Park in Beijing, and a total of more than five dozen dishes are offered. Mr. Sun Da-Li (孙大力), the head chef of Lai-Ji-Yu-Xuan was the first chef in Beijing to research and restore Red Chamber cuisine back in 1983, and most of the cooking methods he developed for the cuisine have since become the standard for Red Chamber cuisine.

== Suiyuan cuisine ==
Suiyuan cuisine (Sui-Yuan-Cai, 随园菜) was created by Chinese scholar, poet, writer and gastronomist Yuan Mei of Qing Dynasty, and recorded in his work Suiyuan shidan, known in English as either the Food Lists of the Garden of Contentment, Menus from the Garden of Contentment, or Recipes from Sui Garden.

Suiyuan cuisine is mostly developed from Nanjing cuisine at the time, which is supplemented by the dishes developed from Zhejiang cuisine, Anhui cuisine and other regional sub-styles of Jiangsu cuisine. The most important trait of Suiyuan cuisine is the emphasis on the main ingredient of each dish, so that each dish has its own unique taste, thus none of the dishes would have blended/mixed tastes of multiple flavors. Other important traits of Suiyuan cuisine included the strict selection of ingredients/materials used and careful cooking methods, but the cuisine was subsequently lost in history for various reasons. In the 1980s, the Mr. Xue Wen-Long (薛文龙), the head chef of Jinling Hotel, successfully restored all 326 dishes recorded in Suiyuan Shidan after two decades of research. Another great contributor of the restoration of Suiyuan cuisine is Mr. Bai Ji-Chang (白常继), the head chef of Beijing North and South Catering Limited Company (南北一家餐饮有限公司), who also further developed several dozen more dishes based on Suiyuan Shidan, and by the end of 2016, a total of over 380 dishes of Suiyuan cuisine have become available.

== Tan family's cuisine ==
Tan family's cuisine is the most representative of Chinese aristocrat cuisine mainly based on and developed from Cantonese cuisine, and it is a fusion of Cantonese cuisine and regional cuisines of northern China, with more than 200 dishes available today.

The most significant characteristic of Tan family's cuisine is its taste; the salinity and sweetness of the dishes is moderate, fitting the taste of both northern and southern Chinese. Like Cantonese, the original flavor of the food is also emphasized in Tan family's cuisine. The cooking method most frequently used includes roast, simmer, stew and steam. Tan family's cuisine is famous for shark fin, abalone, and sea cucumbers.

== Yunlin cuisine ==
Yunlin cuisine (Yun-Lin-Cai, 云林菜) was originally created by the famous 12th-century Chinese painter and gastronomist Ni Zan, record in his work titled A Collection of Diet System of Yunlin Hall (云林堂饮食制度集). A total of forty-two dishes were recorded in Ni Zan's work, and by the end of 2014, sixteen dishes of the forty-two have been successfully restored.

Yunlin cuisine is developed from Wuxi cuisine and inherits its characteristic of sweet taste and heavy usage of oil and sauce. However, Yunlin cuisine emphasizes the other characteristic, which is freshness, and the cooking method frequently used includes steam, boil, braise, and fast boil in hot water. To meet the demand of the modern people, such as health concerns such as diabetics, some of the restored dishes have been modified, such as the reduction of sweetness by using less sugar. Another characteristic of Yunlin cuisine is the importance of the adding seasoning in a strict order to obtain the layered tastes.

== Zhili (Chinese) aristocrat cuisine ==
Zhili (Chinese) aristocrat cuisine (直隶官府菜) originated in Baoding in Ming dynasty, matured in Qing dynasty, with a history of approximately six-hundred years. The flavor of dishes of Zhili (Chinese) aristocrat cuisine is generally slightly salty.
