= Nanjing salted duck =

Chinese duck dish

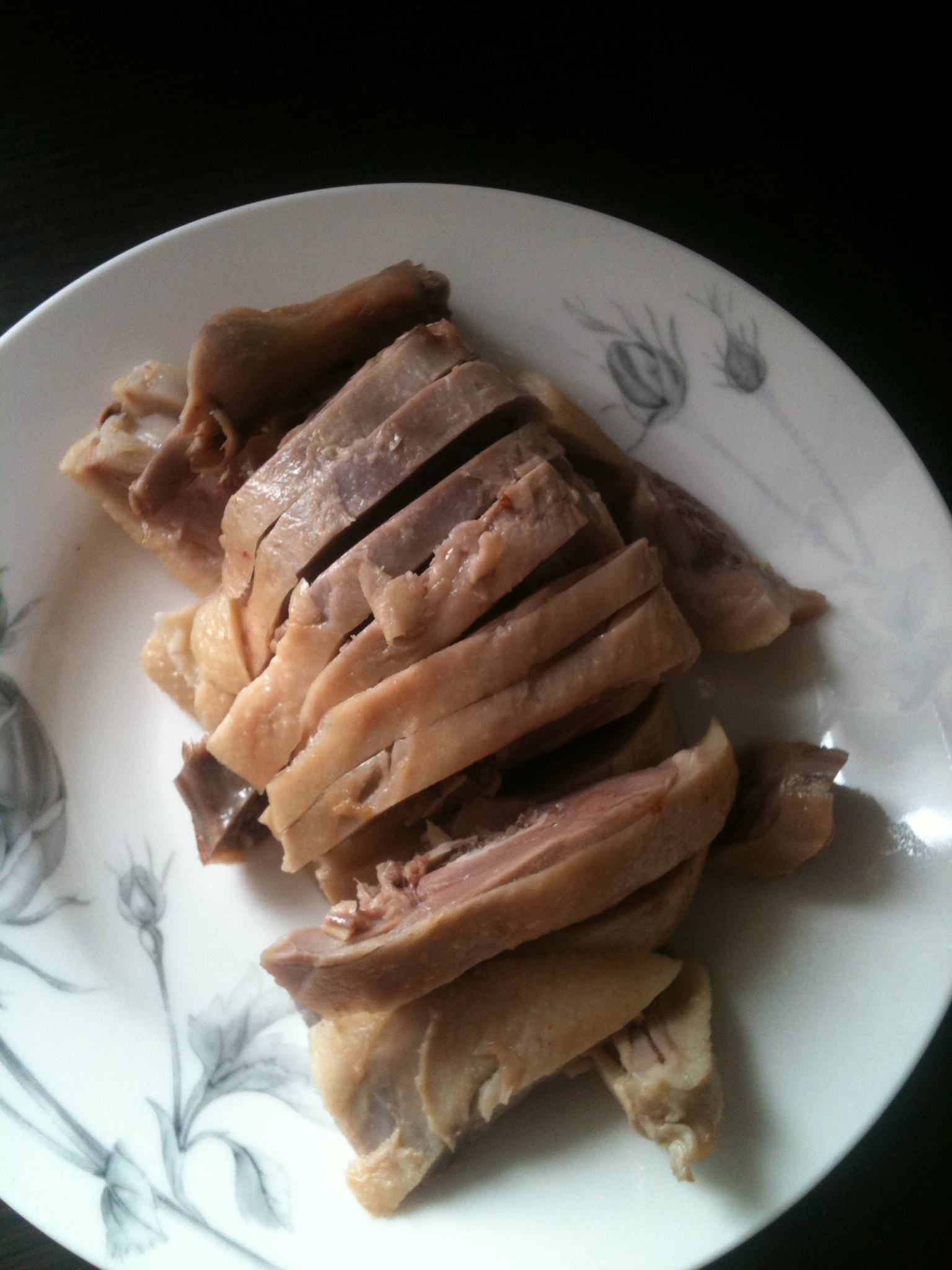
- Alternative names: Chinese: 盐水鸭, 鹽水鴨
- Type: Duck dishes
- Place of origin: China
- Region or state: Nanjing
- Associated cuisine: Jinling cuisine, Jiangsu cuisine
- Similar dishes: Peking duck

Nanjing salted duck (simplified Chinese: 盐水鸭; traditional Chinese: 鹽水鴨; pinyin: yánshuǐ yā) is a local duck dish from Nanjing, China. The history of the dish goes back hundreds of years, in legend to the 14th century, but it grew more famous during the Qing Dynasty. The white duck-meat is tender and has some fat without being greasy.

Nanjing is a culinary centre noted for its Jinling dishes, especially quality ducks and a whole variety of duck dishes. Over 100 million ducks per year are eaten in the city of 8 million.

The popularity of Nanjing salted duck resembles Peking duck's in northern China. Some historians believe that the ducks were first raised as livestock by the Nanjing people more than two thousand years ago. The Nanjing salted duck is recorded as a gourmet entry in the List of Jinling's Delicacies by the modern Chinese gourmet Tongzhi Zhang. The flavour of Nanjing salted duck is developed through a series of steps, including dry-curing, salting, roasting and boiling, which has the effect of oxidizing and degrading the duck's fat.

Ducks raised in autumn are most favoured by some diners, based on the belief that their flesh smells sweetly of osmanthus. Osmanthus is closely associated with the dish; some restaurants add it to the broth during autumn, naming the resulting dish "osmanthus duck". In parts of China, taro and salted duck are combined.

== Place of origin ==
Duck products are widely eaten in China for their flavour and perceived nutritional value. Nanjing, a city on the southern bank of the Yangtze River has a long history of duck farming, with some evidence that ducks were raised as livestock in the old city of Nanjing more than 2,000 years ago. In the early Ming Dynasty (1368-1644), the salted duck was widely eaten by the general population as well as the emperor, Zhu Yuanzhang.

== Legendary origins ==
One legend holds that when Zhu Yuanzhang was the emperor (with Nanjing as the capital in the 14th century), there was a dispute of sorts, and an edict was issued to kill all the roosters in the city. This solved a noise problem, but the result was no chicken to eat. The people of Nanjing had to eat duck instead, which gave rise to the prominence in Nanjing of duck dishes like Nanjing salted duck. Other accounts claim that Nanjing was famed for duck dishes centuries earlier, dating even to the Southern Dynasties (420~589 A.D.).

During the Qing Dynasty (1644-1911), near the Fuzimiao, the examination venue for the imperial examinations, major restaurants and teahouses specialised in preparing brine duck to satisfy the taste buds of students.

== Gastronomical records ==
The gourmet entry for Nanjing salted duck was recorded in Tongzhi Zhang's List of Jinling's Delicacies published in February 1947, one of the 61 entries in his selection. These 61 gourmet entries cover a wide range of local delicacies that Tongzhi Zhang has tasted in Nanjing during his lifetime, including but not limited to raw materials, processed foods and cooked dishes.

Tongzhi Zhang (1875-1948), who came from the present Luhe district of Nanjing, was not only a highly respected scholar, educator, poet, calligrapher and painter in contemporary China, but also a gourmet. The fall of the Qing dynasty in 1911 forced Tongzhi Zhang to leave officialdom for Nanjing, where he spent the rest of his life. List of Jinling's Delicacies is included in Nanjing wenxian (Nanjing documents), then edited by Tongzhi Zhang himself, as a food review that is a testament to his ability to console himself by sampling the local cuisine of Nanjing. In addition to Nanjing salted duck, many of the 61 gourmet entries recorded by Tongzhi Zhang are still representative of Nanjing's local specialties these days.

According to Tongzhi Zhang's comments, for the meat of the Nanjing salted duck to be fatty enough, the ducks used for cooking must be carefully reared, with particular attention to the feed fed to the ducks. The distinctive flavour, perfect tenderness and moderate saltiness of Nanjing salted duck are all due to the right amount of time and salt used in the curing process. This is also due to the moist heat cooking technique used in the production of Nanjing salted duck, which makes the duck meat to be fleshy and firm and full of juices. It is therefore crucial to control the temperature during the cooking process of the duck, otherwise neither the aroma nor the taste of the duck meat will reach the standard value, and it may even be said to be irrelevant to the quality of authentic Nanjing salted duck. Finally, Tongzhi Zhang also mentions the reputation and popularity of the salted duck produced and sold by Hanfuxing Shop in Nanjing because of its rich and attractive aroma and fatty but not greasy taste.

== Cooking method ==
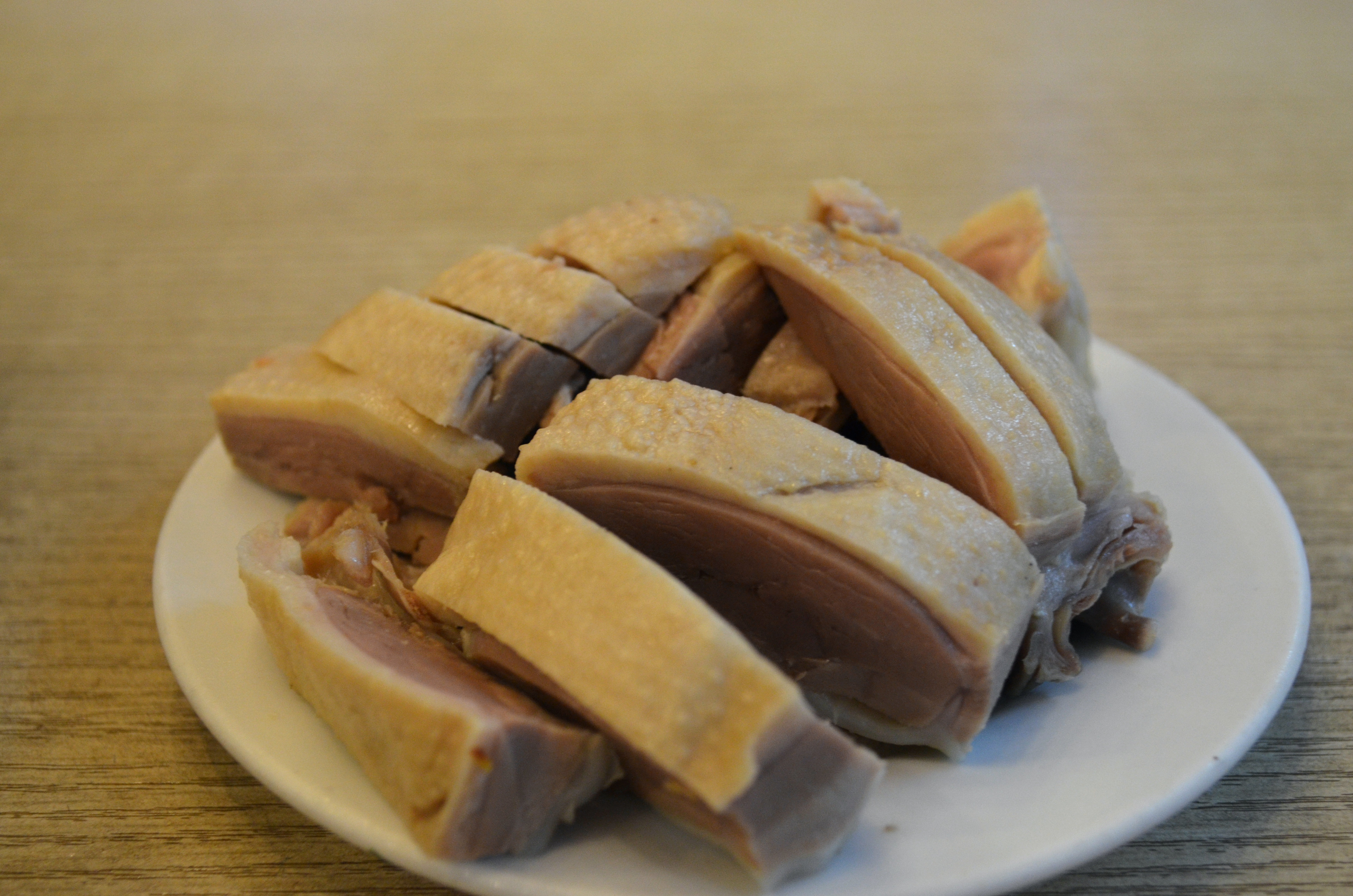
Prepared salted duck on the table.

The duck, with wings and feet removed, is cleaned and drained. Spices and recipes vary, but a simple approach is to rub pepper into the body with more stuffed inside. The duck is cooked in a pot, pickled (1–2 hours in summer, 4 hours in winter), and hung to dry in a well ventilated area. The duck is then simmered in water with ginger, onion, and star anise. Finally, the duck is cut into strips.

== Flavour and production techniques ==
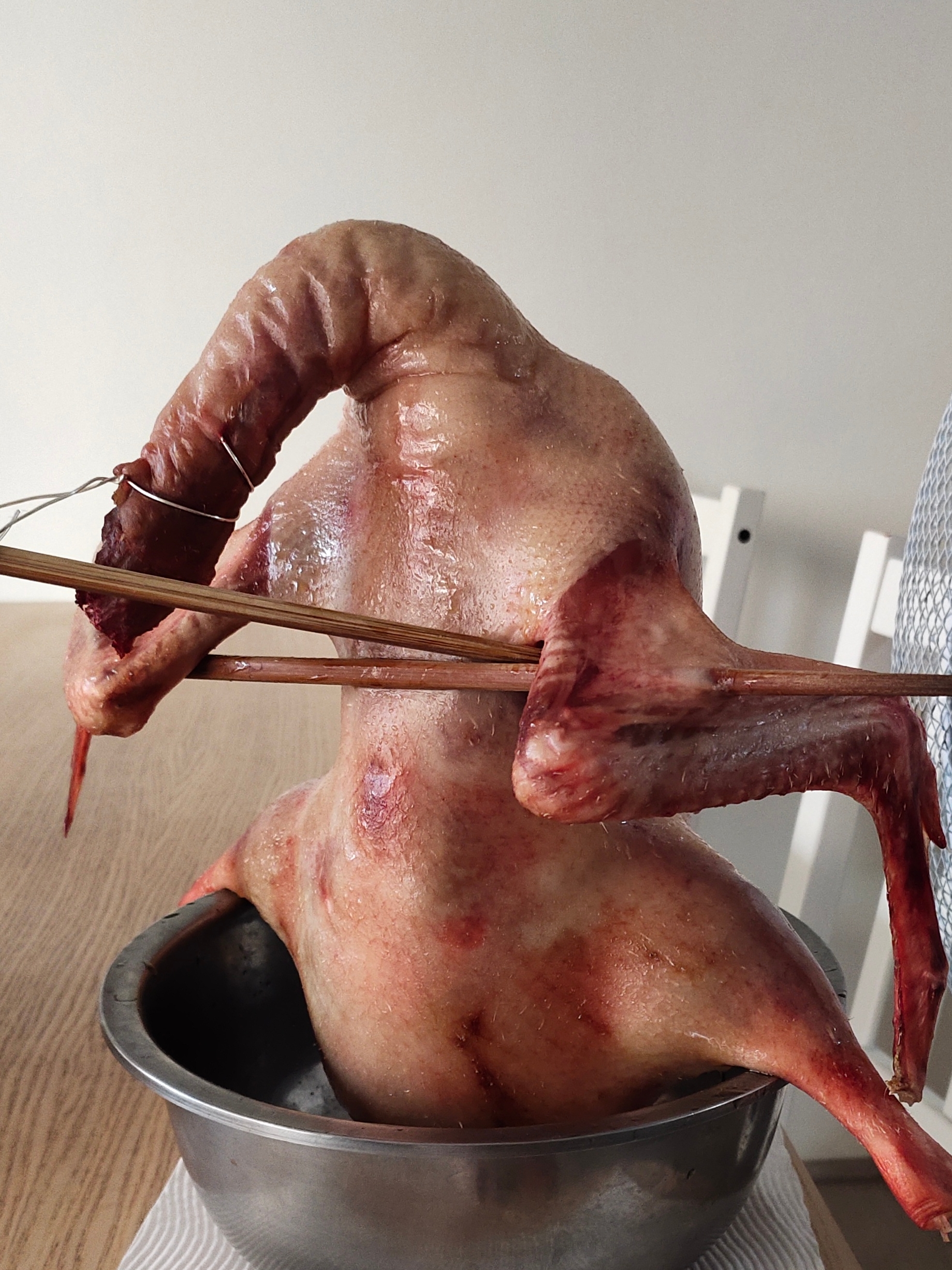
The dry-curing step in the process of making Nanjing salted duck at home.

Among the many traditional meat products in China, Nanjing salted duck is one of the few processed meat products cooked at low temperatures. As a famous local appetiser, Nanjing salted duck is well known for its tender and flavourful taste and meticulous processing. Although Nanjing salted duck may appear to be an ordinary dish at first glance, its unique and rich flavour has made it a cornerstone of Jinling cuisine, thus not only rivalling Peking duck in terms of taste, but also enjoying similar popularity and reputation as Peking duck. Jinling cuisine is the ancient Chinese name for Nanjing cuisine, which is subordinate to Jiangsu cuisine, one of the eight major cuisines of China, and can be traced back to the Six Dynasties (222-589 A.D.).

Cooked duck products are a popular food not only in China, but all over the world, and Nanjing salted duck is one of the most well-known ones. Nanjing salted duck is cooked in the traditional Chinese brine method at low temperatures, and its tender and flavourful taste has made it a world-famous local specialty. In China, brine is recognised as a means of treating raw meat with only a bloody smell, and it is widely used in the preparation of various cooked meat products with traditional characteristics. As a traditional cured meat cooked with this technique, the flavour is the most important sensory quality and characteristic of Nanjing salted duck. Due to the high unsaturated fatty acid content of the duck, the oxidation and degradation of the fat are essential for the formation of the perfect taste of the duck meat, which is also the key to Nanjing salted duck's unique flavour. The production process involves a series of steps such as dry-curing, salting, roasting and boiling, all of which are essential, as they together contribute to the oxidation and degradation of the fat. When the products of fat degradation are increased, the typical and distinctive flavour of Nanjing salted duck is created and enhanced.

The dry-curing process makes an important contribution to the degradation of duck fat by accelerating its oxidation to a great extent throughout the production process of Nanjing salted duck. During the curing process, it is better if the whole duck is completely immersed in the aged brine, which is the salting step, and this is why other categories of cooked duck products never reach the flavour and quality standards of the Nanjing salted duck. The optimum ageing time for duck is 24 hours, which is more conducive to the processing and subsequent flavour formation of the salted duck and is also more suitable for real-life production. The ageing step often follows the brining (salting) and is somewhat similar to the processing of ham. As the ageing time increases, the water content of the duck meat decreases, so the dehydration caused by excessive ageing time can seriously affect the water locking capacity of the duck meat, which is detrimental to the oxidation of fat and thus hinders the formation and development of the flavour of Nanjing salted duck.

To summarise the whole process, in the dry-curing step, the salt inhibits the formation of bitterness, which contributes to the mellow taste and flavour of Nanjing salted duck; in the brining step, the taste and flavour of the duck are greatly enhanced after brine stewing; in the ageing step, the rapid reduction of fat in the duck makes the meat firmer; and the final boiling step further enhances the tender and tasty taste of the duck meat.

== Special recipes ==
The fame of Nanjing salted duck has long been known to have profoundly influenced many surrounding cities near Nanjing and has successfully made its way to the tables of people in Shanghai and Hangzhou. Just as mashed potatoes and turkey are the signature pairing for Thanksgiving dinner in the United States, taro and duck are the perfect combination for the Mid-Autumn Festival meal in Shanghai, China. The number of recipes developed by chefs in China using taro and duck, both in professional and private kitchens, is innumerable. In the Yangtze River Delta region of eastern China, it is a common practice to cut up peeled taro, stir-fry it with salt and spring onions, and then cook it in a pot with duck bought from a nearby delicatessen. In this case, the Nanjing salted duck, with its rich and attractive aroma and fatty but not greasy taste, is always one of the most popular choices. In Guangdong province of southern China, the soup-loving Cantonese people choose to put taro and duck together in a slow-cooked soup over low heat, which according to the principles and claims of traditional Chinese medical science, can soothe the dryness that people feel in the body during autumn.

== Honorary achievements ==
- In 2012, Nanjing salted duck was listed as a Chinese geographical indication agricultural product.
- In 2014, Modern Express, a local newspaper in Nanjing, launched a campaign in which Nanjing salted duck was named as one of the eight most popular dishes in Nanjing.
- In 2014, during the Youth Olympic Games held in Nanjing, Nanjing salted duck was included in the athletes' diet menu, thus giving athletes from all over the world the opportunity to taste this very representative Jiangsu specialty.

== See also ==
- List of duck dishes
