= Jiangsu cuisine =

Traditional cuisine of Jiangsu province, China

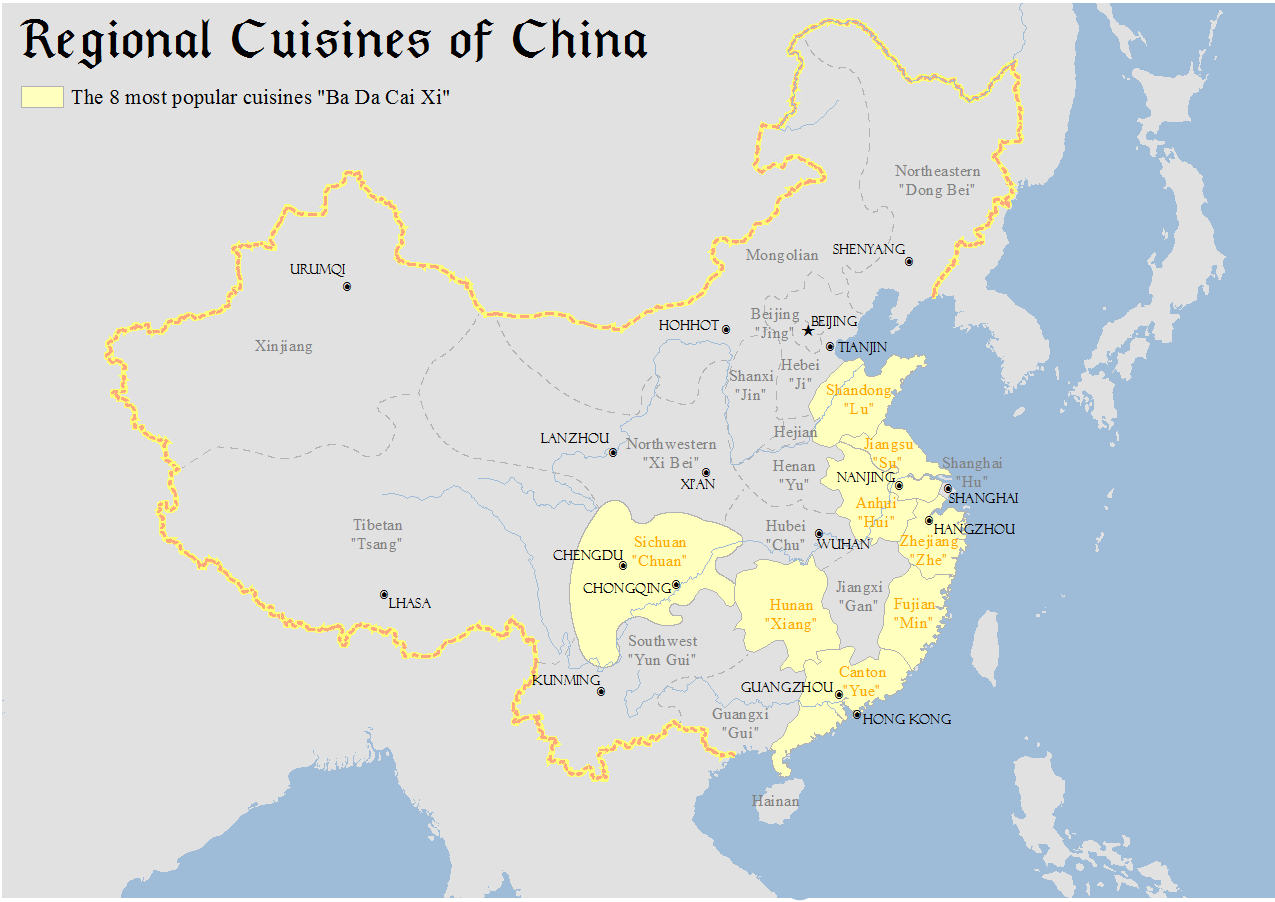
- Regions of China's "Eight Cuisines"
- Traditional Chinese: 江蘇菜
- Simplified Chinese: 江苏菜
Transcriptions
Standard Mandarin
- Hanyu Pinyin: Jiāngsū cài

Su cuisine
- Traditional Chinese: 蘇菜
- Simplified Chinese: 苏菜
Transcriptions
Standard Mandarin
- Hanyu Pinyin: Sū cài

Jiangsu cuisine (simplified Chinese: 江苏菜; traditional Chinese: 江蘇菜; pinyin: Jiāngsū cài), also known as Su cuisine (simplified Chinese: 苏菜; traditional Chinese: 蘇菜; pinyin: Sū cài), is one of the Eight Culinary Traditions of Chinese cuisine. It is derived from the native cooking styles of Jiangsu Province. In general, Jiangsu cuisine's texture is characterized as soft, but not to the point of mushy or falling apart. In addition, Jiangsu cuisine also focuses on heating temperature. For example, the meat tastes quite soft but would not separate from the bone when picked up. As the style of Jiangsu cuisine is typically practised near the sea, fish is a very common ingredient in cooking. Other characteristics include the strict selection of ingredients according to the seasons, with emphasis on the matching color and shape of each dish and using soup to improve flavor. The municipality of Shanghai was formerly a part of Jiangsu thus the great deal of similarity between the two, and Shanghai cuisine is sometimes classified as a part of Jiangsu cuisine.

== Regional variations ==
Jiangsu cuisine is sometimes simply called Su cuisine, and one of its major styles is Huaiyang cuisine. Although Huaiyang cuisine is one of several sub-regional styles within Jiangsu cuisine, it is widely seen in Chinese culinary circles as the most popular and prestigious style of Jiangsu cuisine – to a point where it is considered to be one of the four most influential regional schools (四大菜系) that dominate the culinary heritage of China, along with Cantonese cuisine, Shandong cuisine and Sichuan cuisine.

Jiangsu cuisine actually consists of several other sub-regional styles, including:

- Nanjing style: Its dishes emphasize an even taste and matching colors, with dishes incorporating river fish/shrimp and duck.
- Suzhou style: The emphasis is on the selection of ingredients. It has a stronger taste than Nanjing style cuisine as well as a tendency to be sweeter than the other varieties of Jiangsu cuisine.
- Wuxi style: Wuxi's proximity to Lake Tai means it is notable for a wide variety of freshwater produce, such as the "Three Whites" – white bait (银鱼; 銀魚; yín yú), white fish (白鱼; 白魚; bái yú) and white shrimp (白虾; 白蝦; bái xiā).
- Nantong style: The dishes emphasize a flavor of freshness on the ingredients which cover a variety of seafood, since Nantong is located at the intersection of the local Hao River, the Yangtze River and the Yellow Sea.

=== Wuxi-style cuisine ===
In Wuxi, the common cooking method is characterized by the addition of sugar and soy sauce to many savory dishes, often in the form of hongshao (红烧; 紅燒; hóngshāo; 'red braised'). This often results in a fragrant, caramelized flavor. In addition, Wuxi cuisine often has sweeter versions of dishes found in its neighboring regions.

Notable Wuxi dishes include:

English	Traditional Chinese	Simplified Chinese	Pinyin	Notes
Braised spare ribs	紅燒排骨	红烧排骨	hóngshāo páigǔ	Known for its melt-in-mouth texture and sweet taste.
Fried gluten balls	油面筋	油面筋	yóu miàn jīn	Can be stuffed with meat like a meatball or stir-fried with vegetables on its own.
Chinese carp soup	鯽魚湯	鲫鱼汤	jìyú tāng	The soup is milky white.
Chinese carp with fried shallots	蔥燒鯽魚	葱烧鲫鱼	cōng shāo jìyú	Cooked with soy and sugar until caramelized.
Whitebait omelette	銀魚炒蛋	银鱼炒蛋	yínyú chǎo dàn	Whitebait with omelette or scrambled eggs.
Wuxi-style xiaolongbao	無錫小籠包	无锡小笼包	Wúxī xiǎolóngbāo	A much sweeter version as compared to Shanghai-style xiaolongbao.

== Gallery ==
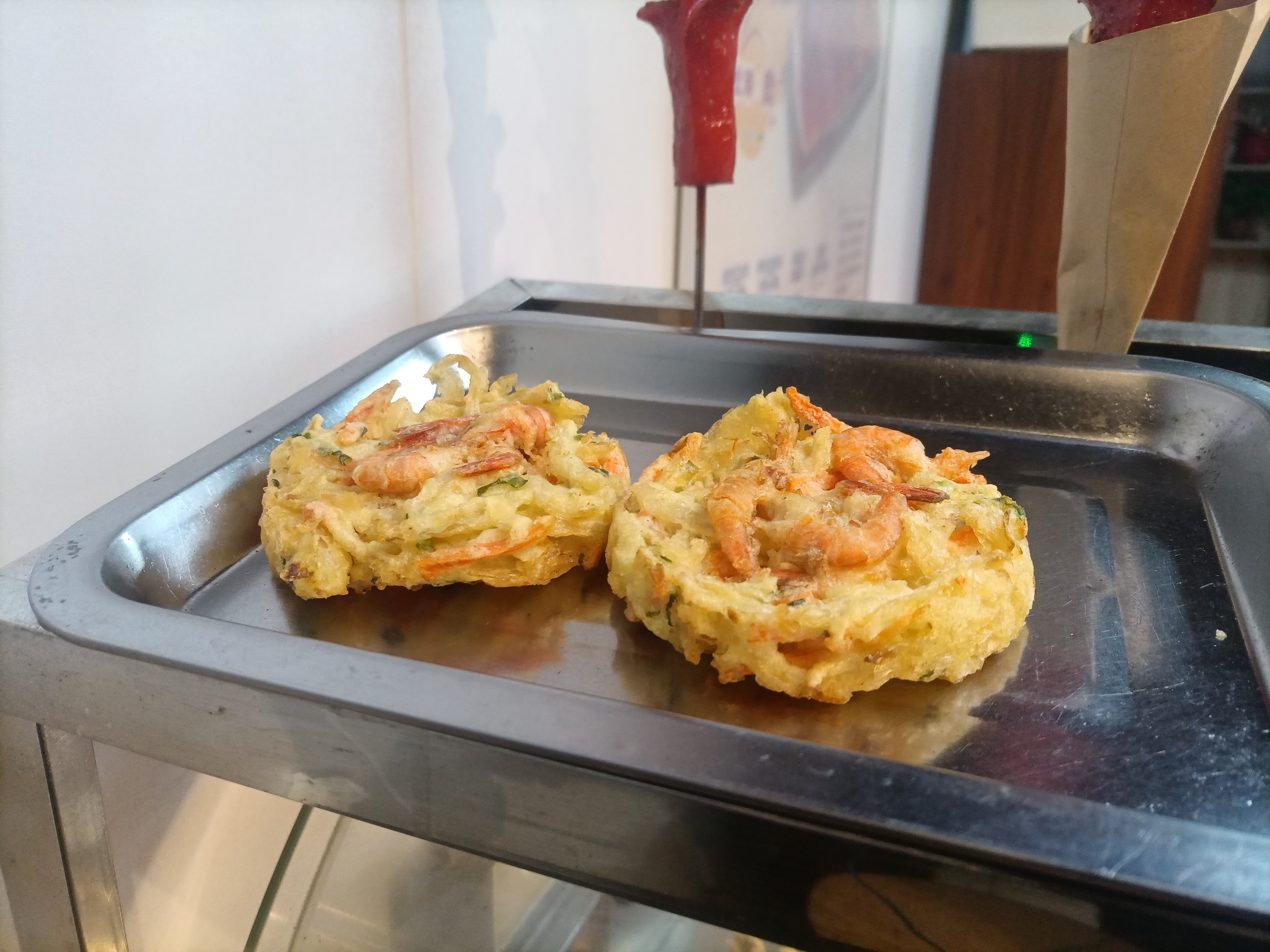
Shrimp cakes

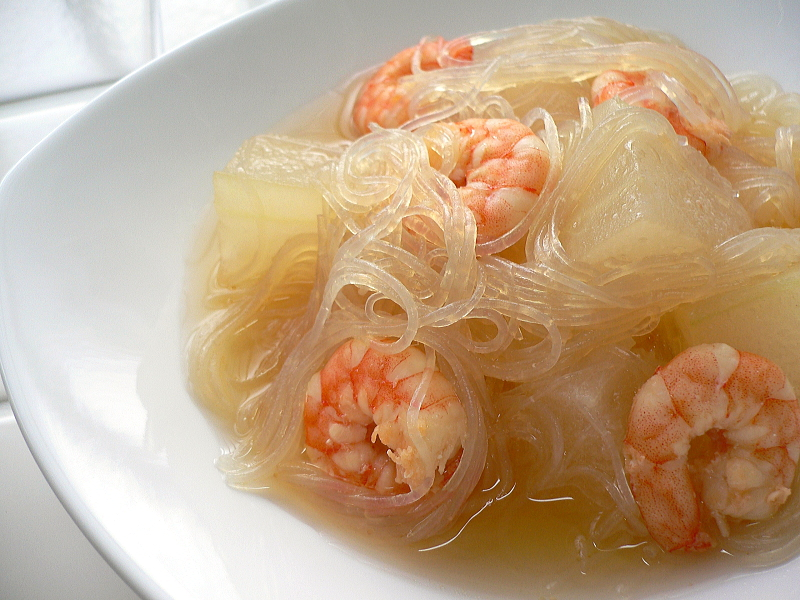
Tougan shrimp soup

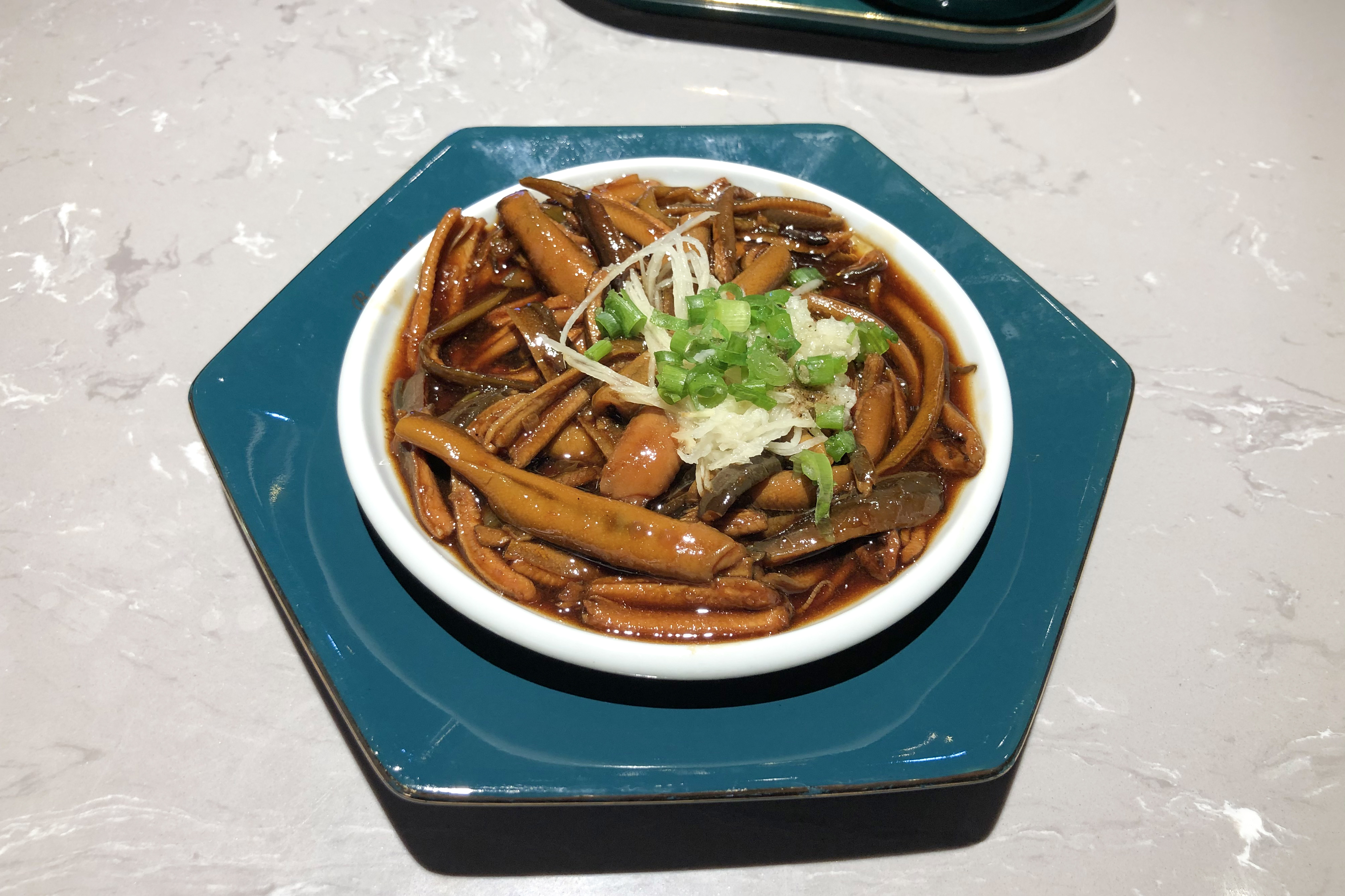
Stir-fried shredded eel with hot oil and ginger

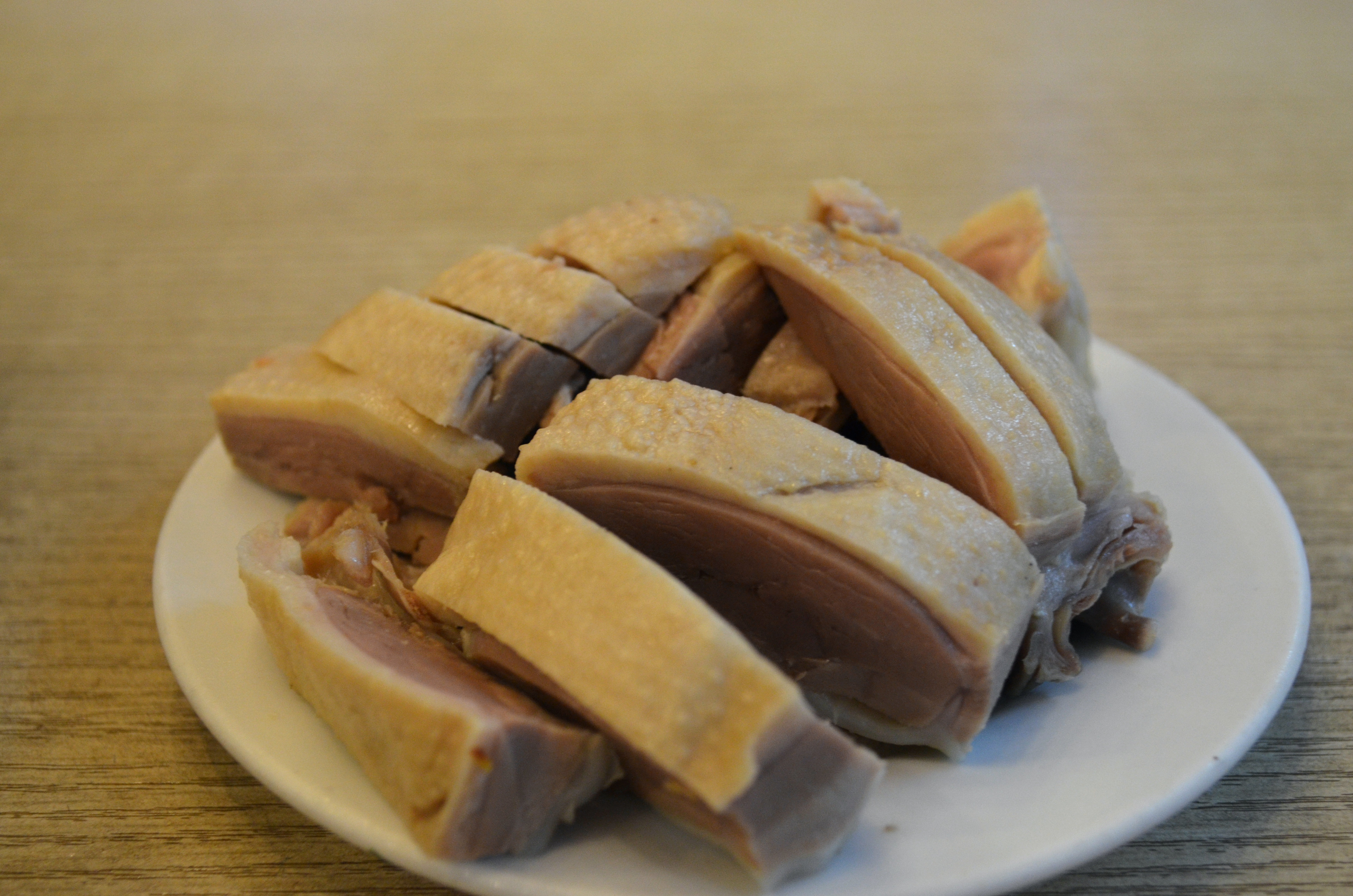
Nanjing salted duck

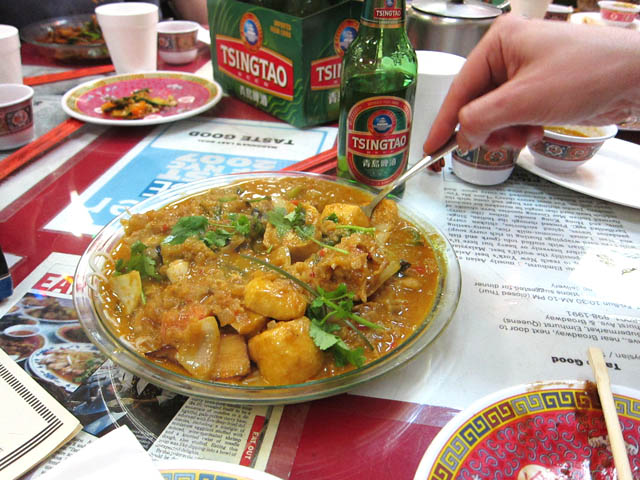
Fish head casserole

== See also ==
- List of Chinese dishes
