= Chinese regional cuisine =

Regional cuisines of China

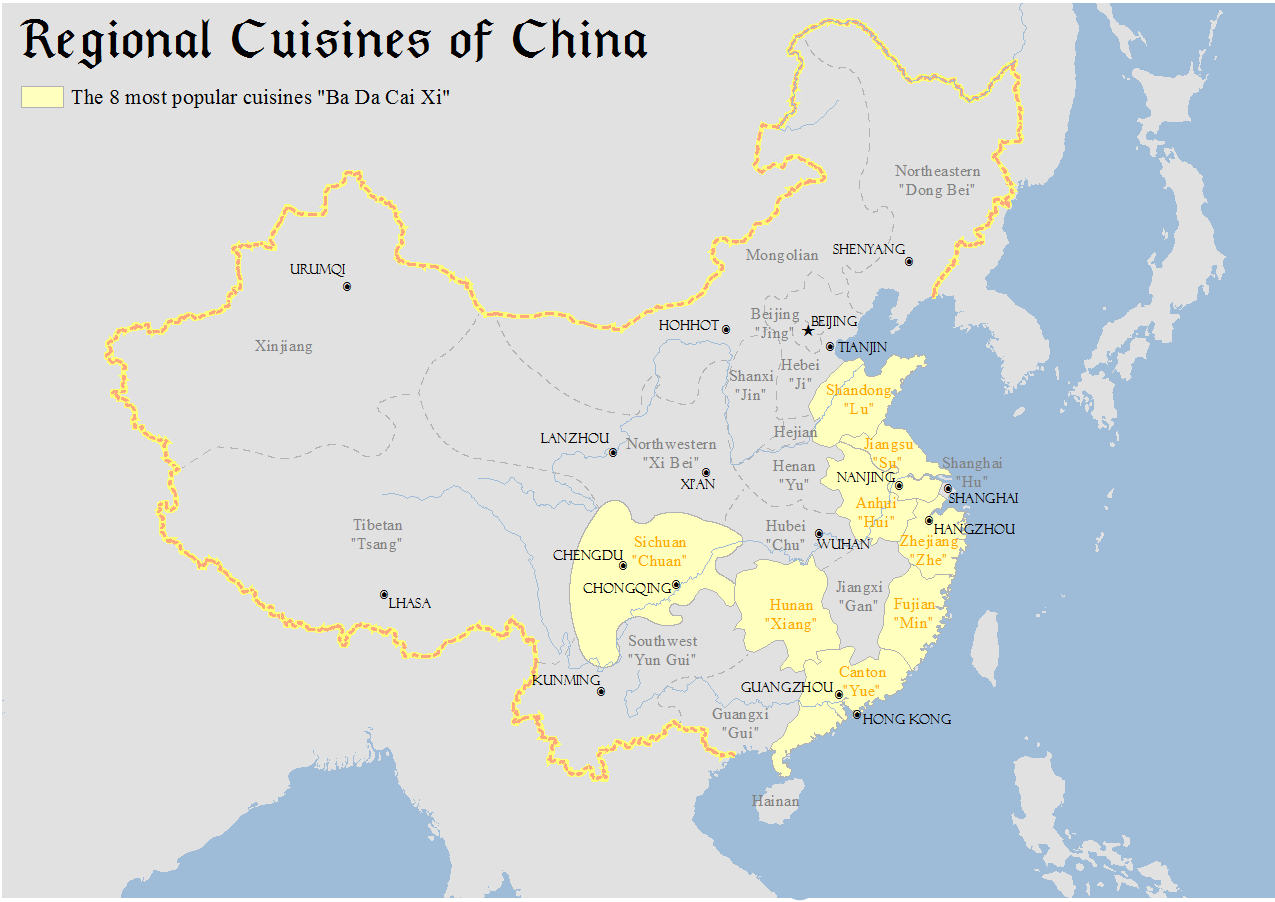
Map showing major regional cuisines of China

Chinese regional cuisines are amongst the many different cuisines found in different provinces and prefectures of China as well as from larger overseas Chinese communities.

A number of different styles contribute to Chinese cuisine, but perhaps the best known and most influential are Guangdong cuisine, Shandong cuisine, Huaiyang cuisine, and Sichuan cuisine. These styles are distinctive from one another due to the factors such as availability of resources, climate, geography, history, cooking techniques and lifestyle. One style may favor the generous use of garlic and shallots over chili and spices, while another may favor preparing seafood over other meats and fowl.

Jiangsu cuisine favors cooking techniques such as braising and stewing, while Sichuan cuisine employs baking. Hairy crab is a highly sought-after local delicacy in Shanghai, as it can be found in lakes within the region. Peking duck and dim sum are other popular dishes well known outside of China.

Based on the raw materials and ingredients used, the method of preparation and cultural differences, a variety of foods with different flavors and textures are prepared in different regions of the country. Many traditional regional cuisines rely on basic methods of preservation such as drying, salting, pickling, and fermentation.

== Eight Great Traditions ==
Historically, the Four Great Traditions (Chinese: 四大菜系; pinyin: Sìdà càixì) of Chinese cuisine are Chuan, Lu, Yue and Huaiyang, representing West, North, South and East China cuisine correspondingly. However, in modern times the list is often expanded to the Eight Great Traditions (Chinese: 八大菜系; pinyin: Bādà càixì), which are as follows:

=== Guangdong ===
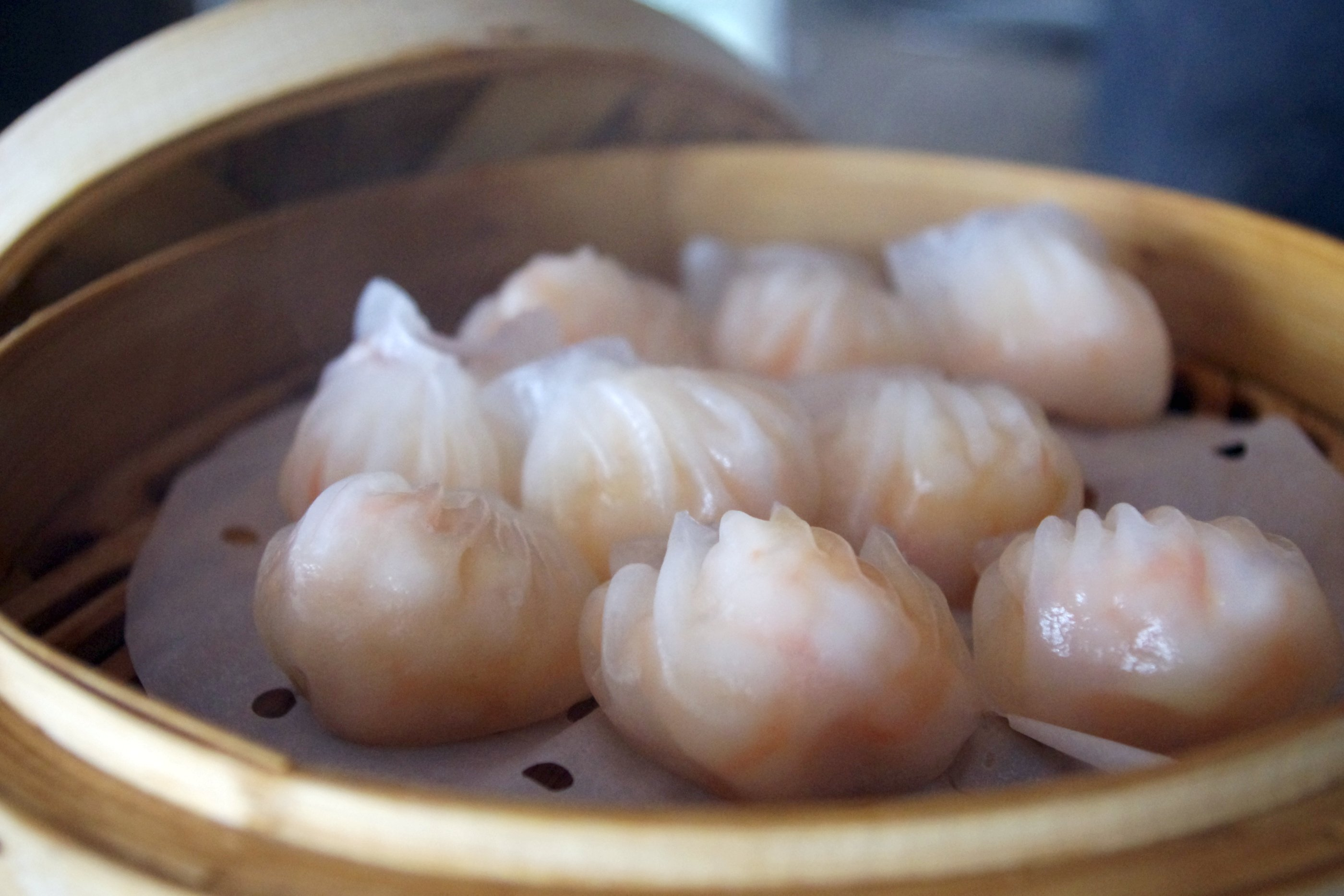
Har gow shrimp dumplings are a classic Cantonese dim sum dish

Guangdong or Cantonese cuisine (Chinese: 粤菜; pinyin: yuècài) is a regional cuisine that emphasizes the minimal use of sauce which brings out the original taste of food itself. It is known for dim sum, a Cantonese term for small hearty dishes, which became popular in Hong Kong in the early 20th century. These bite-sized portions are prepared using traditional cooking methods such as frying, steaming, stewing, and baking. It is designed so that one person may taste an assortment of different dishes in bite-size. Some of these may include rice rolls, lotus leaf rice, turnip cakes, buns, jiaozi-style dumplings, stir-fried green vegetables, congee porridge, soups, etc. The Cantonese style of dining, yum cha, combines the variety of dim sum dishes with the drinking of tea. Yum cha literally means "drink tea".

=== Sichuan ===
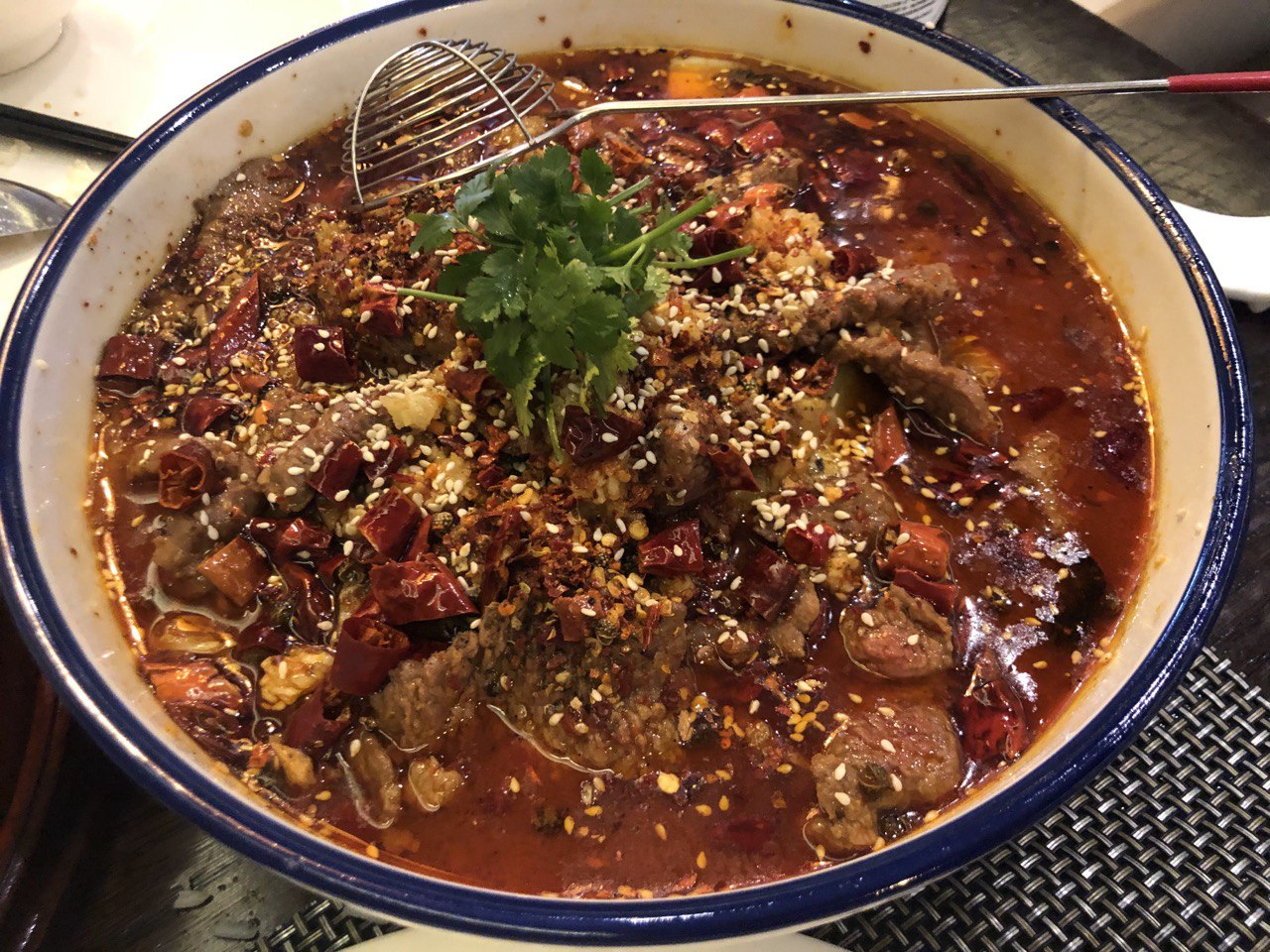
Shuizhu with beef, a traditional Sichuan dish.

Sichuan cuisine (Chinese: 川菜; pinyin: chuāncài; spelled Szechuan or Szechwan in the once-common postal romanization) is a style of Chinese cuisine originating from the Sichuan Province of southwestern China, famed for bold flavors, particularly the pungency and spiciness resulting from liberal use of garlic and chili peppers, as well as the unique flavor of the Sichuan peppercorn, famed for the mouthfeel it gives, (花椒; huājiāo) and facing heaven pepper (朝天椒; cháotiān jiāo). Peanuts, sesame paste, and ginger are also prominent ingredients in this style.

=== Anhui ===
Anhui cuisine (徽菜; huīcài or 徽州菜; huīzhōu cài) is derived from the native cooking styles of the Huangshan Mountains region in China and is similar to Jiangsu cuisine, but with less emphasis on seafood and more on a wide variety of local herbs and vegetables. Anhui Province is particularly endowed with fresh bamboo and mushroom crops.

=== Shandong ===
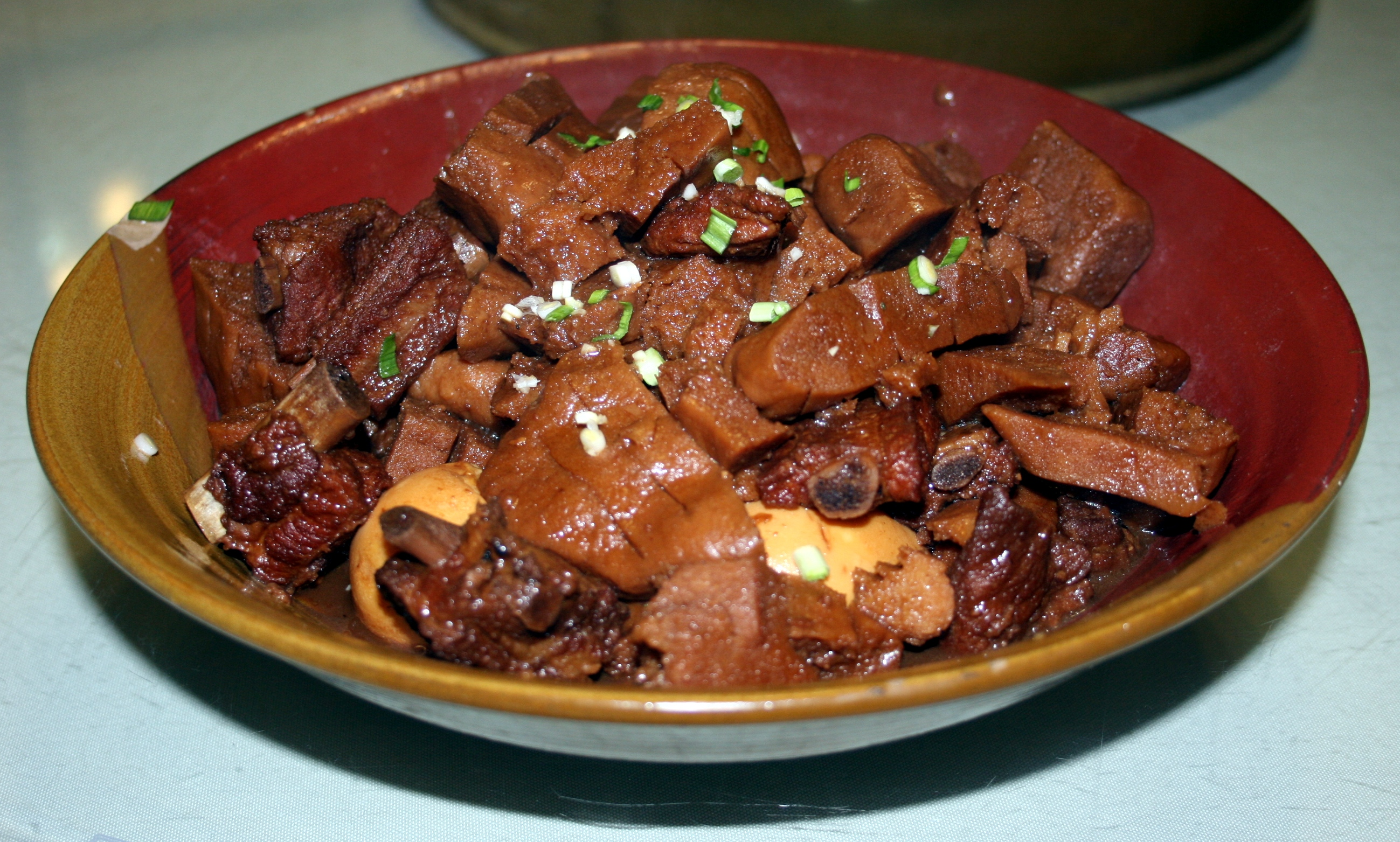
Shandong-style braised spare ribs with gluten (面筋红烧排骨; 麵筋紅燒排骨; miànjīn hóngshāo páigǔ)

Shandong cuisine (鲁菜; lǔcài), also commonly known as Lu cuisine, is a style of Chinese cuisine originating from the Shandong Province. Shandong cuisine enjoyed significant patronage from the imperial families of the Ming and Qing dynasties, contributing prominently to imperial cuisine and gaining popularity across North China. Shandong cuisine encompasses a diverse range of cooking techniques and utilizes a variety of seafood ingredients. It is characterized by its incorporation of both clear broth and creamy soups. Common offerings on local menus often include braised abalone, fried sea cucumbers, sweet and sour carp, braised pork intestines, and Dezhou chicken, a marinated chicken dish originating from the city of Dezhou.

=== Fujian ===
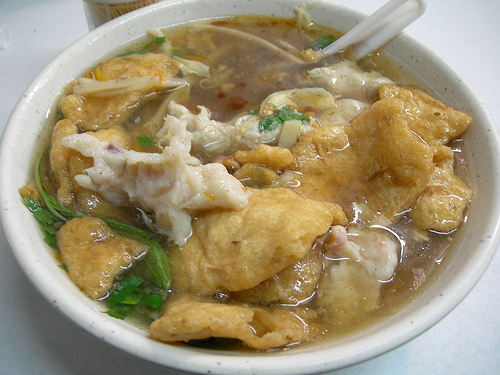
A bowl of Fujian thick soup, or geng (羹)

Fujian cuisine (闽菜; mǐncài) is influenced by Fujian's coastal position and mountainous terrain. Woodland produce such as edible mushrooms and bamboo shoots are also utilized. Slicing techniques are valued in the cuisine and utilized to enhance the flavor, aroma, and texture of seafood and other foods. Fujian cuisine is often served in a broth or soup, with cooking techniques including braising, stewing, steaming, and boiling.

=== Jiangsu ===
Jiangsu cuisine (苏菜; sūcài) is one of the major components of Chinese cuisine, which consists of the styles of Huai'an, Yangzhou, Nanjing, Suzhou and Zhenjiang dishes. It is especially popular in the lower reach of the Yangtze River. Huaiyang cuisine, one of the Four Great Traditions, is a style of Jiangsu cuisine.

Typical courses of Jiangsu cuisine are Jinling salted dried duck (Nanjing's most famous dish), crystal meat (pork heels in a bright, brown sauce), clear crab shell meatballs (pork meatballs in crab shell powder, fatty, yet fresh), and Yangzhou steamed jerky strips (dried tofu, chicken, ham and pea leaves).

=== Hunan ===
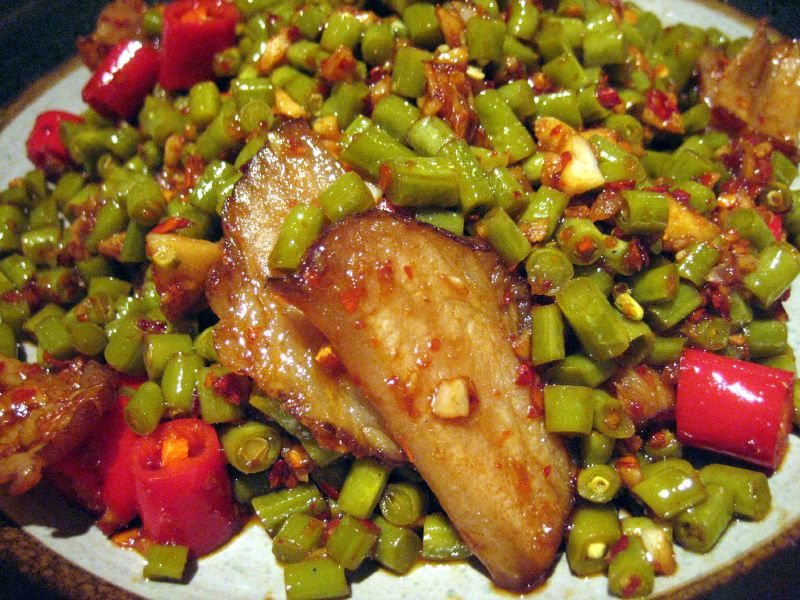
Hunan cured ham with pickled yardlong beans

Hunan cuisine (湘菜; Xiāngcài) is well known for its hot spicy flavor, fresh aroma, and deep color. Common cooking techniques include stewing, stir-frying, pot-roasting, braising, and smoking. Due to the high agricultural output of the region, there are many varied ingredients for Hunan dishes. Hunan cuisine is called Xiāngcài in China, because the abbreviation of Hunan Province is Xiāng (湘). Some typical dishes of Hunan cuisine are steaming smoked meat, stew fish, and rice noodle soup. Besides spicy, Hunan cuisine, especially western Hunan, also emphasizes sourness. Therefore, different kinds of pickles are popular in Hunan; for example, douchi is a type of fermented and salted black soybean.

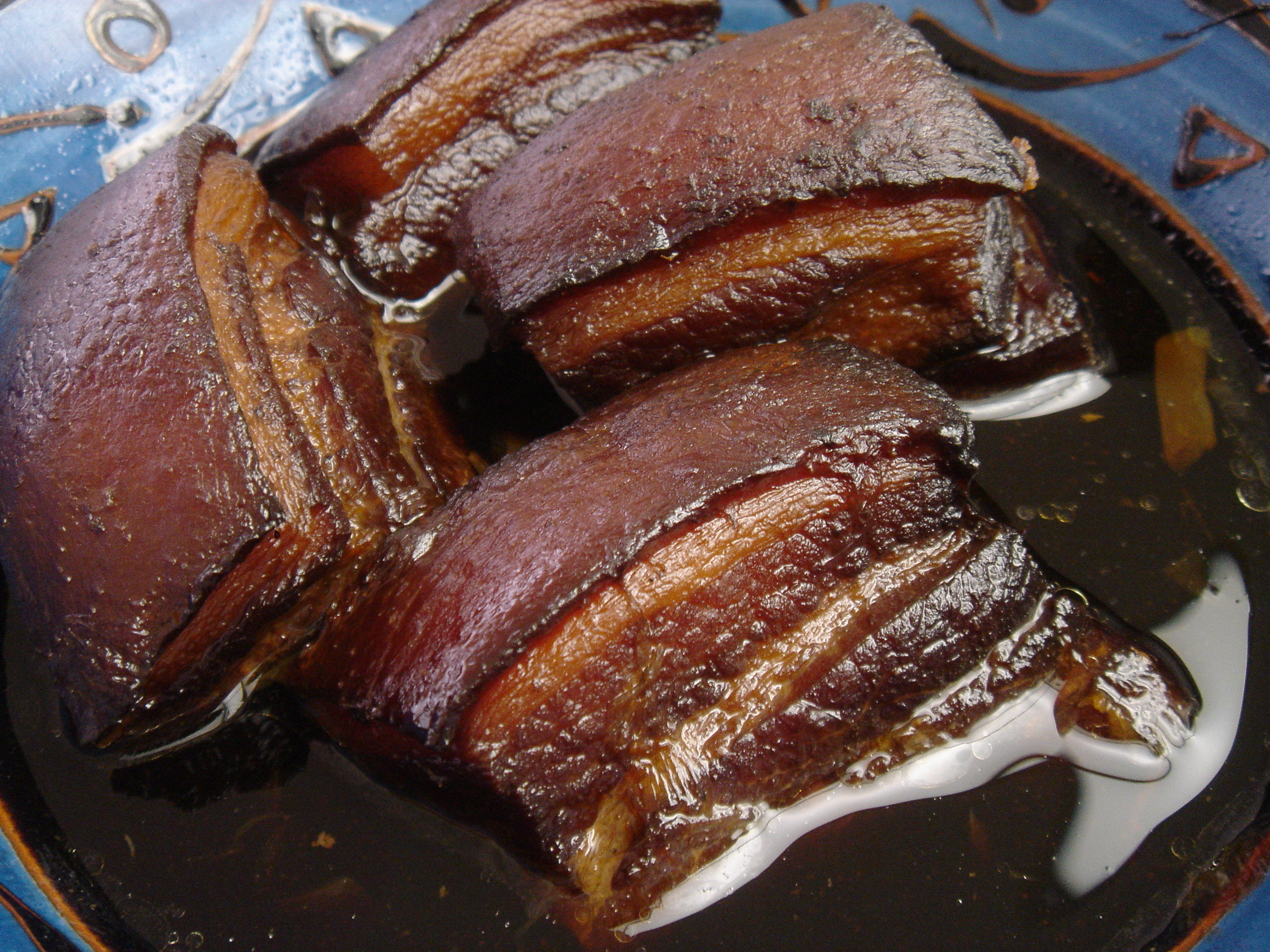
Dongpo pork, a notable dish in Zhejiang cuisine

=== Zhejiang ===
Zhejiang cuisine (浙菜; Zhècài or 浙江菜; zhèjiāngcài) derives from the native cooking styles of the Zhejiang region. The dishes are not greasy, having instead a fresh, soft flavor with a mellow fragrance.

The cuisine consists of at least four styles, each of which originated from different cities in the province:

- Hangzhou style, characterized by rich variations and the use of bamboo shoots
- Shaoxing style, specializing in poultry and freshwater fish
- Ningbo style, specializing in seafood
- Shanghai style, a combination of different Zhe styles, is also very famous for its dim sum

== Other ==
Other regions and ethnic groups with unique dishes and styles are represented in China, including Macau, Taiwan, and many more.

=== Northeastern (Dongbei) ===
Many dishes in this region originated in Manchu cuisine, but it is also heavily influenced by the cuisines of Russia, Beijing, Mongolia, and Shandong. It partially relies on preserved foods and large portions due to the region's harsh winters and relatively short growing seasons.

=== Gansu ===
Gansu cuisine is the regional cooking style of the Han Chinese, deeply influenced by the local Hui people in the Gansu province of Northwestern China.

=== Hainan ===
Hainan cuisine is derived from the cooking styles of the peoples of Hainan Province in China. The food is lighter, less oily, and more mildly seasoned than that of continental China. Seafood predominates the menu, as prawn, crab, and freshwater and ocean fish are widely available.

=== Hakka ===
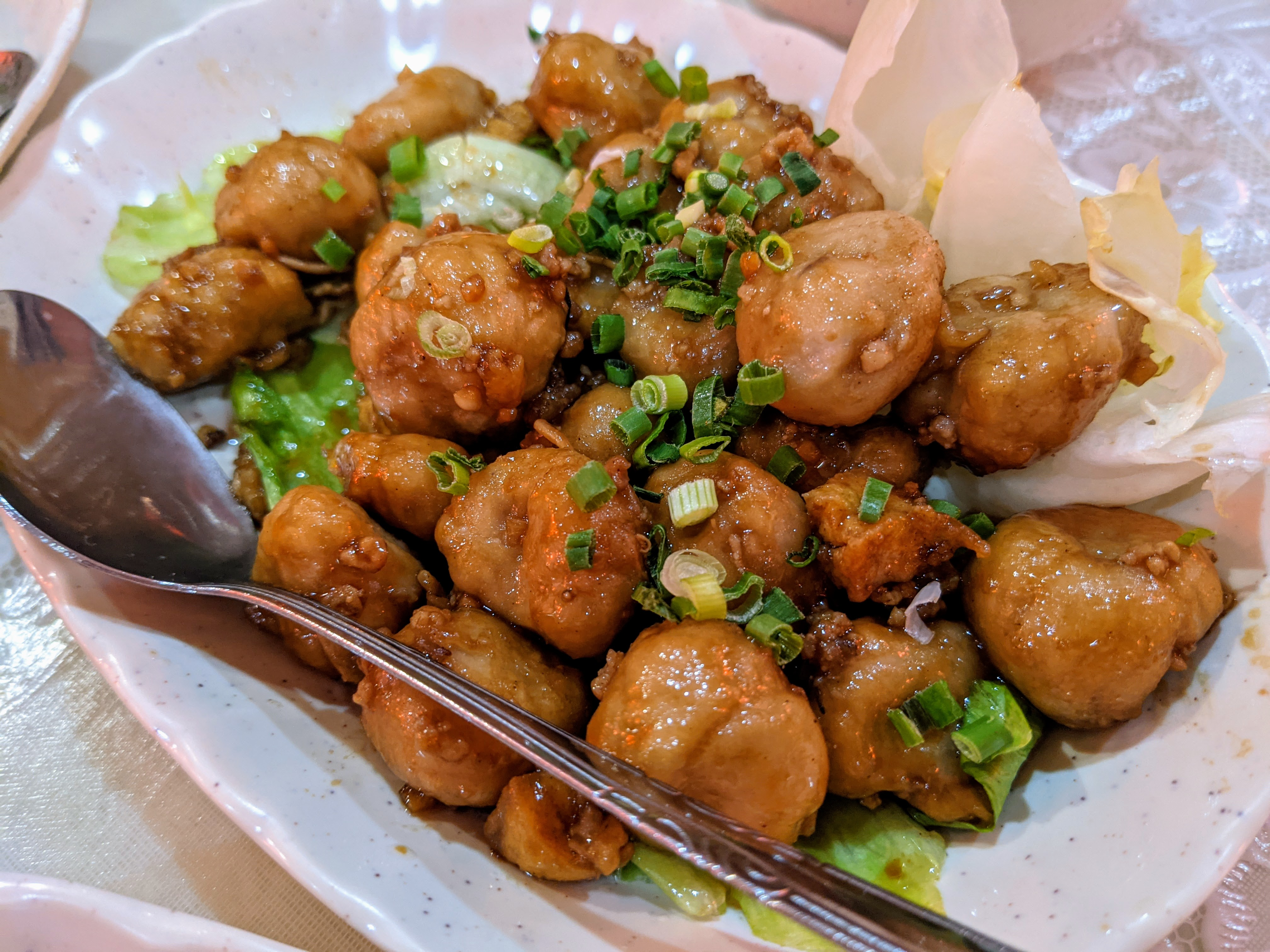
Hakka abacus beads (算盘子), made from yam and tapioca

Hakka cuisine is the cooking style of the Hakka people, and it may also be found in parts of Taiwan and in countries with significant overseas Hakka communities. It emphasizes the texture of food, and features preserved meats and vegetables.

=== Jilin ===
Jilin cuisine is the regional cooking style of the Han Chinese with heavy influence from native Manchu, Korean, and Mongolian minorities in the Jilin Province of Northeastern China.

=== Mongolian ===
Mongolian hotpot is very famous in China, and popular with the Han ethnic group.

=== Qinghai ===
Qinghai cuisine is the regional cooking style of the Han Chinese with distinct influence from the Hui, Monguor people, and Tibetans in the Qinghai province in Northwest China.

=== Tibetan ===
Tibetan cuisine is traditionally served with bamboo chopsticks, in contrast to other Himalayan cuisines, which are eaten by hand. Small soup bowls are used, and the wealthier Tibetans ate from bowls of gold and silver.

=== Xinjiang ===
The cuisine of Xinjiang reflects the region's many ethnic groups, and refers particularly to Uyghur cuisine. Signature ingredients include roasted mutton, kebabs, roasted fish and rice. Because of the distinctive Muslim population, the food is predominantly halal.

=== Yunnan ===
Yunnan only began to come under significant Chinese influence some 1000 years after Sichuan was annexed. As the most geographically, ethnically and culturally diverse province in modern China, it naturally features a wide variety of cuisine.
