= Dazhu gansi =

Chinese tofu dish

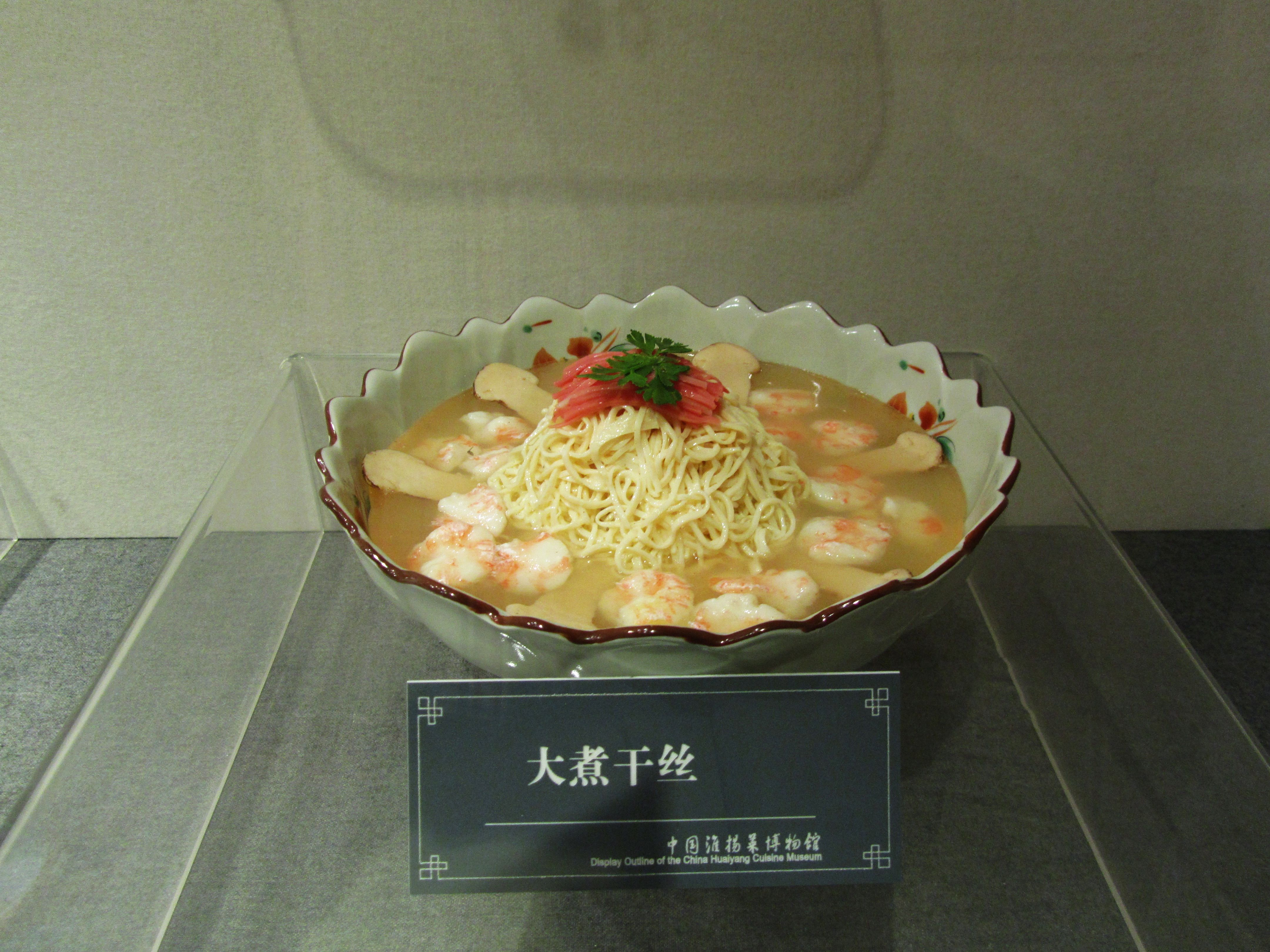
- Place of origin: China
- Region or state: Yangzhou
- Main ingredients: shredded dried tofu, chicken broth
- Ingredients generally used: shrimp, chicken meat, mushrooms, bamboo shoots, ham

Dazhu gansi (simplified Chinese: 大煮干丝; traditional Chinese: 大煮乾絲; pinyin: dàzhǔ gānsī) is a specialty dish of Huaiyang cuisine. Dried tofu is sliced into matchstick-sized pieces and served in chicken stock. Many other ingredients can be added to the tofu. As tofu does not have much flavor, the chef is challenged to produce knifework of great precision (a hallmark of Huaiyang cuisine) and a broth of the highest quality. It is said to have been created in Yangzhou for the Qianlong emperor.
