= Recipes from the Garden of Contentment =

Chinese cookbook

Recipes from the Garden of Contentment (Chinese: 隨園食單; pinyin: Suíyuán Shídān) is a work on cooking and gastronomy written by Yuan Mei. It is known in English under various titles, including Food Lists of the Garden of Contentment, Menus from the Garden of Contentment, Recipes from Sui Garden and The Way of Eating. It was originally published in 1792 and contains instructions and critiques on Chinese cuisine as well as a large number of recipes of dishes from the period. It was updated by Xia Chuanzheng in the late 19th century, and not translated into English in complete form until 2018.

== Content ==
The work reflects Yuan's "orthodox" literati stance on Chinese cuisine, which derided the opulent displays and dishes in banquets of his time. Yuan also resented what he regarded as the corruption of Chinese food by Manchu cooks. The work contains a preface, two chapters on gastronomy, and 12 chapters on recipes using various ingredients:

1. "Preface" (序)
2. "Essential Knowledge" (須知單): 20 sections
3. "Things to Avoid" (戒單): 14 sections
4. "Seafood" (海鮮單): 9 sections
5. "River Delicacies" (江鮮單): 9 sections
6. "Sacrificial Animal" [pork] (特牲單): 43 sections
7. "Various Animals"' (雜牲單): 16 sections
8. "Poultry" (羽族單): 56 sections
9. "Scaled Fish" (水族有鱗單): 17 sections
10. "Scaleless Fish" (水族無鱗單): 28 sections
11. "Various Vegetable Dishes" (雜素菜單): 47 sections
12. "Small Dishes" (小菜單): 41 sections
13. "Appetizers and Dim Sum" (點心單): 55 sections
14. "Rice and Congee" (飯粥單): 2 sections
15. "Tea and Wine" (茶酒單): 16 sections

== Foods and theory ==
A wide variety of foods and recipes are presented in the Recipes from the Garden of Contentment that show the gustatory preferences of Yuan Mei and people during the mid-18th century. For instance, a particular recipe to imitate roe-filled mitten crabs, shows that the demand and intense fondness for crab and crab-roe in Chinese cuisine goes back several centuries, and that people have also actively attempted to find a substitute for it when it is unavailable:

Imitation Crab: Boil two yellow croaker and remove their bones. Add to the fish four raw salted eggs. Break the eggs up without mixing them into the fish, and fry everything quickly with oil. To the mixture add chicken broth, let boil, and then stir in the salted egg until the mixture is even. Finish the dish with shiitake, green onions, ginger juice, and wine. Serve with liberal amounts of vinegar.

— Yuan Mei, Recipes from the Garden of Contentment (1792), "River Delicacies"

== Annotated manuscript ==
More than half a century after the publication of the Recipes from the Garden of Contentment, Xia Chuanzheng (夏傳曾, 1843–1883) annotated and expanded the contents of the original work and published it as the Recipes from the Garden of Contentment, Extended and Rectified (隨園食單 補證; Suiyuan Shidan Buzheng). The modified work contains two additional chapters:

- "Sweeteners and colourants" (糖色單)
- "Condiments" (作料單)

The original text was also thoroughly annotated with reference to Chinese historical and philosophical works, and listed therapeutic effects of the food based on traditional Chinese medicine. Correction to errors in Recipes from the Garden of Contentment were also provided by Xia along with sometimes humorous anecdotes about the foods.

== Bilingual translation ==
A bilingual Chinese and English version was published in 2018 as Recipes from the Garden of Contentment, translated by Sean J. S. Chen. It is 428 pages in this hardback edition, with extensive annotations, illustrations, and a glossary. In 2019, it was republished in trade-paperback form as The Way of Eating. The book was developed from the author's online translation project, Way of the Eating, developed from 2013 through 2017.
