= Huaiyang cuisine =

Branch of Chinese traditional cuisine native to Jiangsu province

- Traditional Chinese: 淮揚菜
- Simplified Chinese: 淮扬菜
- Literal meaning: Cuisine of Huai['an] and Yang[zhou]
Transcriptions
Standard Mandarin
- Hanyu Pinyin: Huáiyáng cài
- Wade–Giles: Huai-yang Tsai

Jianghuai cuisine
- Chinese: 江淮菜
- Literal meaning: Cuisine of [the Land between] the Yangtze and the Huai
Transcriptions
Standard Mandarin
- Hanyu Pinyin: Jiānghuái cài
- Wade–Giles: Chiang-huai Tsai

Huaiyang or Jianghuai cuisine is one of the Four Great Traditions in Chinese cuisine. It is derived from the native cooking styles of the region surrounding the lower reaches of the Huai and Yangtze rivers and centered on the cities of Huai'an, Yangzhou and Zhenjiang in Jiangsu Province. Although it is one of several sub-regional styles within Jiangsu cuisine, Huaiyang cuisine is widely seen in Chinese culinary circles as the most popular and prestigious style of Jiangsu cuisine, to a point where it is considered to be one of the Four Great Traditions (四大菜系; Sì dà càixì) that dominate the culinary heritage of China, along with Cantonese cuisine, Shandong cuisine, and Sichuan cuisine.

== History and current status ==
Huaiyang cuisine, originating from regions around Huaihe River and Yangtze River, mainly Huai'an and Yangzhou, has been famous since the Sui (581–618) and Tang (618–907) dynasties. Emperors Kangxi (1654–1722) and Qianlong (1711–1799) often stayed in Huai'an and Yangzhou during their travels to the southern regions of the Yangtze River down the Grand Canal, making the cuisine popular in the nation. It has been listed as one of the four major cuisines in China since the reign of Emperor Qianlong.

== Typical features ==
Huaiyang cuisine is characterized by basing each dish on its main ingredient; the way that ingredient is cut is pivotal to its cooking and its final taste. The cuisine is also known for its use of Chinkiang vinegar, which is produced in the Jiangsu region. Huaiyang cuisine tends to have a slightly sweet side to it and is almost never spicy, in contrast to some Chinese cuisines (like Sichuan or Hunan). Pork, chicken, and freshwater aquatic products serve as the protein base in most dishes, which are usually lighter and more meticulously prepared.

== Notable dishes ==
| English | Image | Traditional Chinese | Simplified Chinese | Pinyin | Notes |
|---|---|---|---|---|---|
| Dazhu gansi | | 大煮乾絲 | 大煮干丝 | dàzhǔ gānsī | Braised shredded chicken with ham and dried tofu |
| Jade shaomai | | 翡翠燒賣 | 翡翠烧卖 | fěicùi shāomài | |
| Lion's head | | 獅子頭 | 狮子头 | shīzi tóu | Braised pork meatballs in brown sauce |
| Noodles with shrimp and pork dumplings | | 蝦子餃麪 | 虾籽饺面 | xīazi jǐaomiàn | |
| Pot stickers | | 鮮肉鍋貼 | 鲜肉锅贴 | xiānròu gūotīe | |
| Yangzhou fried rice | | 揚州炒飯 | 扬州炒饭 | Yángzhōu chǎofàn | |

Others include Yangzhou pickles, baozi, ginkgo, Qionghuayu liquor, Nanshan green tea, baoying lotus root starch, and Jiangdu short pastry.

Baozi is a type of steamed bun with meat, paste fillings, a sweet filling made with red beans. The "five diced buns" made of chicken, pork, bamboo shoots, shrimp, and sea cucumbers are Yangzhou specialties. It is sometimes served for breakfast and is best eaten hot.

There is also a dish called "beggar's chicken" (叫花雞; jiàohuā jī), which is a whole chicken marinated with spices and wrapped in aluminum foil. Contrary to its name, it is not a food for the homeless, but was traditionally wrapped in leaves or sometimes even covered in clay to allow the full flavour of the chicken to be preserved.

There is a famous branch of Huaiyang cuisine, Suxi cuisine, which refers to dishes from Suzhou and Wuxi. Wuxi sauced spare ribs, with a long history since the Qing dynasty, is a specialty in Wuxi, along with Liangxi crispy fried eel and other dishes. Another dish from the area is squirrel fish, a dish prepared in the shape of a squirrel.

Unusual dishes local to Nanjing are duck blood and vermicelli soup and stinky tofu.

== Use in official dining ==
Huaiyang cuisine has been employed in official occasions by the Chinese government. Some examples include:

- In 1949, for the first state banquet of the People's Republic of China.
- In 1999, for China's 50th anniversary state banquet.
- In 2002, for visiting U.S. President George W. Bush, hosted by Chinese President and General Secretary of the Chinese Communist Party Jiang Zemin.
- In 2026, for visiting U.S. President Donald Trump, hosted by Chinese President and General Secretary of the Chinese Communist Party Xi Jinping.

== See also ==
- List of Chinese dishes
- Din Tai Fung
- Chinese regional cuisine
- Chinese imperial cuisine
