= Wuhe =

Wuhe may refer to these places in China:

- Wuhe County (五河县), in Bengbu, Anhui

== Towns ==
- Wuhe, Anqing (五河), in Yuexi County, Anhui
- Wuhe, Baiyin (五合), in Jingyuan County, Gansu
- Wuhe, Wuwei, Gansu (五和), in Wuwei, Gansu
- Wuhe, Guangdong (五和), in Guangning County, Guangdong

== Townships ==
- Wuhe Township, Henan (吴河乡), in Shangcheng County, Henan
- Wuhe Township, Sichuan (五合乡), in Jianyang, Sichuan
- Wuhe Township, Yunnan (五合乡), in Tengchong, Yunnan
