= Wang Danyi =

Revolutionary activist and policy researcher (1919–2016)

- 王丹一
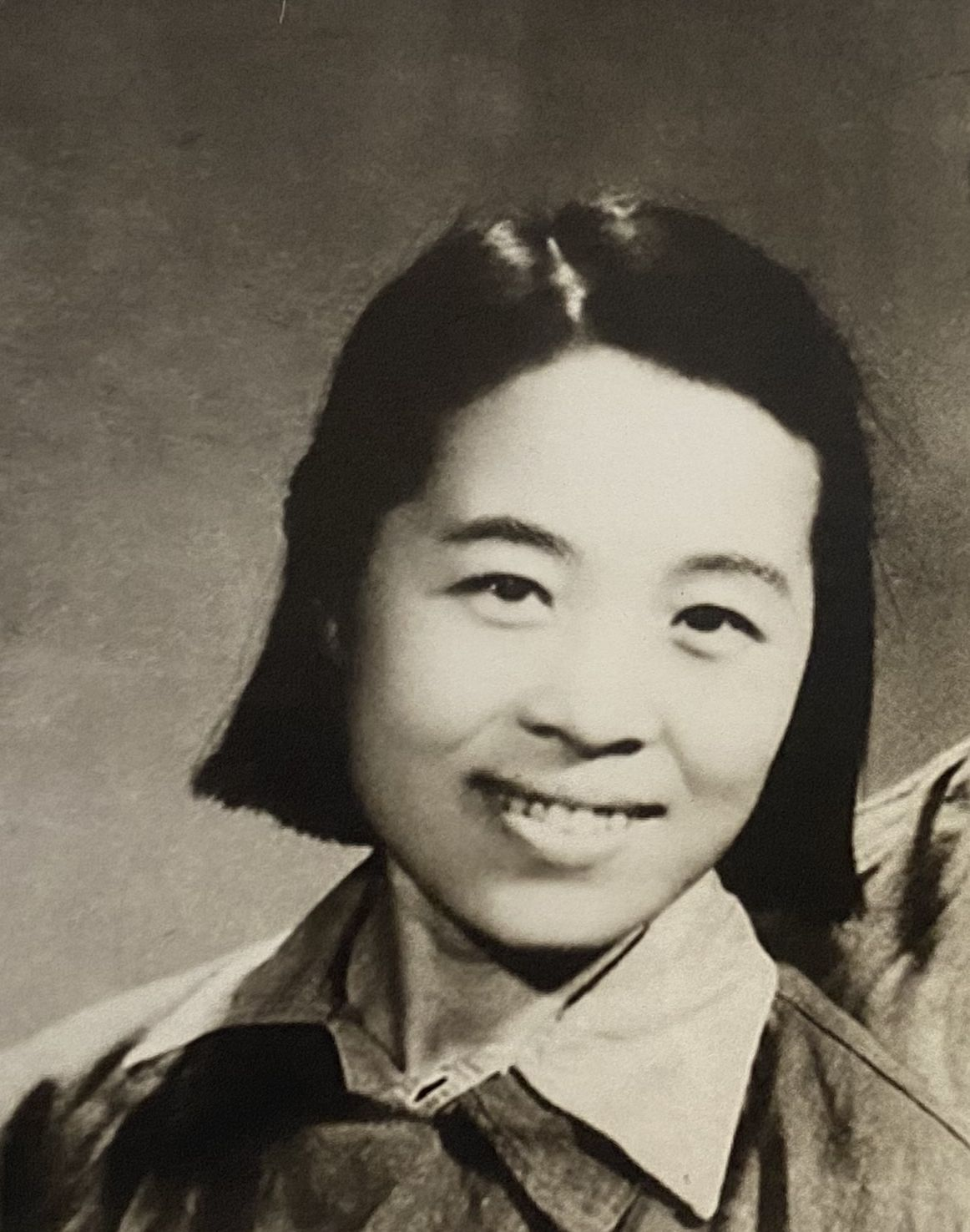
- Born: 王珠鳳; 1919; Jintan, Changzhou
- Died: July 19, 2016
- Burial place: Tengchong, Yunnan
- Occupation: Policy researcher
- Spouse: Ai Siqi

Wang Danyi (Chinese: 王丹一; pinyin: Wáng Dānyī; 1919 – 19 July 2016), born Wang Zhufeng (王珠鳳), was a revolutionary activist and a member of the Chinese Communist Party who served in the policy research institutes of the Organization Department of the Chinese Communist Party and the Central Party School.

After the end of the Cultural Revolution, she organised the draft manuscripts left by her husband Ai Siqi before he died, and published two volumes of Ai Siqi Collected Works and eight volumes of The Complete Book of Ai Siqi among others.

== Life ==
Wang Danyi was born in Jintan, Changzhou in 1919. From a young age she was influenced by her family education. When Wang was twelve, she accompanied her father to learn more about the Chinese civilisation, which they believed was under threat of Japanese invasion. In September 1932, Wang was admitted into the Shanxi Experimental Secondary School, and participated in "Red Women's Federations"s efforts to fight against Japan. In September 1935, Wang enrolled in Beijing No. 35 High School and participated in the December 9th Movement organised by the Chinese Communist Party. In July 1937, Wang transferred to Wuhan No.2 High School and participated in the anti-Japanese activities organised by the Pingjin Refugee Students Association. In November, Wang went to Yan'an to continue her revolutionary activities.

Wang Danyi learned guerrilla warfare from the guerrilla warfare classes offered by the Xi'an Corps of the Chinese National Liberation Vanguard and later transferred to the Anwubao Wartime Youth Training Class in Anwu, Jingyang County. In April 1938, Wang enrolled in the 14th team of the second phase at the main campus of Shaanbei Public School for study and officially joined the Chinese Communist Party. In July, Wang participated in establishing branches of the Shaanbei Public School in Kanhuagong Village (看花宫村) in Xunyi County, successively serving as the Political Affairs Officer and Squad Leader of the 37th Squad. In May 1939, Wang returned to Yan'an and studied in the Propaganda Research Office of the Yan'an College of Marxism and Leninism (later renamed the Central Research Institute of the Chinese Communist Party). In January 1942, Wang Danyi was transferred to the Publicity and Education Bureau of the Publicity Department of the Chinese Communist Party, and later participated in the Yan'an Rectification Movement in the following year. In July 1944, Wang married Ai Siqi. Later, Wang Danyi worked in the Literature and Art Office of the Third Department of the Central Party School, the Jiefang Daily, the Central Land Reform Movement, the First Department of North China University, and the First Department of the Yan'an College of Marxism and Leninism.

After the establishment of the People's Republic of China, Wang Danyi worked for a long time in the Organization Department of the Central Committee of the Chinese Communist Party, serving successively as an organizer and inspector in the Organization and Guidance Division, the Party Member Management Division, and the Grassroots Division. In September 1963, Wang was transferred to the Policy Research Office of the Central Party School and served as a member of the Party branch committee. In 1966, after Ai Siqi's death, Wang was entrusted by Deng Yingchao, Li Peizhi, and others to organised his posthumous manuscripts. During the Cultural Revolution, Wang was targetted and sent to work in the May Seventh Cadre School in Henan. In 1973, Wang returned to Beijing to recover from illness. In 1978, after the reopening of the Central Party School, Wang Danyi officially began organising Ai Siqi's manuscripts. In November 1982, Wang retired.

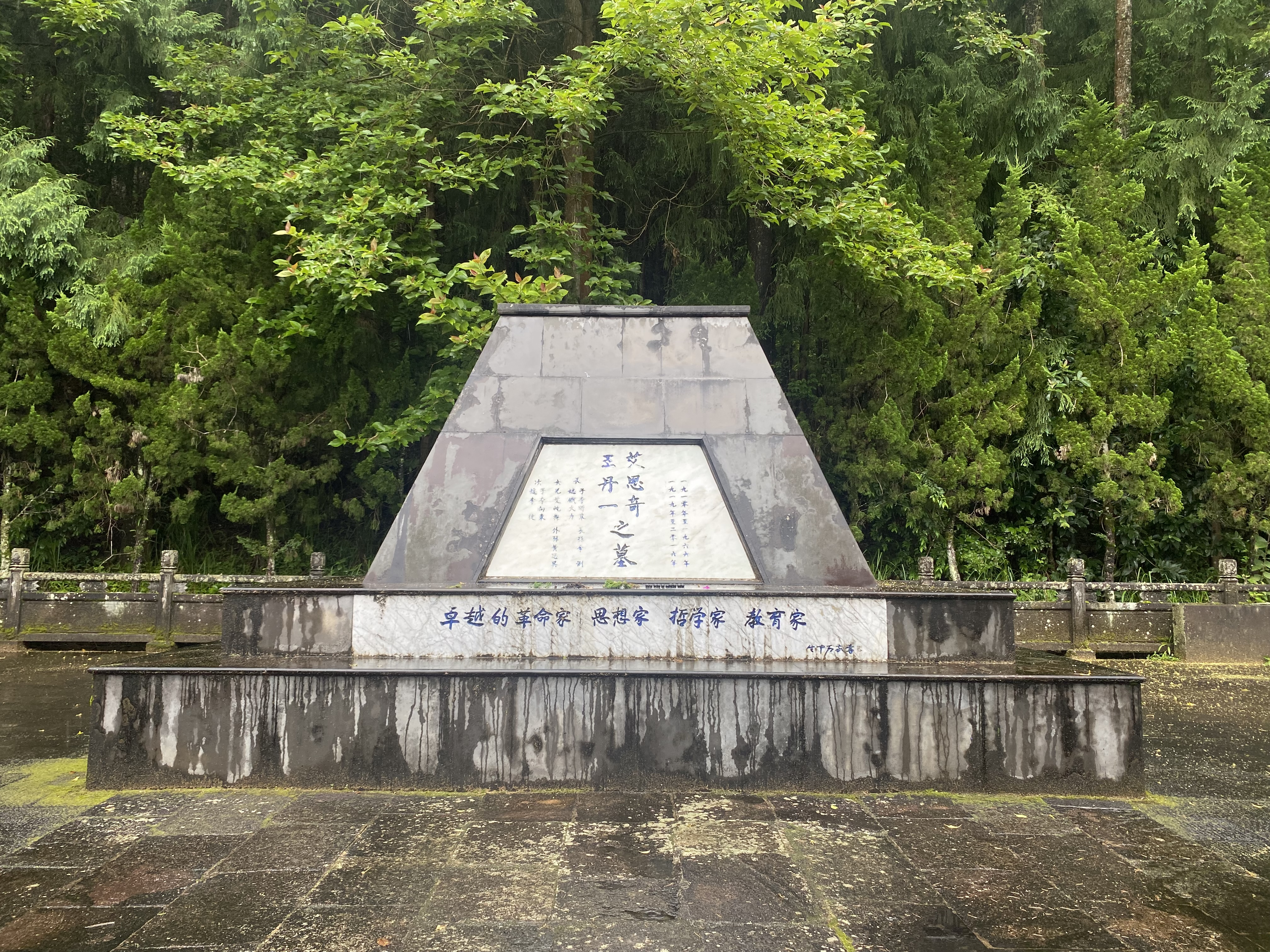
The grave of Ai Siqi and Wang Danyi

On 19 July, 2016, Wang Danyi died in Beijing at 97 years old. She was buried with her husband in his hometown in Tengchong, Yunnan. Wang was officially recognised as an "Outstanding Member of the Chinese Communist Party", and her obituary emphasised that she was a "retired cadre at the deputy bureau level of the Policy Research Office of the Central Party School (enjoying vice-ministerial level medical treatment)". At the memorial service, several then-senior Chinese Communist Party leaders, as well as former Premiers Li Peng, Zhu Rongji, Wen Jiabao and retired elders such as Song Ping sent wreaths.

== Notable work ==
In 1953, because of a surgical accident, Wang Danyi suffered from nerve damage, and later suffered from multiple illnesses. However, she continued her work, and successively published two volumes of Ai Siqi Collected Works and eight volumes of The Complete Book of Ai Siqi among others. After retirement, Wang continued to organise and research Ai Siqi's academic thought until she died.
