= Yang Yuewu =

Chinese martial artist

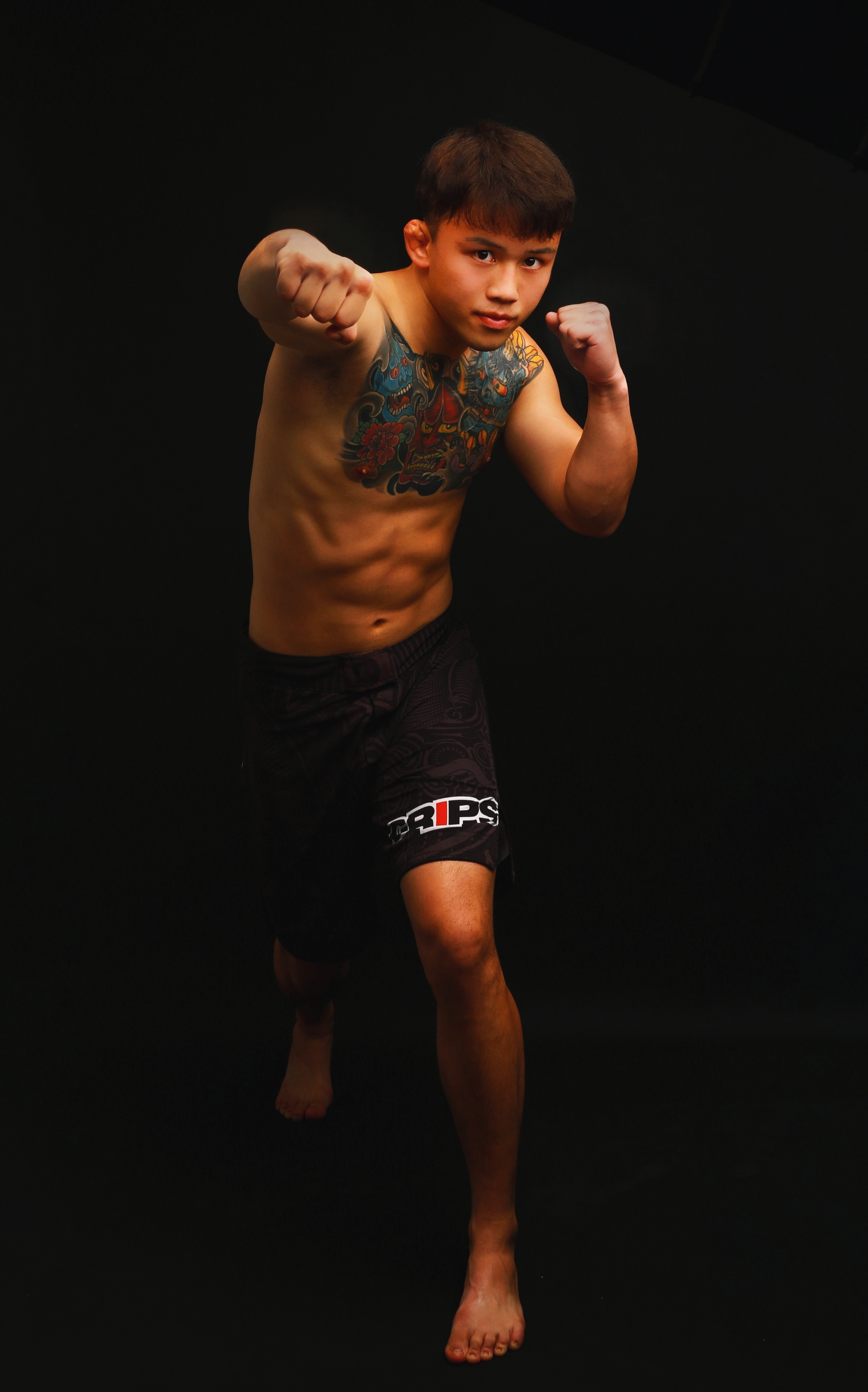
- Born: Yang Yuewu; April 12, 1998 (age 28); Sichuan, China
- Native name: 杨玥武
- Nationality: Chinese
- Height: 170 cm (5 ft 7 in)
- Weight: 61–66 kg (134–146 lb; 9 st 8 lb – 10 st 6 lb)Early career at bantamweight; competed at 66 kg in 2025
- Division: Bantamweight, Featherweight
- Style: Mixed martial arts
- Years active: 2017–2018, 2025

Yang Yuewu (Chinese: 杨玥武, born 12 April 1998) is a Chinese mixed martial artist from Sichuan.

== Career ==
Yang began training in Chinese martial arts during his teens. Public fight records list a professional slate of 2–1 between 2017 and 2018. He made his professional debut in July 2017 at the Alxa Chinese-Foreign Invitational, winning by first-round armbar. On 19 February 2018, at The King Fighting Championship event in Tengchong, he earned a decision victory over Nuerlanni Baiken.

In March 2018, he lost by first-round Technical knockoutechnical knockout via ground-and-pound at a Chin Woo Men event. At the amateur level, results documented in 2017 and 2018 include two wins and one loss at Rebel FC/Ning Guangyou trials.

On January 10, 2025, in the 66 kg final of the International All-style Mixed Martial Arts Federation (AIAMM) World Championships held at Rajadamnern Stadium, Yang secured a rear naked choke submission to defeat Yothin FA Group and become world champion.
