= Streptomyces calidiresistens =

Scientific classification
- Domain: Bacteria
- Kingdom: Bacillati
- Phylum: Actinomycetota
- Class: Actinomycetia
- Order: Streptomycetales
- Family: Streptomycetaceae
- Genus: Streptomyces
- Species: S. calidiresistens

Binomial name
- Streptomyces calidiresistens Duan et al. 2014

Type strain
- BCRC 16955, DSM 42108, JCM 19629, YIM 78087

Species of bacterium

Streptomyces calidiresistens is a bacterium species from the genus of Streptomyces which has been isolated from hot spring sediment from the Hehua hot spring in Tengchong in China.

== See also ==
- List of Streptomyces species
