= Gwangnyeong Muk clan =

Korean clan from Guangdong, China

- Country: Korea
- Current region: Guangning County
- Founder: Muk Sa

Gwangnyeong Muk clan (Korean: 광녕 묵씨; Hanja: 廣寧 墨氏) was one of the Korean clans. Their Bon-gwan was in Guangning County, China. According to the research in 2000, the number of Gwangnyeong Muk clan was 133. Muk clan was born in Liang County (Hanja: 梁郡), China. Gwangnyeong Muk clan’s founder was Muk Sa. He was a descendant of Mozi who was from Yang Province in China, and was a thinker from Lu in China’s Spring and Autumn period. He was naturalized in Joseon when he was a minister of defense (Hanja: 兵部尚書, Bingbu Shangshu) in Ming dynasty.

== See also ==
- Korean clan names of foreign origin
