= Yuexi County =

Yuexi County may refer to:

County-level divisions in China

- Yuexi County, Anhui (岳西县), county of Anqing City, Anhui
- Yuexi County, Sichuan (越西县), county of Liangshan Yi Autonomous Prefecture, Sichuan

Township-level divisions in China

- Yuexi, Dongkou (月溪乡), a township of Dongkou County, Hunan
