= Anhui Yuexi High School =

School in Anhui, China

Anhui Yuexi High School 安徽省岳西中学

Location
- Yuexi County, Anhui; China

Information
- Established: 1943
- Website: Official website at the Wayback Machine (archived January 12, 2016)

Anhui Yuexi High School (simplified Chinese: 安徽省岳西中学; traditional Chinese: 安徽省岳西中學) is a high school in Yuexi County. Founded in 1943, it is in the southwest of Anhui province of China.

== History ==
Founded in spring 1943, Yuexi County Junior Middle School (Chinese: 岳西县立初级中学) was in Yaqian, Gaowan (Chinese: 衙前高湾). The school relocated to Tangchifan (Chinese: 汤池畈) in the winter of that year. Over 250 students attended the school, which had five classes. The school changed its name in 1947 to Yuexi Public School (Chinese: 岳西公学). It became the Yuexi County Private Joint Middle School (Chinese: 岳西县私立联合中学) in September 1949 after it gained control of the school properties of Nanyue (Chinese: 南岳), Huazheng (Chinese: 华正), and Silu (Chinese: 司麓).

The school initially was at Jinjia Ancestrall Hall (Chinese: 金家祠堂) and later relocated to its current location in 1953. It changed its name to Anhui Yuexi High School (Chinese: 安徽省岳西中學) in 1958 after it expanded to include high school grades. This made the school the county's inaugural complete secondary school following the founding of the People's Republic of China in 1949.

The school has been the subject of academic study on its design and architecture.
