= Ai Siqi =

Chinese philosopher and author (1910–1966)

- 艾思奇
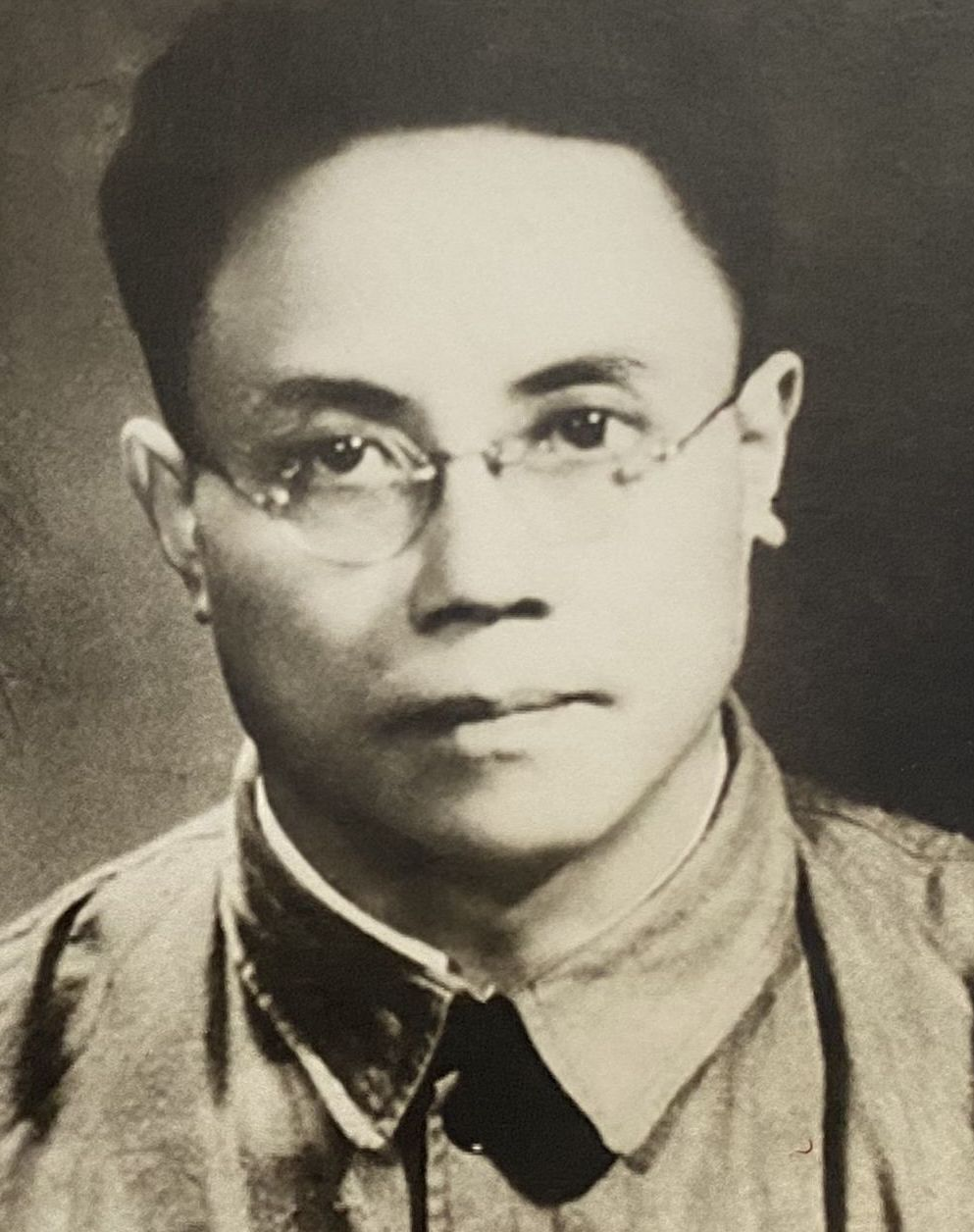
- Born: 李生萱; March 2, 1910
- Died: March 22, 1966 (aged 56)
- Burial place: Tengchong, Yunnan
- Occupation: Philosopher
- Spouse: Wang Danyi

Li Shengxuan (Chinese: 李生萱; 2 March 1910 – 22 March 1966), better known by his pen name Ai Siqi (Chinese: 艾思奇; pinyin: Ài Sīqí), was a Chinese Marxist philosopher and author of Mongolian descent. (Some sources claim he was of Persian descent.) After the establishment of the People's Republic of China, he served as Deputy Minister of the Yunnan Provincial Military and Political Department and Director of the Department of Justice.

== Life ==
Ai Siqi was born on March 2, 1910, in Henshun, Tengchong, Yunnan. His grandfather, Li Derun, was a merchant from western Yunnan. His father, Li Yuegai, graduated from the Department of Economics at Peking University and was a member of the South Society and Tongmenghui. His uncle was Li Genyuan, a veteran of the Kuomintang.

Ai Siqi started attending private school at the age of 7. Ai was educated in Hong Kong. In 1923, due to Tang Jiyao, Ai's family moved to Hong Kong and he transferred to a high school affiliated with Lingnan University. In 1925, after returning to Yunnan, he was admitted to Provincial Kunming No. 1 Middle School. He soon organized a reading club in school, which started his interest in Marxism. He met individuals such as Nie Er and Li Guozho and published articles against Tang Jiyao in Yunnan Tide. In the winter of 1926, the military and police started a manhunt for Ai, leading him to flee to Suzhou to seek refuge with his father. When the Northern Expedition became increasingly fierce and the political situation turned unstable, Ai's father decided to send him to study in Japan, where he studied briefly for a year in 1927 and lived with Zhang Tianfan and others from Yunnan. In Tokyo, Ai met Tong Changrong, Wang Buwen and others from the Tokyo branch of the Chinese Communist Party. In May 1928, he returned to Kunming because of stomach problems.

In 1930, Ai returned to Japan and was admitted to the Department of Metallurgy of Fukuoka Industrial High School. However, after the Mukden incident in 1931, he gave up his studies and returned to Kunming. In the spring of 1932, he left home and went to Shanghai to live with his fifth uncle, Li Yueji, hoping that his uncle could support him to study in Germany. However, Yueji criticized Ai's abandonment of school and did not agree. Later, he was introduced by a classmate to teach at Shanghai Quanzhang Middle School. In 1933, Quanzhang Middle School was closed down, but he continued to work for the school. Later, he was introduced to the Chinese Social Scientists Association by Du Guoxiang. Ai began to host the magazine Reading Life and work for the Shenbao library, working with Li Gongpu, Xia Zhengnong, Gao Shiqi, and Liu Xi. This gave him the opportunity to write Popular Philosophy.

In October 1935, introduced by Zhou Yang and Zhou Libo, Ai joined the Chinese Communist Party. During the 1930s, Ai wrote extensively on Marxist concepts, particularly dialectical materialism.

In November 1936, after the Seven Gentlemen Incident (in which seven intellectuals in Shanghai were arrested), Li Gongpu was arrested and the Reading Life magazine was also shut down. In May 1936, Ai founded the monthly journal Knowledge. After the Marco Polo Bridge Incident, he edited the five-day Frontline and the weekly Anti-Enemy, edited by Hu Yuzhi and Zou Taofen. In October, he went to Yan'an, where he oversaw the work of the Yan'an Philosophical Association and the Border Region Literary Association. He also taught at the Anti-Japanese Military and Political University and the Shaanxi-Gansu-Ningxia Public School, collaborating with He Sijing, Ren Baige, and Xu Maoyang. On May 5, 1938, after the Yan'an Marxist–Leninist Academy was established, he became a faculty member. In September 1938, Ai founded the New Philosophical Society. After the Luochuan Conference, he also served as Propaganda Minister for the Anti-Japanese Support Association.

In 1940, he co-hosted the magazine Chinese Culture. In July 1941, after the establishment of the Academia Sinica, he became Director of the Cultural and Ideological Research Office and Dean of the Socialist College of the merged Yan'an University.

In an April 1943 Liberation Daily article, Ai called for a "new labor perspective," emphasizing the importance of labor as a means through which the masses became masters of their own fate in the New Democratic society.

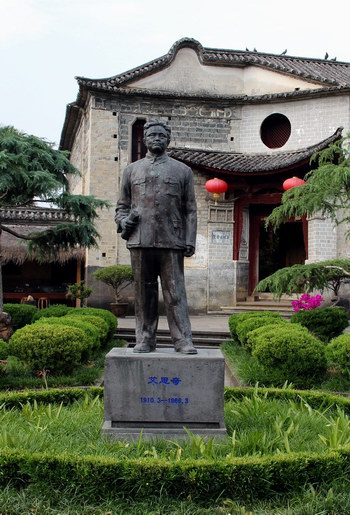
Statue of Aisiqi in courtyard of his house in Heshun

In the small tourist town of Heshun, Tengchong County, Yunnan, China, there is a small museum dedicated to Ai. It is based in his former house, where he lived for two years. It contains pictures, personal items and a statue of him in the yard of the compound.

== Secondary literature ==
- Joshua A. Fogel, "Ai Siqi, Establishment Intellectual", in Merle Goldman, Timothy Cheek, and Carol Lee Hamrin, eds., China's Intellectuals and the State: In Search of a New Relationship (Harvard University Asia Center, 1987).
- Joshua A. Fogel. Ai Ssu-ch'i's Contribution to the Development of Chinese Marxism. (Cambridge, Mass.: Council on East Asian Studies/Harvard UniversityHarvard Contemporary China Series, 1987). ISBN 0674012607.
- Nick Knight, "The Role of Philosopher to The Chinese Communist Movement: Ai Siqi, Mao Zedong and Marxist Philosophy in China," Asian Studies Review Volume 26, Issue 4, pages 419–445, December 2002
- Chenshan Tian (2002). Ai Siqi's Reading of the Marxian Notion of "Existence Versus Consciousness". Journal of Chinese Philosophy 29 (3):437–456
- Китайская философия. Энциклопедический словарь. М., 1994 — С.12-13. ISBN 5-244-00757-2
