= Heshun Town =

Heshun 和顺
- Town
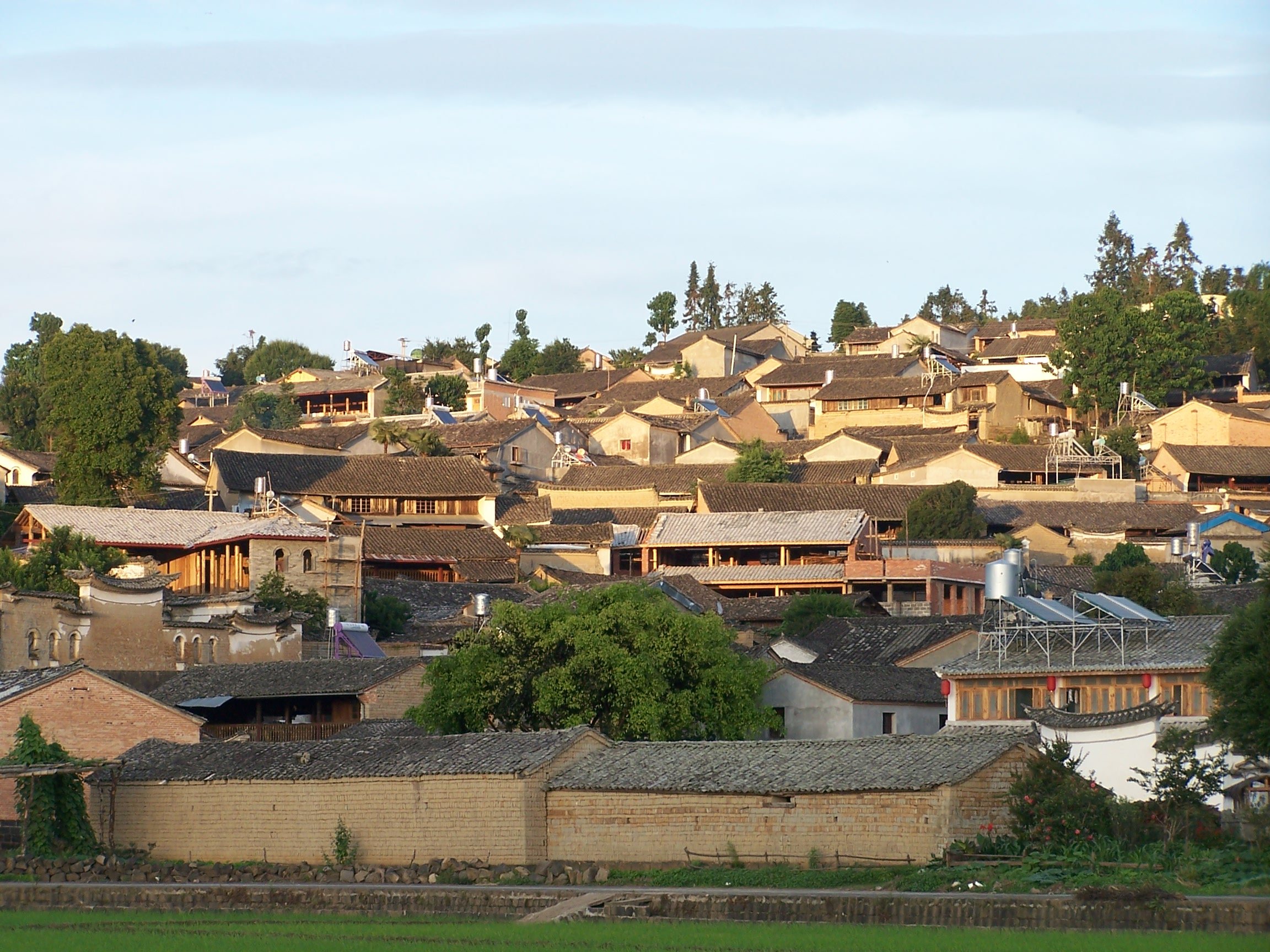

- Location in Yunnan Heshun (China)
- Coordinates: 25°00′41″N 98°27′25″E
- Country: China
- Province: Yunnan
- Prefecture: Baoshan
- County: Tengchong
- Elevation: 1,580 m (5,180 ft)

Population (2010)
  - Total: 6,560
- Time zone: UTC+8 (China Standard)

Heshun Town (Chinese: 和顺镇; pinyin: Héshùn Zhèn) is an ancient town in Tengchong City, located four kilometers southwest of the city centre in Yunnan, China. The town's ancient name is Yangwendun (阳温墩; Yángwēndūn) which was changed to Heshun (河顺; Héshùn) and eventually the name it bears today. Heshun is well known for its quadrangle courtyards that have been built into the town's hills.

== Attractions ==
- Xianhe (陷河; xianhe) is a wetland that has the characteristics of biodiversity.
- The memorial of Ai Siqi
- The group of ancient trees of Thousand-Hand Kwan-yin (千手观音古树群; qianshouguanyingushuqun)
- Laundry booth (洗衣亭; xiyiting)
- The bridge of double rainbow (双虹桥; shuanghongqiao)
- The pool of dragon (龙潭; longtan)
- Zhongtiansi (中天寺; zhongtiansi)
- Kuige (魁阁; kuige)
- The library of Heshun (和顺图书馆; heshuntushuguan)
