= Shangcheng County =

Shangcheng County 商城县
- County
- Location of the seat in Henan
- Coordinates: 31°47′53″N 115°24′25″E
- Country: People's Republic of China
- Province: Henan
- Prefecture-level city: Xinyang

Area
  - Total: 2,117 km^{2} (817 sq mi)

Population (2019)
  - Total: 527,300
  - Density: 249.1/km^{2} (645.1/sq mi)
- Time zone: UTC+8 (China Standard)
- Postal code: 465350
- Area code: 0376
- Website: Official Website

Shangcheng County (Chinese: 商城县; pinyin: Shāngchéng Xiàn) is a county of Henan province, China, containing the province's southernmost point and bordering Anhui to the southeast as well as Hubei to the south and southwest. It is under the administration of Xinyang City.

== Administrative divisions ==
As of 2012, this county is divided to 8 towns and 11 townships.

Towns

- Chengguan (城关镇)
- Shangshiqiao (上石桥镇)
- Shuangchunpu (双椿铺镇)
- Wangqiao (汪桥镇)
- Yuji (余集镇)
- Yangang (鄢岗镇)
- Daquandian (达权店镇)
- Fengji (丰集镇)

Townships

- Jingangtai Township (金刚台乡)
- Fengdian Township (冯店乡)
- Liji Township (李集乡)
- Nianyushan Township (鲇鱼山乡)
- Suxianshi Township (苏仙石乡)
- Wanggang Township (汪岗乡)
- Wuhe Township (吴河乡)
- Changzhuyuan Township (长竹园乡)
- Hefengqiao Township (河凤桥乡)
- Guanmiao Township (观庙乡)
- Fushan Township (伏山乡)

== Climate ==
Climate data for Shangcheng, elevation 92 m (302 ft), (1991–2020 normals, extremes 1981–2010)
Month	Jan	Feb	Mar	Apr	May	Jun	Jul	Aug	Sep	Oct	Nov	Dec	Year
Record high °C (°F)	23.3 (73.9)	28.2 (82.8)	32.2 (90.0)	34.8 (94.6)	36.5 (97.7)	37.4 (99.3)	40.5 (104.9)	39.0 (102.2)	37.9 (100.2)	33.9 (93.0)	30.6 (87.1)	24.6 (76.3)	40.5 (104.9)
Mean daily maximum °C (°F)	7.4 (45.3)	10.5 (50.9)	15.9 (60.6)	22.4 (72.3)	26.9 (80.4)	29.8 (85.6)	32.1 (89.8)	31.1 (88.0)	27.5 (81.5)	22.5 (72.5)	16.2 (61.2)	9.9 (49.8)	21.0 (69.8)
Daily mean °C (°F)	2.9 (37.2)	5.6 (42.1)	10.7 (51.3)	16.9 (62.4)	21.8 (71.2)	25.3 (77.5)	27.9 (82.2)	26.8 (80.2)	22.5 (72.5)	17.0 (62.6)	10.8 (51.4)	5.0 (41.0)	16.1 (61.0)
Mean daily minimum °C (°F)	−0.4 (31.3)	2.0 (35.6)	6.6 (43.9)	12.3 (54.1)	17.6 (63.7)	21.6 (70.9)	24.6 (76.3)	23.6 (74.5)	18.9 (66.0)	13.1 (55.6)	6.8 (44.2)	1.5 (34.7)	12.4 (54.2)
Record low °C (°F)	−12.9 (8.8)	−10.5 (13.1)	−2.9 (26.8)	0.4 (32.7)	7.2 (45.0)	13.1 (55.6)	17.6 (63.7)	14.9 (58.8)	8.7 (47.7)	2.3 (36.1)	−5.8 (21.6)	−14.2 (6.4)	−14.2 (6.4)
Average precipitation mm (inches)	42.4 (1.67)	48.7 (1.92)	75.3 (2.96)	96.2 (3.79)	124.3 (4.89)	179.2 (7.06)	229.0 (9.02)	154.9 (6.10)	86.4 (3.40)	70.8 (2.79)	56.1 (2.21)	31.0 (1.22)	1,194.3 (47.03)
Average precipitation days (≥ 0.1 mm)	6.6	7.9	8.7	7.9	9.5	9.9	12.3	11.3	8.6	7.8	7.7	5.9	104.1
Average snowy days	5.6	3.4	1.3	0	0	0	0	0	0	0	0.8	2.0	13.1
Average relative humidity (%)	75	75	71	70	72	78	80	83	79	76	75	73	76
Mean monthly sunshine hours	106.1	108.4	141.6	168.0	174.0	164.6	188.0	172.9	148.6	145.6	134.3	123.5	1,775.6
Percentage possible sunshine	33	34	38	43	41	39	44	42	40	42	43	40	40
Source: China Meteorological Administration
