= Da jiu-jia =

Chinese snack food

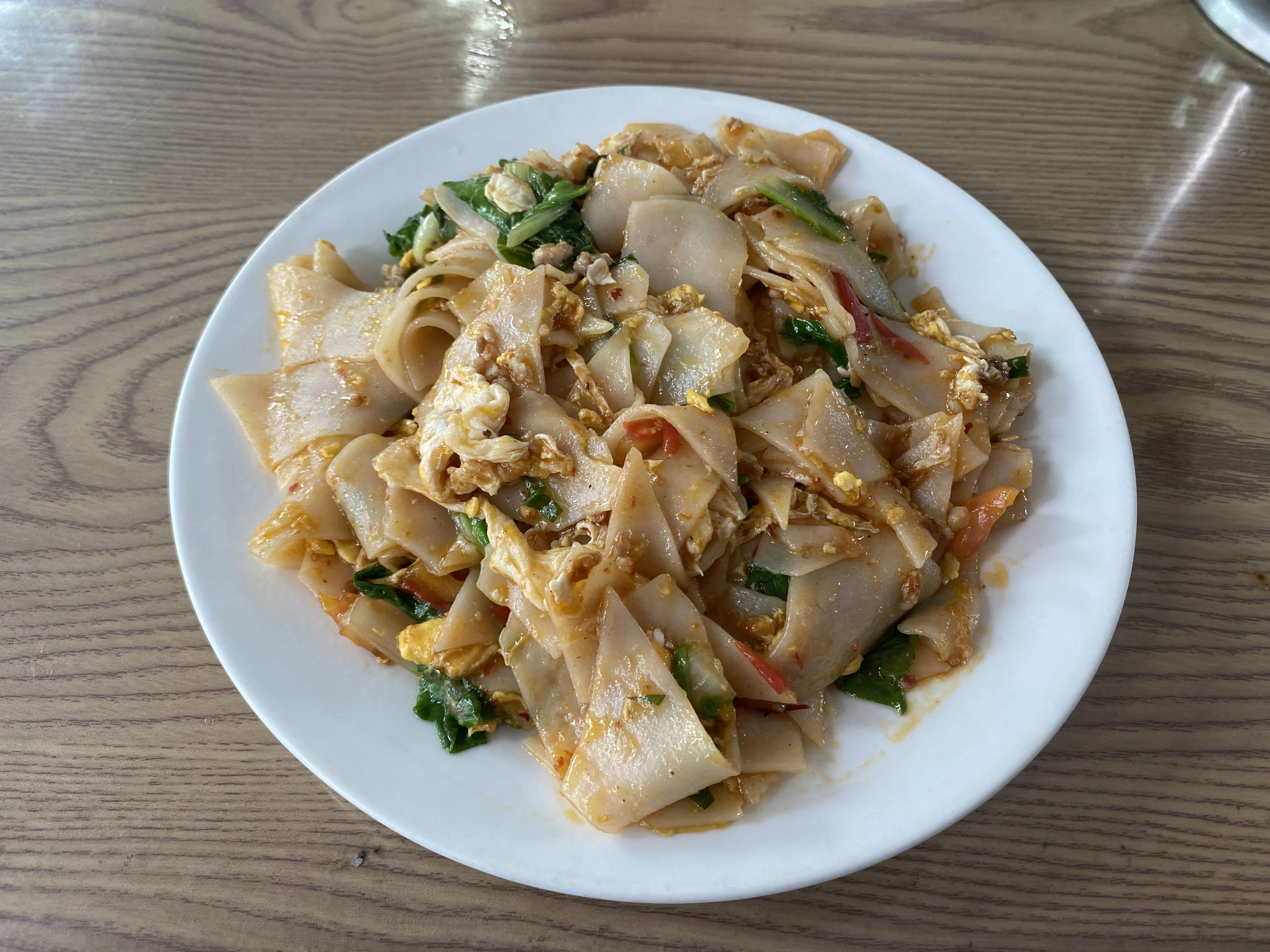
- Da jiu-jia
- Type: Stir-fry
- Course: Main Course
- Place of origin: Yunnan, China
- Region or state: Southwest China
- Main ingredients: Meat (usually pork belly), Erkuai, Spinach, Soy Sauce, Egg

Da jiu-jia, (Chinese: 大救駕) is a type of Chinese stir-fry that consists of Erkuai (Chinese: 饵块; pinyin: ĕrkuāi) cut into thin slices before being fried with pork, egg, soy sauce, and vegetables. Da jiu-jia is commonly paired with a soup but can be eaten alone.

== Origin ==
The name da jiu-ja literally translates to 'saving the life of the emperor' due to an old legend regarding Zhu Youlang and his flee from Wu Sangui and the Qing dynasty

According to legend, as Youlang fled south towards Burma, he stopped at the city of Tengchong in Yunnan. Exhausted and starving, Youlang asked a farmhouse owner to make him food. Using erkuai, ham, eggs and vegetables, the owner fed the emperor to which Youlang simply stated "erkuai has saved my life"
