= Wuhe, Wuwei, Gansu =

Wuhe 五和镇
- Town
- Location in Gansu
- Coordinates: 38°2′42″N 102°30′19″E
- Country: People's Republic of China
- Province: Gansu
- Prefecture-level city: Wuwei
- District: Liangzhou District
- Time zone: UTC+8 (China Standard)

Wuhe (Chinese: 五和; pinyin: Wǔhé) is a town under the administration of Liangzhou District, Wuwei, Gansu, China. As of 2020, it administers Wuhe Residential Community and the following eight villages:

- Wuhe Village
- Shajin Village (沙金村)
- Wu'ai Village (五爱村)
- Xiazhai Village (下寨村)
- Houji Village (候吉村)
- Shengli Village (胜利村)
- Zhizhai Village (支寨村)
- Xingou Village (新沟村)
