= Wuhe Township, Henan =

Wuhe Township 吴河乡
- Township
- Location in Henan
- Coordinates: 31°43′45″N 115°16′38″E
- Country: People's Republic of China
- Province: Henan
- Prefecture-level city: Xinyang
- County: Shangcheng County
- Time zone: UTC+8 (China Standard)

Wuhe Township (simplified Chinese: 吴河乡; traditional Chinese: 吳河鄉; pinyin: Wúhé Xiāng) is a township under the administration of Shangcheng County, Henan, China. As of 2020, it has 16 villages under its administration:

- Wuhe Village
- Zengwa Village (曾洼村)
- Macao Village (马槽村)
- Guomiao Village (郭庙村)
- Zhangdian Village (掌店村)
- Qizhongwan Village (漆中湾村)
- Fanqi Village (范棋村)
- Chenwa Village (陈洼村)
- Gaojiafan Village (高家畈村)
- Shenfan Village (沈畈村)
- Zengyoufang Village (曾油坊村)
- Liujiafan Village (六甲畈村)
- Wan'an Village (万安村)
- Qingtang'ao Village (清塘坳村)
- Lianhuashan Village (莲花山村)
- Kaijuesi Village (开觉寺村)
