= Wuhe Township, Yunnan =

Wuhe Township 五合乡
- Township
- Location in Yunnan
- Coordinates: 24°51′49″N 98°40′3″E
- Country: People's Republic of China
- Province: Yunnan
- Prefecture-level city: Baoshan
- County-level city: Tengchong
- Time zone: UTC+8 (China Standard)

Wuhe Township (simplified Chinese: 五合乡; traditional Chinese: 五合鄉; pinyin: Wǔhé Xiāng) is a township under the administration of Tengchong, Yunnan, China. As of 2020, it has three residential communities and ten villages under its administration.

Communities

- Wuhe Community
- Lameng Community (腊勐社区)
- Jintang Community (金塘社区)

Villages

- Lushan Village (鹿山村)
- Laozhai Village (老寨村)
- Nanong Village (那弄村)
- Xiangshan Village (象山社区)
- Bingnong Village (丙弄社区)
- Lianmeng Village (联盟社区)
- Zhengding Village (整顶社区)
- Tenglang Village (腾朗社区)
- Huazhai Village (花寨村)
- Guantian Village (官田村)
