= Wuhe, Anqing =

Wuhe 五河镇
- Town
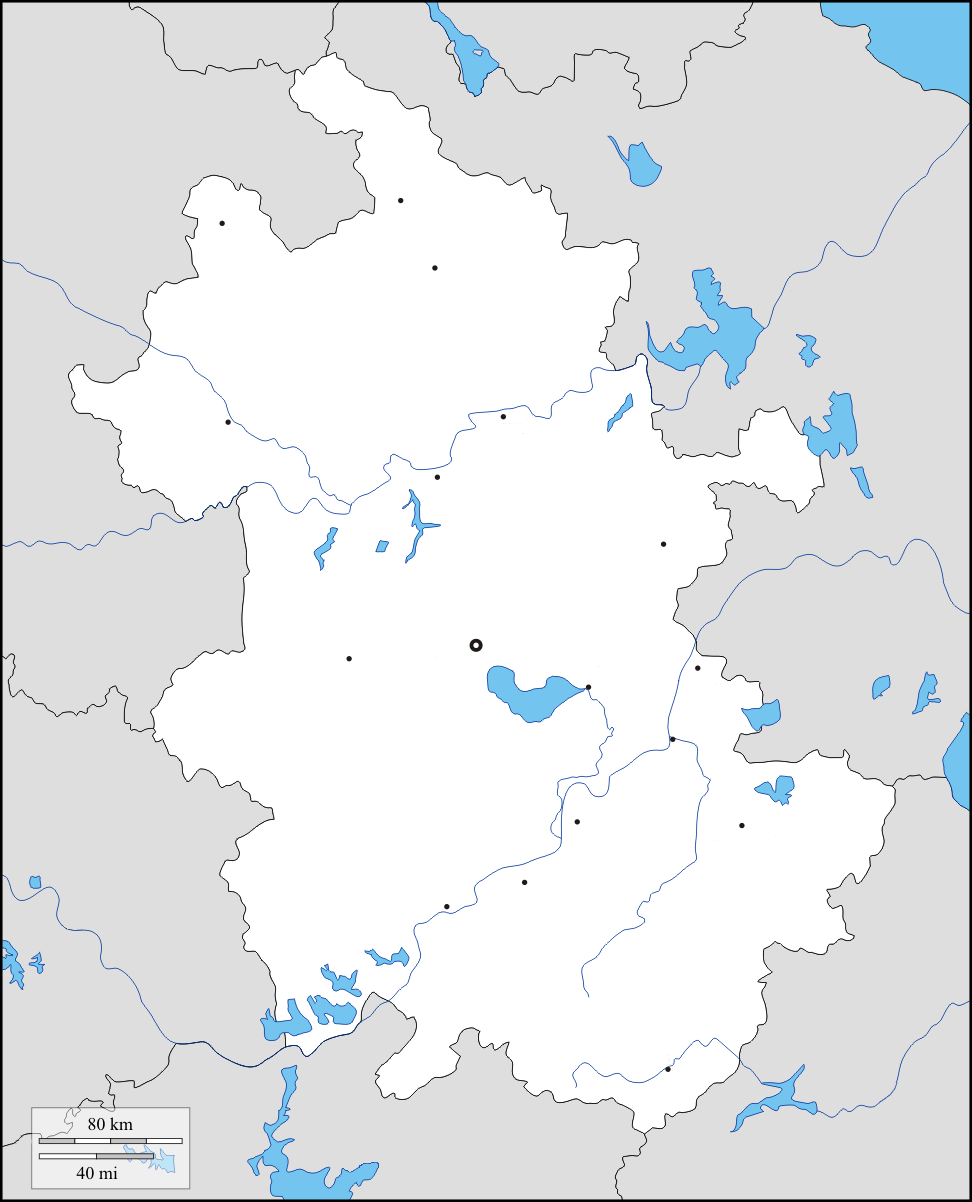
- Location in Anhui Wuhe (China)
- Coordinates: 30°49′15″N 116°12′28″E
- Country: People's Republic of China
- Province: Anhui
- Prefecture-level city: Anqing
- County: Yuexi County
- Time zone: UTC+8 (China Standard)

Wuhe (Chinese: 五河; pinyin: Wǔhé) is a town under the administration of Yuexi County, Anhui, China. As of 2020, it has 12 villages under its administration:

- Wuhe Village
- Shaling Village (沙岭村)
- Yehe Village (叶河村)
- Hengpai Village (横排村)
- Baibu Village (百步村)
- Sihe Village (思河村)
- Xiangshan Village (响山村)
- Taoli Village (桃李村)
- Miaodaoshan Village (妙道山村)
- Maoshan Village (茅山村)
- Henan Village (河南村)
- Shuanghe Village (双河村)

== See also ==
- List of township-level divisions of Anhui
