= Yuexi County, Anhui =

Yuexi 岳西县
- County

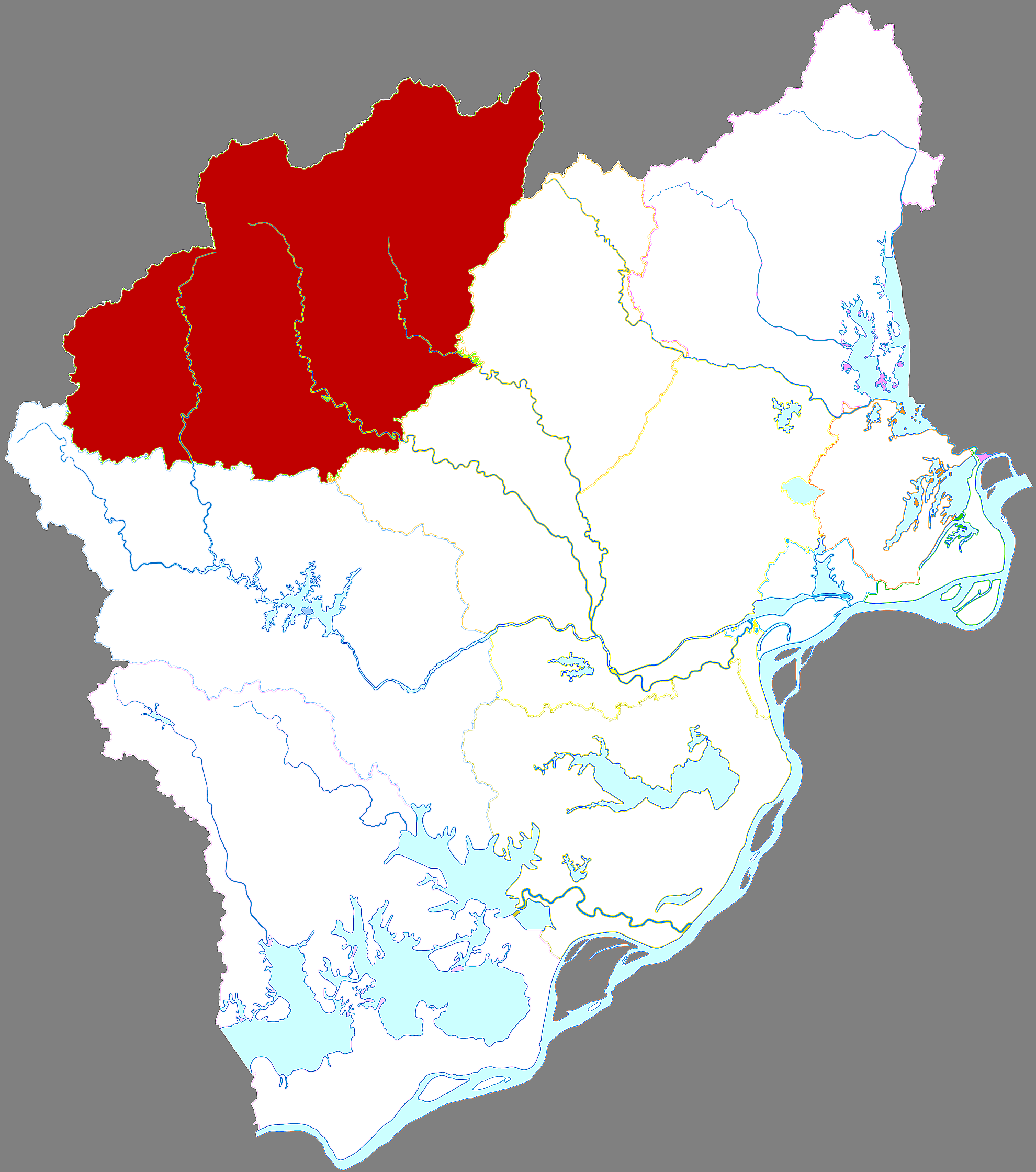
- Yuexi in Anqing

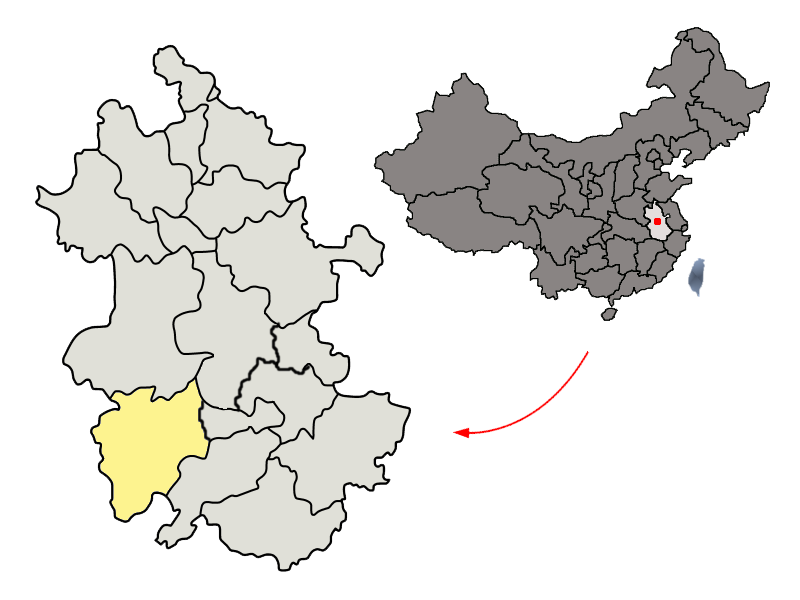
- Anqing in Anhui
- Coordinates: 30°50′58″N 116°21′36″E
- Country: China
- Province: Anhui
- Prefecture-level city: Anqing
- County seat: Tiantang

Area
  - Total: 2,398 km^{2} (926 sq mi)

Population (2020)
  - Total: 323,837
  - Density: 135.0/km^{2} (349.8/sq mi)
- Time zone: UTC+8 (China Standard)
- Postal code: 246600

Yuexi County (simplified Chinese: 岳西县; traditional Chinese: 岳西縣; pinyin: Yuèxī Xiàn), is a county in the southwest of Anhui Province, China, bordering Hubei Province to the west. It is under the jurisdiction of the prefecture-level city of Anqing. It has a population of 400,000 and an area of 2,398 km^{2} (926 sq mi). The government of Yuexi County is located in Tiantang Town.

== Administrative divisions ==
Yuexi County has jurisdiction over 14 towns and 10 townships.

Towns

- Tiantang (天堂镇), Dianqian (店前镇), Laipang (来榜镇), Changpu (菖蒲镇), Toutuo (头陀镇), Baimao (白帽镇), Wenquan (温泉镇), Xiangchang (响肠镇), Hetu (河图镇), Wuhe (五河镇), Zhubu (主簿镇), Yexi (冶溪镇), Huangwei (黄尾镇), Zhongguan (中关镇)

Townships

- Lianyun Township (莲云乡), Qingtian Township (青天乡), Baojia Township (包家乡), Gufang Township (古坊乡), Tiantou Township (田头乡), Shiguan Township (石关乡), Yaohe Township (姚河乡), Heping Township, Yuexi County (和平乡), Weiling Township (巍岭乡), Maojianshan Township (毛尖山乡)

== Education ==
Founded in 1943, Anhui Yuexi High School is the county's inaugural complete secondary school following the founding of the People's Republic of China in 1949.

== Climate ==
Climate data for Yuexi, elevation 434 m (1,424 ft), (1991–2020 normals, extremes 1981–present)
Month	Jan	Feb	Mar	Apr	May	Jun	Jul	Aug	Sep	Oct	Nov	Dec	Year
Record high °C (°F)	21.6 (70.9)	24.3 (75.7)	32.6 (90.7)	31.0 (87.8)	34.9 (94.8)	36.3 (97.3)	38.0 (100.4)	38.3 (100.9)	36.3 (97.3)	32.8 (91.0)	27.9 (82.2)	23.0 (73.4)	38.3 (100.9)
Mean daily maximum °C (°F)	8.2 (46.8)	10.7 (51.3)	15.3 (59.5)	21.5 (70.7)	25.7 (78.3)	28.2 (82.8)	31.0 (87.8)	30.9 (87.6)	27.4 (81.3)	22.5 (72.5)	16.8 (62.2)	10.8 (51.4)	20.8 (69.4)
Daily mean °C (°F)	2.5 (36.5)	4.9 (40.8)	9.1 (48.4)	15.1 (59.2)	19.9 (67.8)	23.1 (73.6)	26.0 (78.8)	25.2 (77.4)	21.4 (70.5)	15.9 (60.6)	10.0 (50.0)	4.4 (39.9)	14.8 (58.6)
Mean daily minimum °C (°F)	−1.3 (29.7)	0.9 (33.6)	4.6 (40.3)	10.3 (50.5)	15.3 (59.5)	19.3 (66.7)	22.4 (72.3)	21.7 (71.1)	17.3 (63.1)	11.3 (52.3)	5.3 (41.5)	0.1 (32.2)	10.6 (51.1)
Record low °C (°F)	−11.2 (11.8)	−8.9 (16.0)	−6.9 (19.6)	−0.7 (30.7)	4.6 (40.3)	10.4 (50.7)	15.6 (60.1)	14.9 (58.8)	7.1 (44.8)	−0.6 (30.9)	−6.7 (19.9)	−12.8 (9.0)	−12.8 (9.0)
Average precipitation mm (inches)	53.3 (2.10)	72.2 (2.84)	106.5 (4.19)	144.7 (5.70)	169.5 (6.67)	266.9 (10.51)	260.4 (10.25)	194.5 (7.66)	108.5 (4.27)	61.6 (2.43)	51.9 (2.04)	35.8 (1.41)	1,525.8 (60.07)
Average precipitation days (≥ 0.1 mm)	11.1	11.2	13.7	13.0	13.9	14.8	15.1	16.3	9.9	9.6	9.0	8.0	145.6
Average snowy days	6.6	3.6	1.8	0.1	0	0	0	0	0	0	0.6	2.1	14.8
Average relative humidity (%)	74	75	74	74	76	82	83	84	79	76	75	72	77
Mean monthly sunshine hours	124.7	117.2	143.3	170.7	180.9	159.6	195.5	196.8	172.0	164.8	153.3	144.5	1,923.3
Percentage possible sunshine	39	37	38	44	42	38	46	48	47	47	49	46	43
Source: China Meteorological Administration

== Transport ==
- China National Highway 318
