= Wuhe Township, Sichuan =

Wuhe Township 五合乡
- Township
- Location in Sichuan
- Coordinates: 30°29′19″N 104°51′8″E
- Country: People's Republic of China
- Province: Sichuan
- Prefecture-level city: Chengdu
- County-level city: Jianyang
- Time zone: UTC+8 (China Standard)

Wuhe Township (simplified Chinese: 五合乡; traditional Chinese: 五合鄉; pinyin: Wǔhé Xiāng) is a township under the administration of Jianyang, Sichuan, China. As of 2018, it has 13 villages under its administration.
