= Guangning County =

Guangning 广宁县 Kwongning
- County
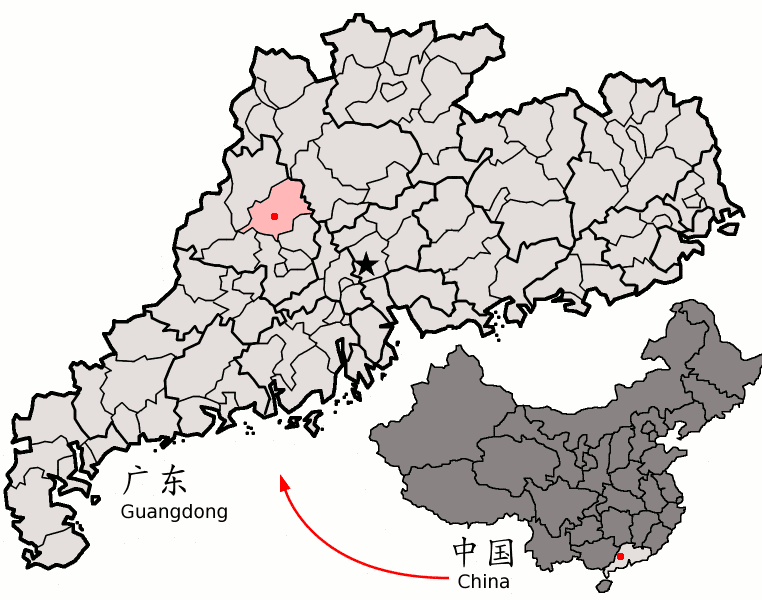
- Location of the county in Zhaoqing and Guangdong

- Location of the seat in Guangdong
- Coordinates: 23°03′N 112°27′E
- Country: People's Republic of China
- Province: Guangdong
- Prefecture-level city: Zhaoqing

Area
  - County: 2,380 km^{2} (920 sq mi)

Population
  - County: 408,112
  - Density: 171/km^{2} (444/sq mi)
  - Urban: 164,249
- Time zone: UTC+8 (China Standard)
- Postal code: 526300
- Website: www.gdgn.gov.cn

Guangning
- Simplified Chinese: 广宁
- Traditional Chinese: 廣寧
- Jyutping: Gwong2-ning4
- Hanyu Pinyin: Guǎngníng
- Postal: Kwongning
- Literal meaning: Widely Pacified
Transcriptions
Standard Mandarin
- Hanyu Pinyin: Guǎngníng
Yue: Cantonese
- Jyutping: Gwong2-ning4

Guangning County, alternately romanized as Kwongning County, (Note: Guangning has also been romanized as Kwang Ning.) is a county in western Guangdong, China, under the administration of the prefecture-level city of Zhaoqing. Guangning County has an area of 2,380 square kilometers (920 sq mi), with a population of 408,112 (2020 census).

== Name ==
The Explanation of County Names states that the name of Guangning County—literally "widely" or "broadly pacified"—is a reference to the defeat of a large mob of bandits by the central government in 1559, shortly before the founding of the county.

== History ==
Guangning County was founded on October 30, 1559, under the Jiajing Emperor of the Ming. It has formed part of Zhaoqing since at least the Qing.

== Geography and climate ==
Lying in the valley of Sui River, Guangning has developed along the riversides.

Climate data for Guangning, elevation 93 m (305 ft), (1991–2020 normals, extremes 1957–present)
| Month | Jan | Feb | Mar | Apr | May | Jun | Jul | Aug | Sep | Oct | Nov | Dec | Year |
|---|---|---|---|---|---|---|---|---|---|---|---|---|---|
| Record high °C (°F) | 28.2 (82.8) | 31.8 (89.2) | 33.7 (92.7) | 34.0 (93.2) | 35.7 (96.3) | 38.0 (100.4) | 39.5 (103.1) | 39.4 (102.9) | 38.3 (100.9) | 35.7 (96.3) | 33.5 (92.3) | 29.1 (84.4) | 39.5 (103.1) |
| Mean daily maximum °C (°F) | 17.8 (64.0) | 19.4 (66.9) | 21.6 (70.9) | 26.3 (79.3) | 30.2 (86.4) | 32.4 (90.3) | 33.7 (92.7) | 33.6 (92.5) | 32.1 (89.8) | 29.3 (84.7) | 25.1 (77.2) | 20.2 (68.4) | 26.8 (80.3) |
| Daily mean °C (°F) | 12.5 (54.5) | 14.5 (58.1) | 17.4 (63.3) | 22.0 (71.6) | 25.4 (77.7) | 27.5 (81.5) | 28.5 (83.3) | 28.1 (82.6) | 26.5 (79.7) | 23.0 (73.4) | 18.5 (65.3) | 13.8 (56.8) | 21.5 (70.6) |
| Mean daily minimum °C (°F) | 9.0 (48.2) | 11.3 (52.3) | 14.6 (58.3) | 19.0 (66.2) | 22.2 (72.0) | 24.4 (75.9) | 25.0 (77.0) | 24.7 (76.5) | 22.9 (73.2) | 18.9 (66.0) | 14.3 (57.7) | 9.7 (49.5) | 18.0 (64.4) |
| Record low °C (°F) | −4.2 (24.4) | −0.3 (31.5) | 0.7 (33.3) | 7.5 (45.5) | 11.8 (53.2) | 15.4 (59.7) | 21.0 (69.8) | 19.9 (67.8) | 14.1 (57.4) | 6.2 (43.2) | 0.8 (33.4) | −3.2 (26.2) | −4.2 (24.4) |
| Average precipitation mm (inches) | 64.5 (2.54) | 56.0 (2.20) | 125.0 (4.92) | 194.1 (7.64) | 260.6 (10.26) | 286.2 (11.27) | 217.8 (8.57) | 249.5 (9.82) | 135.2 (5.32) | 61.0 (2.40) | 49.8 (1.96) | 43.8 (1.72) | 1,743.5 (68.62) |
| Average precipitation days (≥ 0.1 mm) | 9.5 | 10.8 | 16.4 | 16.5 | 19.1 | 20.1 | 17.2 | 17.0 | 11.5 | 5.7 | 6.8 | 7.1 | 157.7 |
| Average snowy days | 0.1 | 0 | 0 | 0 | 0 | 0 | 0 | 0 | 0 | 0 | 0 | 0 | 0.1 |
| Average relative humidity (%) | 78 | 79 | 83 | 83 | 82 | 83 | 80 | 81 | 80 | 76 | 76 | 75 | 80 |
| Mean monthly sunshine hours | 91.4 | 68.4 | 53.2 | 76.0 | 119.6 | 144.2 | 193.9 | 183.1 | 172.5 | 182.0 | 153.9 | 135.9 | 1,574.1 |
| Percentage possible sunshine | 27 | 21 | 14 | 20 | 29 | 36 | 47 | 46 | 47 | 51 | 47 | 41 | 36 |
Source: China Meteorological AdministrationAll-time July (and all time record) and August record highsall-time record low

== Administrative divisions ==
The town of Nanjie is the centre of administration in this county. There are 16 other towns in Guangning. They are:

| Name | Chinese (S) | Hanyu Pinyin | Population (2010) | Area (km^{2}) |
|---|---|---|---|---|
| Paisha town | 排沙镇 | Páishā Zhèn | 20,527 | 154 |
| Tanpu town | 潭布镇 | Tánpǔ Zhèn | 20,844 | 132.6 |
| Jiangtun town | 江屯镇 | Jiāngtún Zhèn | 43,155 | 238.12 |
| Luogang town | 螺岗镇 | Luógǎng Zhèn | 9,442 | 105 |
| Beishi town | 北市镇 | Běishì Zhèn | 16,458 | 230 |
| Kengkou town | 坑口镇 | Kēngkǒu Zhèn | 21,002 | 181 |
| Chikeng town | 赤坑镇 | Chìkēng Zhèn | 12,596 | 181 |
| Nanjie town | 南街镇 | Nánjiē Zhèn | 118,259 | 189.3 |
| Binheng town | 宾亨镇 | Bīnhēng Zhèn | 38,523 | 171.33 |
| Wuhe town | 五和镇 | Wǔhé Zhèn | 17,639 | 116.32 |
| Hengshan town | 横山镇 | Héngshān Zhèn | 34,355 | 137.5 |
| Muge town | 木格镇 | Mùgé Zhèn | 12,634 | 126.05 |
| Shiju town | 石咀镇 | Shíjǔ Zhèn | 9,272 | 83.56 |
| Gushui town | 古水镇 | Gǔshuǐ Zhèn | 35,334 | 263.7 |
| Zhouzi town | 洲仔镇 | Zhōuzǐ Zhèn | 13,901 | 88.53 |

- Defunct: Shijian Town, Lianhe Town

== Natural Resources ==
=== Mines ===
Tantalum, Niobium, Gold, Jade, Porcelain clay, granite etc.

=== Bamboo ===
Guangning is considered as the Hometown of Bamboo, since it has 108 million acres (440,000 km^{2}) of land built with various kinds of bamboos, and the annual production of it has reached 250 thousand tons.

== Economy ==
=== Agriculture ===
Main plants includes rice, sweet potatoes, peanuts, Sugarcane, Teas, Mulberry.

=== Industry ===
Woods processing, Chemistry, Sugar, Porcelain, Ink, Plastic, Paper-making, Bamboo-based arts.

In the year of 2002, the GDP of Guangning reached RMB 3.48 billion dollars.

== Transportation ==
Roads are accessible to cities including Zhouqing, Shenzhen, Zhuhai. Guangzhou, the capital city of Guangdong Province, is currently 2.5 hours away by bus. But with the highway and railways under construction now, by 2010, the time can be shortened to one hour.

== Tourism ==
Guangning has developed eco-tourism attractions, including The Sea of Bamboo and The Emerald Lake.

== Special Products ==
Jade Teas, bamboo and bamboo-made products, such as bamboo charcoal cloth, bamboo charcoal pillow case etc., which proved to be environmental-friendly products.{{
