= Wuhe, Guangdong =

Wuhe 五和镇
- Town
- Location in Guangdong
- Coordinates: 23°27′52″N 112°21′1″E
- Country: People's Republic of China
- Province: Guangdong
- Prefecture-level city: Zhaoqing
- County: Guangning County
- Time zone: UTC+8 (China Standard)

Wuhe (Chinese: 五和; pinyin: Wǔhé) is a town under the administration of Guangning County, Guangdong, China. As of 2020, it administers Wuhe Residential Community and the following six villages:

- Xiayuan Village (下源村)
- Jiangbu Village (江布村)
- Zhuangyuan Village (庄源村)
- Zhenyuan Village (镇源村)
- Henggang Village (横岗村)
- Cunxin Village (村心村)
