= Tengchong =

Tengchong 腾冲市
- County-level city
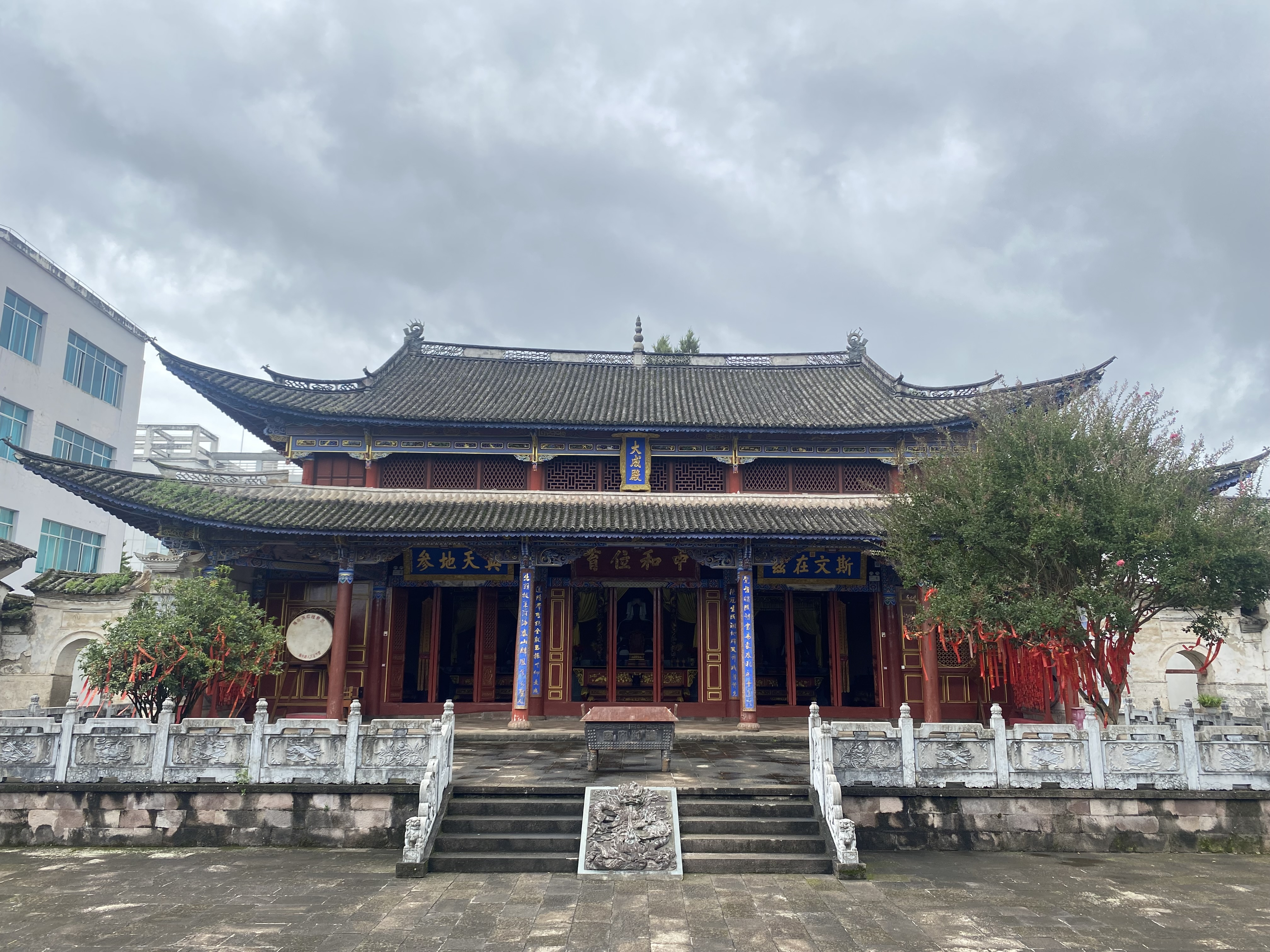
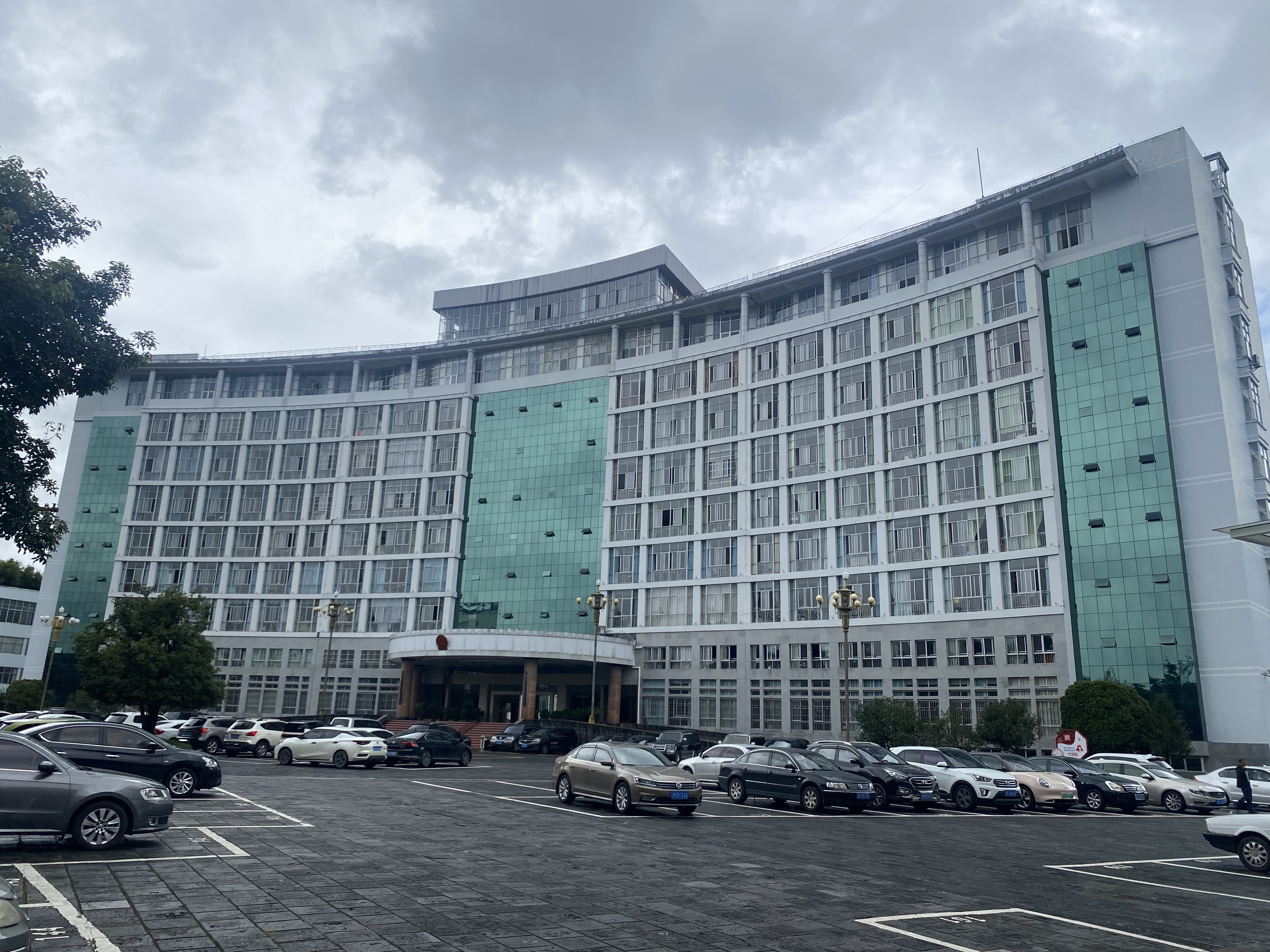
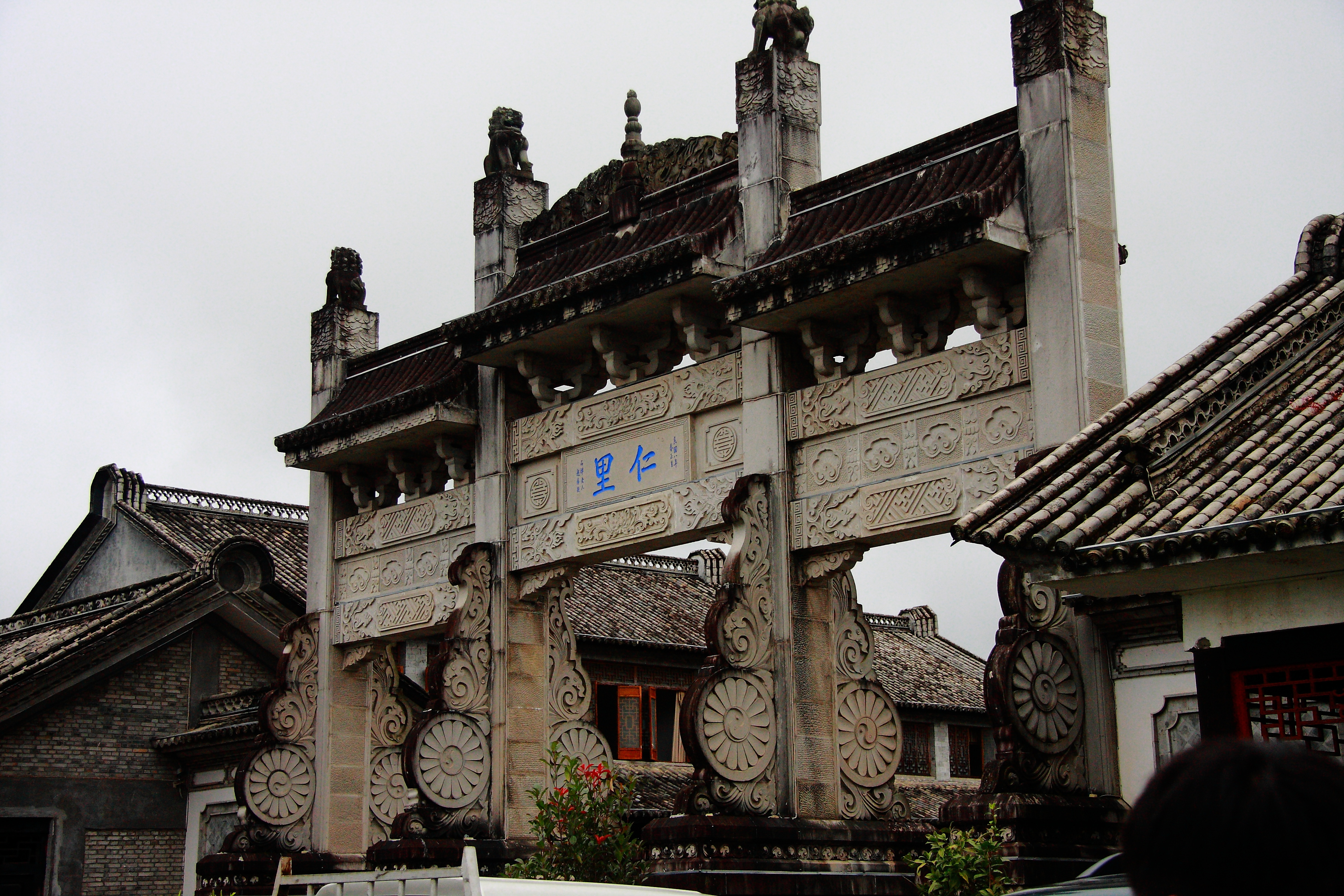
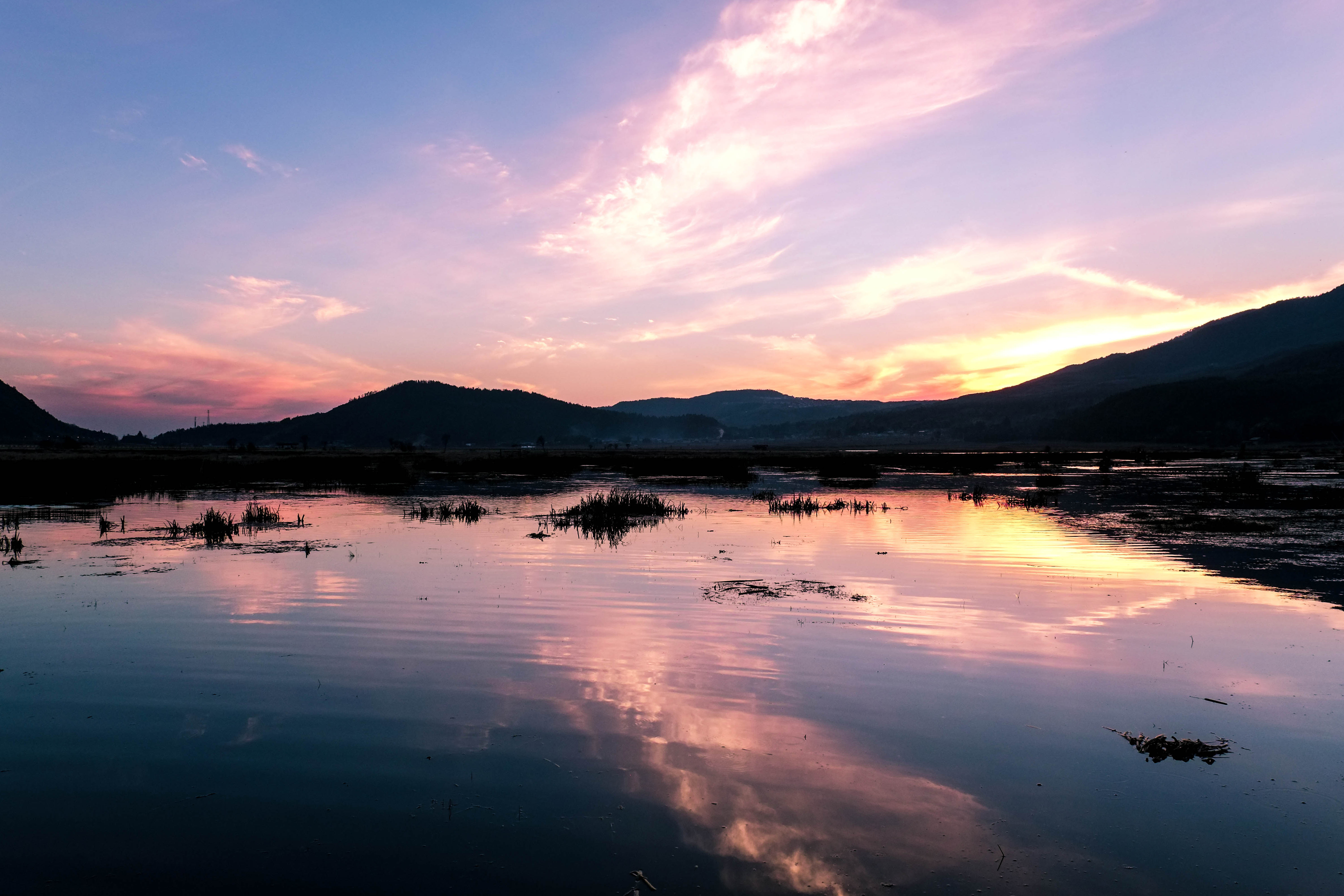
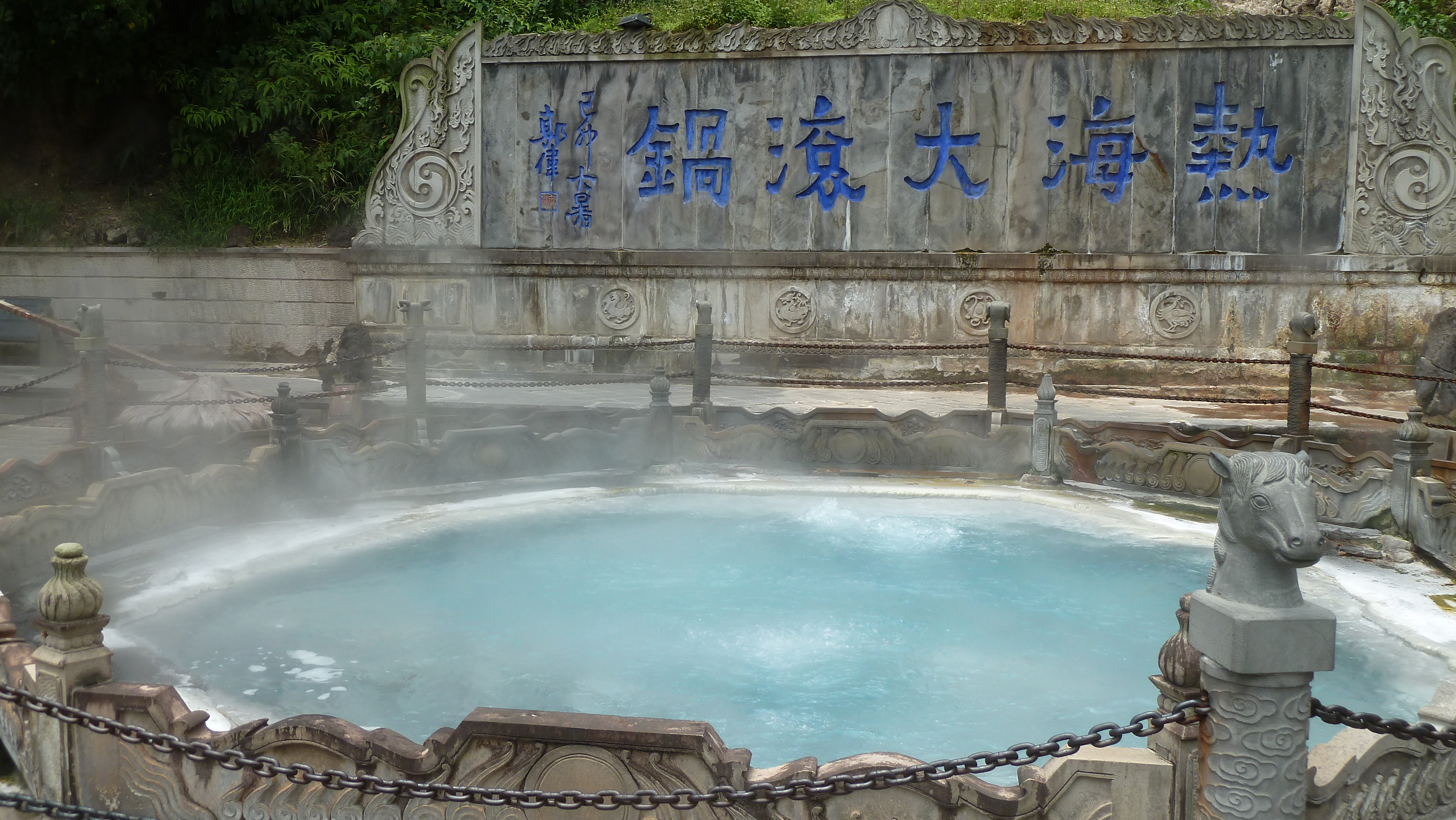
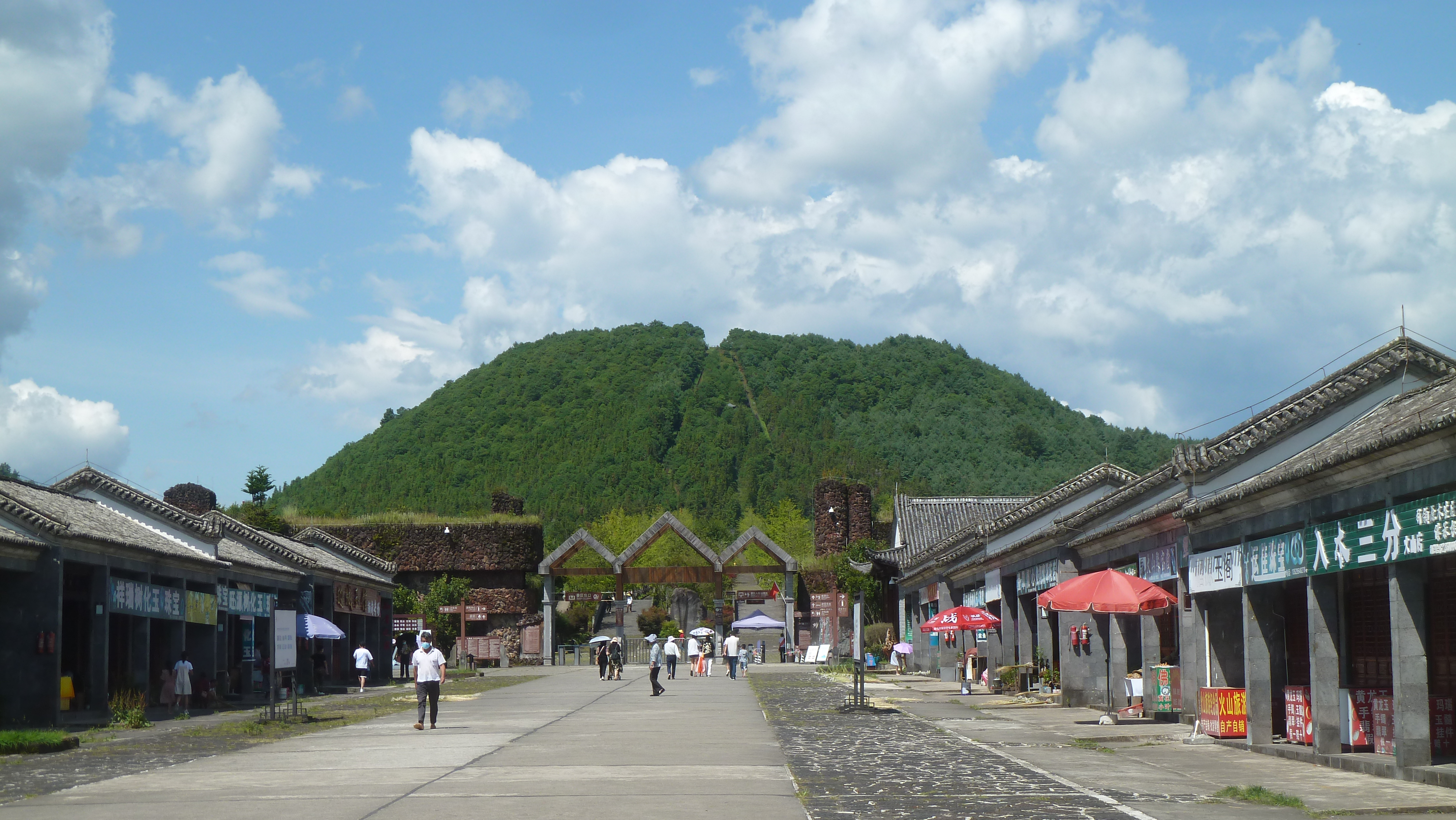
- Tengchong Confucius Temple Tengchong City Hall Heshun Old Town Beihai Wetland Rehai Hot Spring Tengchong volcanic field

- Location of Tengchong (red) in Baoshan City (pink) and Yunnan

- Location of the seat in Yunnan
- Coordinates: 25°01′N 98°29′E
- Country: People's Republic of China
- Province: Yunnan
- Prefecture-level city: Baoshan

Area
  - Total: 5,845 km^{2} (2,257 sq mi)
- Elevation: 1,667 m (5,469 ft)

Population
  - Total: 620,000
  - Density: 110/km^{2} (270/sq mi)
- Time zone: UTC+8 (China Standard)
- Postal code: 679100
- Area code: 0875
- Website: www.tengchong.gov.cn

Tengchong (Chinese: 腾冲; pinyin: Téngchōng) is a county-level city of Baoshan City, western Yunnan province, People's Republic of China. It is well known for its volcanic activity. The city is named after the town of Tengchong which serves as its political center, previously known as Tengyue (Chinese: 腾越; pinyin: Téngyuè) in Chinese. English language sources of the late nineteenth and early twentieth centuries use names such as Teng-Chung, Tingyueh, Teng Yueh, Momein and Momien.

It borders with Myanmar in the northwest for 151 km (94 mi). By road, it is 650 km (400 mi) west of the provincial capital, Kunming, and 170 km (110 mi) westward from Baoshan's urban area.

Tengchong marks the southwestern terminus of the Heihe–Tengchong Line, an imaginary line significant in geography that divides the area of China into two parts with contrasting population densities.

== History ==
=== Early history ===
Tengchong is one of the earliest developed regions in Southwest China. During the Western Han dynasty (206 BC – AD 24), it belonged to Yizhou Commandery. In the Sui (581–618) and Tang (618–907) dynasties, a contemporary prefecture governed by a local chieftain was set up. In the Yuan dynasty (1271–1368), Tengyue Prefecture was instituted. In the following dynasties, different administrative offices were set up. In 1913, Tengchong was made a county. Historically, it occupied an important position on the Southwestern Silk Route. The Sichuan cloth and bamboo sticks available at the markets in Bactria (including Afghanistan and parts of India) were brought there from the ancient Bonan Route through Tengchong. From the Ming dynasty onwards, large numbers of Tengchong people went abroad to trade and seek a livelihood. The city grew wealthy from trade with Myanmar and South East Asia due to its proximity to Mandalay across the Burmese border.

=== The British ===
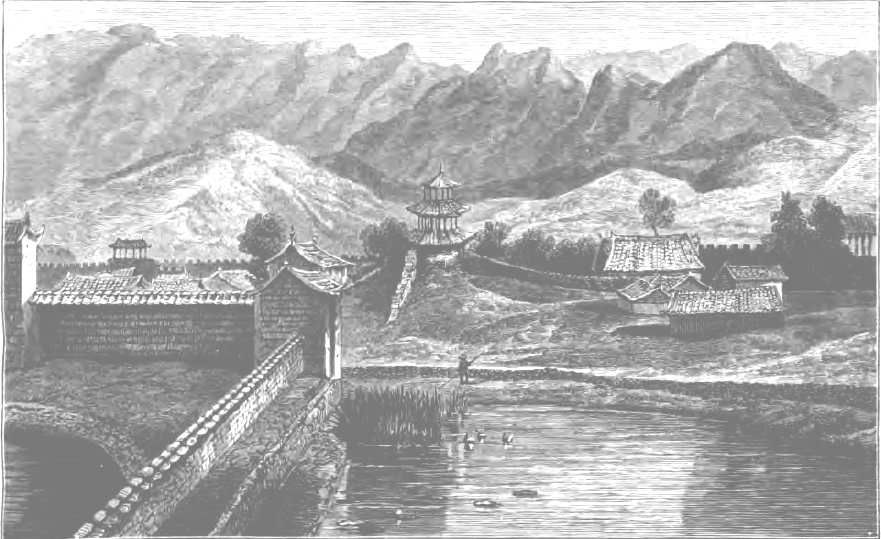
Late nineteenth century view of Tengyue (Tengchong)

In 1868, during a visit to Tengchong, British Army Major Sladen procured a woodblock printed edition of the Chinese history of the town, which was to be brought back to England and deposited at the British Museum. In the West the town is best known as the site of the murder of British diplomat Augustus Margary on February 21, 1875, an event which led to the Chefoo Convention. It was also the base of the China Inland Mission missionary James Fraser during the majority of his time working with the Lisu people. At one point British forces in British-occupied Burma established a trading post in the town with hopes of generating wealth through trade with China. In the early 20th century, a thriving cross-border trade between British-controlled Burma and China was centered around Tengchong. In 1921, construction work began on the British consulate in Tengchong, with completion 10 years later.

=== World War II ===
During World War II, the area around Tengchong was the scene of fierce battles between the Japanese who invaded from occupied Burma and combined Chinese forces of the Nationalists and communists, aided by American fighter squadrons. After the Chinese government relocated to Sichuan after the fall of Nanjing, there were grave concerns that if Yunnan fell, Japanese access to Sichuan would become relatively easy, forcing a new and cumbersome relocation, so large forces were deployed to stop the Japanese army.

== Geography ==
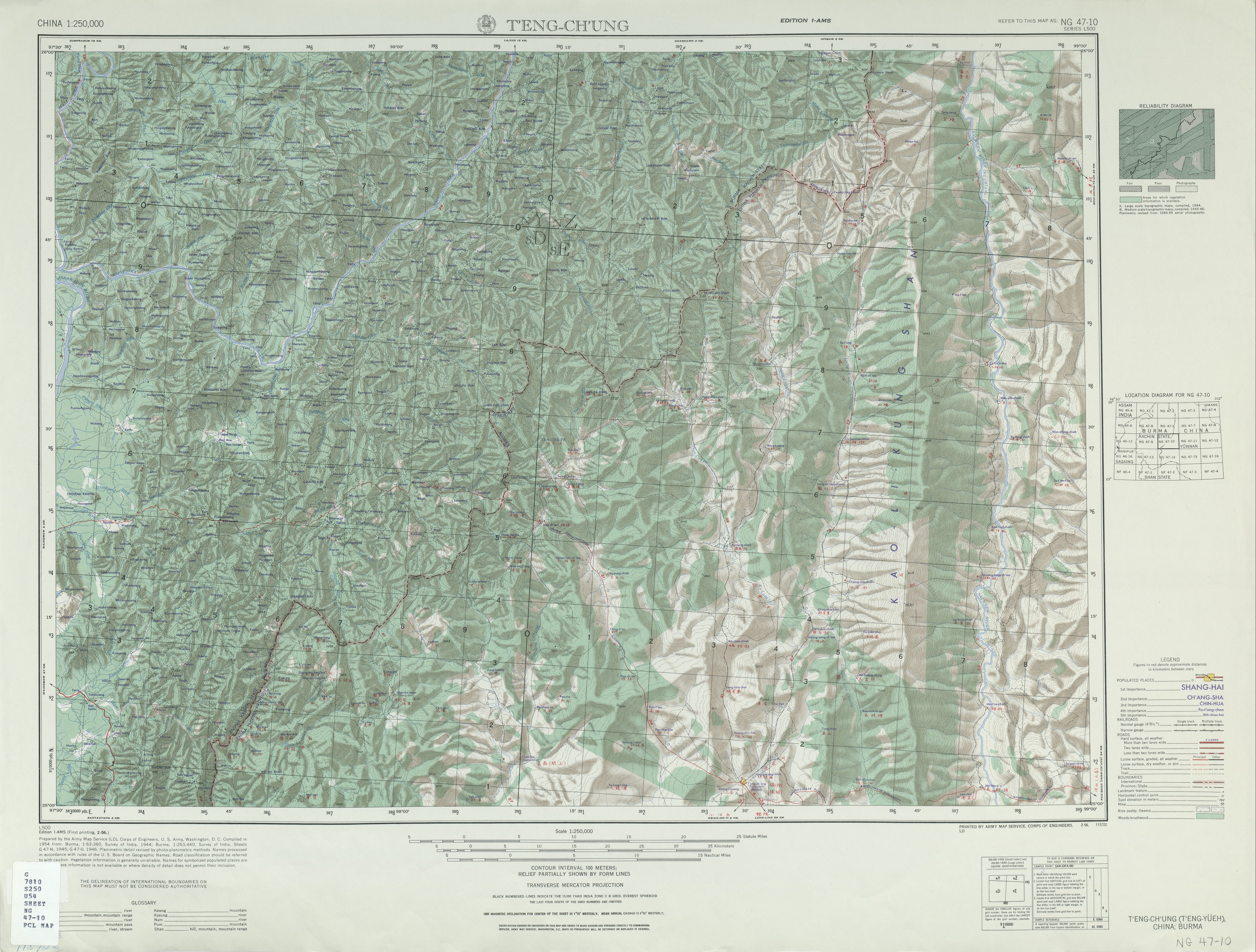
Tengchong (labelled as T'eng-ch'ung (T'eng-yüeh) 騰衝 (騰越)) (1954)

The area of Tengchong is 5,693 square kilometres (2,198 sq mi).

Situated at the southwestern end of the (transversely faulted) Hengduan Mountains, Tengchong topographically assumes the form of a horseshoe with the opening facing the south. The easternmost sources of the Irrawaddy River issue from the high mountains at the summit of Mount Danaozi of Gaoligong Mountain, 3,780.2 m (12,402 ft) above sea level and the lowest point, 930 m (3,050 ft) above sea level, is in the Suqingjiang valley. The elevation of the city seat is 1,640 m (5,380 ft).

The crustal movement in the city is active and earthquakes are frequent. The volcanoes on Dayingshan, Shitoushan, the Greater Heikongshan, the Lesser Heikong Mountains erupted repeatedly. The city seat is surrounded by a group of young volcanoes.

As is the case for most of Yunnan, Tengchong has many different ethnicities living in and around the town. Han, Dai and Lisu are dominant but also Tibetans, Bai, Aini and people with Burmese ancestry are plentiful.

=== Climate ===
As with much of the province, Tengchong experiences a mild subtropical highland climate (Köppen Cwb). Winters are mild and very dry and sunny (>60% possible sunshine), although average lows in January are barely above the freezing mark; January, the coolest month, has a 24-hour average temperature of 8.7 °C (47.7 °F). Spring begins early and remains relatively dry and sunny until May, when there is a dramatic uptick in frequency and amount of rainfall that lasts until late September. Summers are warm, rainy and generally overcast, with August, the warmest month, averaging 20.3 °C (68.5 °F). Autumn sees an abrupt reduction in rainfall and return to sunniness. The annual mean temperature is 15.6 °C (60.1 °F), while precipitation averages 1,484 mm (58 in), around two-thirds of which occurs from June to September. With monthly percent possible sunshine ranging from 19% in July to 78% in December, the city receives 2,248 hours of bright sunshine annually; in summer the city is one of the least sunny locations nationally.

Climate data for Tengchong, elevation 1,696 m (5,564 ft), (1991–2020 normals, extremes 1951–present)
Month	Jan	Feb	Mar	Apr	May	Jun	Jul	Aug	Sep	Oct	Nov	Dec	Year
Record high °C (°F)	22.7 (72.9)	25.6 (78.1)	27.9 (82.2)	29.3 (84.7)	31.4 (88.5)	30.5 (86.9)	31.0 (87.8)	31.0 (87.8)	31.4 (88.5)	29.3 (84.7)	25.4 (77.7)	23.0 (73.4)	31.4 (88.5)
Mean daily maximum °C (°F)	16.6 (61.9)	18.4 (65.1)	21.5 (70.7)	23.4 (74.1)	24.1 (75.4)	23.9 (75.0)	23.5 (74.3)	24.8 (76.6)	24.6 (76.3)	22.9 (73.2)	20.1 (68.2)	17.5 (63.5)	21.8 (71.2)
Daily mean °C (°F)	8.7 (47.7)	10.5 (50.9)	13.6 (56.5)	16.2 (61.2)	18.5 (65.3)	19.9 (67.8)	19.9 (67.8)	20.3 (68.5)	19.5 (67.1)	17.2 (63.0)	13.0 (55.4)	9.7 (49.5)	15.6 (60.1)
Mean daily minimum °C (°F)	2.8 (37.0)	4.3 (39.7)	7.4 (45.3)	10.7 (51.3)	14.3 (57.7)	17.6 (63.7)	17.9 (64.2)	17.9 (64.2)	16.8 (62.2)	13.6 (56.5)	8.1 (46.6)	4.3 (39.7)	11.3 (52.3)
Record low °C (°F)	−4.2 (24.4)	−3.6 (25.5)	−1.4 (29.5)	2.0 (35.6)	7.4 (45.3)	11.2 (52.2)	12.8 (55.0)	12.7 (54.9)	10.1 (50.2)	4.1 (39.4)	−1 (30)	−3.2 (26.2)	−4.2 (24.4)
Average precipitation mm (inches)	26.1 (1.03)	28.0 (1.10)	37.8 (1.49)	77.2 (3.04)	154.6 (6.09)	220.1 (8.67)	296.2 (11.66)	268.4 (10.57)	194.2 (7.65)	134.9 (5.31)	35.0 (1.38)	11.3 (0.44)	1,483.8 (58.43)
Average precipitation days (≥ 0.1 mm)	4.1	5.6	9.0	12.8	17.1	23.0	27.2	25.4	20.8	14.0	5.3	2.4	166.7
Average relative humidity (%)	69	66	63	68	77	86	88	86	85	82	76	73	77
Mean monthly sunshine hours	254.8	226.8	241.7	221.7	189.5	106.9	79.2	117.9	135.5	181.2	238.5	254.6	2,248.3
Percentage possible sunshine	76	71	65	58	46	26	19	30	37	51	73	78	53
Source 1: China Meteorological Administration all-time extreme temperature NOAA all-time Nov high
Source 2: Weather China

== Administrative divisions ==
Tengchong county-level city administers 11 towns and seven townships. The most notable town under Tengchong's jurisdiction is Heshun, a historical town 4 km west from Tengchong's city centre.

11 towns

- Tengyue (腾越镇)
- Gudong (固东镇)
- Diantan (滇滩镇)
- Houqiao (猴桥镇)
- Heshun (和顺镇)
- Jietou (界头镇)
- Qushi (曲石镇)
- Mingguang (明光镇)
- Zhonghe (中和镇)
- Mangbang (芒棒镇)
- Hehua (荷花镇)

7 townships

- Mazhan (马站乡)
- Beihai (北海乡)
- Qingshui (清水乡)
- Wuhe (五合乡)
- Xinhua (新华乡)
- Puchuan (蒲川乡)
- Tuantian (团田乡)

== Economy ==
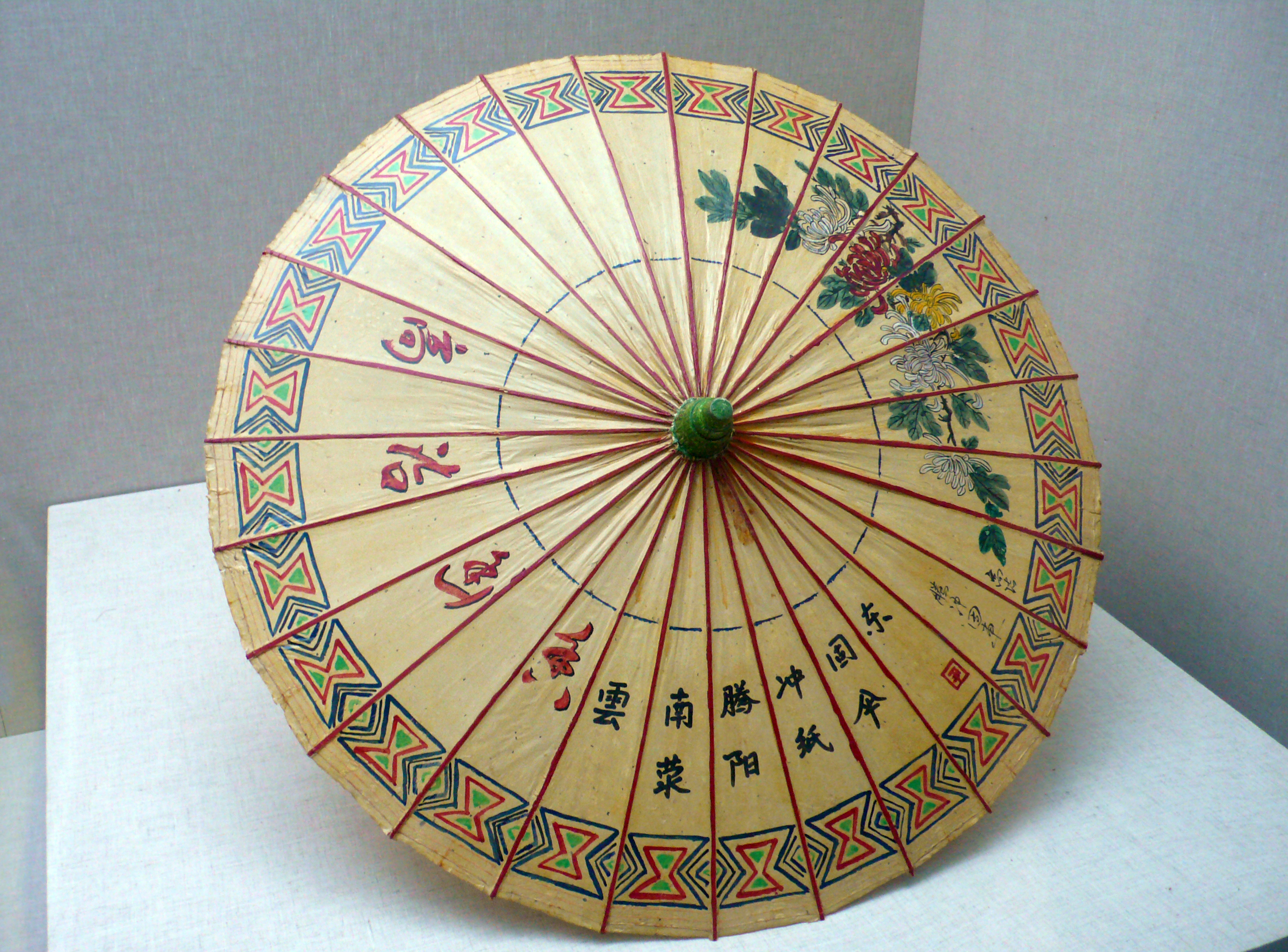
A traditional oil-paper umbrella from Tengchong

Tengchong's industry and handicraft work were fostered during the Ming and Qing Dynasties, nearly 400 years ago. Factories and workshops were set up first by importing equipment from abroad. Earlier products included textile goods, leather, soaps, battery, cigarettes, matches, etc. They found market in West Yunnan and Burma and Southeast Asian countries. Since the founding of the People's Republic, a more complete industrial system was formed, comprising 32 departments like power generating, metallurgy, machinery, paper making, textile industry, matches production, pharmacy, tanning, chemical industry, sugar refining, tea leaves refining, food processing, etc. The major products include refined tin, pig iron, crude lead, timber, plywood, cement, refractory, diatomite filtration promoter, sulphuric acid, caustic soda, hydrochlorite potassium chlorate, calcium phdrogen phosphate, paper, canesugar, refined tea leaves, preserved fruits, edible oil, matches, Chinese medicine, etc. The matches, Chinese medicine, refined tin, refined tea leaves and the "xuanzhi" (a high quality writing paper originally produced in Xuancheng) enjoy high reputation abroad.

In agriculture, Tengchong produces grain and oil crops, tobacco, tea leaves, sugarcane, etc. The production of tobacco has a history of more than 400 years. Tengchong tobacco, cultivated on the volcanic mountain slopes is of excellent quality and therefore used as a blend. The Chuanlong tea leaves and large-sized tea leaves sell particularly well.

Tengchong is known for its jade culture and for its geothermal springs and the Lisu ethnic group. The city has actually grown into the biggest processing and trade center of jadeite in Southeast Asia. While you can find some craftsmen processing jadeite at the huge jadeite market, to get a taste of the local culture, visit the Hehua (Lotus Flower) Township near the city, where there are craftsmen processing jadeite at the huge jadeite market. Du Maosheng is the chairman of the Tengchong Jewelry and Jade Association.

In recent years, Tengchong has become a centre of imported Burmese amber, which is largely smuggled over the border from Myanmar. It is estimated that around 100 tonnes passed through to Tengchong in 2015, with an estimated value between five and seven billion yuan. Burmese amber was estimated to make up 30% of Tenchong's gemstone market (the rest being jade), and was declared one of the cities eight main industries by the local government. The highest valued amber colour is deep red, referred to as 血珀 (Blood amber). Tengchong's Jade and Amber Bazaar takes place every fifth day and attracts many dealers, Burmese traders, tourists and locals.

== Natural resources ==
The city abounds in geothermal energy. There are over 80 steaming fountain hot streams and boiling fountains. Ten of them spout hot water of 90 C and upward. Natural resources are plentiful. There are over 2,000 higher plants. Among the economic and timber forests, there are forests of oil tea, catalpa, common China-fir, Armandi pine, walnut. The percentage of forest cover reaches 34.6% of the city. Ornamental and medicinal plants exist in great quantities. The blossoms of the rhododendrons on Gaoligongshan Mountain are exceptionally large. The Gaoligong Nature Reserve, renowned as a natural botanical garden, has over 1,400 species of higher plants, many rare and precious animals and medicinal plants. The area is the origin of R. giganteum forest at Tagg (a special rhododendron species) and Yunnan camellia.

Mineral resources include iron, tin, lead, zinc, wolfram, uranium, diatomite, rock crystal, wollastonite, lignite, and others.

The city also possess hydroelectric plants including Sujiahekou Hydropower Station.

== Transport ==
Tengchong is 760 km (470 mi) from Kunming. Bus and flights are both available to and from Kunming. There are daily buses to Dali, Ruili, Manche and Xishuangbanna. Daily flights to Chengdu in Sichuan as well as several daily flights from Beijing (stop-over in Kunming) have begun since the new airport opened.

=== Airport ===
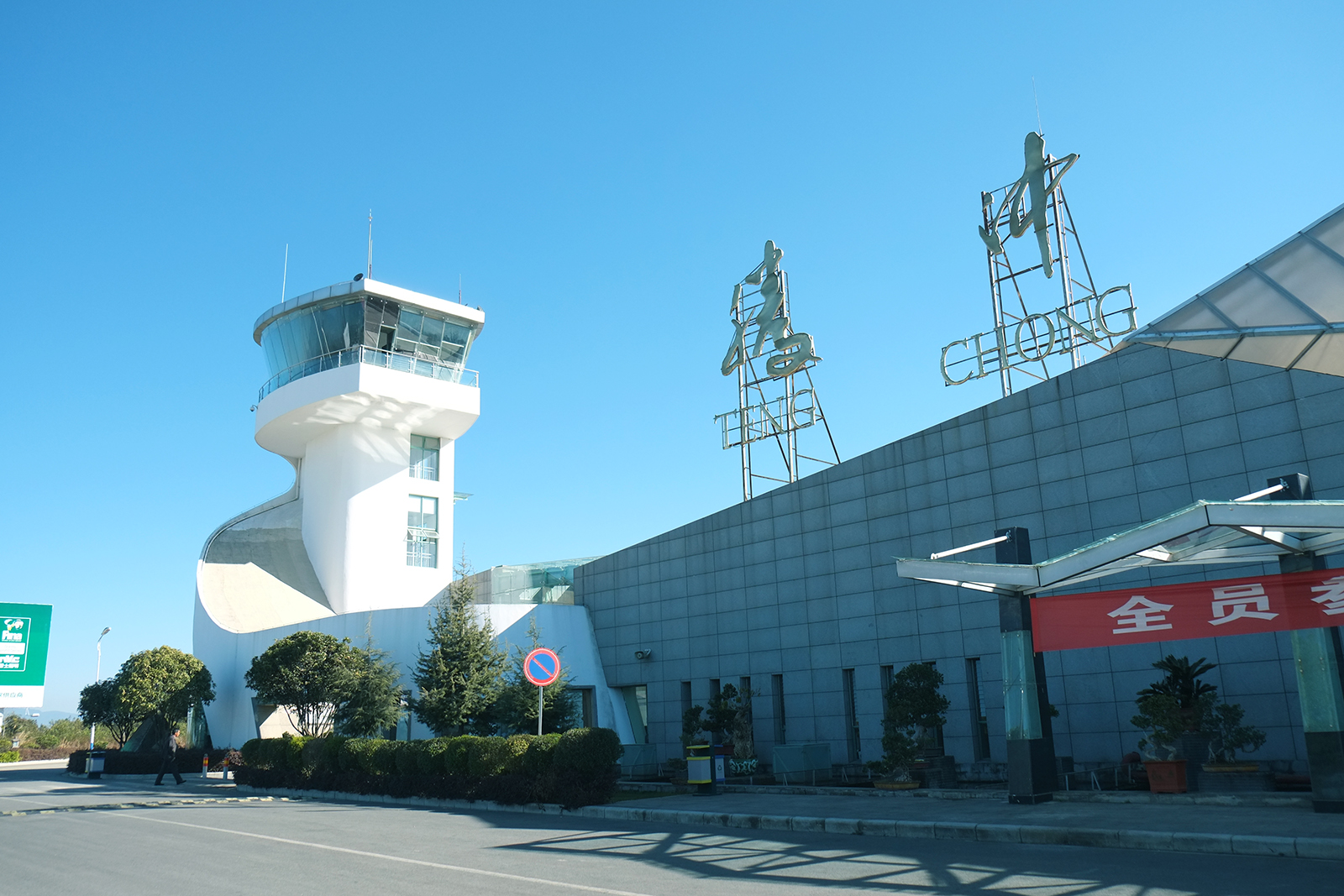
Tengchong Tuofeng Airport

Tengchong Tuofeng Airport went into service in early 2009. The airport is located at Tuofeng village, 12 kilometers from Tengchong. In memory of the Hump Route, an air route which contributed much to the victory in the west Yunnan campaign during the war against Japan, Tengchong airport is named Hump Airport. The road to the airport is named the "Flying Tigers Road" in memory of the American pilots who flew the route. The total investment in the airport is to be around RMB430 million ($54.69 million). The major investors of the project are the Yunnan Airports Group, Yunnan Guangfang Group and Tengchong government who will contribute at a proportion 46 percent, 40 percent and 10 percent respectively. The airport itself is located on a mountain plateau surrounded by peaks. Takeoffs and landings offer extensive views but can be quite unnerving.

== Tourism ==
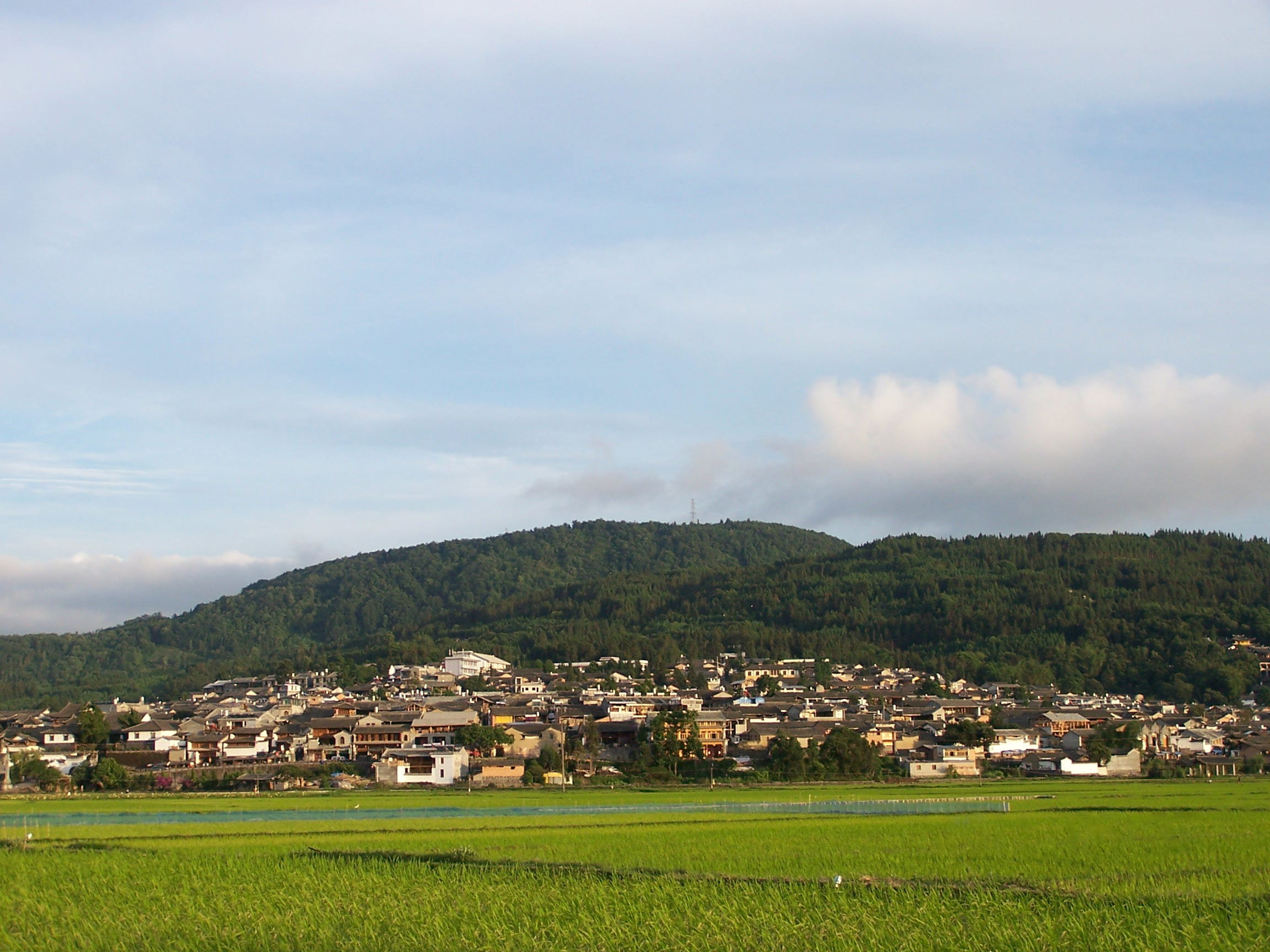
Heshun Town, Tengchong

For 2005, the city received 3.3 million tourists, with the majority of them visitors from within the province.

Various traditional villages around the town have been developed as tourist attractions. The town of Heshun features impressive architecture that was built with wealth from multi-generational trading families who sent children to Burma. The village contains a small museum dedicated to Ai Siqi, the early communist philosopher. It is based in his former house where he lived for two years. It contains pictures, personal items and a statue of him in the yard of the compound.

A large but seasonal fresh water wetland to the north attracts bird-watchers and nature-lovers, and tourists also visit a commercially developed volcanic park to the south. The recently constructed airport has brought an increase in domestic tourism. Routes to Sichuan and Beijing (over Kunming) have proved popular and the city predicts double the amount of annual visitors over the next five years. Several golf courses are in the planning stages and at least one is currently open for business, a 54-hole course located five kilometers outside of town. Several massive real estate projects are under construction aimed at selling second homes to domestic visitors. A little further from Tengchong you can visit "The Temple in the Sky" located high on a mountain which on perfect days will have a cloud cover located below it.

The southern parts of the Gaoligong Mountain range is found at the eastern outskirts of Tengchong. It is a UNESCO World Heritage Site as a part of the Three Parallel Rivers of Yunnan Protected Areas, established in 2003.

== Conservation Carbon Project ==
The Conservation Carbon Project was set up by Conservation International, Nature Conservancy and Yunnan Forestry Department to restore forests and create sustainable livelihoods in the city.

== See also ==
- Chinese jade
- Gaoligong Mountain
- Heihe-Tengchong Line
- Margary Affair
- Three Parallel Rivers of Yunnan Protected Areas – Unesco World Heritage Site
- Da jiu-jia - A Local Snack made famous because of a Ming Dynasty Emperor
