= Rice noodles =

Noodles made from rice

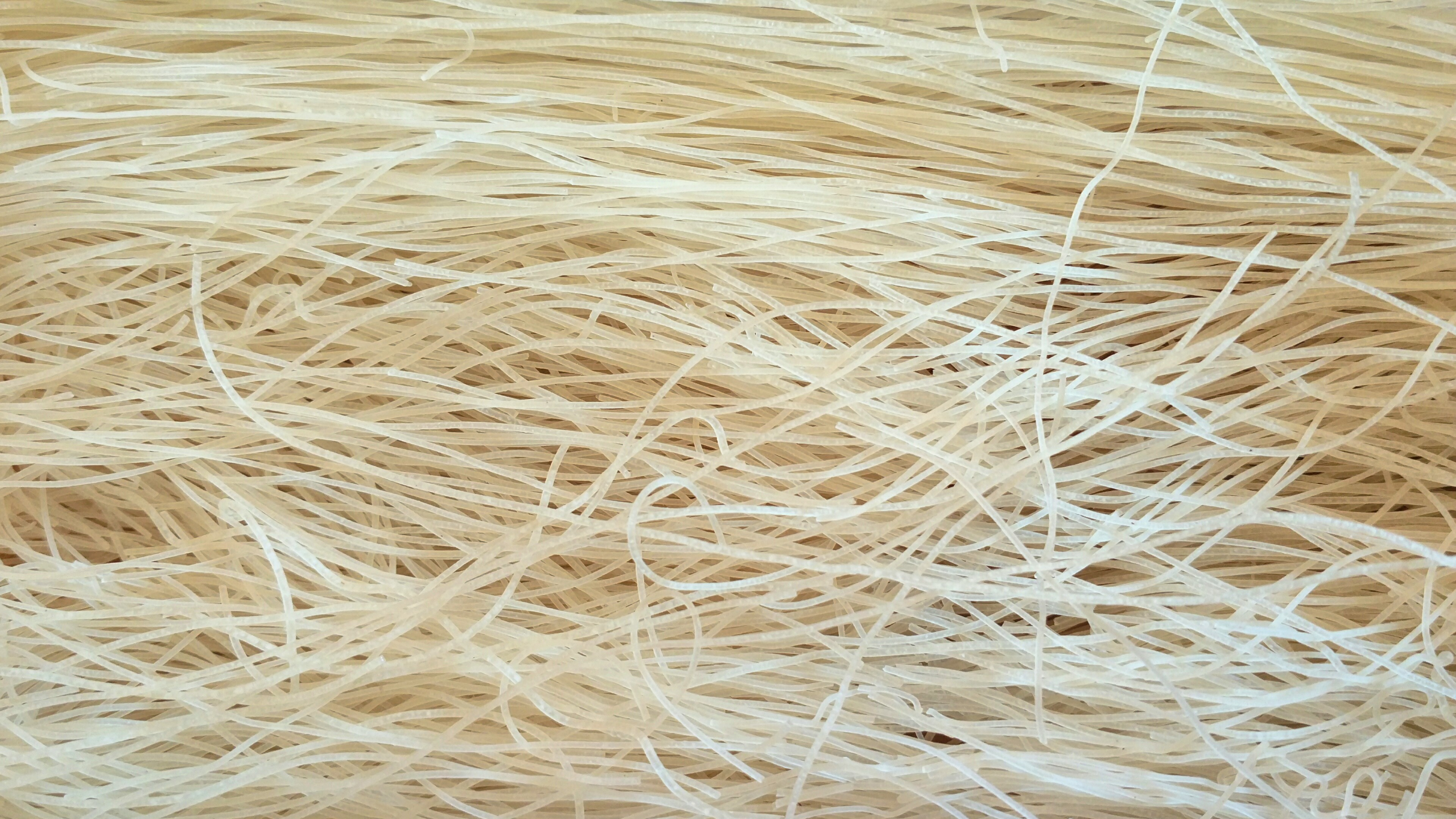
- Thin rice noodles in dried form
- Type: Noodle
- Place of origin: China
- Region or state: East Asia and Southeast Asia
- Main ingredients: Rice flour, water
- Variations: Bánh canh, bánh phở, khanom chin, kuān tiáo, lai fun, mixian, rice vermicelli, sevai, shahe fen

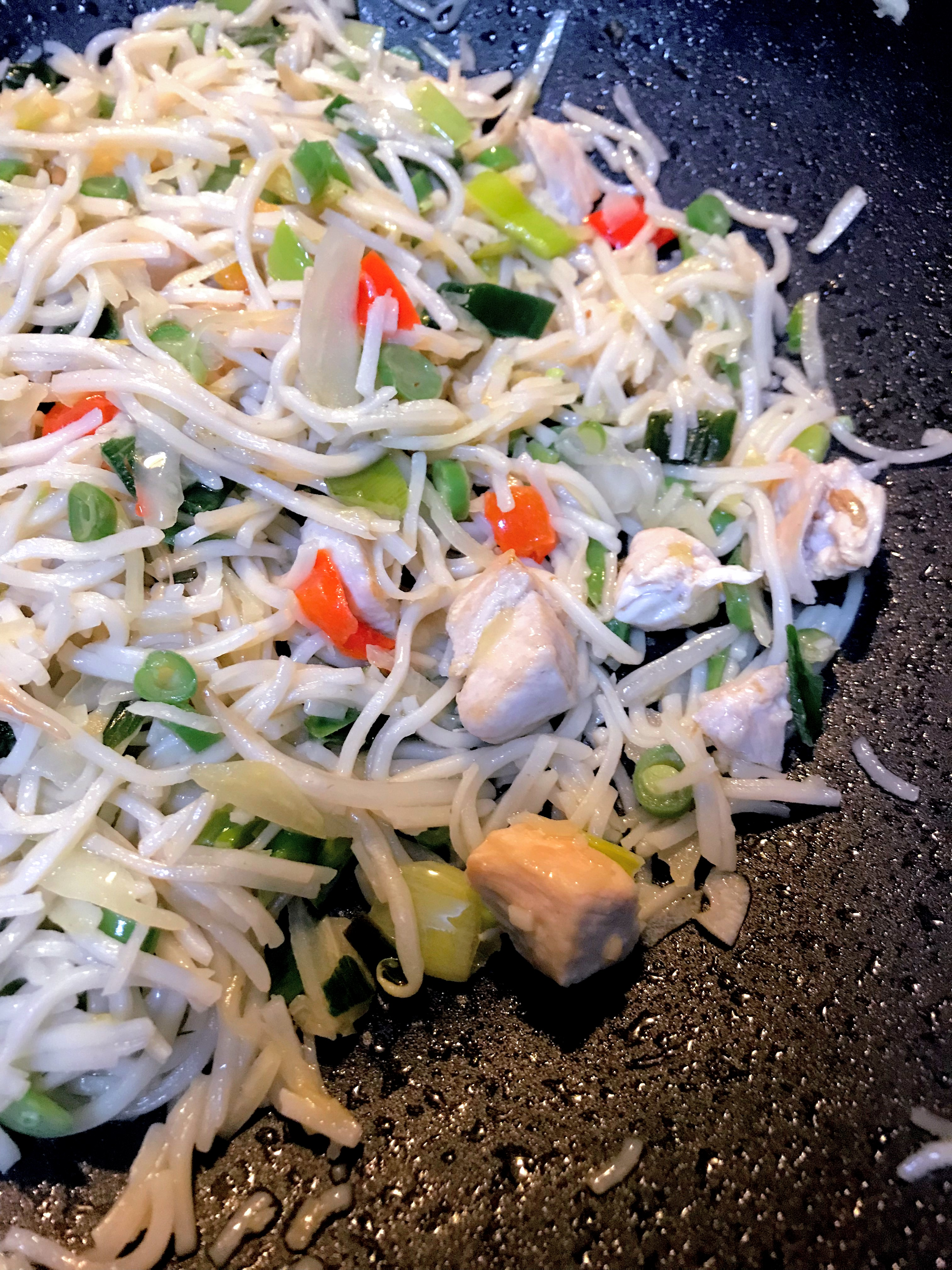
A rice noodle dish in a pan

Rice noodles are noodles made with rice flour and water as the principal ingredients. Sometimes ingredients such as tapioca or corn starch are added in order to improve the transparency or increase the gelatinous and chewy texture of the noodles. Rice noodles are most common in the cuisines of China, India and Southeast Asia. They are available fresh, frozen, or dried, in various shapes, thicknesses and textures. Fresh noodles are also highly perishable; their shelf life may be just several days.

== History ==
The origin of rice noodles dates back to China during the Qin dynasty when people from northern China settled the south. Due to climatic conditions, the northern Chinese have traditionally preferred wheat and millet which grew in cold weather while the southern Chinese preferred rice which grew in hot weather. Noodles are traditionally made out of wheat and eaten throughout northern China so to adapt, northern cooks tried to prepare "noodles" using rice, thus inventing rice noodles. Over time rice noodles and their processing methods have been introduced around the world, becoming especially popular in Southeast Asia. In India, idi-appam, strings of cooked rice, was known in ancient Tamil country around 1st century AD, as per references in the Sangam literature, according to food historian K. T. Achaya.

The shelf life may be extended by drying and removing its moisture content. Studies of drying rice noodles were conducted by the International Food Research Journal.

== Varieties ==
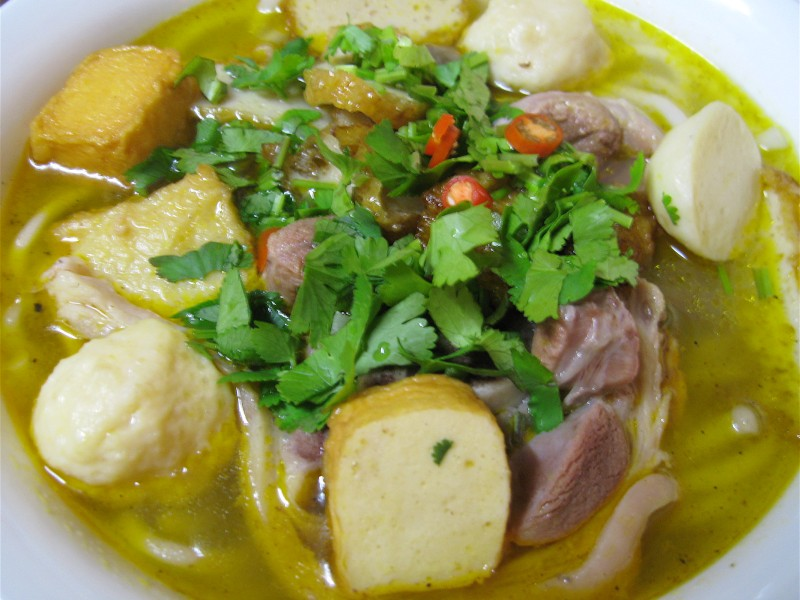
Bánh canh

=== Round thick varieties ===
- Bánh canh – thick Vietnamese noodles. The Vietnamese word bánh refers to items such as noodles or cakes that are made from flour, and canh means "soup."
- Lai fun – a short and thick variety of Chinese noodles, also referred to as bánh canh by Vietnamese
- Nan gyi thoke – thick round rice noodles mixed with specially prepared chicken curry and chili oil.
- Nan lat – medium thick round rice noodles used in Burma
- Silver needle noodles – a variety of Chinese noodles. It is short, about 5 cm long and 5 mm in diameter. Similar to lai fun but has a tapering end resembling a rat's tail. More commonly known as silver needle noodle in Hong Kong and Taiwan, and rat noodle or "mouse tail noodles" in Malaysia and Singapore and Locupan in Indonesia. They are also known as pin noodles. In Thailand they are known as giam ee noodles.

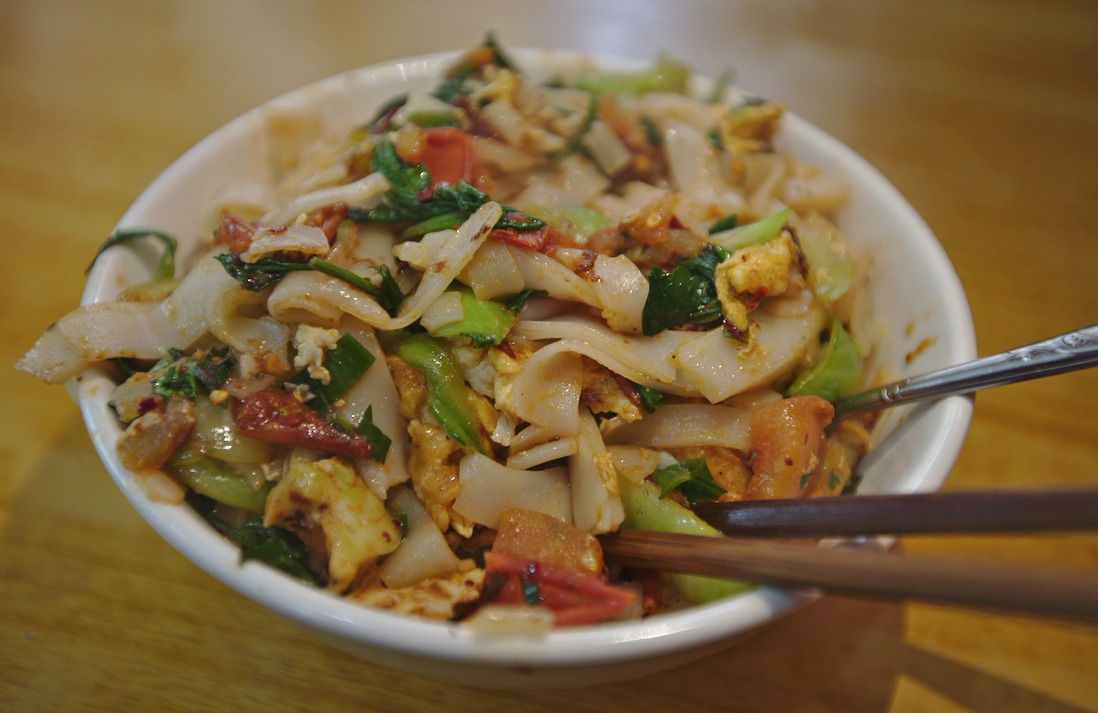
Juanfen

=== Flat thick varieties ===
- Bánh phở – thick fresh rice noodle used in popular Vietnamese phở noodle soups.
- Shahe fen/chao fen/chow fun – wide Chinese noodles made from rice.
- Migan – type of rice noodle from the Dai people, a Tai cultural group from Yunnan Province, China. It is made from ordinary non-glutinous rice. It is primarily defined by its relatively broad and flat shape
- Juanfen – similar to migan
- Sen lek – narrow flat rice noodle in Thailand Used in such dishes as pad thai, Sukhothai rice noodles and in noodle soups.
- Nan byar – flat rice noodles used in Burma byar/pyar means flat.
- San see

=== Thin varieties ===
- Khanom chin – fresh, thin rice noodles in Thai cuisine which are made from rice sometimes fermented for three days, boiled, and then made into noodles by extruding the resulting dough through a sieve into boiling water. Burmese mont bat (မုန့်ဖတ်) or mont di (မုန့်တီ), are similar to this.
- yay sein
- Rice vermicelli – thin form of noodle sometimes referred to as "rice noodles" or "rice sticks"

=== Others ===
- Mixian – a type of rice noodle from the Yunnan Province, China, made from ordinary non-glutinous rice. In many areas there are at least two distinct thicknesses produced, a thinner form (roughly 1.5 mm or 0.059 inches in diameter) and a thicker form (roughly 3.5–4 mm or 0.14–0.16 inches in diameter).

Pasta made from brown rice flour is also available (in health food stores in Western nations) as an alternative to wheat flour-based noodles for individuals who react poorly to gluten.

== Dishes ==
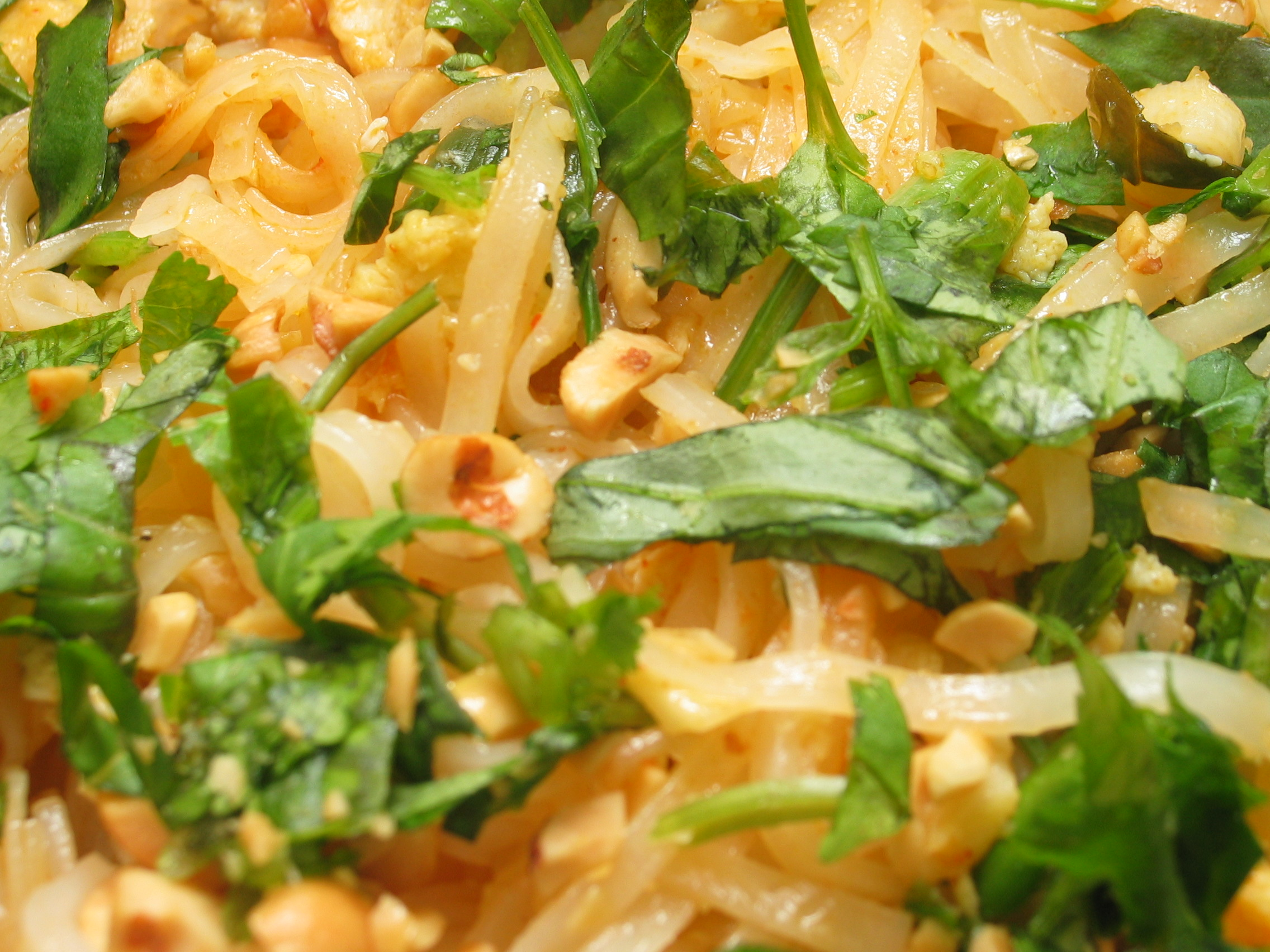
Closeup of pad thai, a Thai dish made from rice noodles

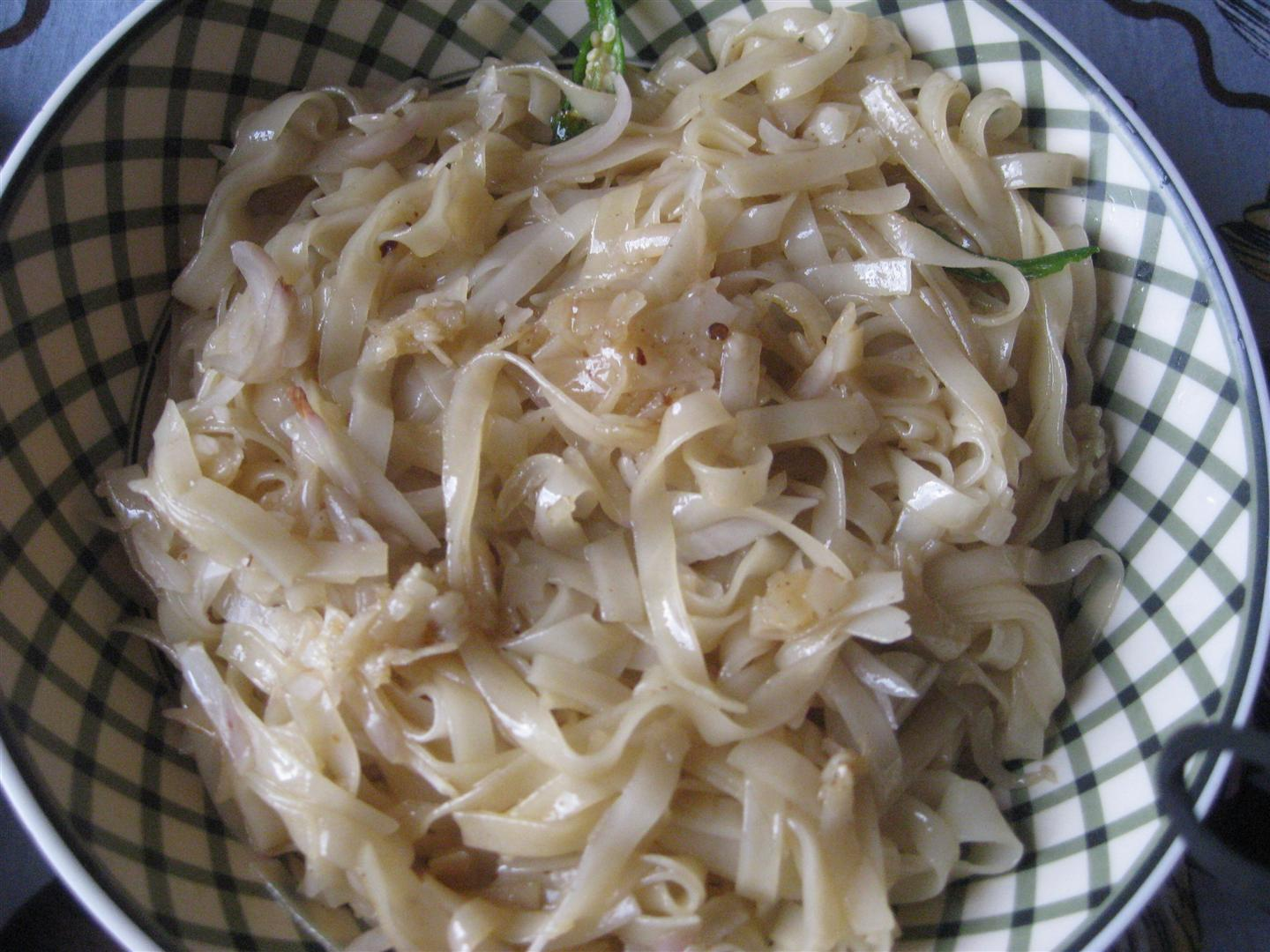
Boiled rice noodles

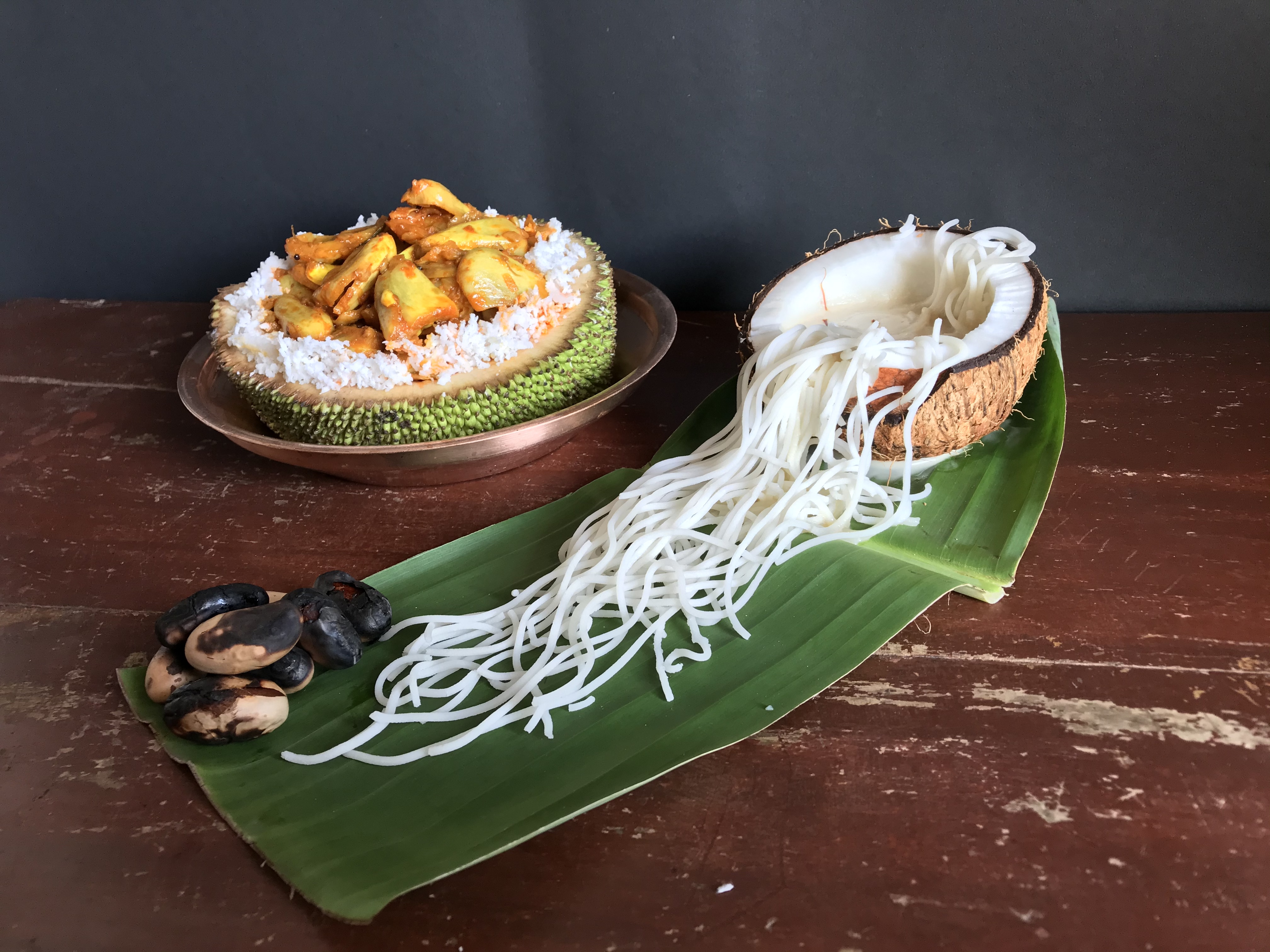
Rice noodles in coconut milk on a plantain leaf, with jackfruit masala.

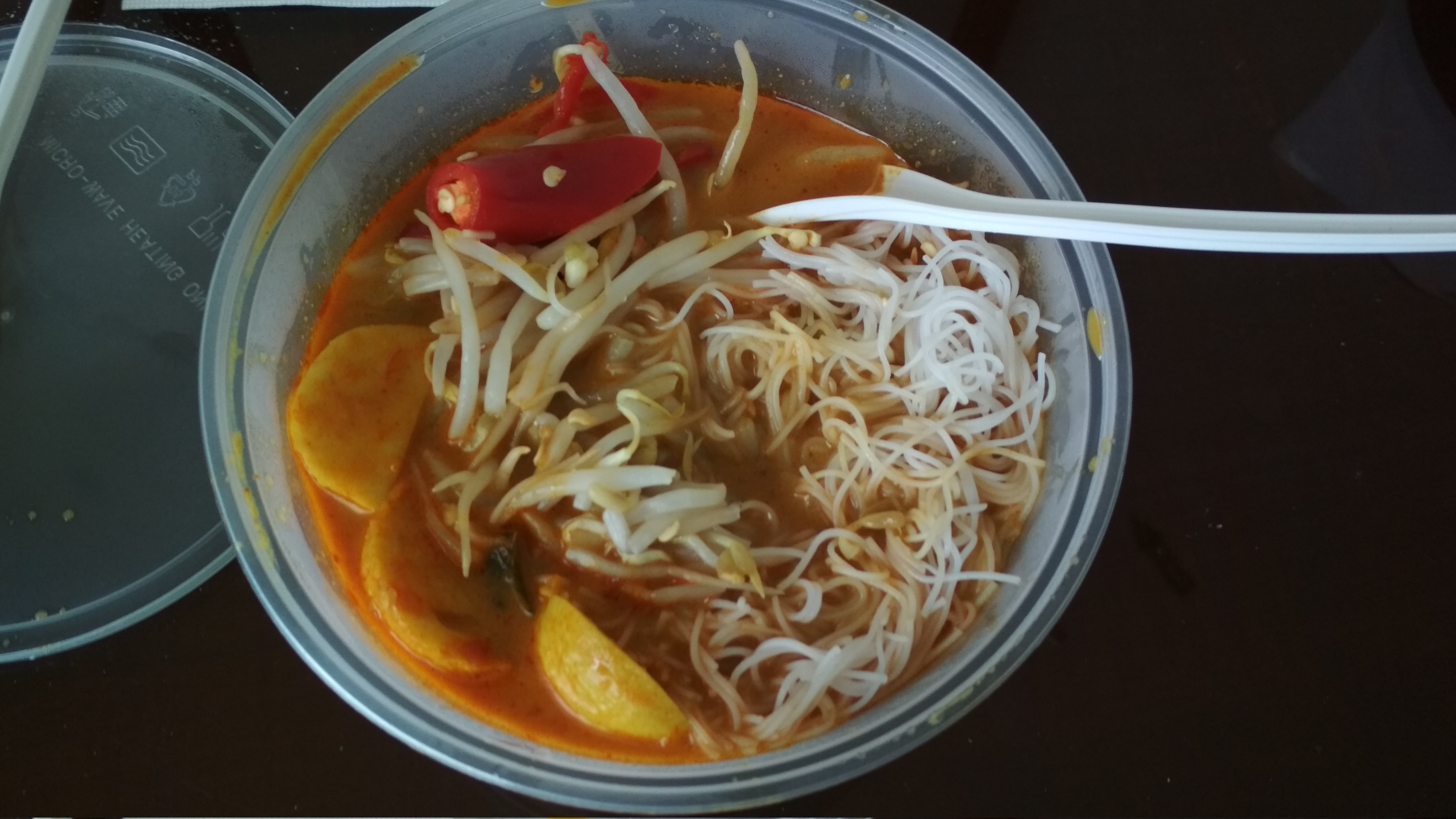
Curry rice noodles served at a hotel in Kajang, Malaysia. The curry noodles contain fish balls, red chillies, mung bean sprouts, tofu, star anise, and cloves.

=== Burmese ===
- Baik kut kyee kaik
- Kat kyi kaik
- Kyar san kyaw
- Kyay oh
- Meeshay
- Mohinga
- Mont di
- Nan gyi thohk
- Nanbyagyi thoke
- Rakhine kyarzan thoke
- Shan khauk swè (similar to Yunnan mi xian) – a "soup version" of meeshay without gel, and fish sauce instead of soy sauce, with flat or round noodles, where the soup is part of the dish itself, rather than as consommé. Also known as Khaut sew or Shan style noodles.

=== Cambodian ===
- Kuyteav
- Num banhchok
- Chha Kuy Teav — stir fried version of Kuyteav soup noodles
- Kŭytéav mii kiəv — Cambodian version of wonton noodle soup
- Mee Katang — Cambodian version of Beef chow fun Unlike the Chinese styled chěo fěn, the noodles are plated under the stir fry beef and vegetables and topped off with scrambled eggs.
- Mee Kola
- Cha Mi Sour
- Lort cha

=== Chinese ===
- Beef chow fun
- Cart noodle
- Chao fen – Also known as chow fun in many Chinese restaurants in North America
- Clay-pot Lao shu fen
- Crossing-the-bridge noodles
- Laoyou rice noodles
- Luosifen
- Mixian (noodle)
- Rice noodle roll
- Singapore-style noodles

=== Filipino ===
- Mami bihon
- Pancit bihon
- Pancit choca
- Pancit luglug
- Pancit Malabon
- Pancit miki-bihon – round egg noodles with bihon, a hybrid type of stir-fried noodle.
- Pancit palabok
- Pancit sinanta – consists of flat egg noodles, bihon, clams and chicken, with broth colored with annatto and served with pinakufu, a variant of dango

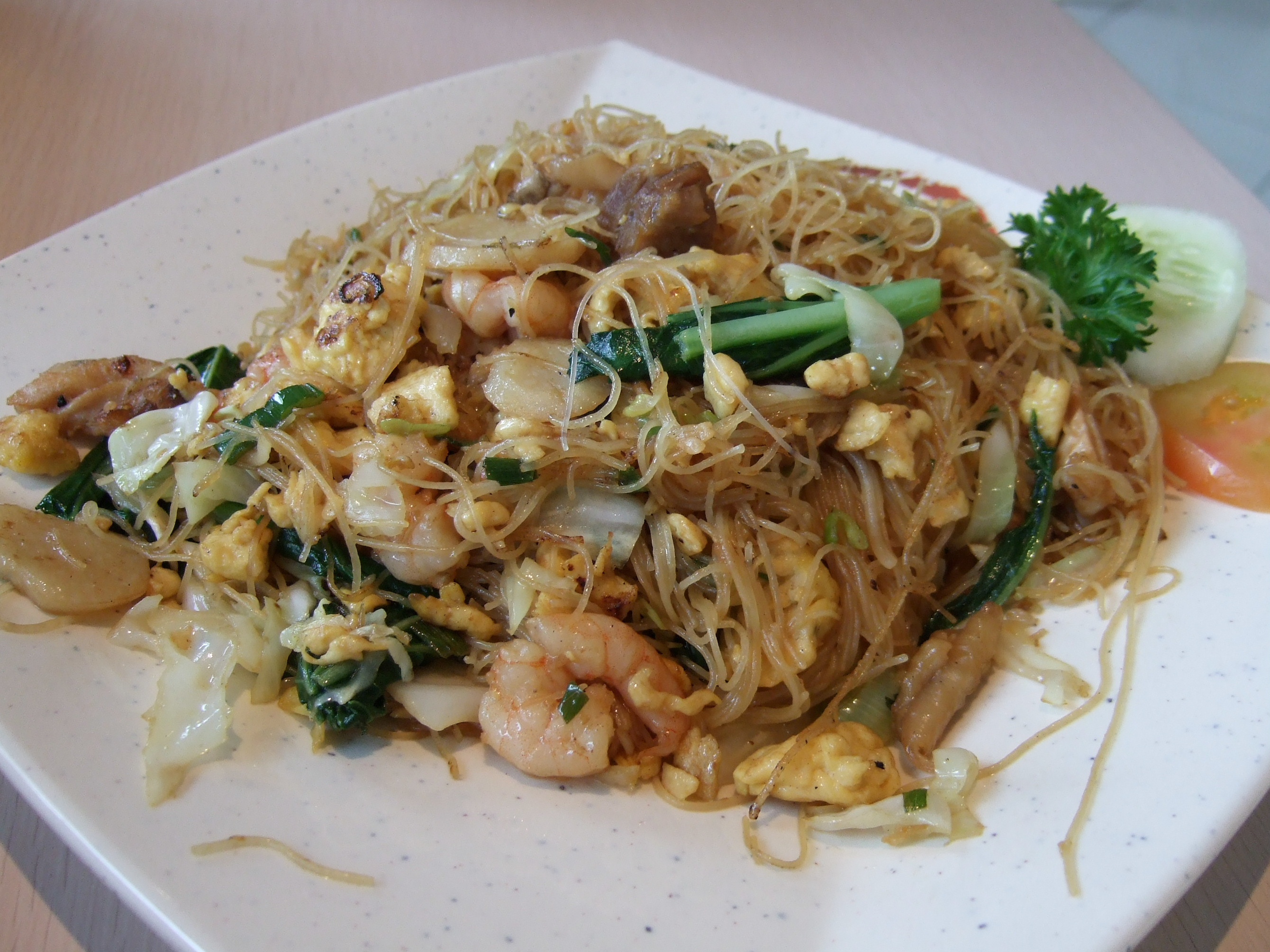
Bihun goreng

=== Indonesian ===
- Bihun
- Bihun goreng
- Bakso
- Ketoprak (dish)
- Kwetiau ayam
- Kwetiau goreng
- Kwetiau kuah
- Kwetiau Medan
- kwetiau sapi
- Lakso
- Soto

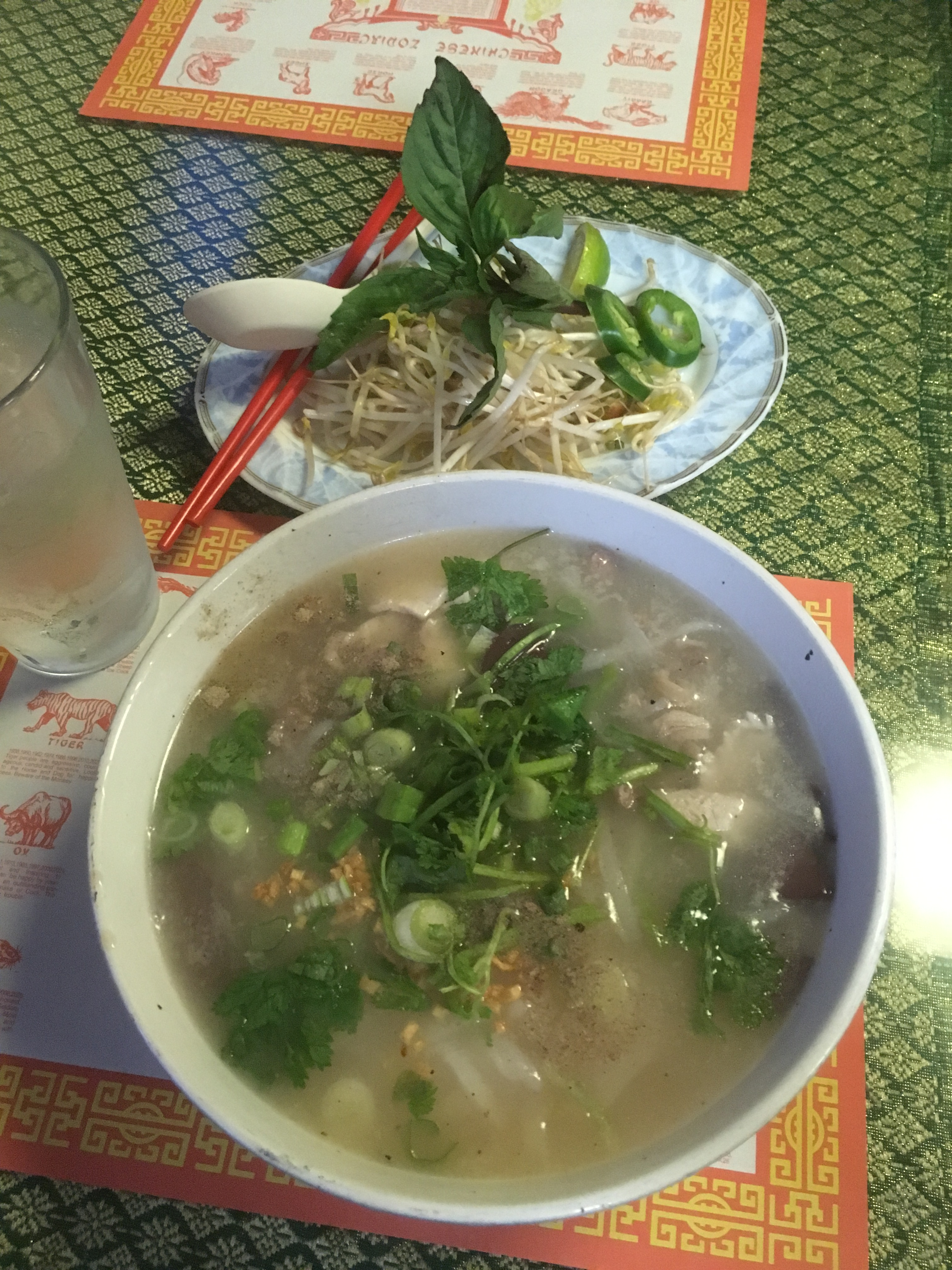
Khao piak sen

=== Lao ===
- Feu
- Khao piak sen
- Khao poon
- Khao soi
- Khua mee or pad lao – stir-fried noodles mixed with lightly scrambled egg. It is the equivalent of pad thai in Thai cuisine.
- Mee ka tee

=== Malaysian ===
- Char kway teow
- Kway chap
- Laksa
- Mee siam

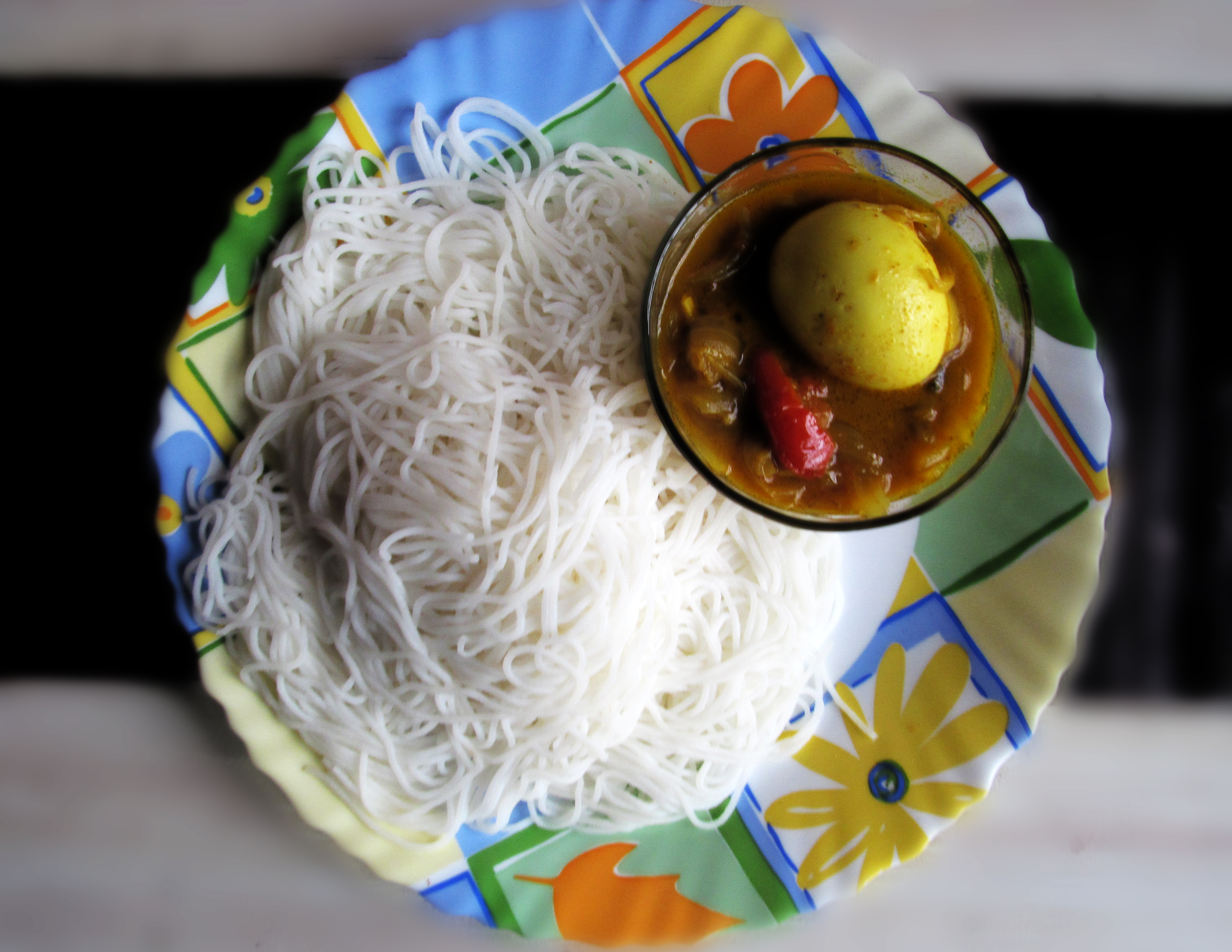
Idiyappam

=== South Indian/Sri Lankan ===
- Idiyappam
- Sevai

=== Singapore ===
- Beef kway teow
- Crab bee hoon
- Hokkien mee
- Katong laksa
- Satay bee hoon

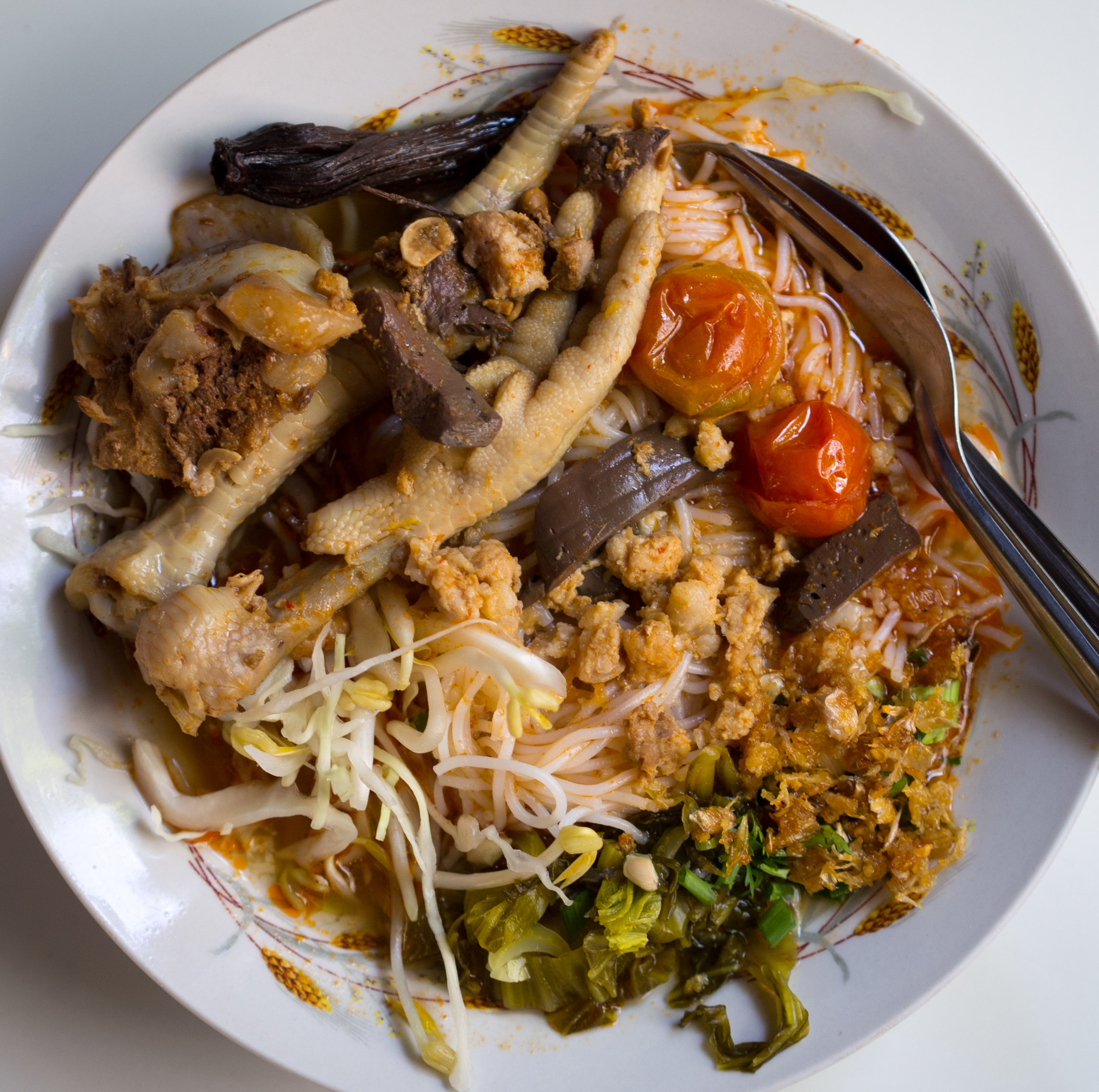
Nam ngiao

=== Thai ===
- Khanom chin
- Khao soi
- Kuai chap – it is a soup of pork broth with rolled up rice noodle sheets (resulting in rolls about the size of Italian penne), pork intestines, "blood tofu", and boiled egg.
- Kuai tiao khua kai
- Kuai tiao nam tok – noodle soup darkened with raw blood
- Kuaitiao ruea, also known as boat noodles
- Mi krop
- Nam ngiao
- Phat khi mao
- Pad thai
- Phat si-io – stir-fried noodles in dark soy sauce
- Rat na – gravy noodles
- Sukhothai rice noodles

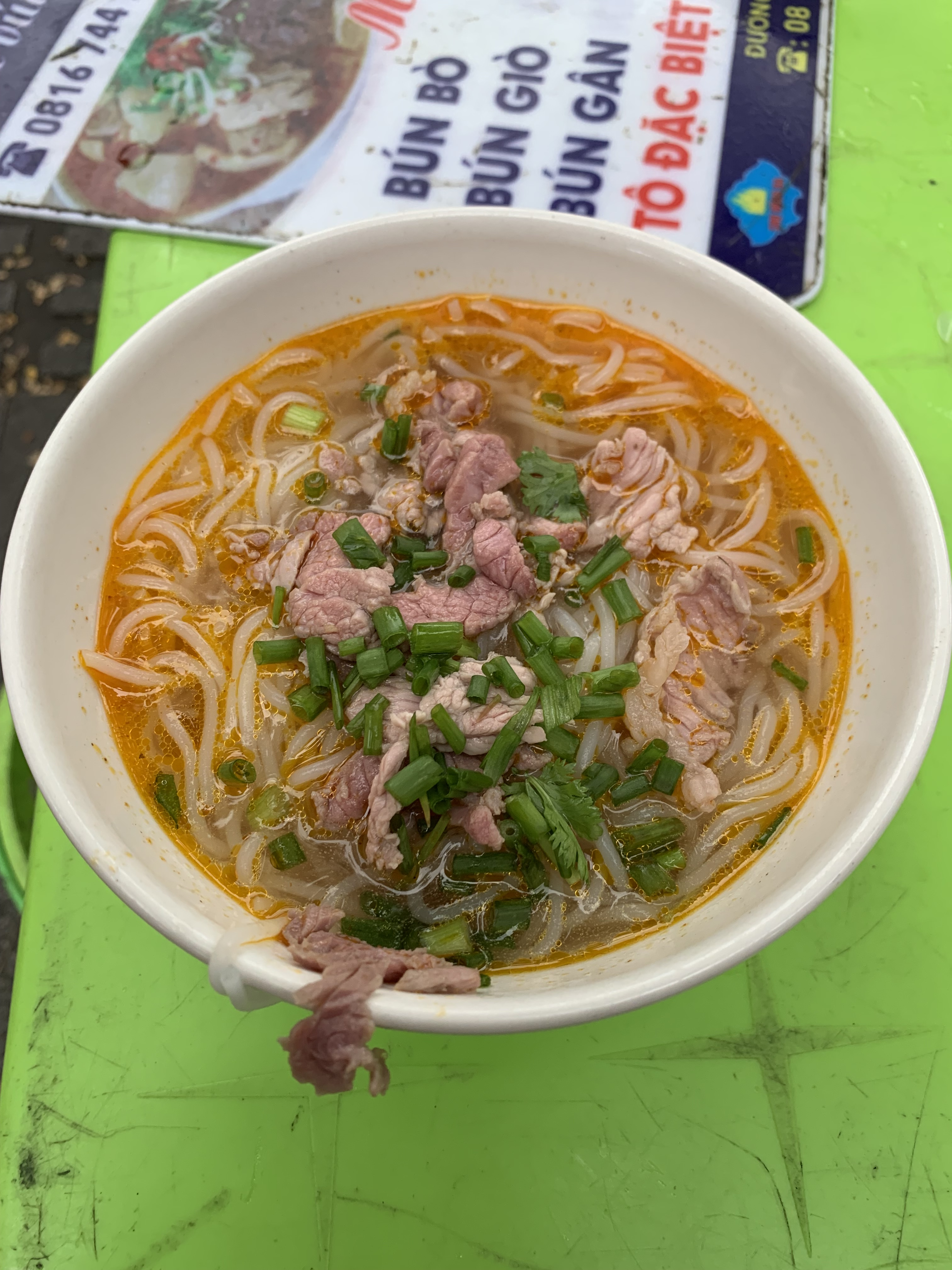
Bún bò Huế

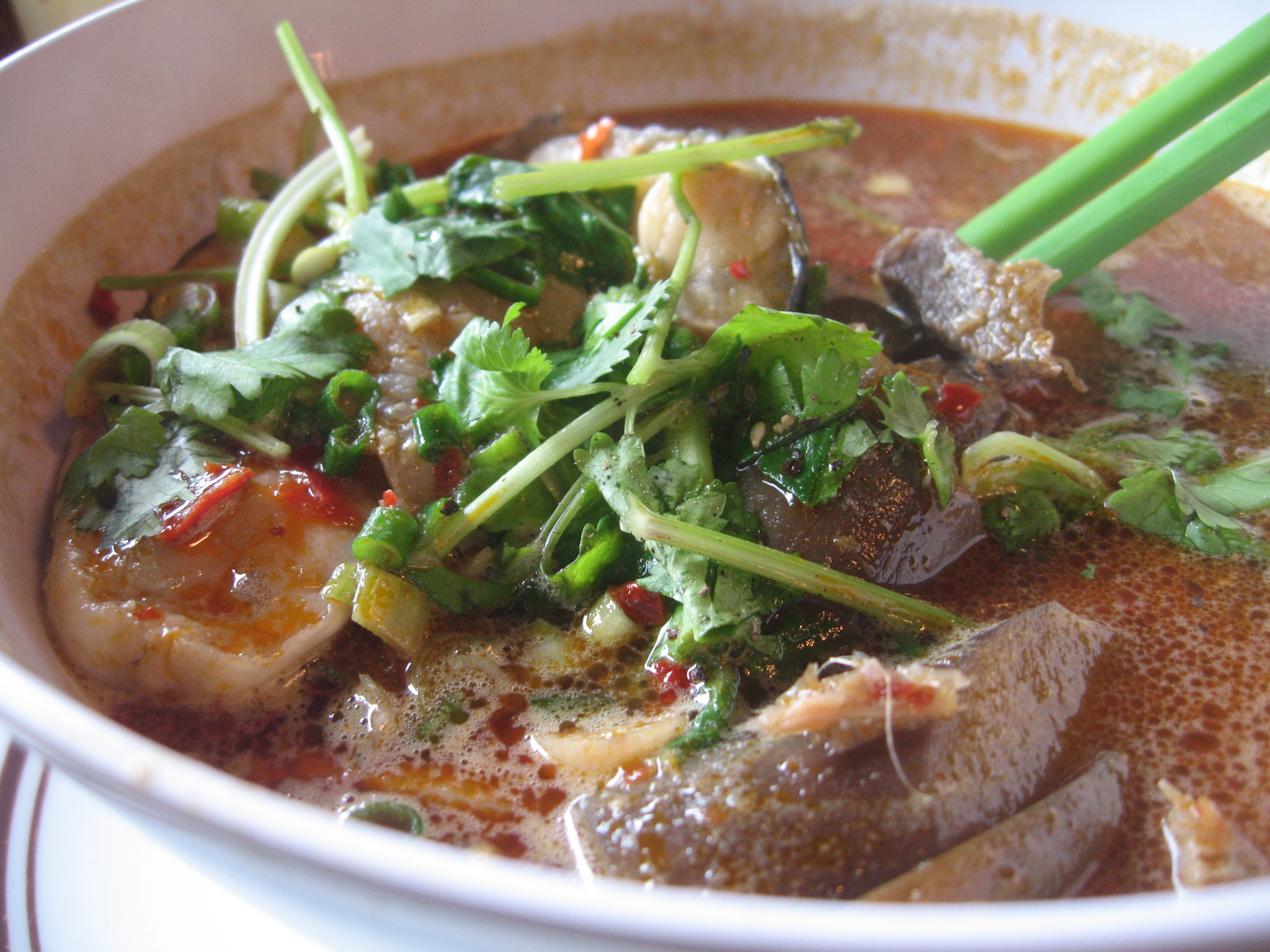
Bún mắm

=== Vietnamese ===
- Bún Cá Rô - Bún is (rice) noodles, Cá is fish, Rô is a type of fresh water fish found in Vietnam
- Bánh canh – Vietnamese soup with thick rice noodles
- Bánh cuốn – sheet of rice flour filled with spiced minced pork and mushroom
- Bánh hỏi
- Bún bò Huế – rice vermicelli in soup with beef, lemon grass and other ingredients
- Bún chả
- Bun Goi Da (Soc Trang Goi Da noodle soup) — "bun" means noodles, "goi" means spring roll, "da" means eating in Vietnamese slang. Its ingredients consist of pork, rice noodles, shrimp, and vegetables. Tamarind sauce adds a sour taste.
- Bún kèn aka trumpet rice noodle soup — A dish (of Cambodian origins) that is a specialty of Phú Quốc.
- Bún mắm
- Bún nước kèn — a speciality of Châu Đốc, in An Giang Province
- Bun Nuoc Leo (Rice Noodle Cooked with Fish Broth)
- Bún ốc
- Bún riêu – rice vermicelli in soup with crab meat
- Bún thịt nướng
- Bún quậy — Stirred(quậy) Shrimp Noodles(Bún). Fish paste and shrimp paste are finely ground, mixed well and stirred. Then, boiling water and noodles water are added immediately and served fresh. Alternatively, the diner has to stir the shrimp, fish, meat, with the broth before eating this dish.
- Cao lầu
- Gỏi cuốn / Summer roll
- Hủ tiếu – A version of kuay teow that became popular in the 1960s in Southern Vietnam, especially in Saigon. There are different types of noodles for Hu Tieu, such as soft rice noodles, egg noodles, or chewy tapioca noodles.
- Mì Quảng
- Miến gà rẫy — chicken rice noodles of Phú Quốc
- Phở

== See also ==
- Vietnamese cuisine
- List of Vietnamese culinary specialities
- Noodle soup
