= Juanfen =

Type of flat rice noodle in China

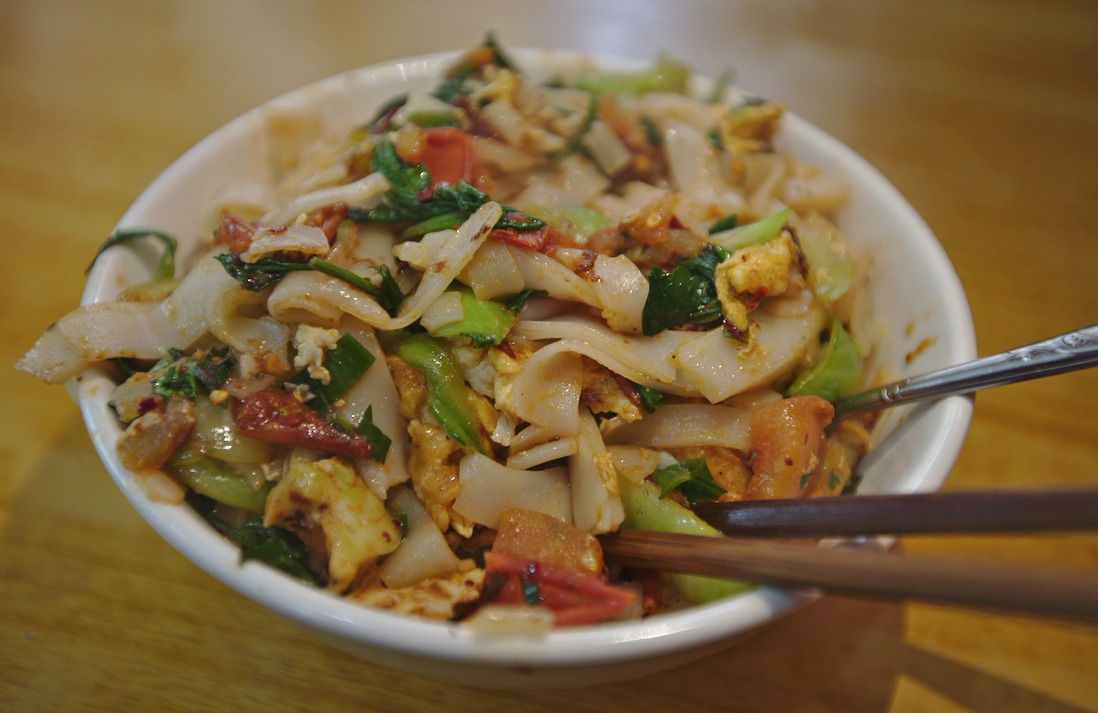
- Stir-fried juanfen noodles, served in Qiubei, Wenshan prefecture, Yunnan province, China
- Type: Chinese noodles
- Place of origin: China
- Created by: Han people
- Main ingredients: Non-glutinous rice
- Other information: Served in broth, or stir fried.

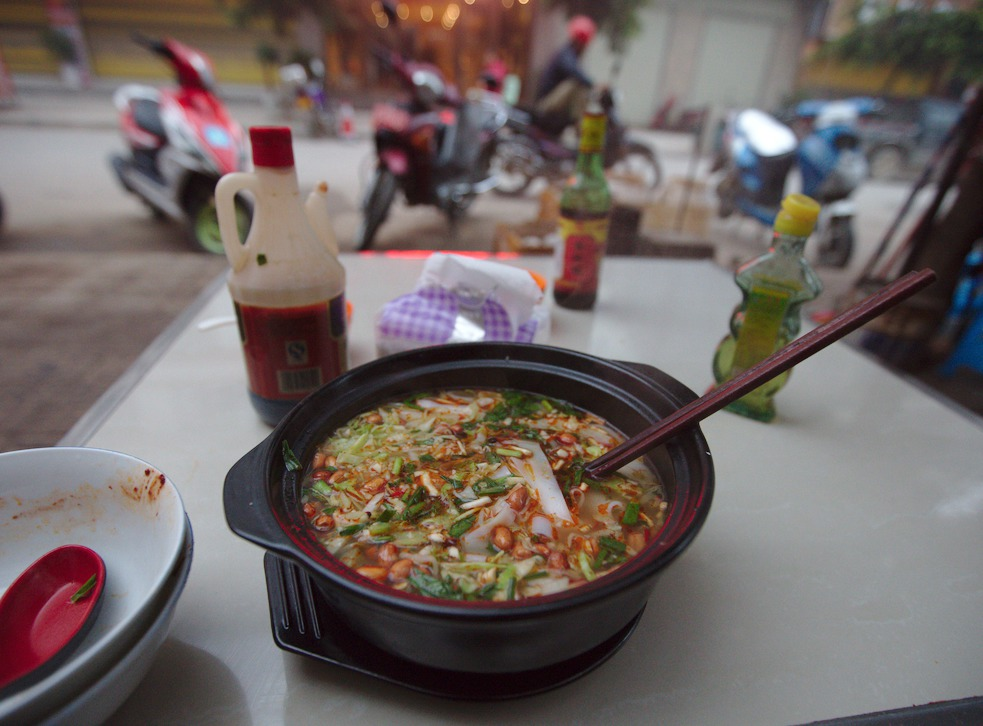
Juanfen noodles in Guangnan County, Wenshan, Yunnan, China

Juanfen (pinyin: juǎnfěn) is a type of flat rice noodle in China. It is made from ordinary non-glutinous rice.

Pictured left is a bowl of juǎnfěn (卷粉) as served 2015-12-01 in Guangnan, Wenshan, Yunnan, China. In addition to a vegetable broth and the noodles themselves, ingredients include lettuce, thinly cut tomato slices, fried peanuts, spring onion, zhe'ergen (a spicy local rhizome), chilli, powdered white pepper, garlic, soy sauce, powdered Sichuan pepper, and Sichuan pepper oil. The location, external seating on stools around a low table at the roadside, is typical of the region and food.

== See also ==
- List of noodles
- Mixian (noodle)
- Rice, History of domestication and cultivation
