= Nan gyi thoke =

Burmese thick rice noodle salad

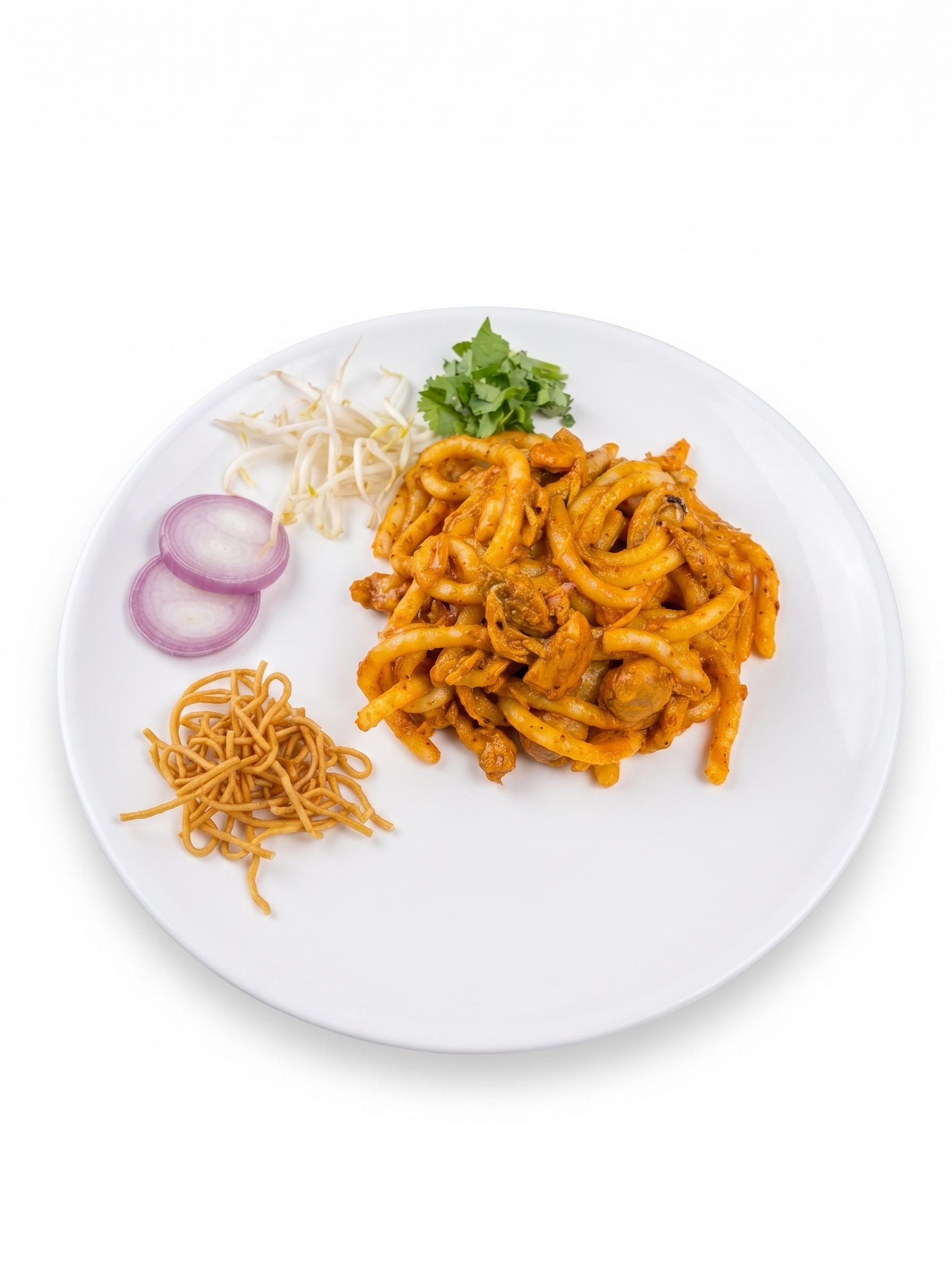
- Nan gyi thoke served with bean sprouts, sliced onion, crispy noodles, and fresh coriander
- Alternative names: Mandalay mont di (မန္တလေးမုန့်တီ)
- Course: Breakfast, lunch, snack
- Place of origin: Mandalay, Myanmar
- Main ingredients: Thick rice noodles, chicken or pork curry, toasted chickpea flour, sliced onions, chilies, crispy noodles, hard-boiled egg slices, lime juice

Nan gyi thoke (Burmese: နန်းကြီးသုပ်‌, pronounced [náɰ̃d͡ʑíθoʊʔ‌]; also spelled nangyi thoke or nangyi thote) is an a thoke salad dish in Burmese cuisine, made with thick round rice noodles mixed with specially prepared chicken curry and chili oil. The dish is garnished with toasted chickpea flour, sliced onions, chilis, crispy noodles, slices of hard-boiled egg, fish cakes, and zested with lime or lemon. The noodle salad originated as a street food from Mandalay.

== Etymology and origins ==
The salad is known by a number of different terms, including nan gyi thoke, nan gyi mont di, and is called Mandalay Mont Di in Yangon. Nan gyi (နန်းကြီး; lit. 'large thread') refers to the thick round rice noodles used in this salad.

The word “nan” refers to the process used by goldsmiths, where gold is pulled into strands of different thicknesses to achieve the desired size. Based on this idea, the dish is called "nan gyi thoke" in Lower Myanmar, while in central and upper regions, it is more commonly known as “mont di thoke.”

== Cultural and regional significance ==
''Nan gyi thoke'' reflects the wider diversity of Myanmar cuisine, which has been influenced by Chinese, Indian, and Southeast Asian culinary traditions. The use of rice noodles in the dish is commonly associated with Chinese culinary influence, while its seasoned chicken- or fish-based curry sauce demonstrates the role of spices in Burmese cooking. Although the dish contains spiced ingredients, its flavor is generally milder than many Indian curries, showing the more balanced and moderate flavor profile often associated with Myanmar cuisine.

'''Nan gyi thoke''' (also known as '''Mandalay mont di''') is a signature dish of Mandalay, Myanmar. It is commonly eaten as a breakfast meal and is widely regarded as one of the city's best-known culinary specialties. The dish is often considered a must-try local food for visitors to Mandalay, reflecting its close association with the city's cultural identity and food heritage.

== Ingredients ==
=== Noodles ===
Nan gyi thoke uses thick, round rice noodles (nan gyi), made from rice flour. The noodles are soft and smooth in texture and do not contain sugar. The dish does not use thin or flat noodle varieties; see the Variations section for regional differences in noodle type.

=== Curry Base ===
The noodles are dressed with a chicken curry sauce prepared with a shredded chicken, peanut oil, ginger, garlic, turmeric, and dried chili. Roasted chickpea flour (pe hmont), also known as bean powder, is used both as a seasoning and as a thickener for the sauce. Turmeric oil and chili oil are also added to the dressing.

=== Garnishes and Condiments ===
Standard garnishes include sliced fish cake, par-boiled bean sprouts, hard-boiled egg, fried shallots, and fresh coriander leaves. Fish sauce and citron juice are added as condiments. The dish is served with a separate bowl of broth and pickled vegetables on the side. Exact garnish choices vary by region; see the Variations section.

== Preparation ==
=== Curry ===
The chicken is first marinated in turmeric and fish sauce, then cooked in peanut oil with blended onion, garlic, ginger, dried chili, and turmeric over high heat until the oil separates from the paste. Shredded chicken is then returned to the pan and coated in the seasoned oil. The oil extracted from this process is reserved separately and used as the primary dressing for the noodles. Roasted chickpea flour (pe hmont) is dry toasted in a separate pan over high heat, stirring continuously until fragrant, then set aside.

=== Noodles ===
The rice noodles are boiled in salted water until soft, then drained and rinsed under cold water to stop the cooking process. A small amount of oil is added after draining to prevent the noodles from sticking together.

=== Assembly ===
The cooked noodles are placed in a bowl and topped with shredded chicken, the reserved curry oil, and roasted chickpea flour. Fish sauce and citron juice are added to season the mixture. The dish is mixed by hand or with utensils until each noodle strand is evenly coated. Garnishes are then placed on top, and the dish is served immediately alongside a separate bowl of broth.

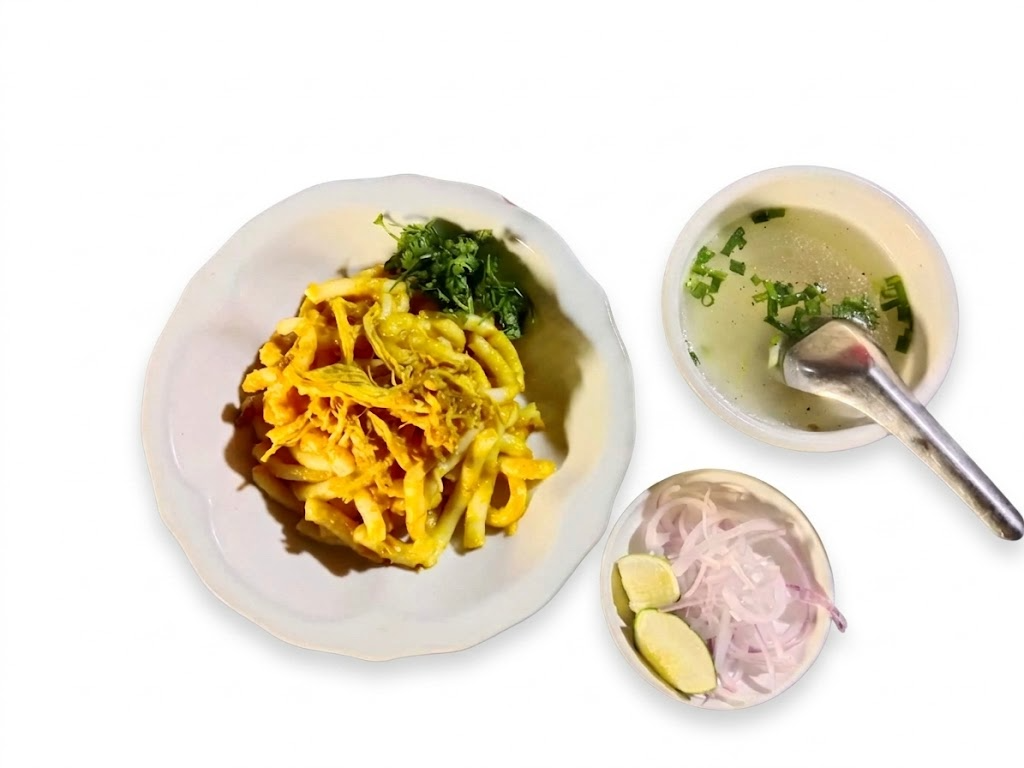
Nan gyi thoke served with broth, sliced onion, and lime

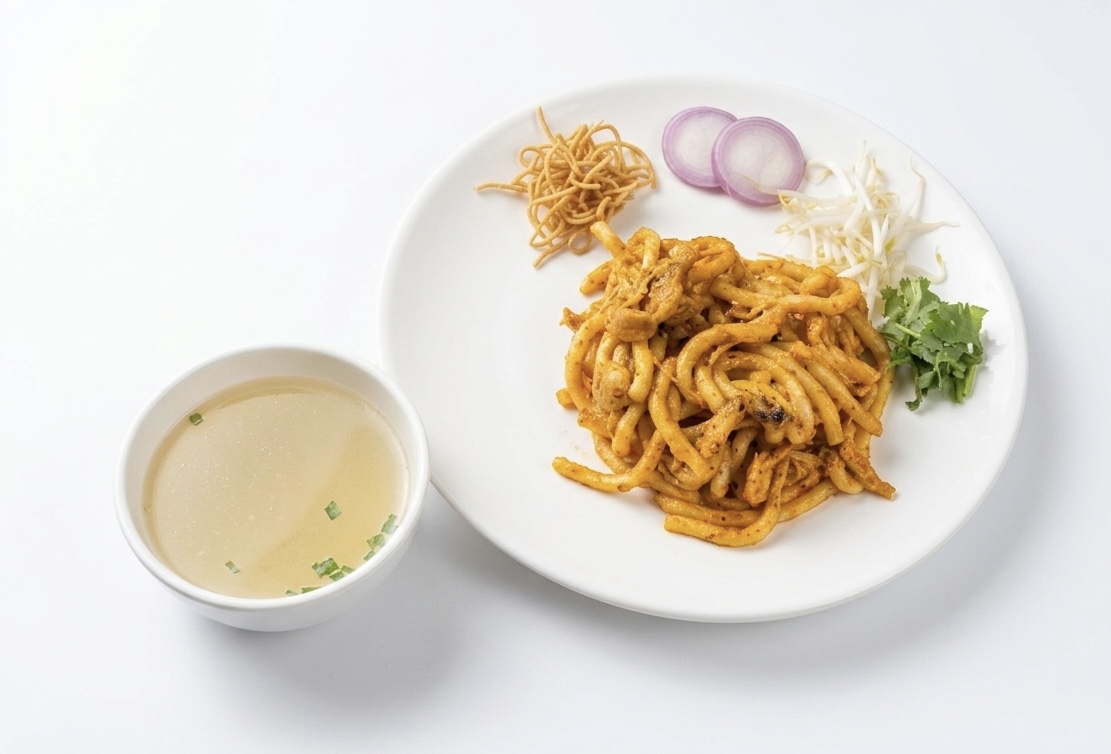
Nan gyi thoke served with a separate bowl of broth

== Variations ==
=== Mandalay Style ===
In central and upper Myanmar, including Mandalay, the dish is commonly known as mont di. In Mandalay, the dish is served with thick round rice noodles (nan gyi), which are the largest of the three noodle sizes available. Authentic Mandalay-style shops typically offer customers a choice of noodle size: nan gyi (large), nan lat (medium), or nan thay (small), and will mix the dish to order. The curry base uses chicken as the main protein. Roasted chickpea flour and its flavoured oils are key components that give the dish its distinct taste. Standard toppings include sliced hard-boiled egg, fish cake, fried shallots, crackers, and fresh coriander. In Mandalay city, a second variety known as Kho Taung (ခိုတောင်) mont di is also served, which uses Kho Taung noodles and whole fish instead of chicken, and is served with clear soup. It is popular not only as a breakfast dish but also as a daytime snack.

=== Yangon Style ===
In Yangon and other lower regions, the medium-sized noodle (nan lat) is more commonly used rather than the thick nan gyi variety. In Yangon, the dish is also referred to as Mandalay mont di. Simply saying mont di in Yangon without specifying may be confused with Rakhine mont di, which is a different dish.

== Vendors and restaurants ==
Nan gyi thoke is served by roaming street vendors, at fixed stalls, and at well-known restaurants, with each establishment preparing it in its own style. Vendors carry all required ingredients, broth, and serving equipment, traveling around markets, street corners, and areas near schools to serve customers on the spot. Some tea shops in Mandalay have also begun offering the dish. Diners may eat at the stall where the dish is mixed by hand to order, or take it away to eat at home.

== See also ==
- Burmese cuisine
- List of salads
- Meeshay
- Ohn no khao swe
- Mont di
