= Kat kyi kaik =

Noodle dish from Myanmar

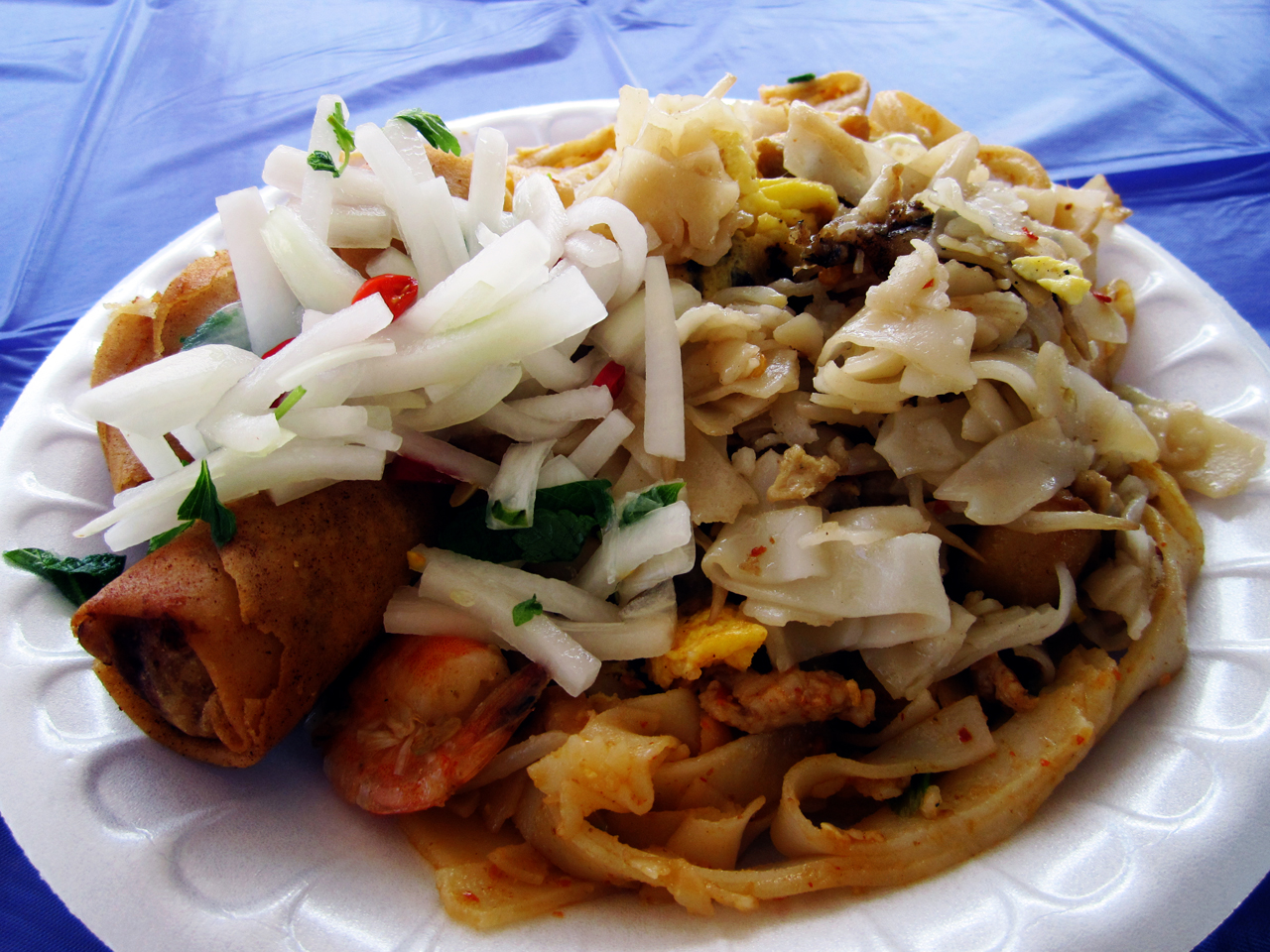
- Course: Snack
- Place of origin: Myanmar
- Region or state: Myeik
- Main ingredients: Wide rice noodles, bean sprout, squid, prawns, steamed garden pea, chili, pepper, spring onion, dark soy sauce

Kat kyi kaik (Burmese: ကတ်ကြေးကိုက်; pronounced [kaʔt͡ɕíkaɪʔ]), also specifically called Myeik kat kyi kaik (မြိတ်ကတ်ကြေးကိုက်), is a spicy Burmese fried noodle dish associated with the coastal town of Myeik (formerly Mergui) in Southern Myanmar.

It consists of wide, flat rice noodles fried with squid slices, bean sprouts, prawns, steamed garden pea (pe byok), spring onion, pepper and dark soy sauce. It is popular locally, where it is found in the Southern coastal region of Myanmar and in Yangon.

The dish gets the name kat kyi kaik (lit. 'scissor-bitten') because while the noodles and ingredients are being fried in a wok, the cook uses scissors to cut up the noodles for easier cooking and serving.

A comparable dish is char kway teow, a popular dish in Singapore and Malaysia. Beik kut kyee kaik only uses prawns and squid as main ingredients.

== See also ==
- Meeshay - a rice noodle dish associated with Shan State in Eastern Myanmar
- Mont di - a rice noodle dish associated with the entirety of Myanmar
- Char kway teow - a rice noodle dish associated with southeast Asia
