= Khanom chin =

Thai rice noodles

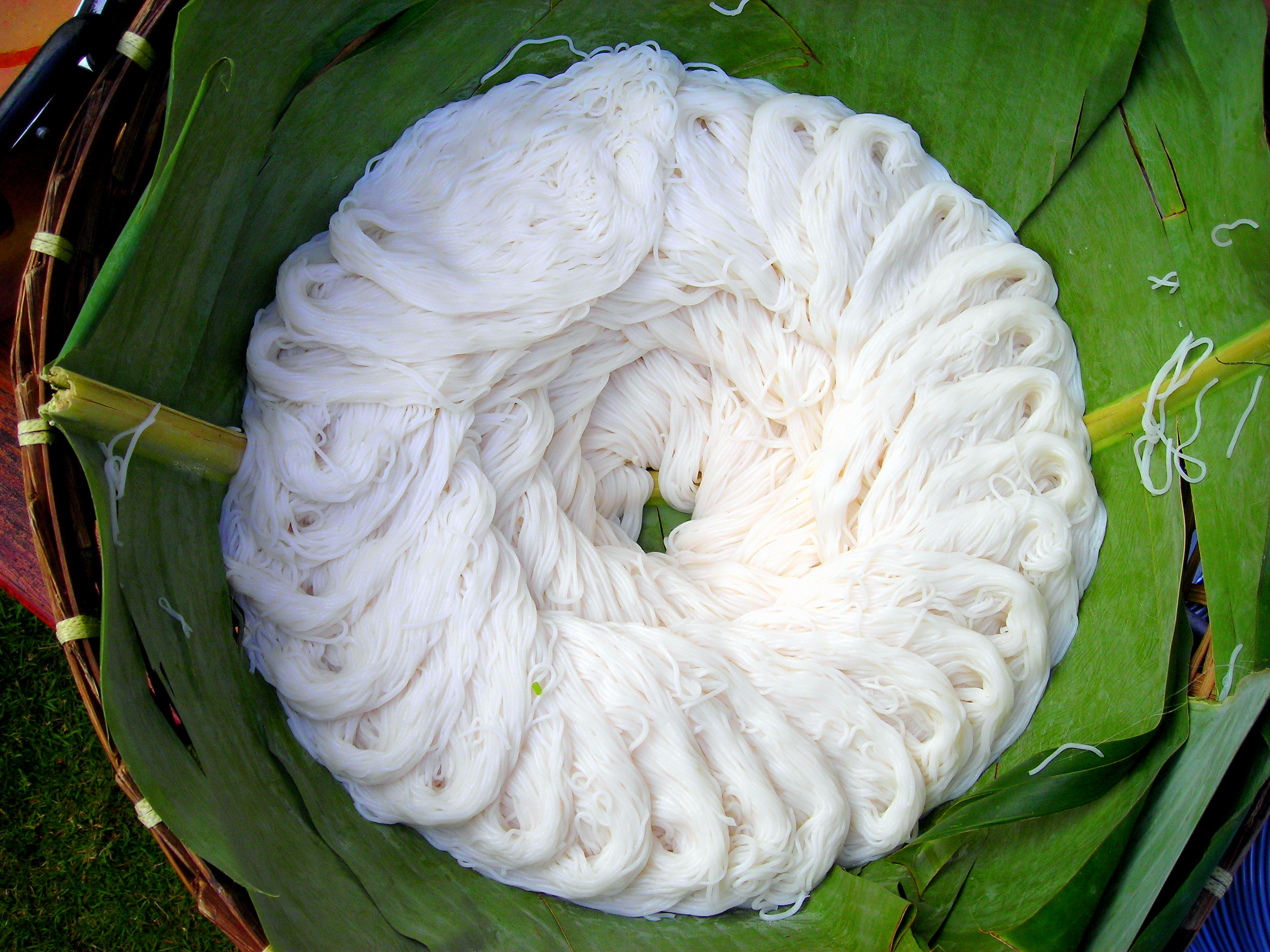
- Fresh batch of khanom chin
- Alternative names: khanom jeen
- Type: Rice noodles
- Place of origin: Thailand
- Region or state: Central Thailand
- Created by: Mon people
- Main ingredients: Rice
- Similar dishes: mont di, Mohinga, mixian, num banhchok, bún, khao poon

Khanom chin or khanom jeen (Note: Thai: ขนมจีน, pronounced [kʰā.nǒm tɕīːn]; Northeastern Thai: ข้าวปุ้น, pronounced [kʰà(ː)w pûn]; Northern Thai: ขนมเส้น, pronounced [kʰā.nǒm se᷇n]) are fresh, thin white rice noodles in Thai cuisine which are made from rice fermented for three days, boiled, and extruded through into boiling water through a sieve. Khanom chin is served with stocks including coconut milk, fish curry, and chilli.

== Etymology and origin ==
Although chin means "Chinese" in Thai, this type of noodle originated from the Mon people. The word khanom chin is probably derived from the Mon words hanom cin (Mon: ခၞံစိန် lit. 'boiled noodles').

== Eating khanom chin ==
When khanom chin is served, the stock is added. Each locality has a different stock such as coconut stock, fish, curry sauce, chili sauce, and curry with coconut milk such as green curry, spicy pork sauce, and fish organ sour soup. Moreover, for children, there is also a sweet stock without spices combined with nuts.

Khanom chin is eaten with fresh vegetables and pickles as condiments: in the north, pickled cabbage and raw sprouts are typical; in the central regions, banana blossoms, lentils, cucumbers, sprouts, raw papaya, basil, gotu kola, bitter melon and morning glory (other condiments can include half-boiled eggs and roasted peppers); in the northeast, fresh vegetables such as white popinac, climbing wattle and parsley; in the south, fresh vegetables such as parkia, white popinac, olives and pickles.

Notable neighborhoods for khanom chin in Bangkok include Banglampoo in Phra Nakhon (with two eateries) and Wongwian Yai in Thonburi.

== Variations ==
There are two types of khanom chin noodles:

- Khanom chin noodles made with fermented flour, usually made in the northeast. The brown noodle is stickier than fresh flour and can keep for a long time. This is the ancient method of khanom chin making.
- Khanom chin noodles made with fresh flour. The noodles are bigger than fermented flour and softer too. Khanom chin noodle is white and easy to make.

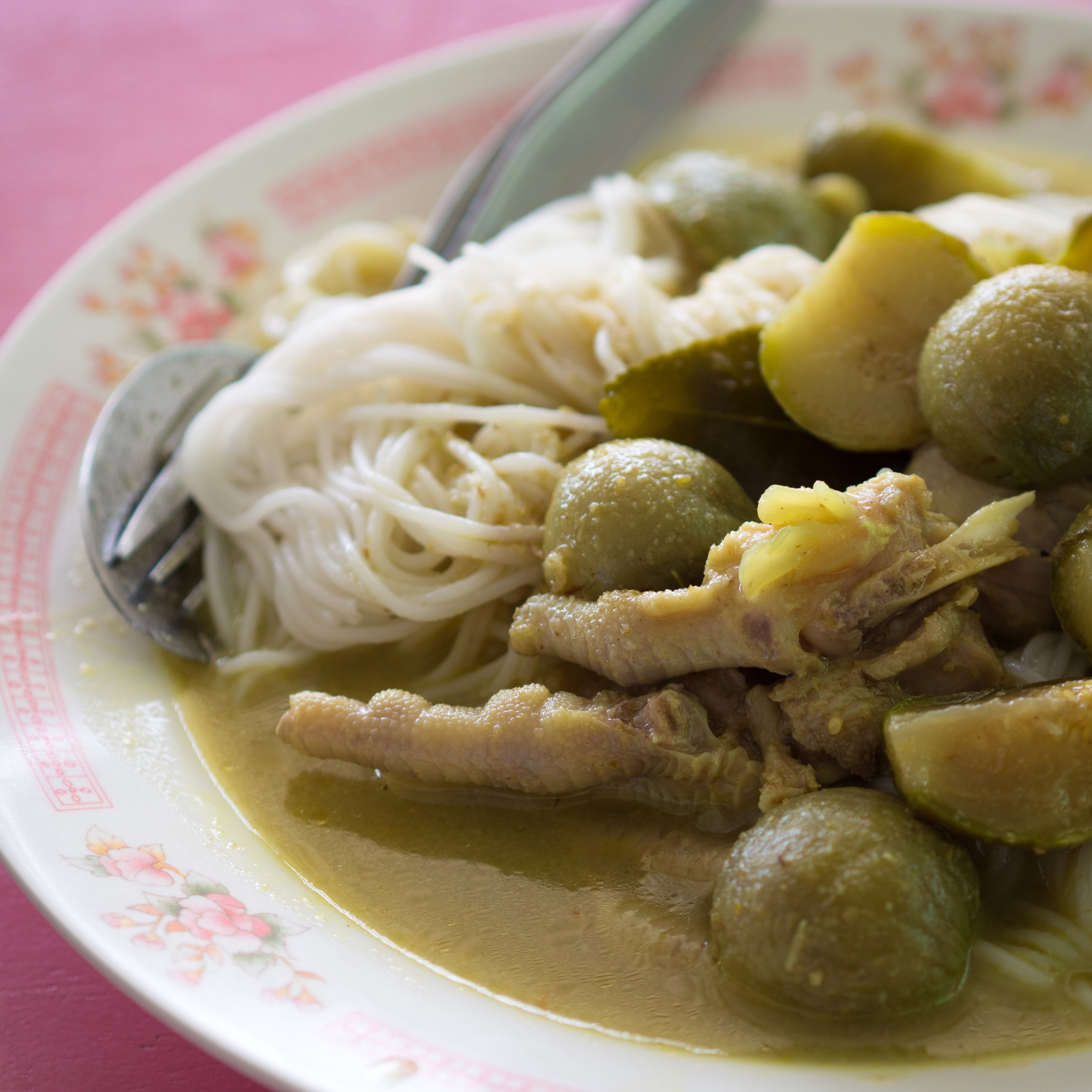
Khanom chin kaeng khiao wan kai

These noodles are used as a staple food in a variety of Thai dishes. Some popular dishes are:

- Khanom chin nam ya, served with a hot and spicy fish-based sauce
- Khanom chin nam phrik, served with a sweet peanut-based sauce
- Khanom chin kaeng kiao wan kai, served with green chicken curry
- Khanom chin nam ngiao, a northern Thai speciality, the sauce contains pork blood
- Khanom chin sao nam, a salad with coconut milk, ground sun-dried prawns, and fresh pineapple
- Khanom chin tai pla, a southern Thai spicy soup
- Khanom chin miang pla, noodles with deep fried fish and spicy chili sauce wrapped in a big salad leaf

Another popular combination is to serve Thai papaya salad together with this noodle.

=== Khanom chin nam ya ===
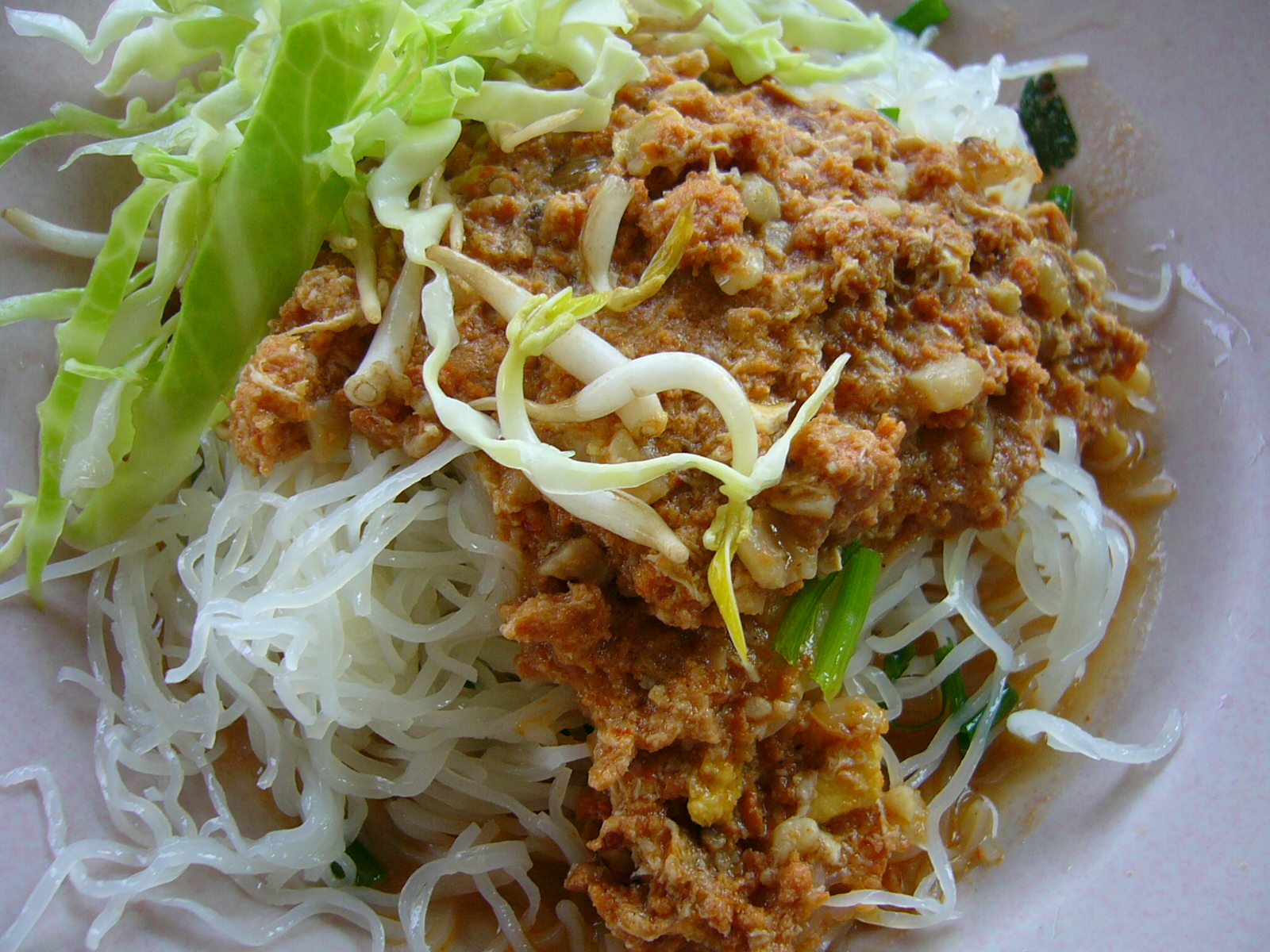
Khanom chin nam ya

Khanom chin nam ya (lit. 'noodles with fish curry') is spicy like many other dishes in Thai cuisine, such as Tomyamkung, Somtum, and yum. Nam ya (English: fish curry) originates from Central Thailand. The ingredients of khanom chin nam ya include khanom chin, boiled fish, fish ball, dried guinea pepper, salt, kha sliced, lemongrass sliced, garlic sliced, turmeric sliced, fingerroot, shrimp paste, shallots, undiluted coconut milk, diluted coconut milk, fish sauce, palm sugar, noodles, boiled egg and fresh vegetables. First, the dried guinea pepper, salt, kha, lemongrass, shallots, garlic, fingerroot and turmeric is pounded until it breaks, then boiled fish and shrimp paste are added and pounding is continued. Second, the coconut milk is boiled by using middle temperature, then the spices in the first step, when the coconut milk is boiling, then input fish ball and season. Lastly, khanom chin is added to the dish and fish curry is poured over the dish, it is eaten with boiled egg and fresh vegetables.

=== Khanom chin nam ngiao ===
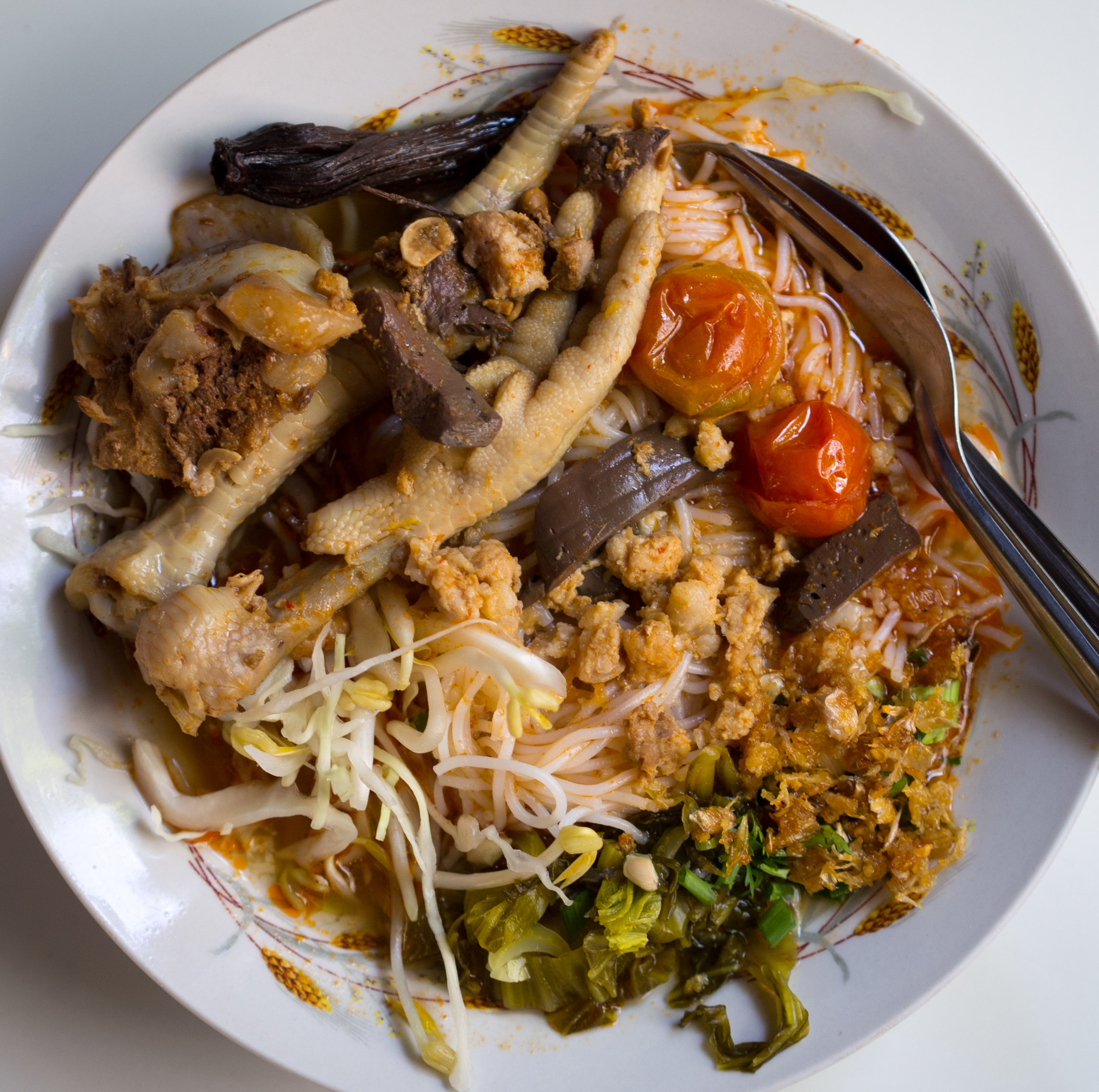
Khanom chin nam ngiao

Khanom chin nam ngiao is a noodle soup or curry of the cuisine of the Tai Yai people who live in the northeast of Myanmar, the southwest of Yunnan province, China, and in northern Thailand, mainly in Mae Hong Son Province. The dish has become famous through the northern Thai cuisine. Nam ngiao has a spicy and tangy flavor.

=== Khanom chin kai khua ===
Khanom chin kai khua (lit. 'noodles with stir-fried chicken') is similar to the khanom chin nam ya. However, there is a difference in ingredients used minced chicken served with fried chili oil, chicken blood pudding, chopped onion and coriander. The dish is considered a rare food, it is made and sold only two places are Kudi Chin, which was a small community of Thai Portuguese located at the Chao Phraya River bank near Santa Cruz Church in Thonburi neighborhood, and the Ban Yuan near Immaculate Conception Church in Samsen neighborhood, which was community of Roman Catholic Thai Vietnamese. Assumed that it originated from the Portuguese spaghetti white sauce. It is also called Khanom chin Portugal (although, some academics believe that it originated from Khmer cuisine).

=== Khanom chin Pradok ===
Khanom chin Pradok or Khanom chin Ban Pradok is eaten in Nakhon Ratchasima Province or Korat. It is served with curry. Ban Pradok is a muban (village in Thai) in Muen Wai Sub-District, Mueang Nakhon Ratchasima District, Nakhon Ratchasima Province. Restaurants serving the dish in the village are concentrated around the Ban Khok Phai area. The noodles are also served with other dishes such as phat mi Khorat, som tam, kai yang, and desserts.

=== Khanom chin Lom Sak ===
Khanom chin Lom Sak are noodles of Lom Sak District, Phetchabun Province, northern Thailand. Local people here are very fond of eating noodles, because their ancestors are of Lao descent. It is said that they eat three main meals per day. There are a lot of restaurants lining the roads. Rice noodles here are colorful, made from various herbs, it is unique not like other noodles.

== Similar dishes ==
Similar noodles are also found in other cuisines: mont di from Burmese cuisine; mixian is from Yunnan Province, China; num banhchok from Cambodia; and bún from Vietnam. It also bears similarities to idiyappam, a rice noodle dish eaten in the southern Indian states of Tamil Nadu and Kerala and also eaten in Sri Lanka, Malaysia, Singapore and Indonesia.

== See also ==
- List of Thai dishes
- List of Thai ingredients
- Rice noodles
  - Rice vermicelli
