= Kuaitiao khua kai =

Thai dish with noodles and chicken

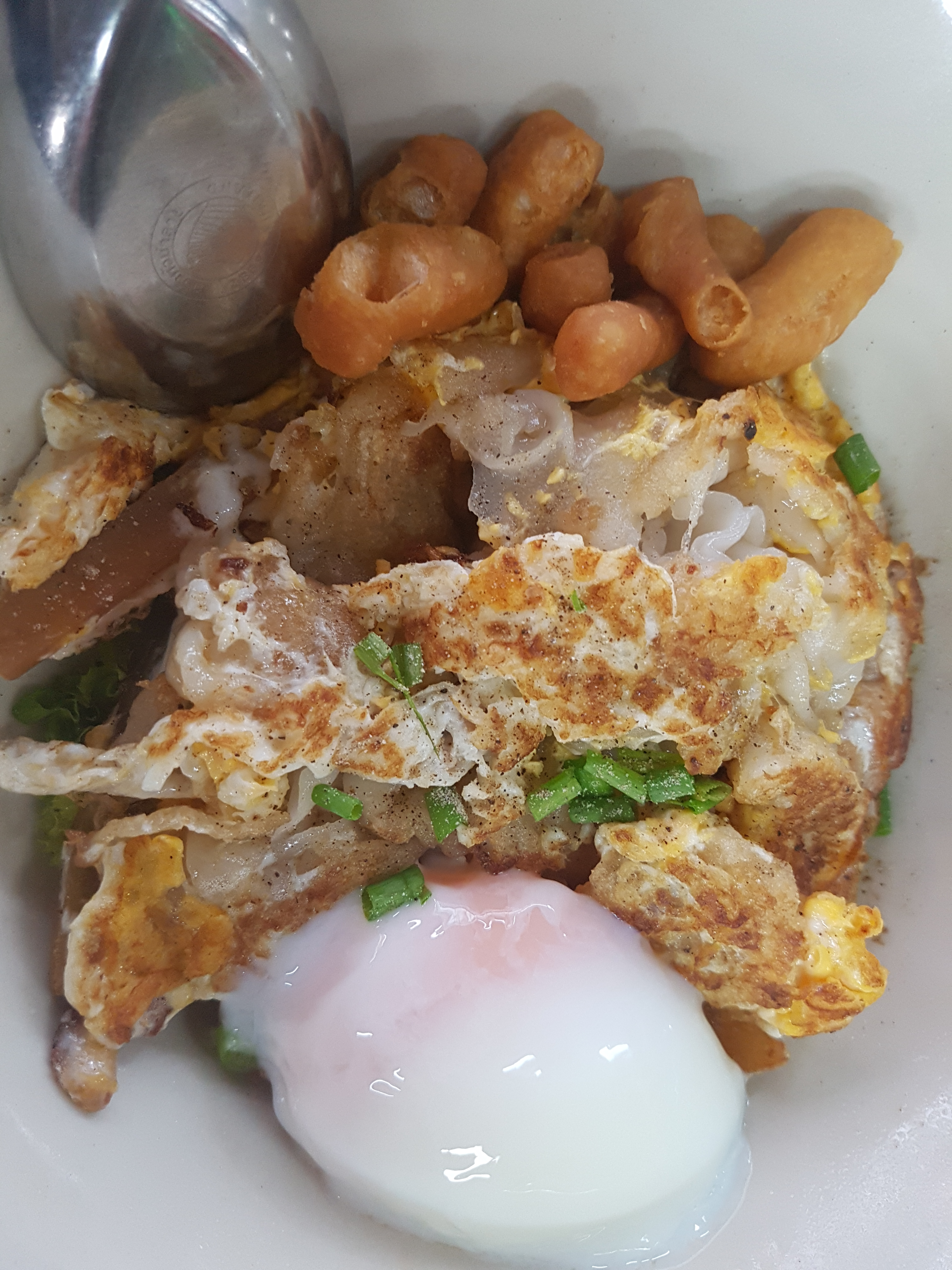
- Kuaitiao khua kai served with a poached egg and deep-fried dough sticks
- Alternative names: Khua kai
- Type: Rice noodles
- Place of origin: Thailand
- Serving temperature: Hot
- Main ingredients: Rice noodles, chicken, eggs, squid, lettuce

Kuaitiao khua kai (Thai: ก๋วยเตี๋ยวคั่วไก่, pronounced [kǔaj.tǐaw kʰûa kàj]) is a popular Chinese-influenced Thai dish made with stir-fried rice noodles (ก๋วยเตี๋ยว, kuaitiao) and chicken. The recipe for kuaitiao was later changed by Thais to dried noodles with chicken, whence came its modern Thai name.

Kuaitiao khua kai is normally served as soaked dried rice noodles stirred with a simple combination of ingredients, such as chicken, squid, and lettuce. Other optional ingredients include sliced tomatoes, eggs, deep-fried dough sticks, garlic, and spring onion. It is seasoned with oyster sauce, light soy sauce, and fish sauce. It also may be seasoned with sauce prik, chili flakes, vinegar, sugar, and tangy tomato sauce. A special way to make kuaitiao khua kai is to spread it on top of lettuce.

It is said that kuaitiao khua kai originated from chicken congee without stock in the Talat Noi neighborhood before the World War II period by overseas Chinese. It is very popular, especially with young women, so it was adapted into noodles.

The notable kuaitiao khua kai eateries in Bangkok are in the Suan Mali neighborhood near Hua Lamphong railway station, and the Phlapphla Chai neighborhood near Bangkok Metropolitan Administration General Hospital in the Yaowarat (Bangkok Chinatown) area. In another places such Ban Poon neighborhood in Bang Plad under the Rama VIII bridge in Thonburi side and Luk Luang road along the Khlong Phadung Krung Kasem near Talat Nang Loeng and the Government House etc.
