= Bánh canh =

Vietnamese soup with thick rice noodles

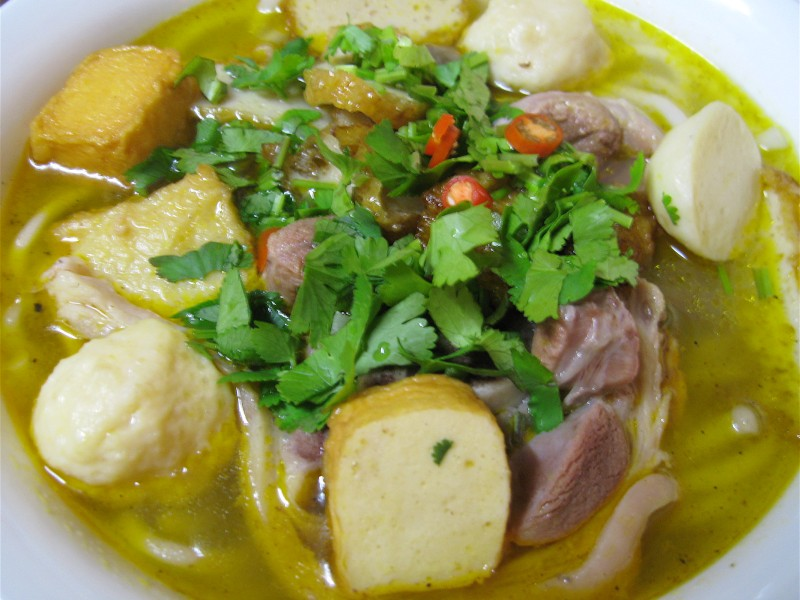
- Bánh canh with pork, fish balls, prawn cakes and fried tofu
- Type: Soup
- Place of origin: Vietnam
- Region or state: Southeast Asia
- Main ingredients: Tapioca flour, optionally rice flour

Bánh canh (Vietnamese: [ɓaɲ kaɲ]) are thick Vietnamese noodles that can be made from tapioca flour or a mixture of rice and tapioca flour.

- Bánh canh cua – a rich, thick crab soup, often with the addition of quail eggs.
- Bánh canh bột lọc – a more translucent and chewy version of the noodle.
- Bánh canh chả cá – the dish includes fish cake and is popular in South Central Vietnam.
- Bánh canh giò heo tôm thịt – includes pork knuckles and shrimp.
- Bánh canh Trảng Bàng – bánh canh made in the southeastern Vietnamese town of Trảng Bàng, served with boiled pork, tapioca noodles, and local herbs.
- Bánh canh tôm – a shrimp-flavoured broth that is also mixed with coconut milk.

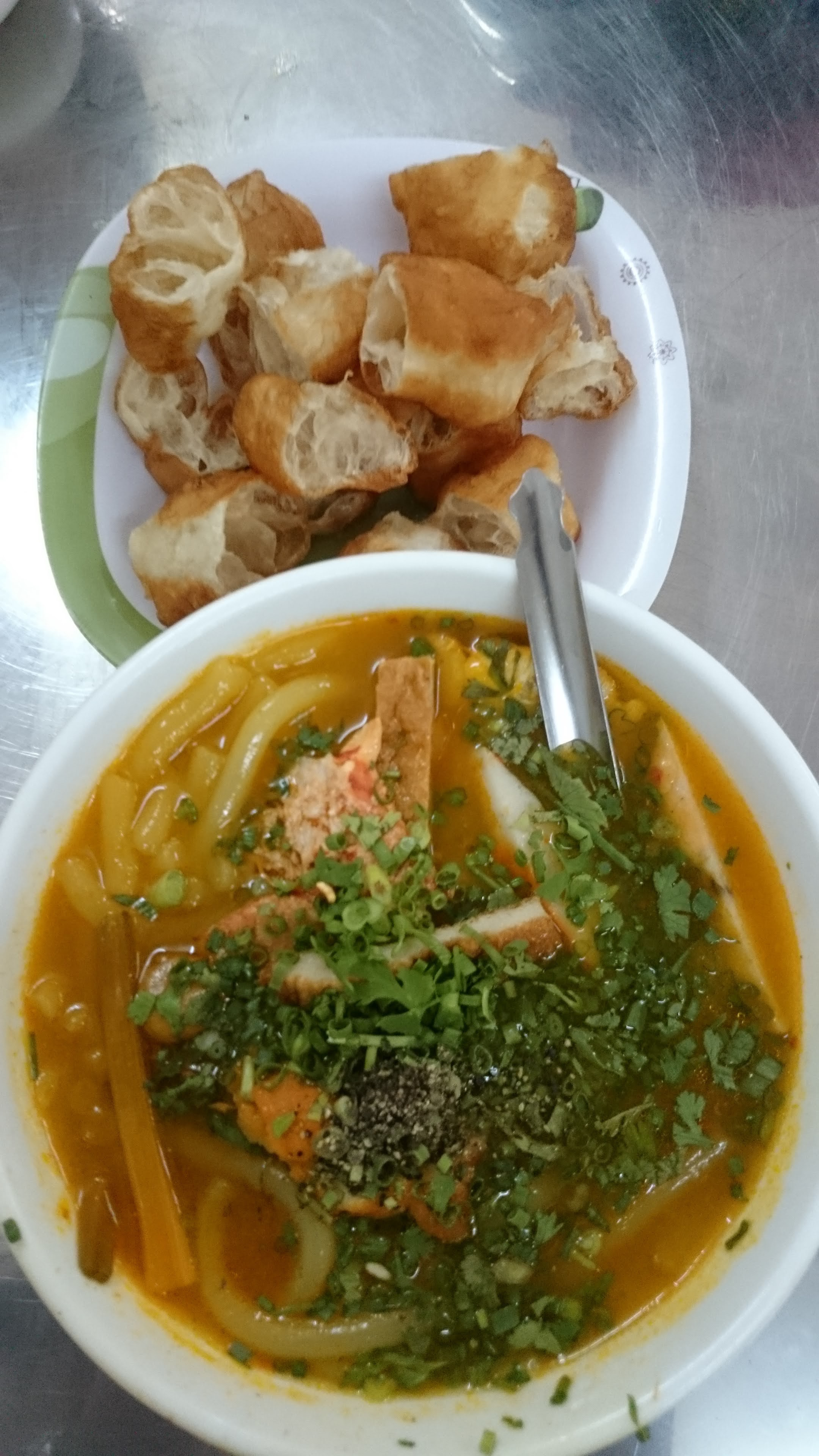
A bowl of bánh canh cua (bánh canh with crab soup).

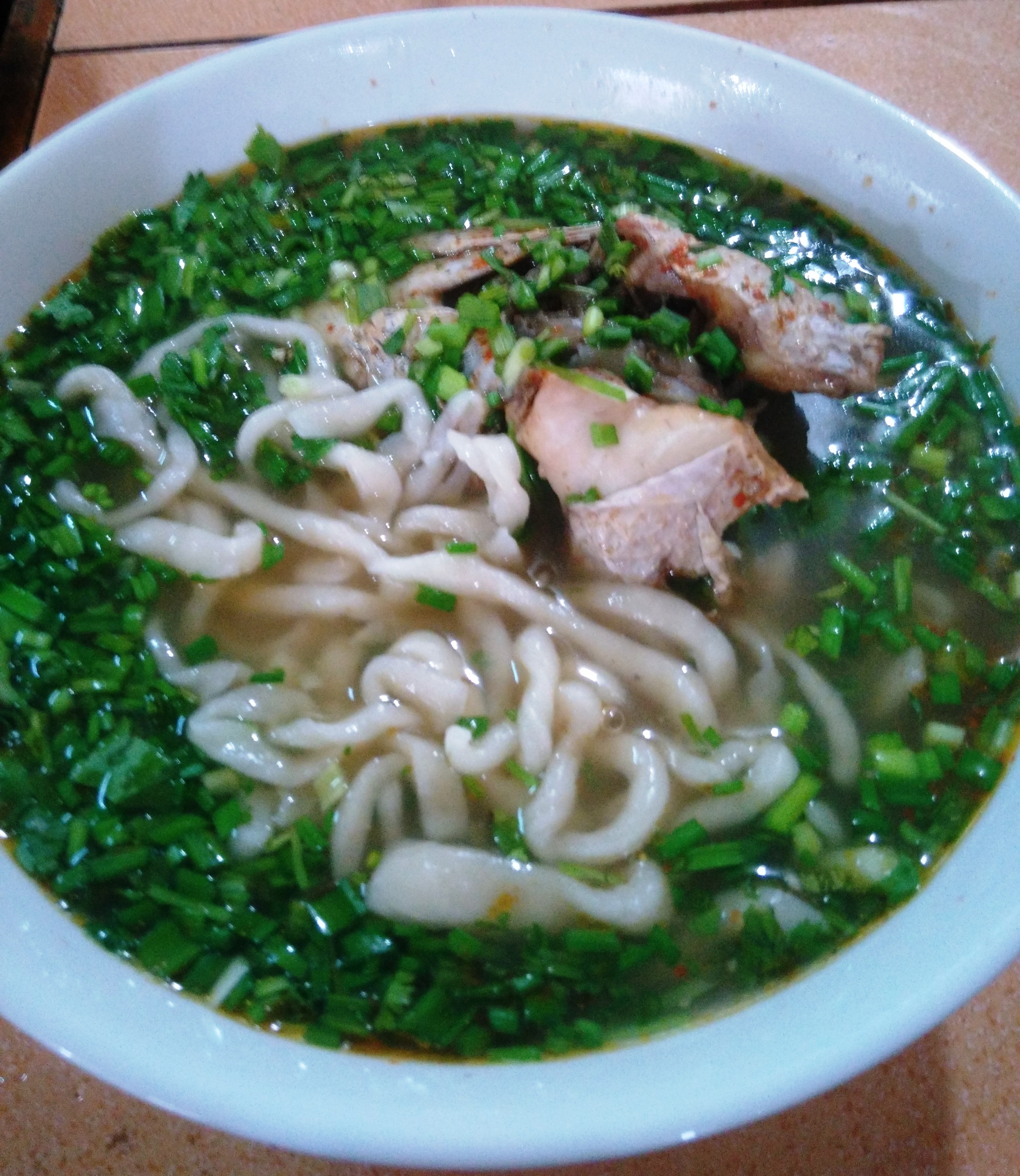
A bowl of bánh canh cá lóc (bánh canh with snakehead soup).

The Vietnamese word bánh refers to items such as noodles or cakes that are made from flour, and canh means "soup."

People in Tay Ninh have a unique way of eating Trang Bang rice noodle soup, dividing the serving into two bowls: one bowl containing the noodles and broth, and the other for the meat and vegetables, which are dipped separately, hence the name "two-bowl rice noodle soup." Trang Bang rice noodle soup is often served with sun-dried rice paper, another Tay Ninh specialty.

== See also ==
- Udon, Japanese noodles
- Cu mian, Chinese thick noodles
- Shahe fen
- Rice noodles
- Lai fun
