= Cambodian Chinese cuisine =

Chinese cuisine developed by Cambodian Chinese

Cambodian Chinese or Sino-Khmer cuisine is a food tradition developed by the Cambodian Chinese living in Cambodia that is distinct from both Khmer and Chinese cuisines. The foodways of the Chinese Cambodians have not only been influenced by the Khmer but also by the Vietnamese and Chinese Vietnamese foodways.

The Chinese began migrating to Khmer Empire in the 13th century, bringing their cuisine with them, from which the Khmer cuisine adopted noodles, soy sauce, different vegetables, stir-frying, steaming and the custom of eating soup for breakfast. Until the mid-20th century, the Chinese that mostly migrated to Cambodia were Teochews and to a lesser extent also Hainans, Hakkas, and Cantonese. Nowadays, the Teochew kway teow has become a popular dish in Cambodia, where it is eaten for breakfast, lunch and dinner or as a snack and often flavoured with lime, chili, fish sauce, and palm sugar. Other Cambodian Chinese dishes include lort cha, babor, bai cha, chai yor, num kroch, and num pao.

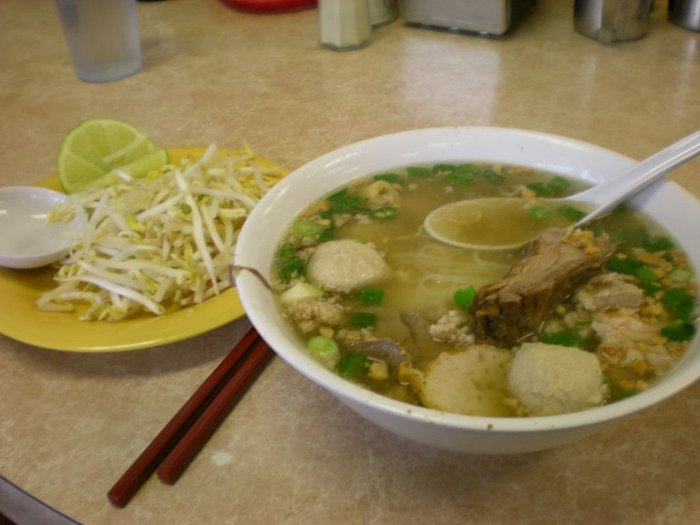
Phnom Penh-style kuyteav

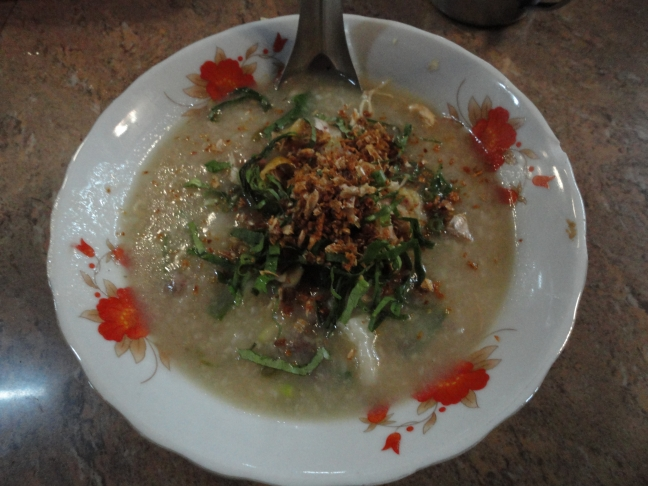
Babor

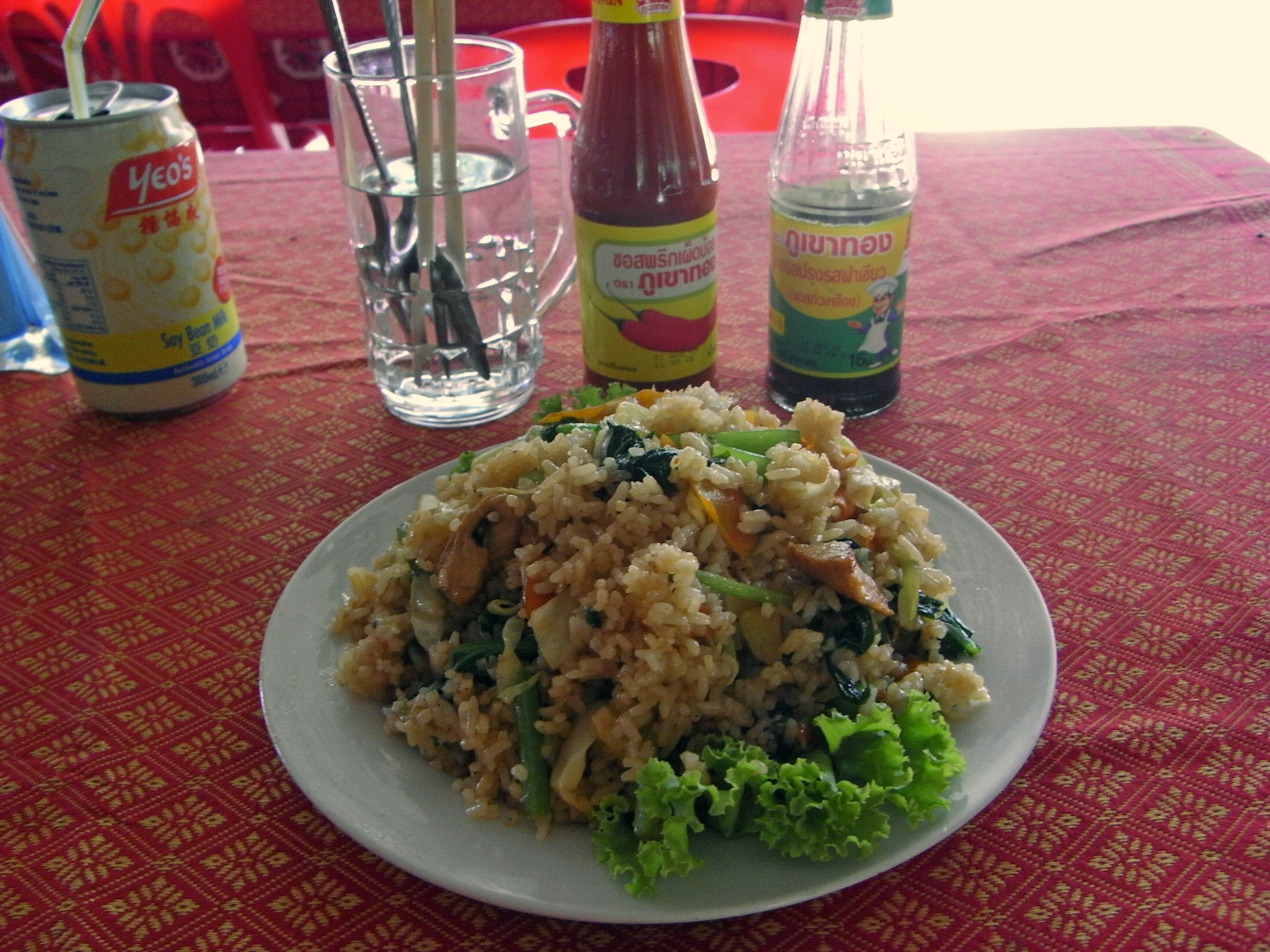
Bai cha

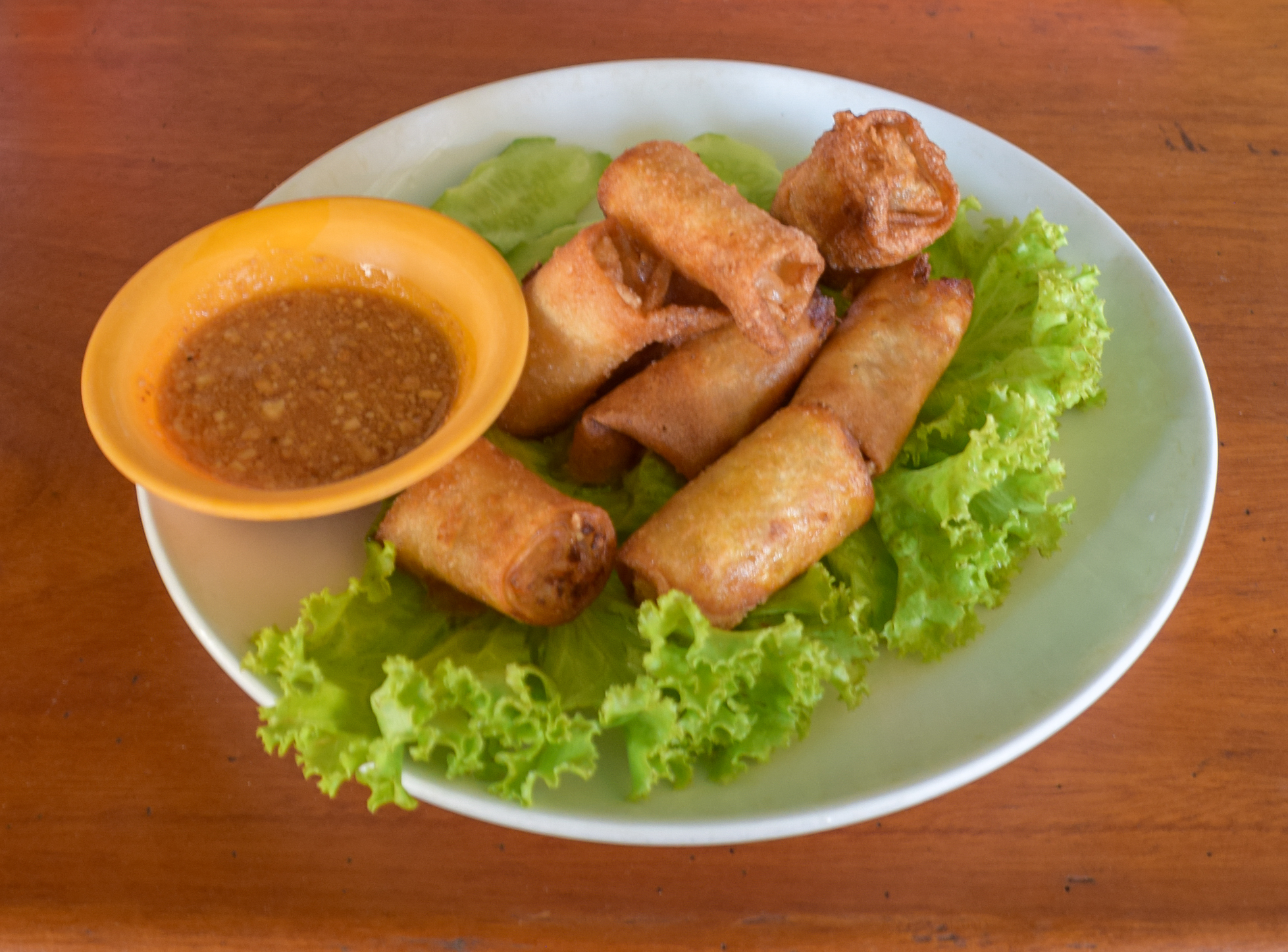
Chai yor

== Bibliography ==
- Chee-Beng Tan, ed. (2011). Chinese Food and Foodways in Southeast Asia and Beyond. NUS Press. ISBN 978-9-971-69548-4.
