= Lort cha =

Cambodian Chinese stir fry dish

- Alternative names: Lort char
- Type: Stir-fry
- Course: Main
- Place of origin: Cambodia
- Associated cuisine: Cambodian Chinese cuisine
- Serving temperature: Hot
- Main ingredients: Silver needle noodles, garlic, bean sprouts and scallions or chives, palm sugar, fish sauce, dark soy sauce and fried egg
- Food energy (per serving): 890 kcal (3,700 kJ)
Nutritional value
(per serving)
- Protein: 16 g
- Fat: 20 g
- Carbohydrate: 160 g

Lort cha (Khmer: លតឆា) is a Cambodian Chinese street food dish made by stir-frying silver needle noodles (លត, lort) with garlic, bean sprouts and scallions or chives, as well as Chinese greens or cabbage, beef, chicken or pork, in a mixture of palm sugar, fish sauce and dark soy sauce and served with a fried egg. In 2022, BBC named it as one of the 50 best street foods in Asia.

== Preparation ==
Finely chopped garlic is fried in a wok before adding noodles and the sauce-sugar mixture and stir-frying for a few minutes and then adding blanched bean sprouts and scallions or chives and stir-frying for a few more minutes and serving it with a fried egg on top and finely-sliced chillies, scallions or chives, blanched bean sprouts, and chili sauce, soy and fish sauce on the side.

The ingredients can also be partially stir-fried separately in three batches, starting with garlic, ginger and marinated pork followed by noodles and then by garlic shoots and gai lan before combing all the stir-fried ingredients and stir-frying them together for a few more minutes and serving with a fried egg on top and bean sprouts, lime halves, and chili oil on the side.
