= List of noodles =

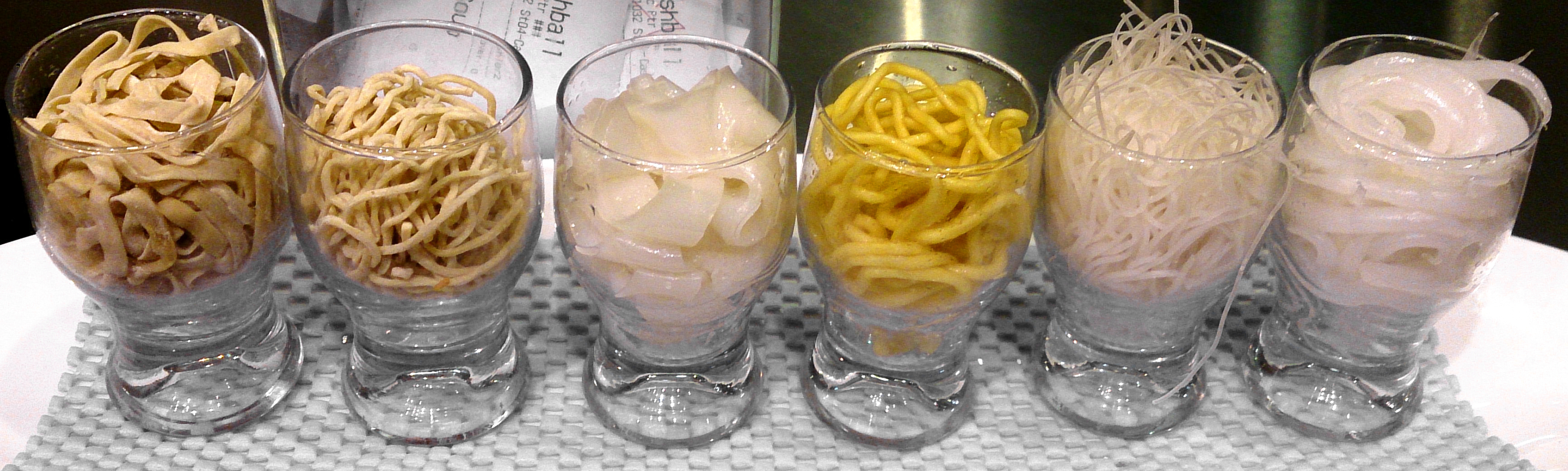
Various noodles commonly found in Southeast Asia

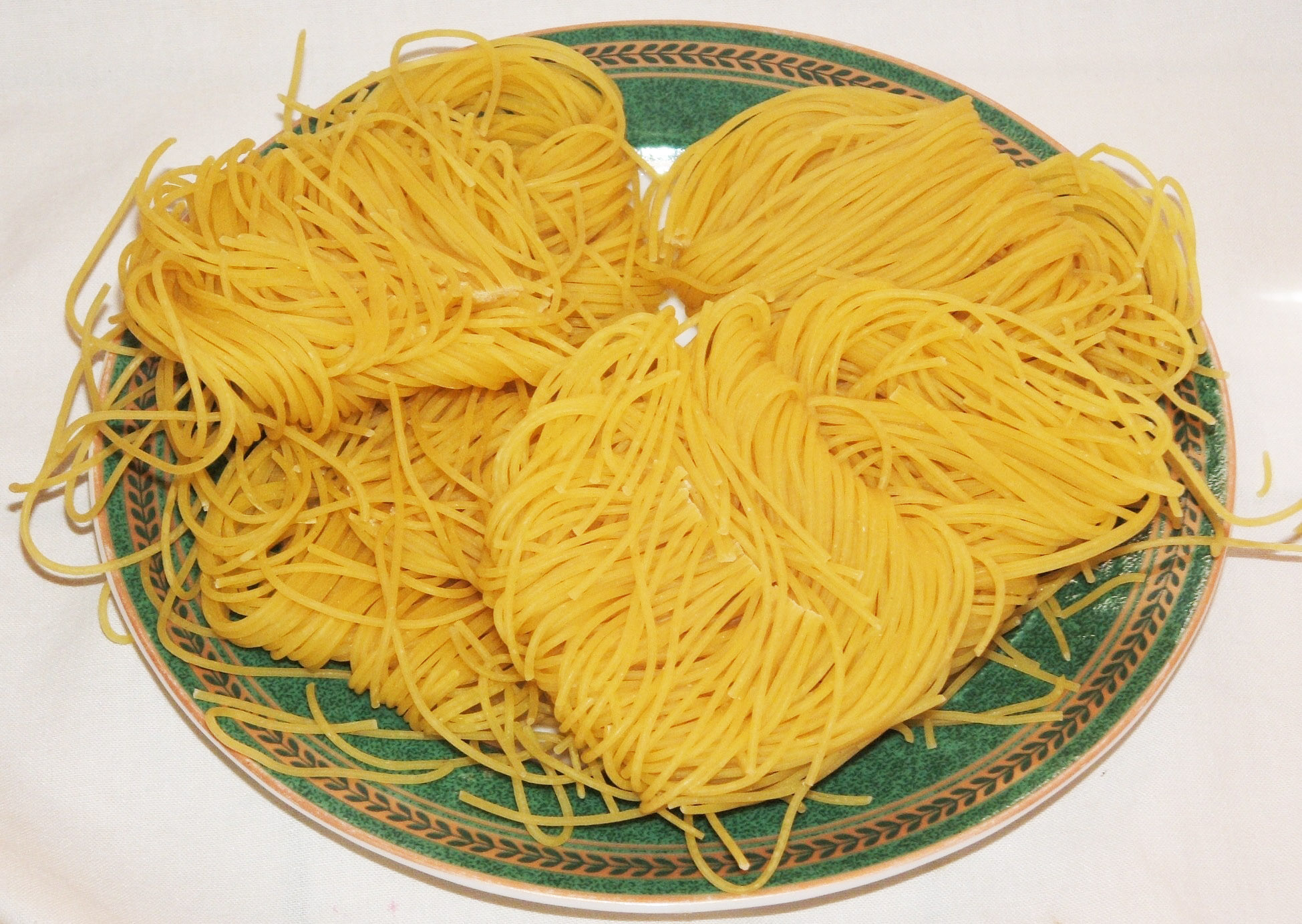
Vermicelli

This is a list of notable types of noodles. A separate list is available for noodle dishes. Noodles are a type of staple food made from some type of unleavened dough which is rolled flat and cut into long strips or strings. Noodles are usually cooked in boiling water, sometimes with cooking oil or salt added. They are often pan-fried or deep-fried. Noodles are often served with an accompanying sauce or in a soup. Noodles can be refrigerated for short-term storage, or dried and stored for future use.

== General ==
- Cup Noodles
- Fried noodles
- Frozen noodles
- Instant noodle
- Rice noodles
- Rice vermicelli

== Chinese noodles ==
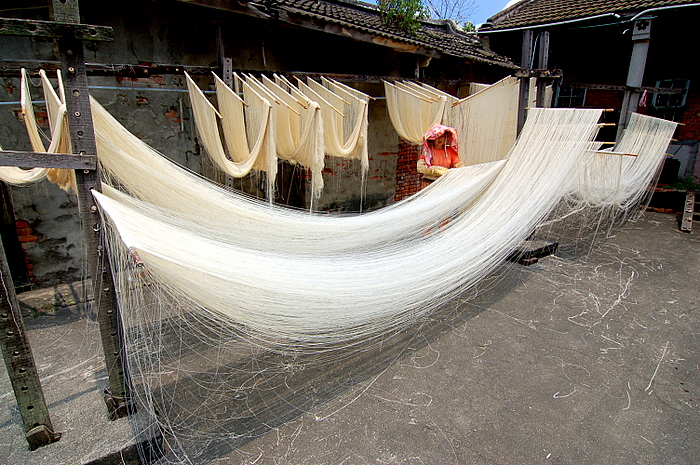
Misua noodle-making in Lukang, Taiwan

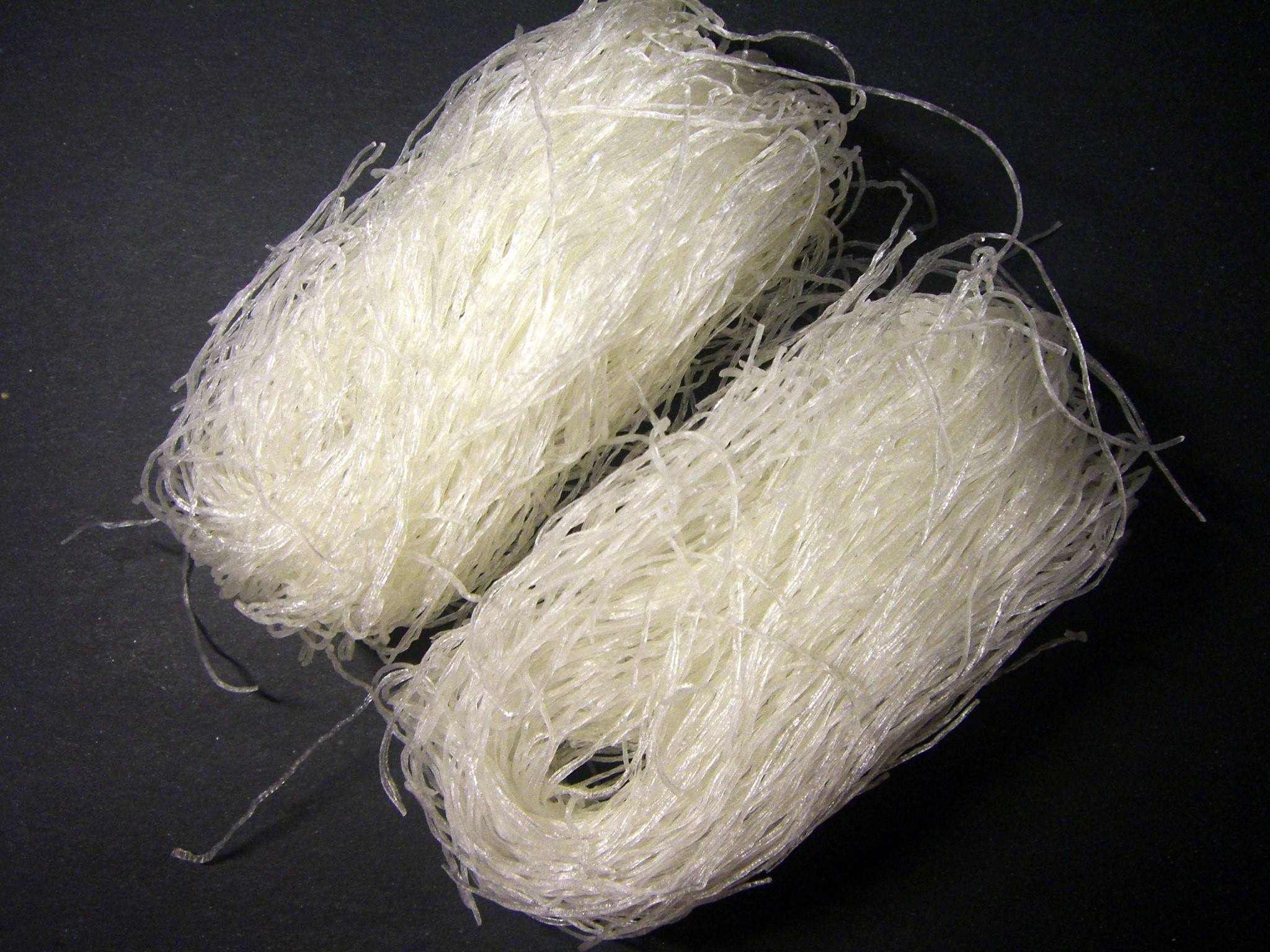
Cellophane noodles

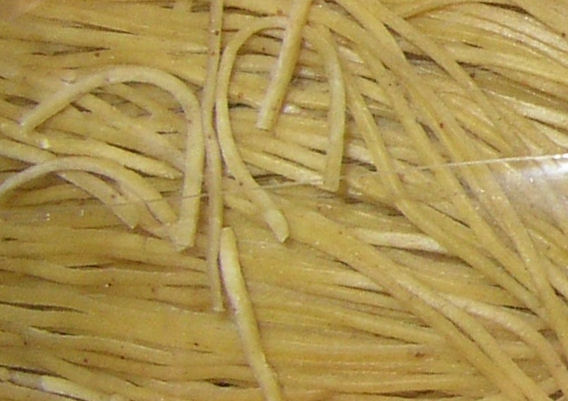
Shrimp roe noodles

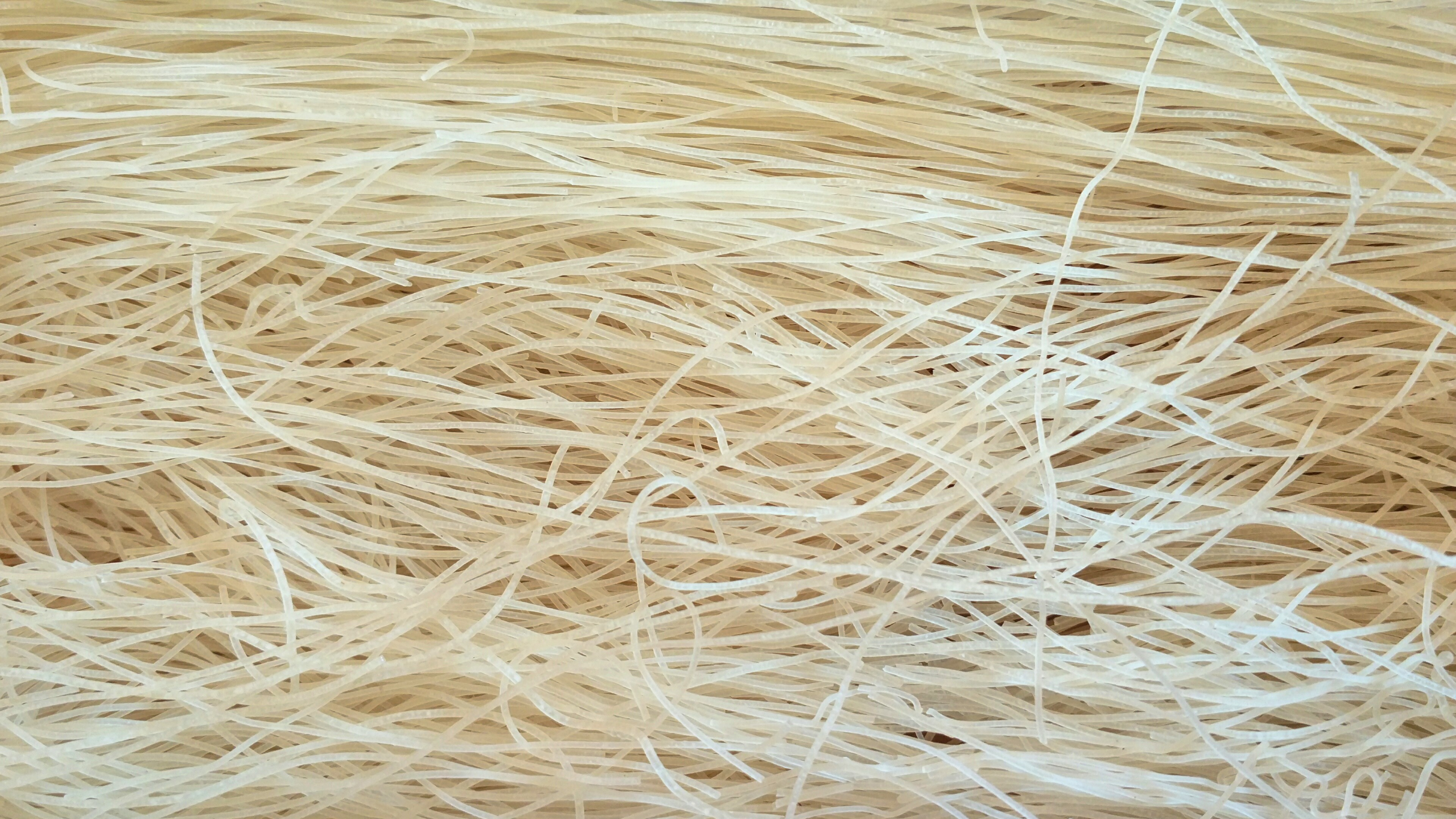
Rice vermicelli

There is a great variety of Chinese noodles, which vary according to their region of production, ingredients, shape or width, and manner of preparation. They are an important part of most regional cuisines within China, as well as in Taiwan, Singapore, and other Southeast Asian nations with sizable overseas Chinese populations.

- Biangbiang noodles
- Cellophane noodles
- Chinkiang pot cover noodles
- Cumian
- Daoxiao noodles
- Dragon beard noodles
- Hot dry noodles
- Jook-sing noodles
- Kaomianjin
- Lai fun
- Lamian
- Liangpi
- Migan
- Misua
- Mixian
- Mung bean sheets
- Oil noodles
- Paomo
- Rice vermicelli
- Saang mein
- Shahe fen
- Shrimp roe noodles
- Silver needle noodles
- Yi mein
- Youmian

=== Hong Kong ===
- Gong Zai Mian

== Filipino ==
- Canton – egg noodles, usually round
- Bihon – rice noodles
- Lomi – thick egg noodles
- Miki – soft yellow egg noodles, usually flat
- Misua – wheat vermicelli
- Palabok – yellow cornstarch noodles
- Sotanghon – glass noodles

== Indian ==
- Idiyappam
- Sevai

== Indonesian ==
- Bakmi
- Bihun – made from rice flour
- Cirambay – made of tapioca
- Kwetiau
- Mie jagung – made from corn starch.
- Mie sagu – made from sago starch.
- Mie singkong/mocaf – made from cassava starch.
- Soun – made from tapioca, ganyong starch, or aren starch. Blue soun also popular with food coloring process.

== Japanese ==
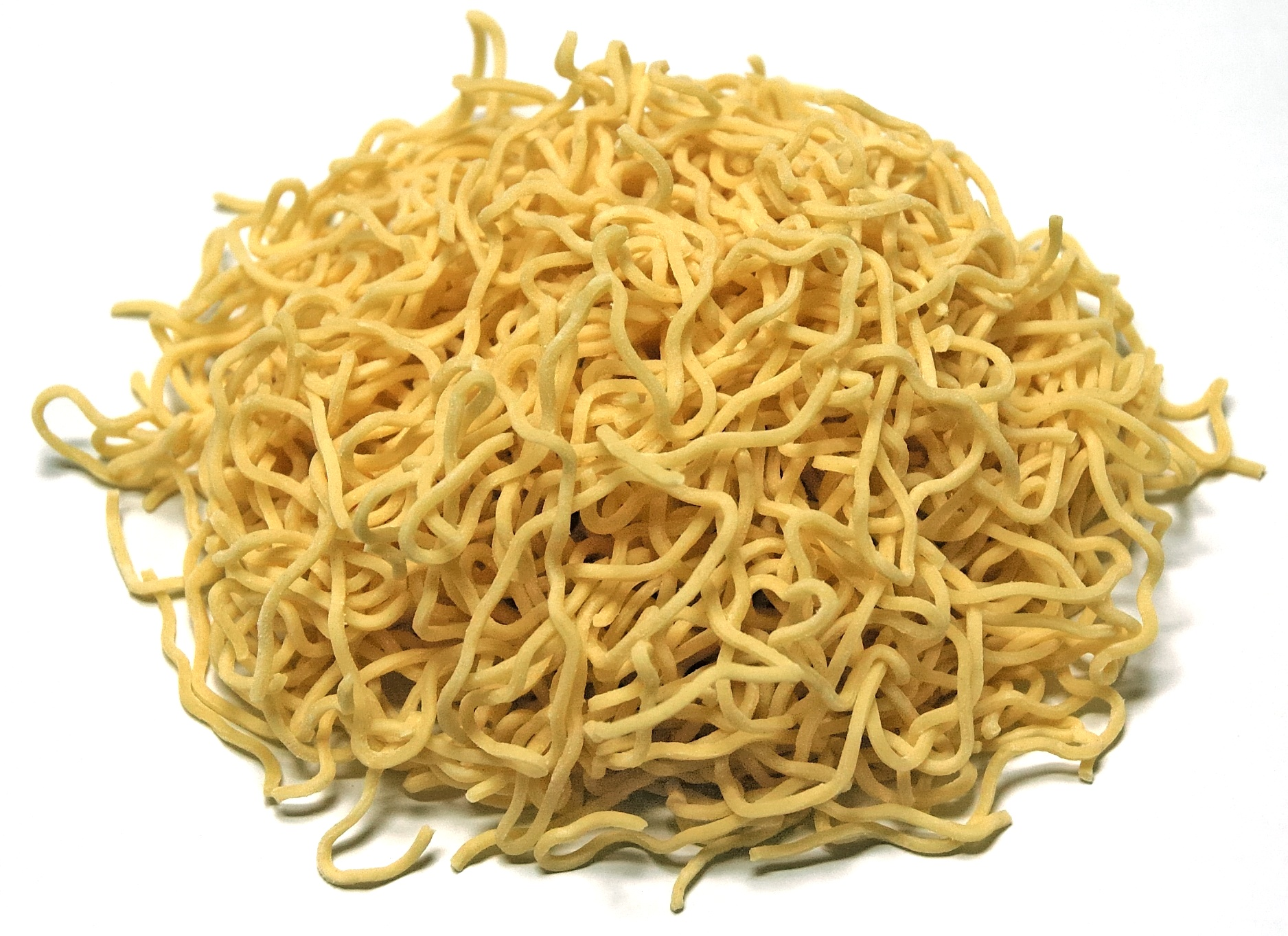
Fresh ramen

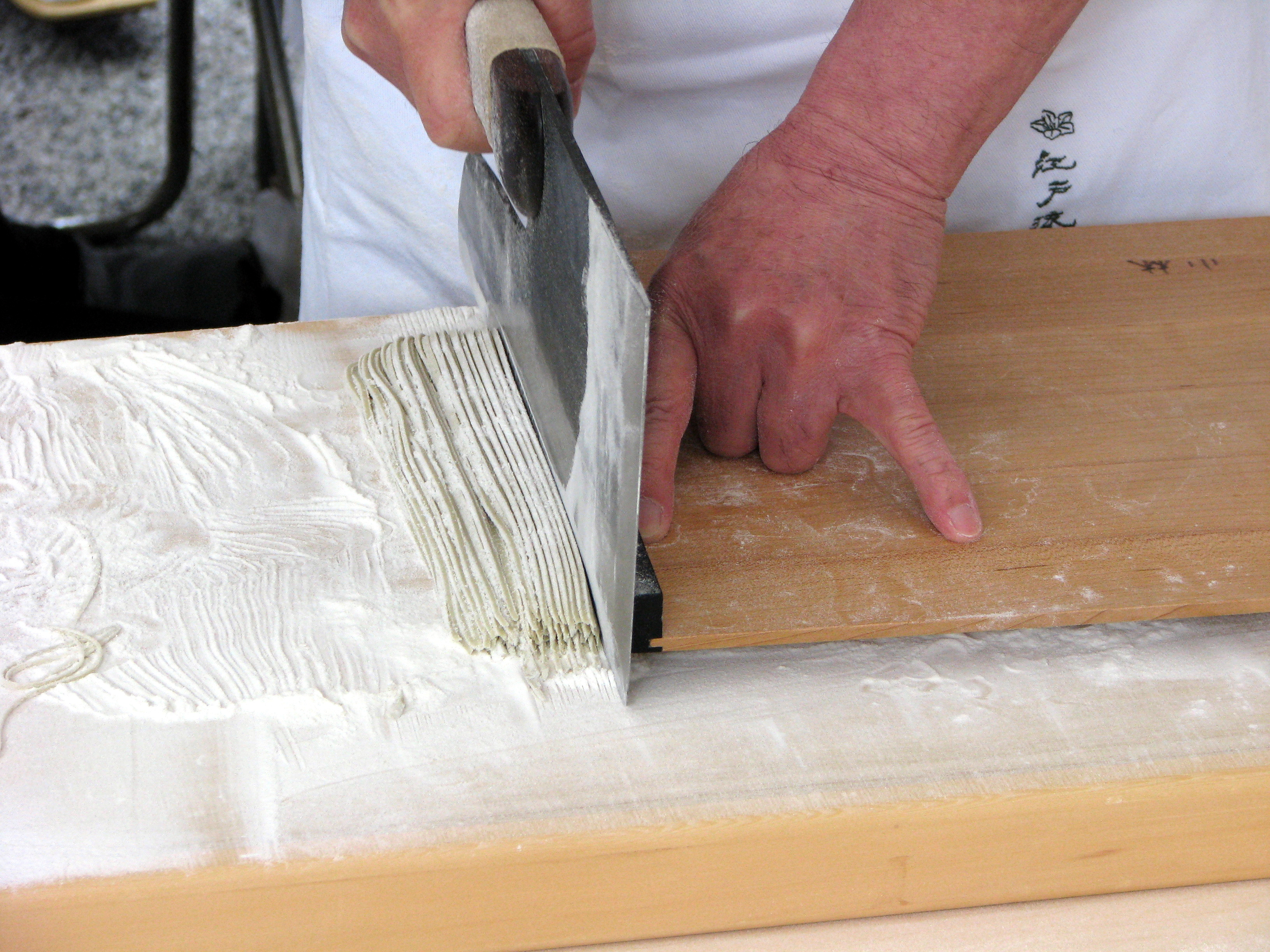
Slicing soba noodles as part of its preparation

Japanese noodles are a staple part of Japanese cuisine. They are often served chilled with dipping sauces, or in soups or hot dishes.

- Harusame
- Hiyamugi
- Ramen
- Shirataki
- Soba
- Sōmen
- Tokoroten
- Udon

== Korean ==
Korean noodles are noodles or noodle dishes in Korean cuisine, and are collectively referred to as guksu in native Korean or myeon (cf. mien) in Sino-Korean vocabulary.

- Cellophane noodles
- Cheonsachae
- Dotori guksu
- Garak guksu
- Jjolmyeon
- Kalguksu

== Malaysian ==
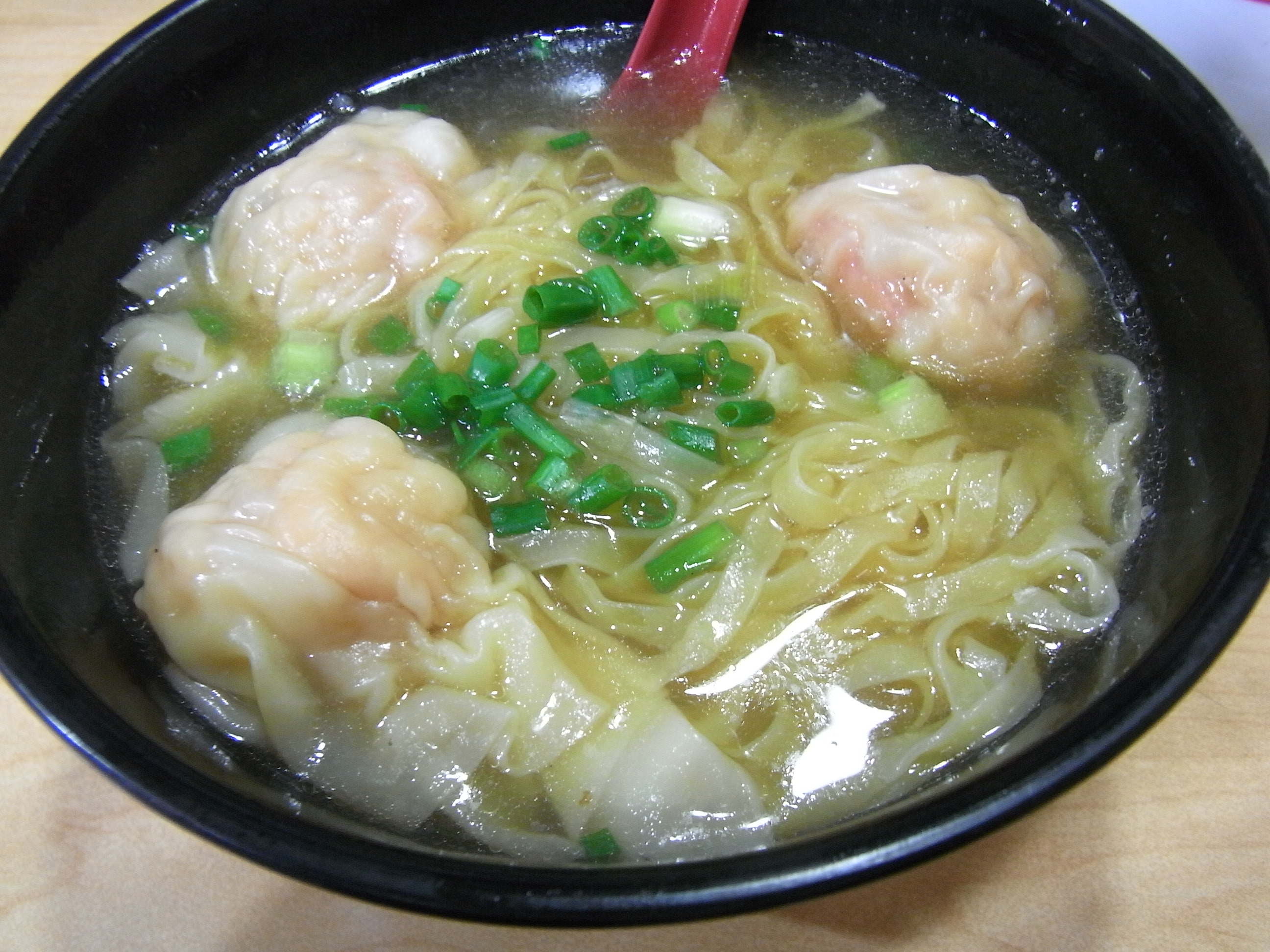
Wonton noodles

- Char kway teow
- Kolo mee
- Mee bandung Muar
- Mee goreng
- Mee kari
- Mee Rebus
- Pan mee

== Thai ==
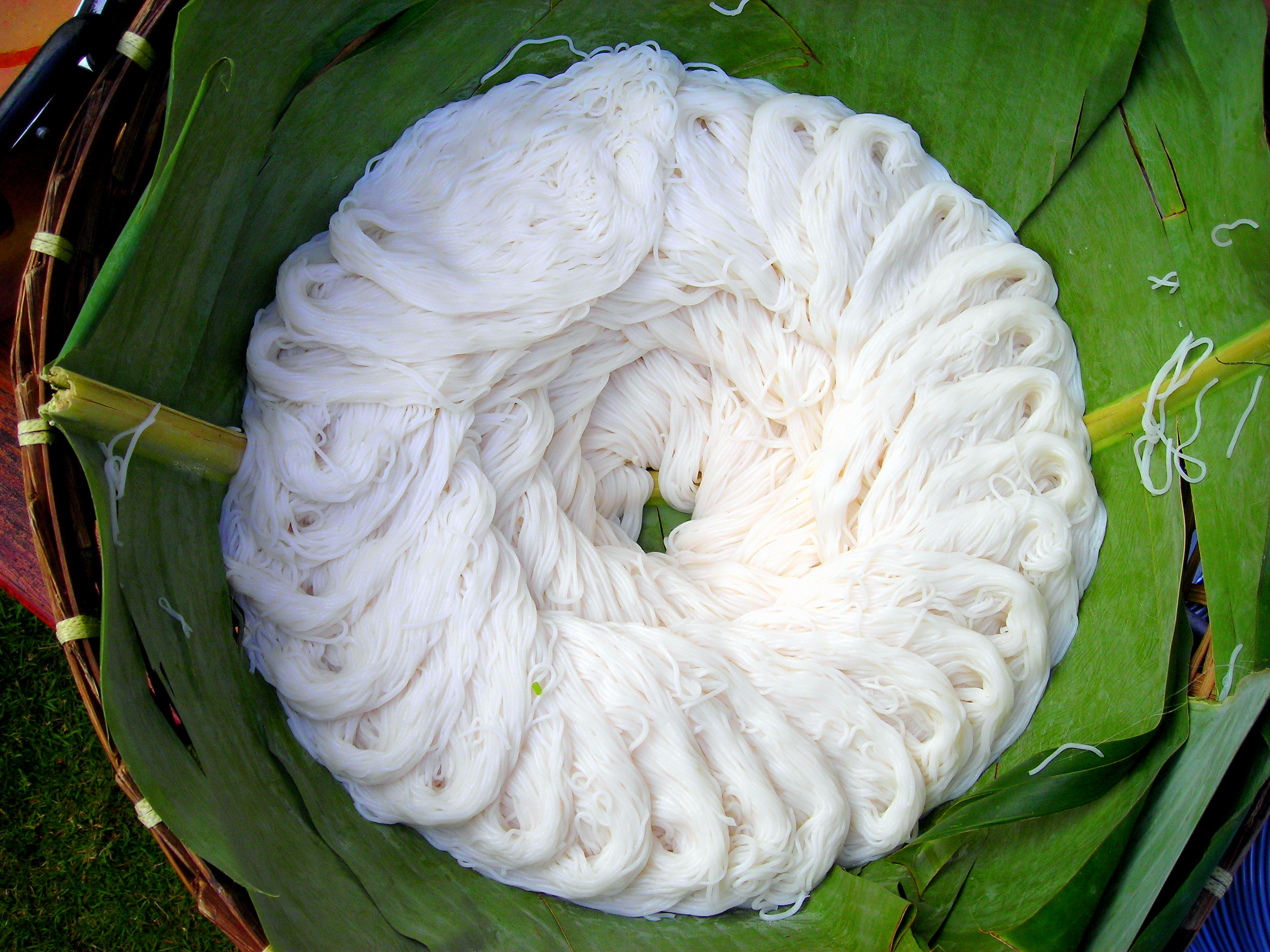
Thai rice noodles

- Khanom chin
- Rice noodles

== Vietnamese ==
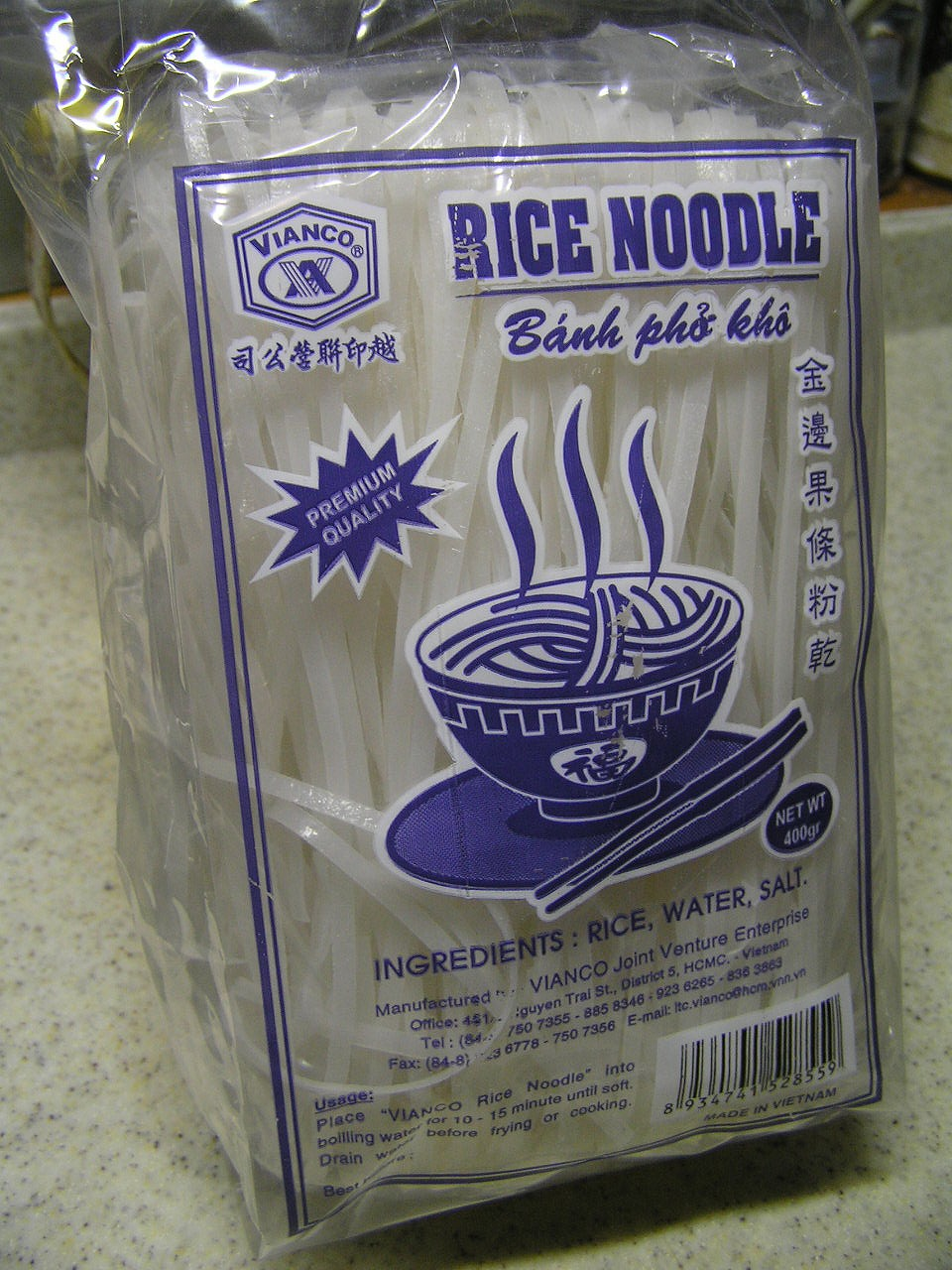
Dried banh pho

== Other Asian noodles ==
- Kesme

== Other European noodles ==
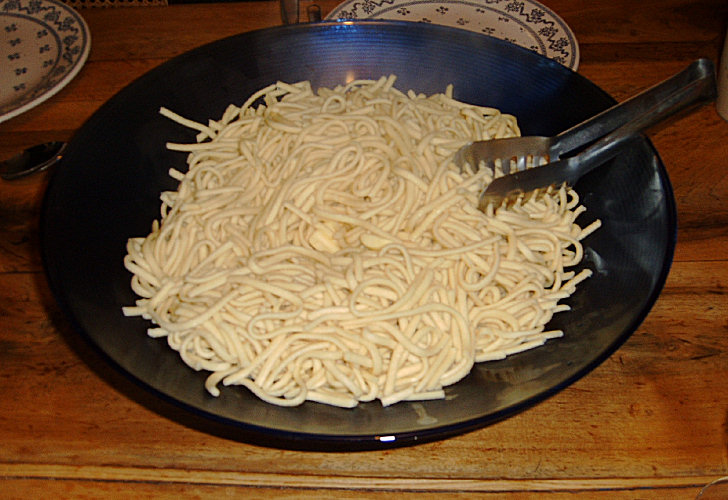
Commercial thin spätzle

- Mohnnudel
- Schupfnudel

== See also ==
- List of noodle dishes
- List of noodle restaurants
- List of instant noodle brands
- List of pasta
