= Anjeunbaengi wheat =

South Korean wheat variety

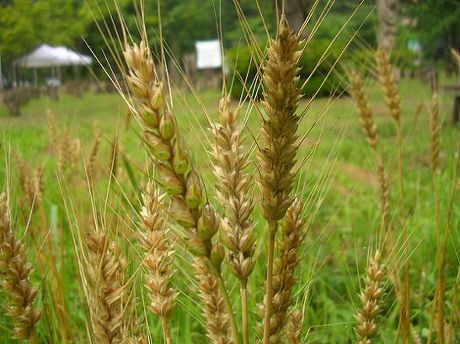
- Origin: Southern Korea

Korean name
- Hangul: 앉은뱅이밀
- RR: anjeunbaengimil
- MR: anjŭnbaengimil

Anjeunbaengi wheat (Korean: 앉은뱅이밀), also known as Jinju native wheat, is a variety of wheat originating in southern South Korea. The wheat has been noted for its durability and relatively quick growing time.

== Cultivation ==
Anjeunbaengi wheat is primarily grown in the southern provinces of South Korea, where the warmer climate can better stimulate plant growth than in the north. The stalk of the wheat is short, being only between 50–80 cm tall. The next years wheat crop is sown in late October and early November. In the next summer, the wheat can be double cropped with rice. Harvesting of the wheat commences in June.

The wheat crop suffered when in 1984 the South Korean government ceased subsidizing wheat. This cessation resulted in Anjeunbaengi wheat becoming increasingly uncommon.

== Description ==
The berry of the wheat is small, red, and has been described as having a sweet taste and a pleasant aroma. The wheat is low in gluten, and is commonly used in Korean wheat noodles and dumplings.
