= Kaomianjin =

Grilled gluten noodle dish

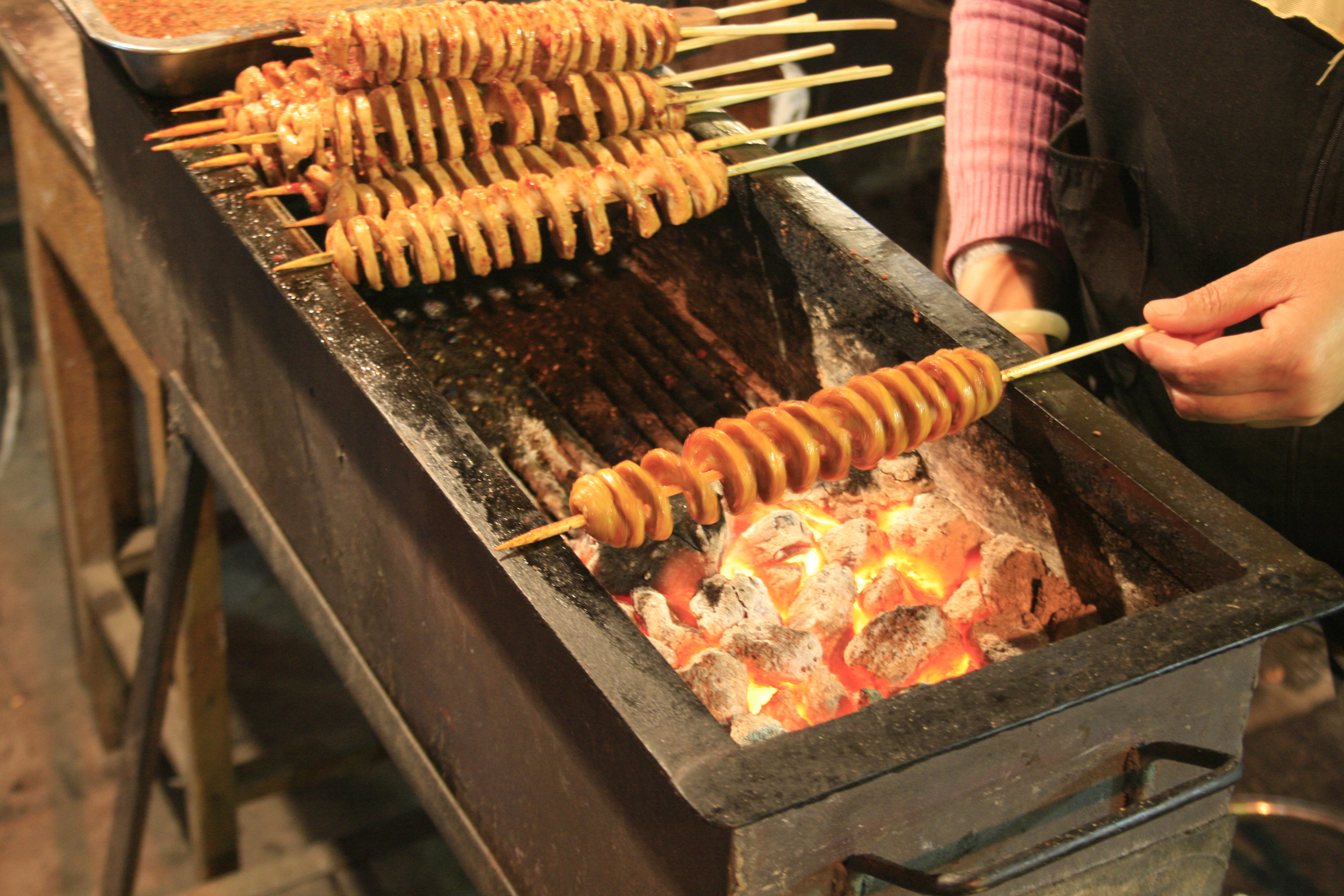
- Kaomianjin on a barbecue stall in China
- Type: Chinese noodles
- Place of origin: China
- Main ingredients: seitan

Kaomianjin
- Traditional Chinese: 烤麵筋
- Simplified Chinese: 烤面筋
Transcriptions
Standard Mandarin
- Hanyu Pinyin: kǎomiànjīn

Kaomianjin or roast gluten (simplified Chinese: 烤面筋; traditional Chinese: 烤麵筋) is a type of grilled noodle commonly served in Xi'an, China. Gluten dough, or seitan is shaped into spirals and baked over a barbecue before being sprinkled with spices.
