= Chinese noodles =

Noodles in Chinese cuisine

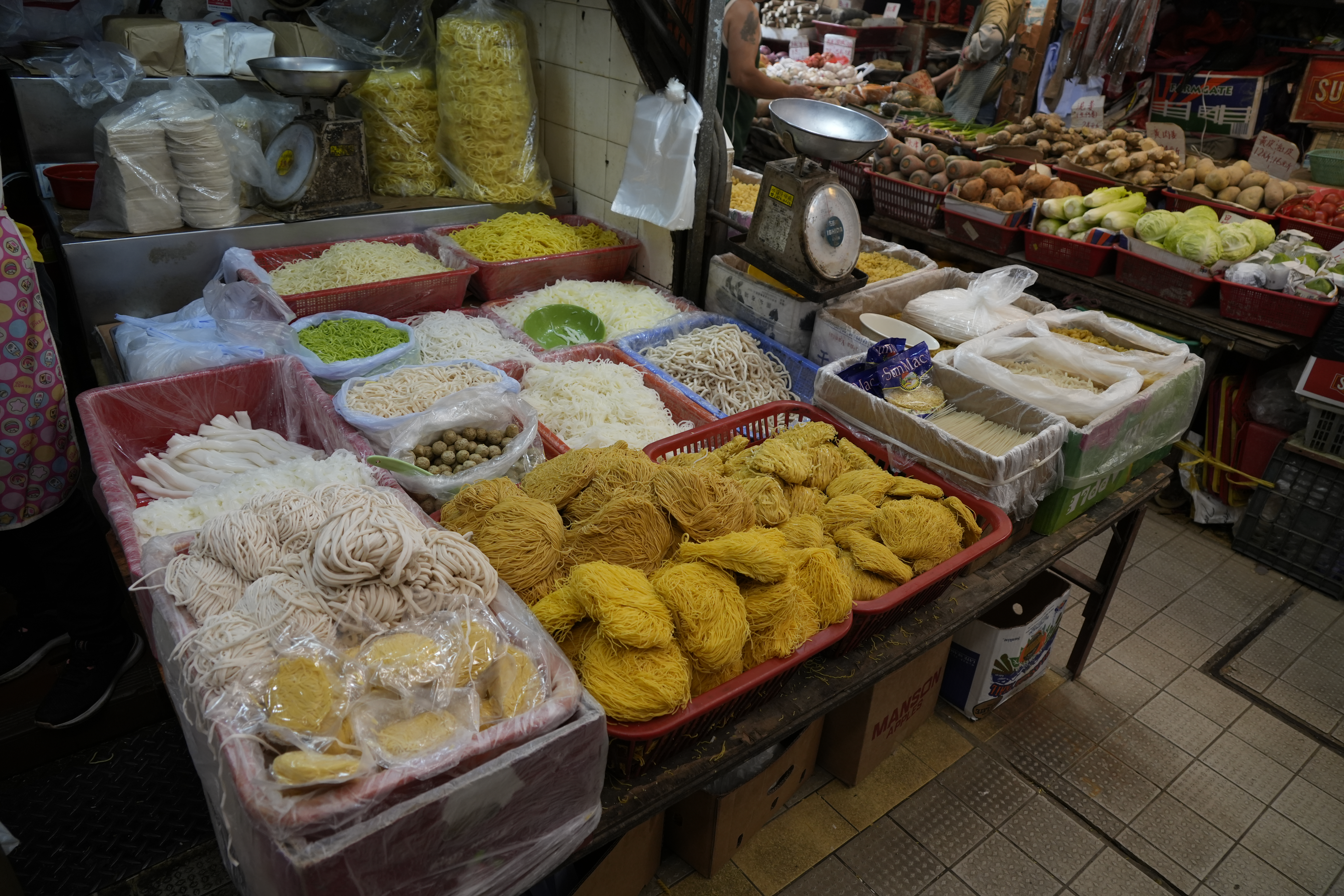
- Chinese noodles at a noodle shop in Tuen Mun, Hong Kong
- Type: Noodles
- Place of origin: China

Chinese noodles vary widely according to the region of production, ingredients, shape or width, and manner of preparation. Noodles were invented in China, and are an essential ingredient and staple in Chinese cuisine. They are an important part of most regional cuisines within China, and other countries with sizable overseas Chinese populations.

Chinese noodles can be made of wheat, buckwheat, rice, millet, maize, oats, acorns, kudzu, Siberian elm, soybeans, mung beans, seaweed, yams, cassava, potatoes, sweet potatoes, and meats such as fish and shrimp. There are over 1,200 types of noodles commonly consumed across China today, more than 2,000 different cooking methods for Chinese noodles, and tens of thousands of dish varieties prepared using these types of noodles in China.

Chinese noodles have entered the cuisines of neighboring East Asian countries such as Korea, Japan, and Mongolia, as well as Southeast Asian countries such as Malaysia, Singapore, Indonesia, Vietnam, Cambodia, Myanmar, Laos, the Philippines and Thailand.

== Nomenclature ==
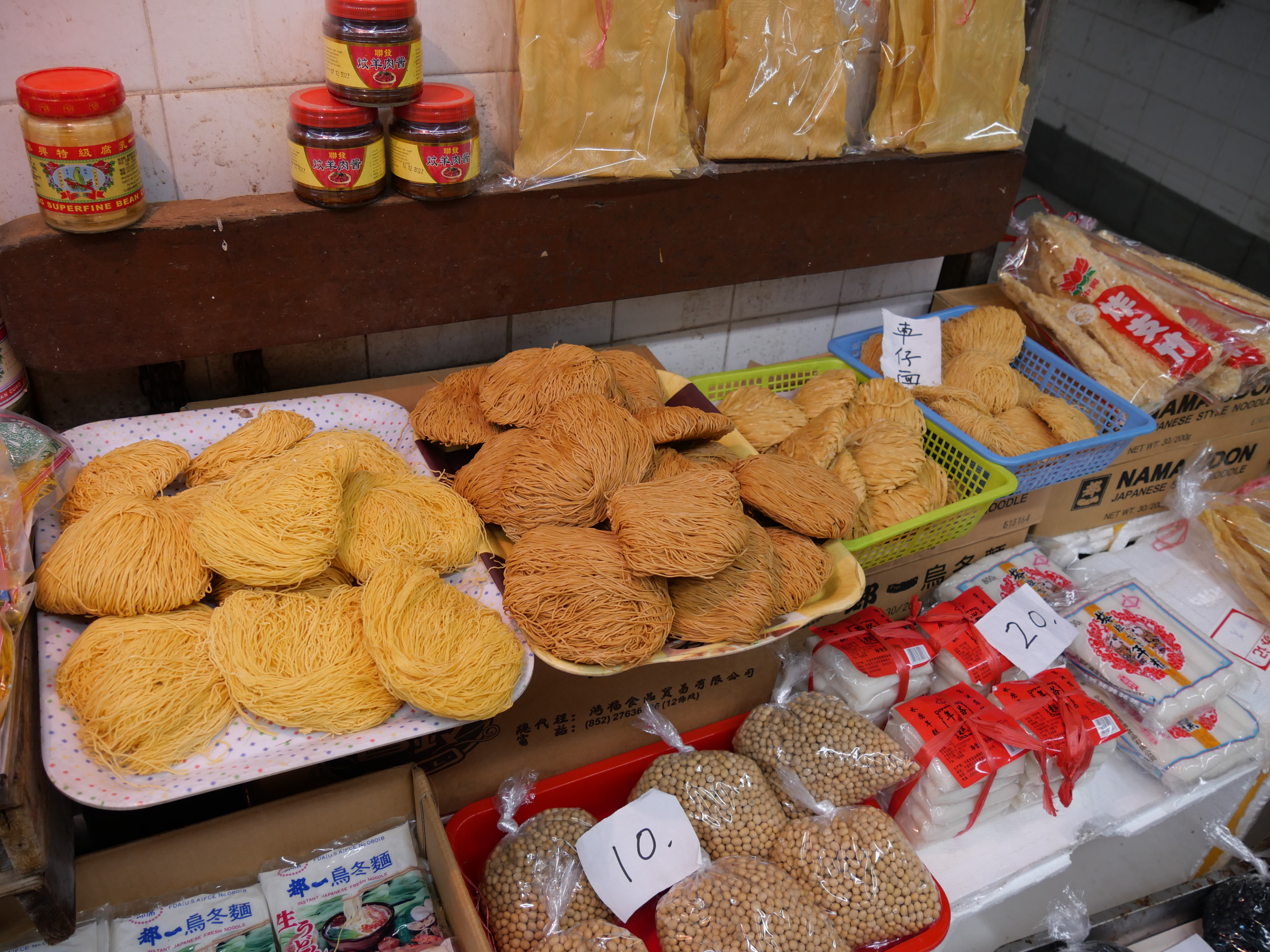
Noodles at a store in Yuen Long

Nomenclature for Chinese noodles can be difficult due to the vast number of noodle types available in China and the many dialects and languages used to name them. There is no single Chinese word equivalent to the Western concept of "noodles," nor is the notion of "noodles" as a unified food category recognized within Chinese cuisine.

In Mandarin, miàn (simplified Chinese: 面; traditional Chinese: 麵; often transliterated as "mien" or "mein" ) refers to noodles made from wheat flour, while fěn (粉) or "fun" refers to noodles made from other starches, particularly rice flour and mung bean starch. Each noodle type can be rendered in pinyin for Mandarin, but in Hong Kong and neighboring Guangdong it will be known by its Cantonese pronunciation ("meen" or "mien" for wheat noodles, "fun" for non-wheat). Taiwan, Malaysia, Singapore and many overseas Chinese communities in Southeast Asia use Hokkien (Min Nan) (e.g. "mee" for wheat noodles, "hoon" or "hun" for non-wheat). Wheat noodles, for example, are called "mian" in Mandarin, "mein" in Cantonese, "men" in Japanese, "mee" in Thai, and "myeon" in Korean.

The names of some types of noodles are based on the name of their principal ingredient (such as wheat, buckwheat, rice, potato, corn flour, bean or soybean flour, yam flour, mung-bean starch, sweet potato, or cassava).

== History ==
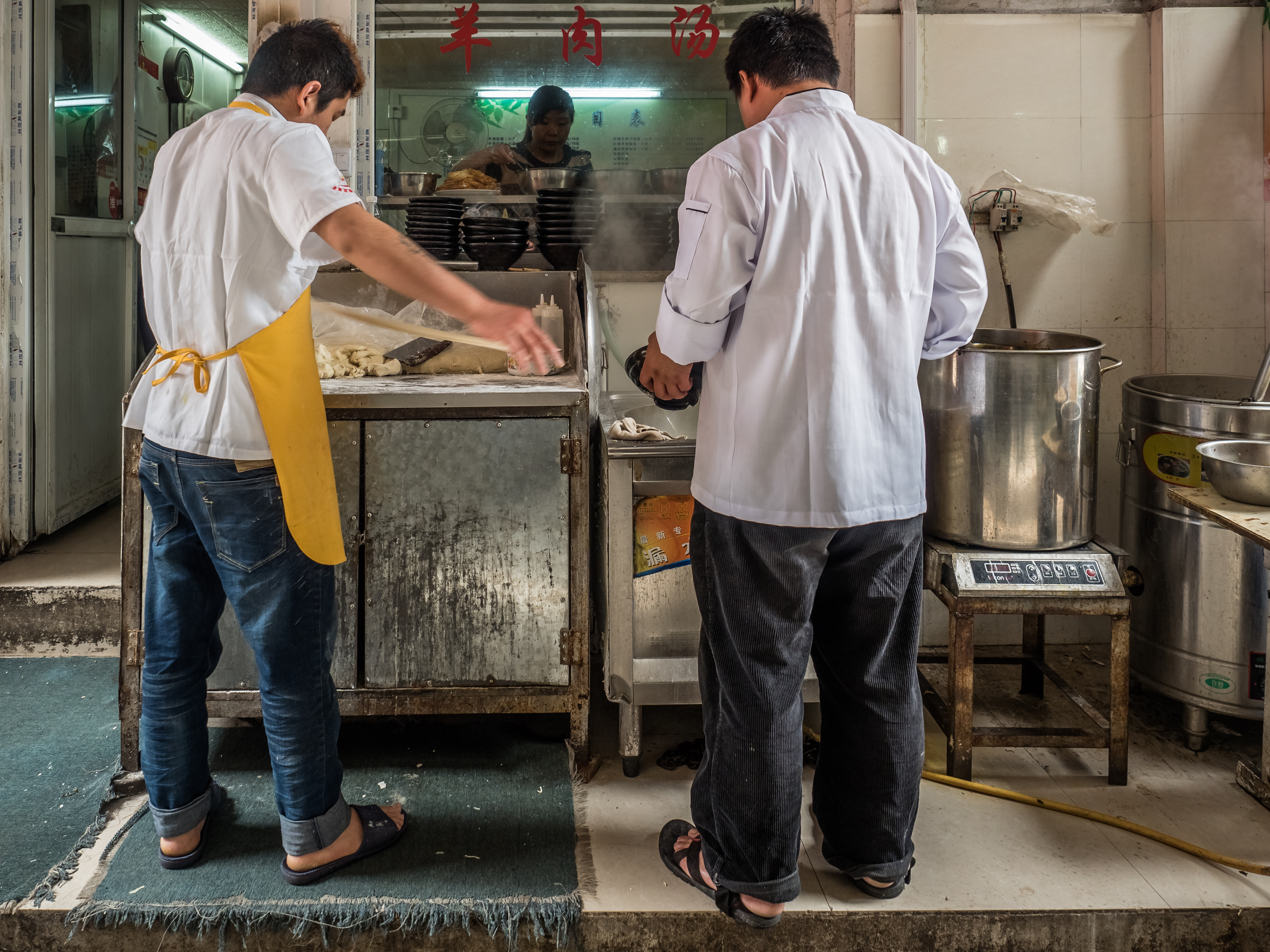
Two men making noodles in Shanghai

The earliest written record of noodles is from a book dated to the Eastern Han period (25–220 AD). Noodles, often made from wheat dough, became a prominent staple of food during the Han dynasty. In the Western Han dynasty, due to demand by the military, it was necessary for the government to implement food processing technologies that would make the food storage easier and more affordable. During this time, "Laomian" emerged, it was made with starch-rich buckwheat, millet and pea flours with lower water content, making it easier to store and transport.

Chinese noodles have had far reaching influences beyond China's borders. Food historian Gil Marks documented Chinese noodle-making traditions spread along the Silk Road to Central Asia and had reached Persia by the fourth or fifth century. In Persia, they were known as laksha which is the Farsi word for "slippery". The food was later spread westwards to Sicily and Spain through Arab influence, where noodles were known as itriya. From Sicily, it subsequently spread to mainland Italy sometime after the tenth century.

During the Song dynasty (960–1279) noodle shops were very popular in the cities, and remained open all night. During the earlier dynastic periods Chinese wheat noodles were known as "soup cake" (Chinese: 湯餅; pinyin: tāng bǐng), as explained by the Song dynasty scholar Huáng Cháo Yīng (黃朝英) mentions in his work "A delightful mixed discussion on various scholarly topics" (Chinese: 靖康緗素雜記; pinyin: jìngkāngxiāngsùzájì, Scroll 2) that in ancient times bready foods like pasta are referred collectively as "bing" and differentiated through their cooking methods.·

Up until 1992, most dried Chinese noodles in the United States could not be sold labelled as "noodles". This is due to fact that many Chinese noodles are made without eggs and do not always use wheat as starch, thus resulting in the United States Department of Agriculture obliging manufacturers to label them as "imitation noodles" or "alimentary paste".

== Production ==
Chinese noodles are generally made from either wheat flour, rice flour, or mung bean starch, with wheat noodles being more commonly produced and consumed with the ancient wooden noodles mold technology in northern China and rice noodles being more typical of southern China. Egg, lye, and cereal may also be added to noodles made from wheat flour in order to give the noodles a different color or flavor. Egg whites, arrowroot or tapioca starch are sometimes added to the flour mixture in low quantities to change the texture and tenderness of the noodles' strands. Although illegal, the practice of adding the chemical cross-linker borax to whiten noodles and improve their texture is also quite common in East Asia. In general, the Chinese noodles cooking method involves making a dough with flour, salt, and water; mixing the dough by hand to form bar shapes; bending the bars for proofing; pulling the bars into strips; dropping the strips into a pot with boiling water; and removing the noodles when finished cooking. Chinese type noodles are generally made from hard wheat flours, characterized by bright creamy white or bright yellow color and firm texture.

Before the automatic noodle machine was invented in 1950s, the processing of Chinese noodles were made with four steps, including:

- Fresh – The noodles are often consumed within 24 hours of manufacture due to quick discoloration. Their shelf life can be extended to 3–5 days if stored under refrigeration;
- Dried – Fresh noodle strands are dried by sunlight or in a controlled chamber;
- Boiled – Fresh noodle strands are either parboiled or fully cooked. After parboiling, Chinese noodles are rinsed in cold water, drained and covered with 1–2% vegetable oil to prevent sticking;
- Steamed – Fresh alkaline noodle strands are steamed in a steamer and softened with water through rinsing.

The dough for noodles made from wheat flour is typically made from wheat flour, salt, and water, with the addition of eggs or lye depending on the desired texture and taste of the noodles. Rice or other starch-based noodles are typically made with only the starch or rice flour and water. After the formation of a pliable dough mass, one of the six below types of mechanical processing may be applied to produce the noodles:

English	Chinese	Pinyin	Process
Cut	切	qiē	The dough is rolled out into a flat sheet, folded, and then cut into noodles of a desired width
Extruded	挤压	jǐ yā	The dough is placed into a mechanical press with holes through which the dough is forced to form strands of noodles
Peeled	削	xiāo	A firm dough is mixed and formed into a long loaf. Strips of dough are then quickly sliced or peeled off the loaf directly into boiling water
Pulled	拉	lā	The dough is rolled into a long cylinder, which is then repeatedly stretched and folded to produce a single thin strand
Kneaded	揉	róu	A ball of dough is lightly rolled on a flat surface or kneaded with one's hands until it is formed into the desired shape
Flicked	柭	bó	A soft dough is prepared, placed in a bowl, strips of dough are pulled and flicked directly into boiling water using a flexible bamboo stick or chopstick

While cut and extruded noodles can be dried to create a shelf-stable product to be eaten months after production, most peeled, pulled and kneaded noodles are consumed shortly after they are produced.

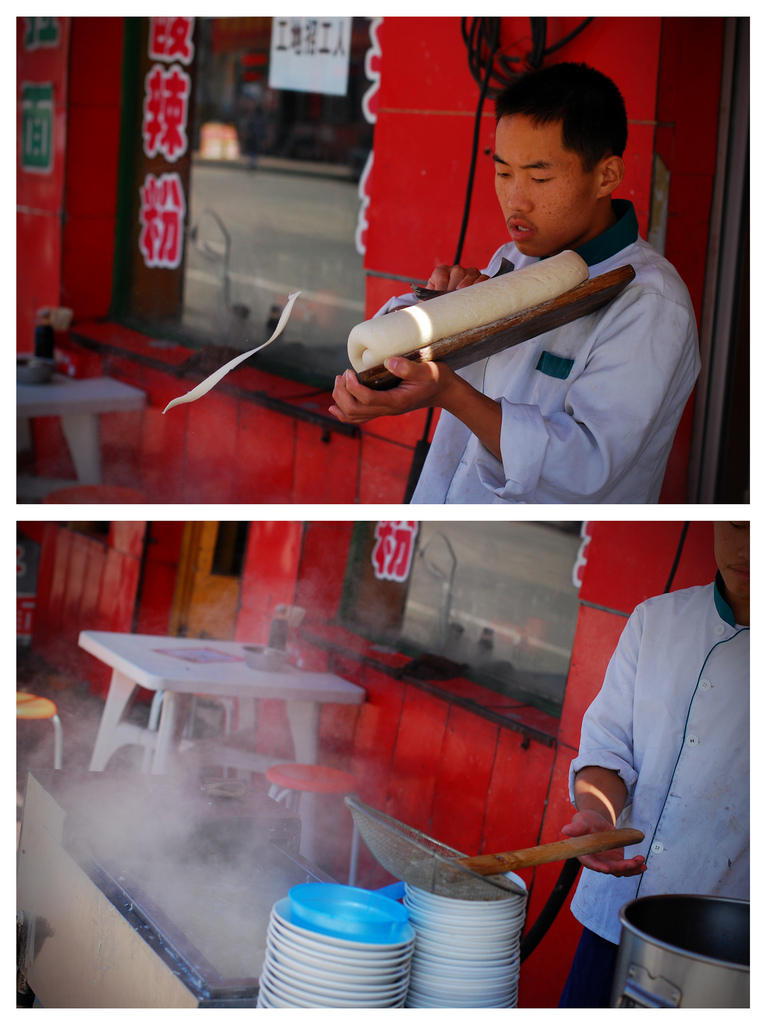
Cutting thin strips of dough from a loaf directly into a container of boiling water to make knife-cut noodles in Datong, Shanxi (first frame shows one noodle in midair)

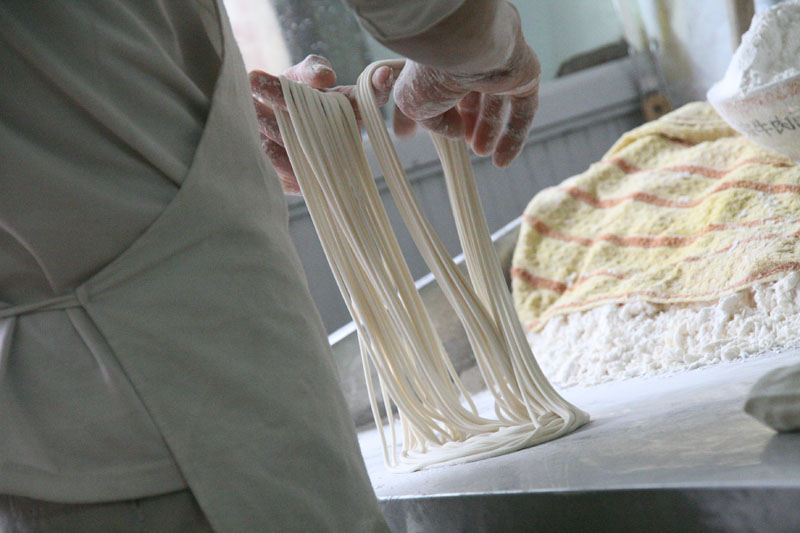
Pulling wheat dough into one thin strand to form lamian

Noodle maker in Pengzhou, Sichuan, extruding noodles directly into a pot of boiling water

== Cooking ==
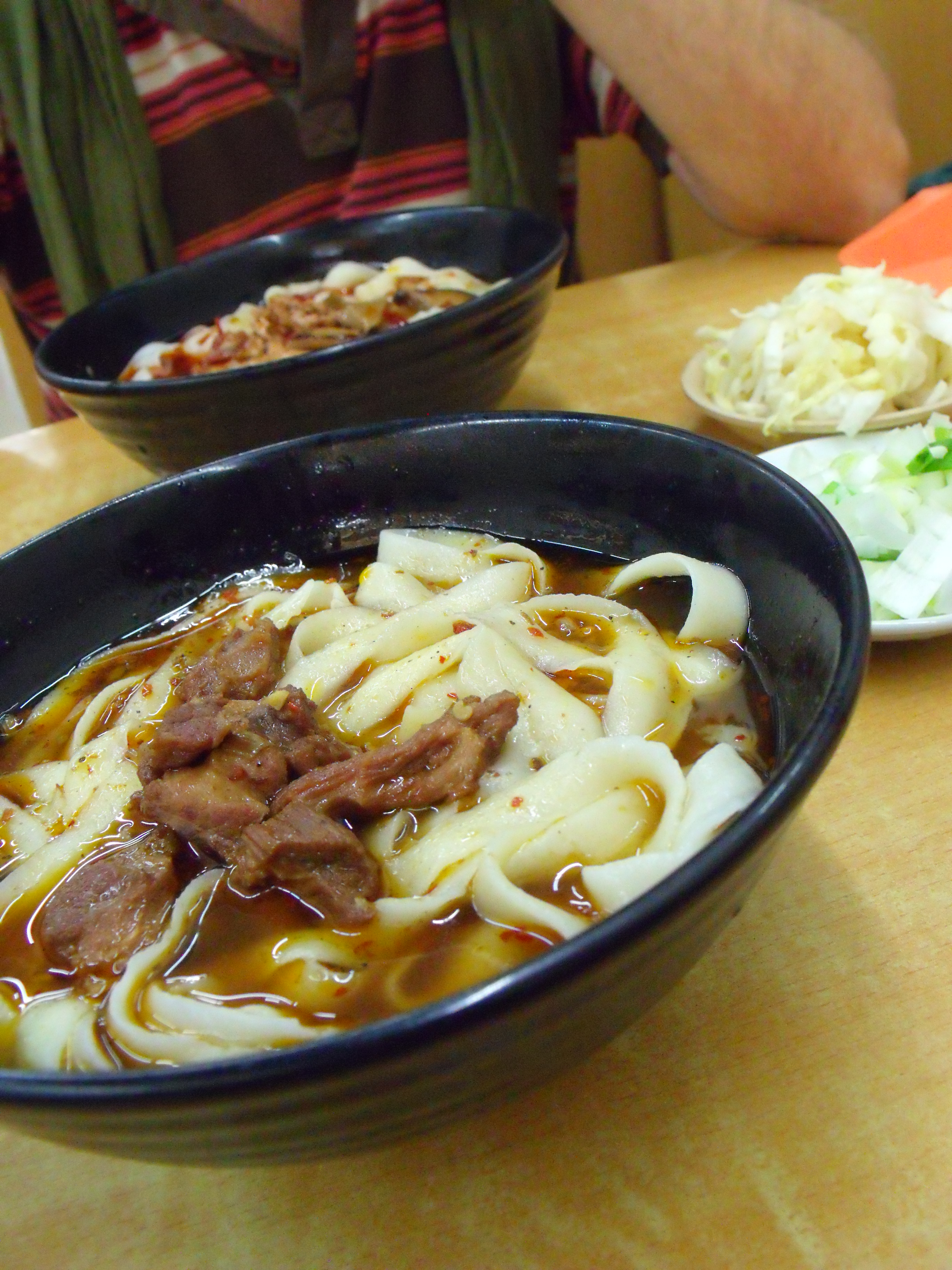
A bowl of mala beef daoxiaomian (刀削面)

Noodles may be cooked from either their fresh (moist) or dry forms. They are generally boiled, although they may also be deep-fried in oil until crispy. Boiled noodles may then be stir fried, served with sauce or other accompaniments, or served in soup, often with meat and other ingredients. Certain rice-noodles are made directly from steaming the raw rice slurry and are only consumed fresh.

Unlike many Western noodles and pastas, Chinese noodles made from wheat flour are usually made from salted dough, and therefore do not require the addition of salt to the liquid in which they are boiled. Chinese noodles also cook very quickly, generally requiring less than 5 minutes to become al dente and some taking less than a minute to finish cooking, with thinner noodles requiring less time to cook. Chinese noodles made from rice or mung bean starch do not generally contain salt.

== Types ==
=== Wheat ===
These noodles are made only with wheat flour and water. If the intended product is dried noodles, salt is almost always added to the recipe.

Common English name	Characters	Pinyin	Cantonese	Hokkien	Description
Cat's ear	貓耳朵	māo ěr duǒ	maau1 ji5do2	?	Looks like a cat's ear; similar to western Orecchiette
Cold noodles	凉面 涼麵	liáng miàn	loeng4min6	?	Served cold
Knife-cut noodles	刀削面 刀削麵	dāo xiāo miàn	dou1soek3min6	?	Relatively short flat noodle peeled by knife from a firm slab of dough
Lamian	拉麵	lā miàn	laai1min6	la-mī	Hand-pulled noodles from which ramen was derived
Yaka mein	一個麵 一家麵	yī gè miàn; yījiā miàn	jat1go3 min6; jat1gaa1 min6	?	North American Chinese style wheat noodles similar to spaghetti; sold in Canada and the United States
Lo mein	捞面 撈麵	lāo miàn	laau4min6; lou1 min6	lo mi	Egg noodles that are stir fried with sliced vegetables, meats or other seasonings
Misua	面线 麵線	miàn xiàn	min6sin3	mī-sòaⁿ	Thin, salted wheat noodles (1 mm diameter). Can be caramelized to a brown colour through extensive steaming. Similar to very fine vermicelli
Misua	宮麵	gōng miàn	gung1min6	?	Thin, salted wheat noodles (1 mm diameter). Can be caramelized to a brown colour through extensive steaming. Similar to very fine vermicelli
Saang mein	生面 生麵	shēng miàn	sang1min6	senn mī	Soapy texture
Thick noodles	粗面 粗麵	cū miàn	cou1min6	chho͘-mī	Thick wheat flour noodles, from which udon was derived

==== Lye-water or egg ====
These wheat flour noodles are more chewy in texture and yellow in color either due to the addition of lye (sodium carbonate, potassium carbonate, calcium hydroxide, or potassium hydroxide) or egg (either using only the egg white, yolk, or both). This class of lye-water noodles (Chinese: 碱面／碱麵; pinyin: jiǎn miàn) has a subtle but distinctive smell and taste, described by some as being "eggy".

Common English name	Characters	Pinyin	Cantonese	Hokkien	Description
Oil noodles	油面 油麵	yóu miàn	jau4min6	iû-mī	Made of wheat flour and egg or lye-water; often comes pre-cooked.
Thin noodles	幼面 幼麵	yòu miàn	jau3min6	iù-mī	Thin lye-water noodles; one of the most common Cantonese noodles
Mee pok	麵薄	miàn báo	min6bok6	mī-po̍k	Flat egg or lye-water noodles. Similar to tagliatelle
Yi mein	伊麵 伊府麵	yī miàn; yī fǔ miàn	ji1min6; ji1fu2 min6	i-mī i-hú-mī	Fried, chewy noodles made from wheat flour and egg or lye-water
Shrimp roe noodles	蝦子麵	xiā zǐ miàn	haa1zi2 min6	hê-tsí-mī	Made of wheat flour, lye-water, and roe, which show up as black spots
Jook-sing noodles	竹昇麵	zhú shēng miàn	zuk1 sing1 min6	tik-sing-mī	A rare type of Cantonese noodle in which the dough is tenderized with a large bamboo log

=== Rice ===
Rice-based noodles can be:

1. Extruded from a paste and steamed into strands of noodles
2. Steamed from a slurry into sheets and then sliced into strands

These noodles are typically made only with rice and water without the addition of salt. Although unorthodox, some producers may choose to add other plant starches to modify the texture of the noodles.

Common English name	Characters	Pinyin	Cantonese	Hokkien	Description
Kway teow	粿条	gǔo tiáo	gwo2tiu4	kóe-tiâu	Flat rice noodles
Ho fun, Chow fun	沙河粉	shā hé fěn	saa1ho4 fan2	sa-hô-hún	Very wide, flat, rice noodles
Ho fun, Chow fun	河粉	hé fěn	ho2fan2	hô-hún	Very wide, flat, rice noodles
Lai fun	瀨粉 酹粉	lài fěn	laai6 fan2	luā-hún	Thick round semi-transparent noodle made from sticky rice
Mixian or Mai sin	米線 米线	mǐ xiàn	mai5sin3	bee sua	Rice noodles also called Guilin mífěn (桂林米粉)
Rice vermicelli	米粉	mí fěn	mai5fan2	bí-hún	Thin rice noodles
Sanxiang noodle	三乡濑粉				Thick glutinous rice noodles

=== Starch ===
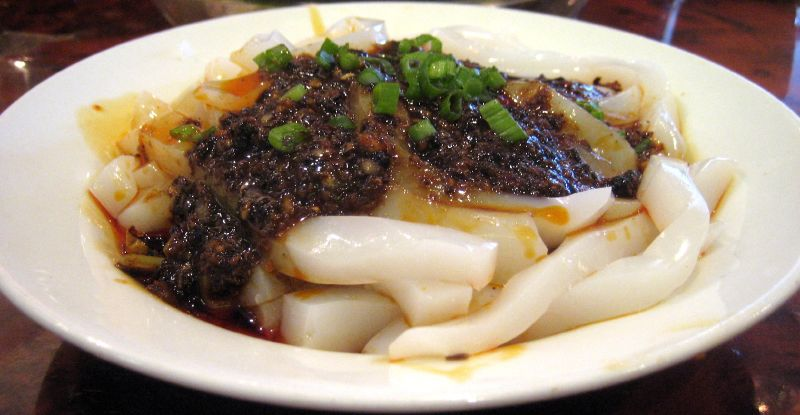
Sichuan-style liangfen (凉粉), a noodle made from pea (or rice) starch

These noodles are made using various plant starches. Mung bean starch noodles will often be cut with tapioca starch to make them more chewy and reduce production costs.

Common English name	Characters	Pinyin	Cantonese	Hokkien	Description
Winter noodles	冬粉	dōng fěn	dung1fan2	tang-hún	Very thin mung bean starch noodles, similar to vermicelli
Bean threads	粉絲	fěn sī	fan2si1	?	Thin cellophane-like noodles
Mung bean sheets	粉皮	fěn pí	fan2pei4	hún-phê	Wide, clear noodles made from mung bean starch
Liang pi	凉皮	líang pí	loeng4pei4	?	Translucent noodles made from wheat starch left from producing gluten
Silver needle noodles	銀針粉	yín zhēn fěn	ngan4 zam1fan2	?	Spindle-shaped wheat starch noodles, ca. 5 cm in length and 3–5 mm in diameter
Silver needle noodles	老鼠粉	lǎo shǔ fěn	lou5syu2 fan2	niáu-chhú-hún	Spindle-shaped wheat starch noodles, ca. 5 cm in length and 3–5 mm in diameter
Suān là fěn	酸辣粉	suān là fěn	syun1 laat6 fan2	?	Chongqing hot & spicy sweet potato starch noodles

=== Oat ===
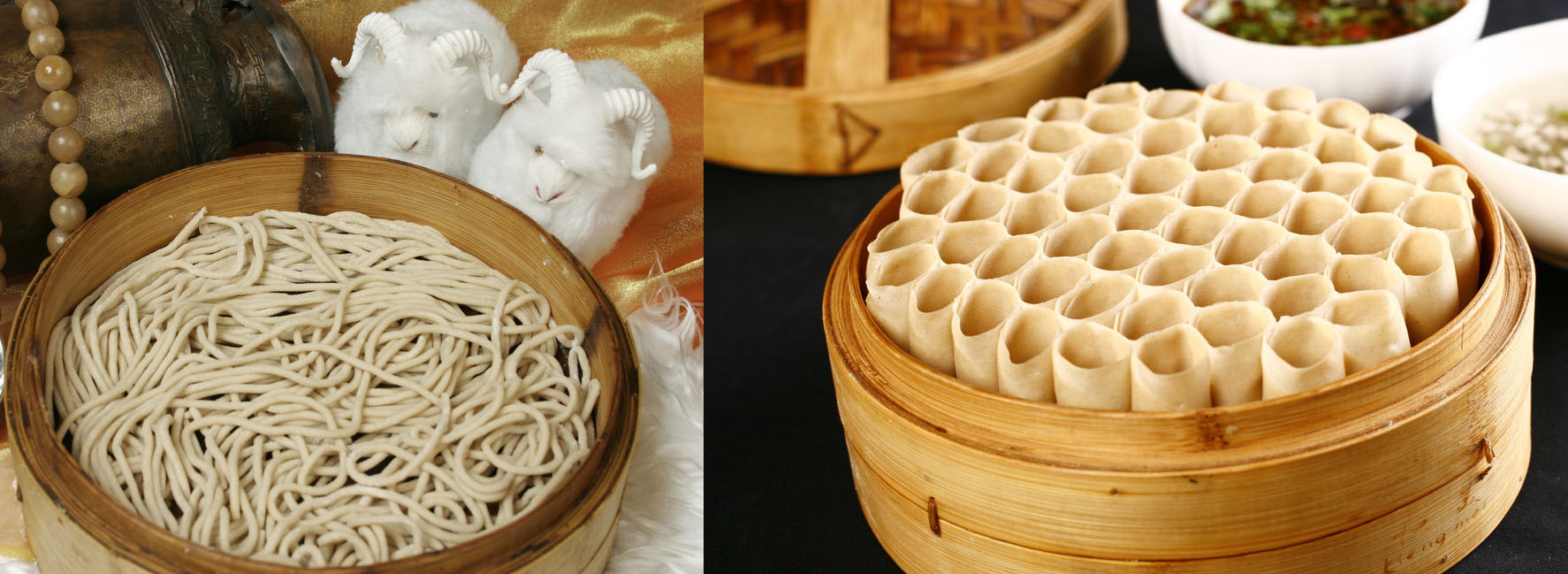
Youmian (莜面), cooked oat noodles and tubes

In China, particularly in western Inner Mongolia and Shanxi province, oat (Avena nuda) flour is called yóu miàn (莜面), and is processed into noodles or thin-walled rolls, which are consumed as staple food. The process of making oat noodles relies on twisting them on a marble plate to ensure the dough will not stick on it, and turning them into strips and thin-rolls. It can be boiled or steamed, then served with different sauces to eat.

=== Millet ===
The oldest archaeological evidence of noodles shows that they came from China and were made from millet, which is an indigenous crop to northern China. In 2005, a team of archaeologists reported finding an earthenware bowl that contained 4000-year-old noodles at the Lajia archaeological site. These noodles were said to resemble lamian, a type of Chinese noodle. Analyzing the husk phytoliths and starch grains present in the sediment associated with the noodles, they were identified as millet belonging to Panicum miliaceum and Setaria italica.

== Chinese noodle dishes ==
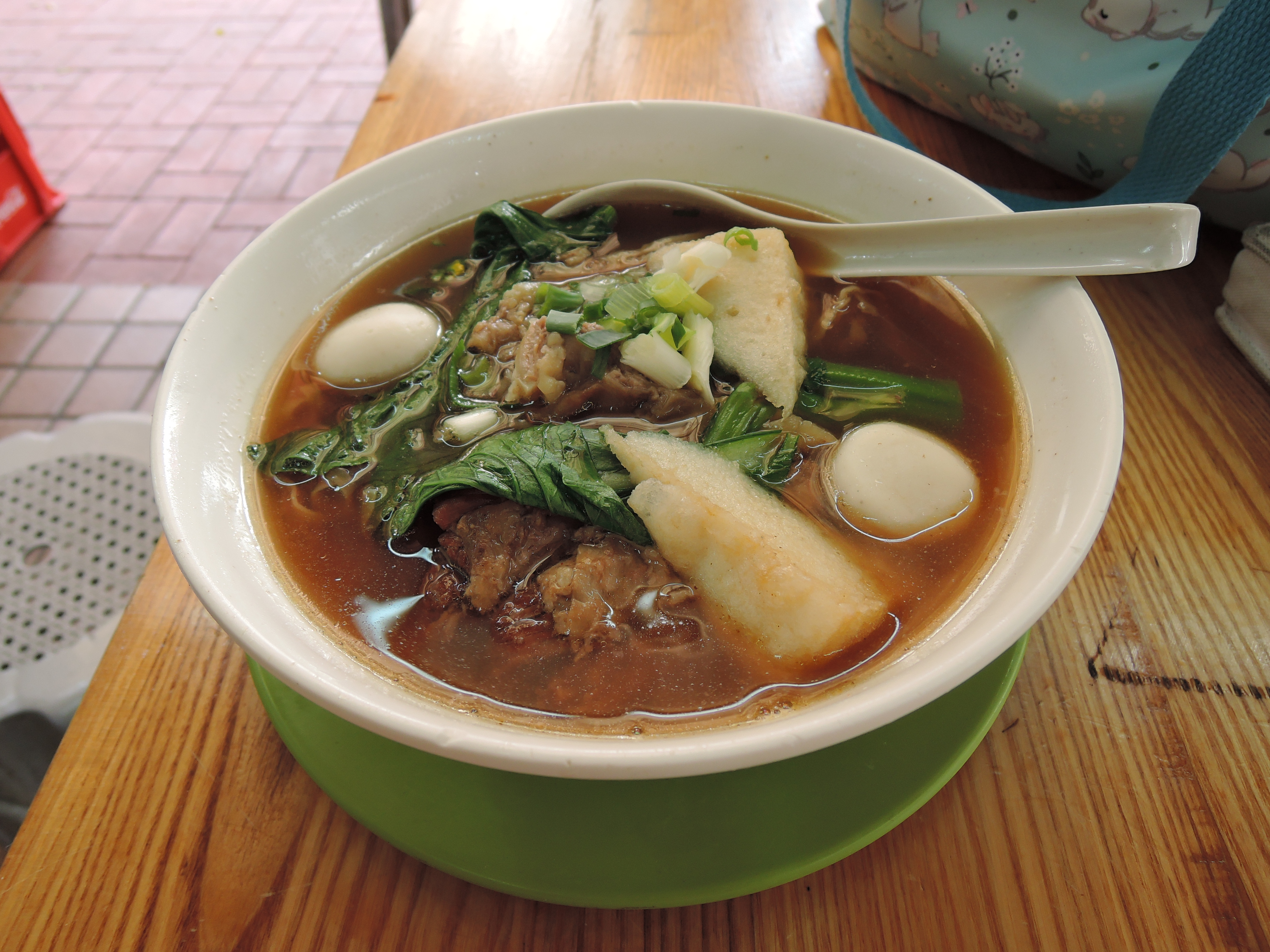
Cart noodle dishes at Chinese Noodle Shop in Yuen Long

The following are a small portion of Chinese dishes that incorporate noodles:

- Ban mian
- Beef chow fun
- Cart noodle
- Char kway teow
- Chow mein
- Laksa
- Lo mein
- Re gan mian
- Wonton noodles
- Zhajiangmian

== See also ==
- Chinese cuisine
- Japanese noodles
- Korean noodles
- Taiwanese cuisine
- List of noodles
- List of noodle dishes
- Noodle soup
