= Shrimp roe noodles =

Chinese noodle variety

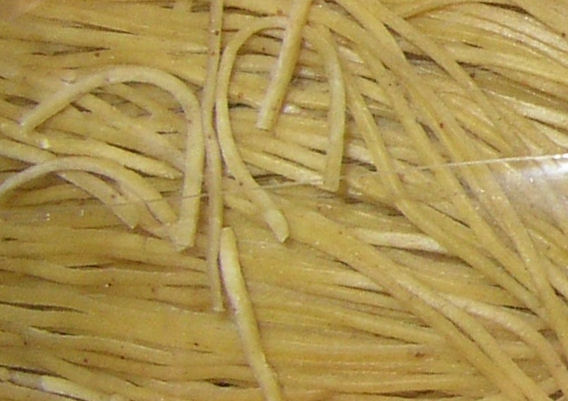
- The very tiny black dots are a trademark of the noodle.
- Alternative names: Shrimp noodles
- Type: Chinese noodles
- Place of origin: Hong Kong or Guangdong
- Region or state: Hong Kong
- Main ingredients: Shrimp roe, wheat flour, salt, tapioca flour, monosodium glutamate

Shrimp roe noodles
- Traditional Chinese: 蝦子麵
- Simplified Chinese: 虾子面
- Literal meaning: shrimp egg noodle
Transcriptions
Standard Mandarin
- Hanyu Pinyin: xiāzǐ miàn
Yue: Cantonese
- Jyutping: haa1 zi2 min6
Southern Min
- Hokkien POJ: hê-tsí-mī

Shrimp roe noodles or shrimp noodles are a variety of Chinese noodle popular in Hong Kong and Guangdong. One of the special characteristic that distinguish this noodle from the many other varieties of Chinese noodle is the salty shrimp roe forming tiny black spots on strips of the noodles.

== Production ==
The noodle is made of wheat flour, salt, tapioca flour, monosodium glutamate (MSG), and shrimp roe. It comes in a palm-sized hard noodle bundle. Mix the shrimp, eggs, flour and other materials, and then put the dough is placed into a mechanical press with holes through which the dough is forced to form strands of noodles.

== Preparation ==
Because this noodle has some taste of its own, the most common method of cooking is directly boiling the noodles. Soy sauce or additional flavorings can still be added. Depending on the noodle brand, the black dots may disappear after cooking.

== Gallery ==
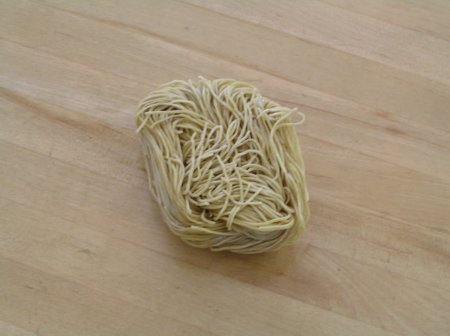
Uncooked shrimp roe noodles

== See also ==
- Chinese noodles
