= Saang mein =

Type of Chinese noodle found in Hong Kong

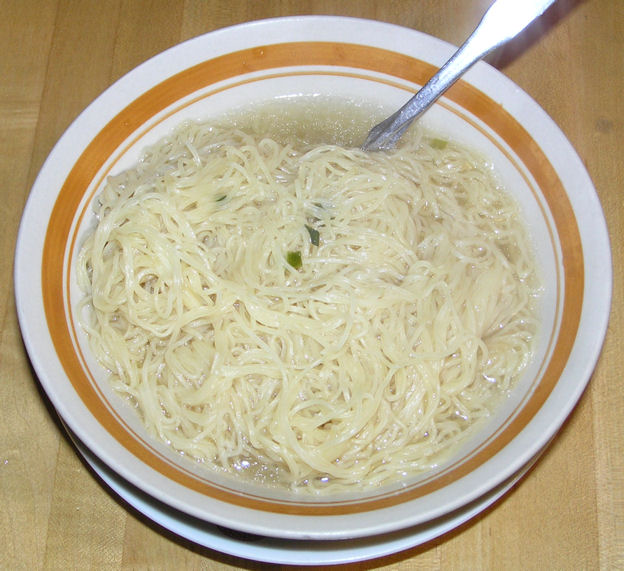
- Type: Chinese noodles
- Place of origin: Hong Kong
- Region or state: Hong Kong
- Serving temperature: Hot
- Main ingredients: Wheat flour, tapioca flour, salt, potassium carbonate, water

Saang mein
- Traditional Chinese: 生麵
- Simplified Chinese: 生面
- Literal meaning: raw noodle
Transcriptions
Standard Mandarin
- Hanyu Pinyin: shēngmiàn
Yue: Cantonese
- Jyutping: saang1 min6
Southern Min
- Hokkien POJ: senn mī

Saang mein is a type of Chinese noodle found in Hong Kong. It is often available in overseas Chinatowns.

== Production ==
It is made of wheat flour, tapioca flour, salt, potassium carbonate, and water.

== Variety ==
Saang mein can be cooked quickly similarly to ramen noodles. It is known for a more smooth and soapy texture. It can be eaten plain or with additional sesame oil. Vegetables such as kai-lan can be added. The noodle does have a wheat taste. It is served hot.

== See also ==
- Thin noodle
