= Silver needle noodles =

Variety of Chinese noodles

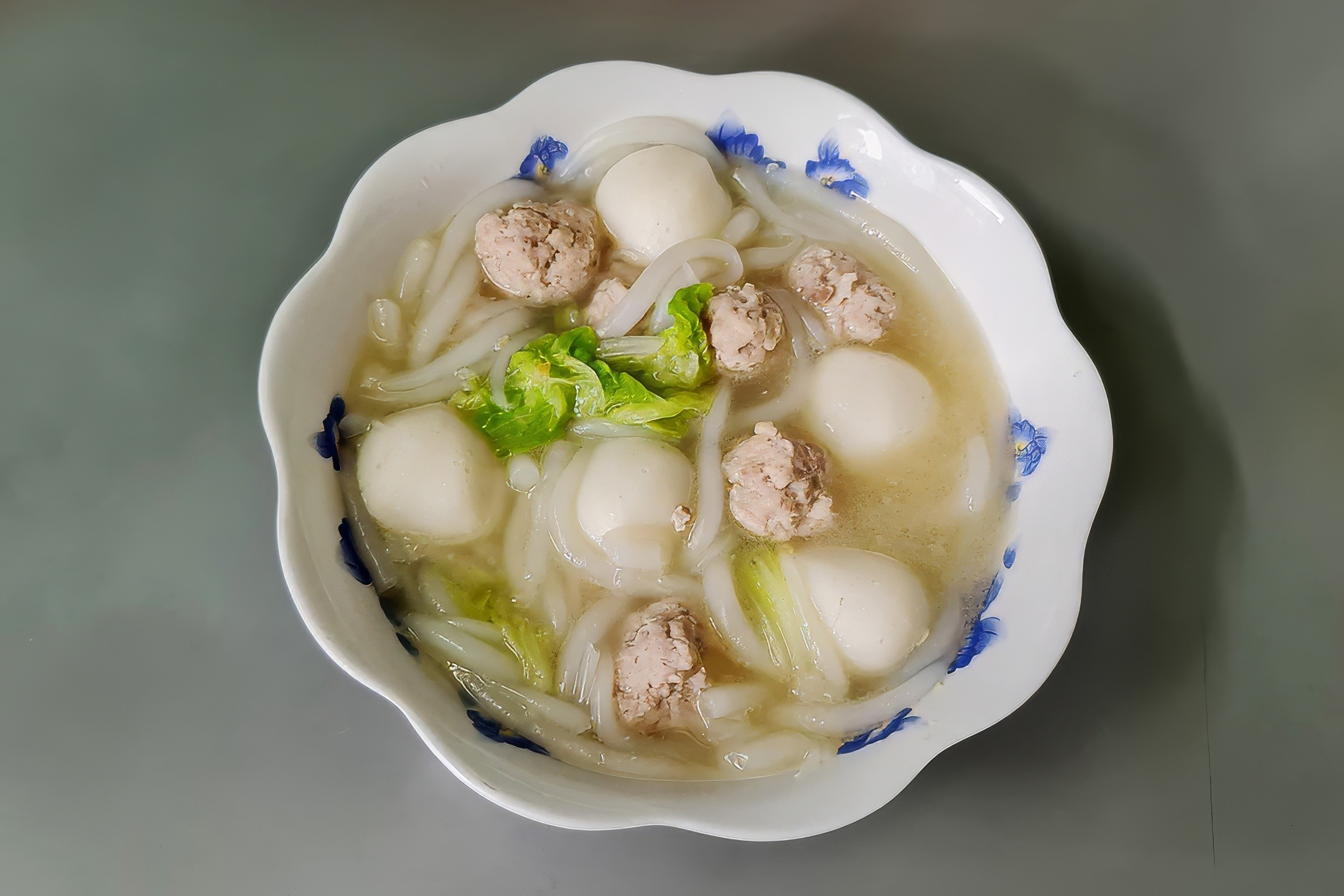
- Silver needle noodles with fish balls and minced pork balls
- Alternative names: Rat noodle
- Type: Chinese noodles
- Place of origin: China, Meizhou
- Main ingredients: Rice flour

Silver needle noodles

Chinese name
- Traditional Chinese: 銀針粉
- Simplified Chinese: 银针粉
- Literal meaning: silver needle noodle
Transcriptions
Standard Mandarin
- Hanyu Pinyin: yínzhēnfěn
Yue: Cantonese
- Jyutping: ngan4 zam1 fan2

Alternative Chinese name
- Chinese: 老鼠粉
- Literal meaning: rat noodle
Transcriptions
Standard Mandarin
- Hanyu Pinyin: lǎoshǔfěn
Yue: Cantonese
- Jyutping: lou5 syu2 fan2

Second alternative Chinese name
- Traditional Chinese: 米篩目
- Simplified Chinese: 米筛目
- Literal meaning: rice sieve eyes
Transcriptions
Southern Min
- Hokkien POJ: bí-thai-ba̍k

Vietnamese name
- Vietnamese alphabet: bánh lọt mặn

Thai name
- Thai: เกี้ยมอี๋
- RTGS: kiam-i

Khmer name
- Khmer: លត

Silver needle noodle (simplified Chinese: 银针粉; traditional Chinese: 銀針粉; pinyin: yín zhēn fěn), rat noodle (老鼠粉; lǎo shǔ fěn), bee tai bak (simplified Chinese: 米筛目; traditional Chinese: 米篩目; Pe̍h-ōe-jī: bí-thai-ba̍k), runny nose vermicelli (Chinese: 鼻涕嘜; Jyutping: bei6 tai3 mak1) or lot (Khmer: លត), giam ee (เกี้ยมอี๋) is a variety of Chinese noodle. The noodles are short, about 5 cm long and 5 mm in diameter, and white semi-transparent in colour. The noodles are available in many Chinese markets in Chinese populated areas such as Hong Kong, Taiwan, Cambodia, Indonesia, Malaysia, Brunei, Thailand, Vietnam and Singapore.

== Names ==
Quite a number of names have been used to describe the noodle. The noodle is more commonly known as silver needle noodle in Hong Kong and Taiwan, and rat noodle or "runny nose vermicelli" in Malaysia and Singapore. They are sometimes also called as pin noodles. The noodles are named as such because the shape of the noodles is long and tapered much like a rat's tail, translucent white like needles, or from the way the noodles are made by pushing them through the holes of a sieve.

- Yin Zhen Fen, Ngan Jam Fan (銀針粉/银针粉)
- Lao Shu Fen, Lou Syu Fan, Lao Cu Pan, Loh See Fun (老鼠粉)
- Bei Tai Mak (鼻涕嘜) (Cantonese)
- Bí-thai-ba̍k (米苔目/米台目/米篩目/米筛目) (Min Nan)
- Mi Shai Mu (米篩目/米筛目) (Hakka)
- Kiam I/Giam Ee (Thai)
- Short Rice Noodle
- Rice drop noodle

== Production ==
The noodles are made from a mixture of ground rice flour from glutinous or non-glutinous rice and water, but sometimes combined with cornstarch to reduce breakage during cooking. The noodles are hand-shaped and rolled into the iconic needle profile, then steamed. Shaping the noodles is an acquired skill. The noodles are made beforehand and then further prepared before serving. The noodles are only available fresh and they are made by noodle vendors or commercially produced and seldom homemade as it is too tedious to make a small amount for home consumption.

== Preparation ==
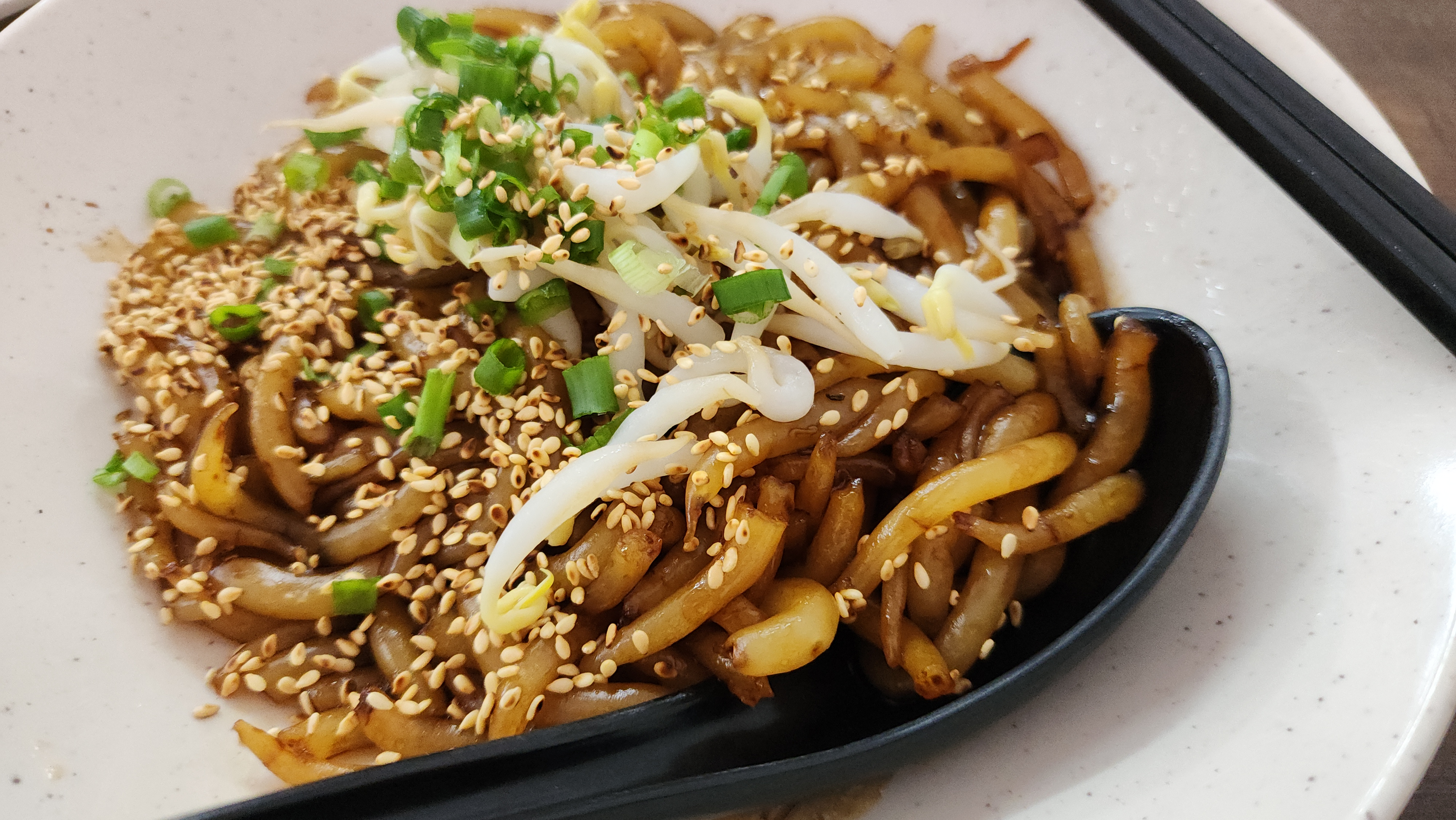
Dry Loh Shu Fun covered in dark soy sauce and topped with sesame seeds, bean sprouts and chopped chives

The noodles may be stir-fried, scalded and flavored with a mixture of sauces, cooked in soup or cooked dry in a clay-pot. As with most Chinese noodles, it can be served for breakfast, lunch or dinner as a main course or supplementing a rice meal. Many Chinese restaurants, hawkers and roadside stalls serve the noodle in various forms. The dish is often served in claypots with minced pork, prawns, and savory sauce. One of the famous dishes that can be found widely in Southeast Asia is Clay-Pot Lao Shu Fen. The purpose of using clay-pot is to keep warmth of the dish.

== See also ==
- Chinese noodles
- Lai fun
- Rice noodles
