= Lai fun =

Variety of Chinese noodles

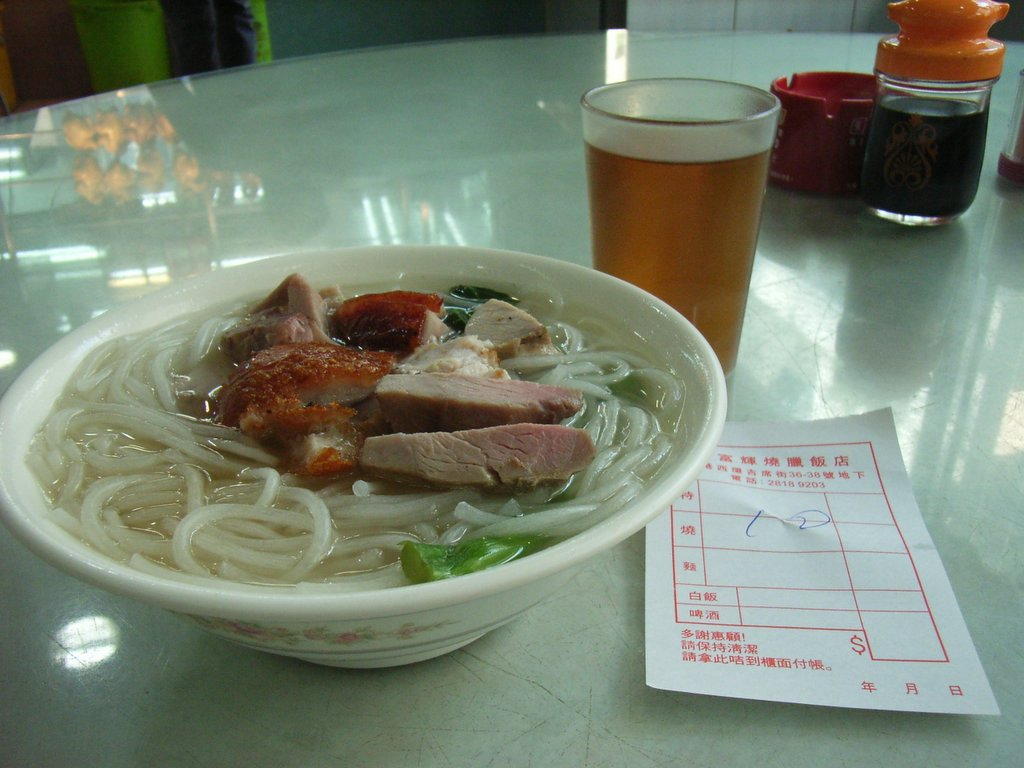
- Type: Chinese noodles
- Place of origin: China
- Variations: Bánh canh (Vietnam)

Lai fun
- Traditional Chinese: 瀨粉
- Simplified Chinese: 濑粉
Transcriptions
Standard Mandarin
- Hanyu Pinyin: lài fěn
Yue: Cantonese
- Jyutping: laai6 fan2
Southern Min
- Hokkien POJ: luā-hún

Alternative Chinese name
- Chinese: 酹粉
Transcriptions
Standard Mandarin
- Hanyu Pinyin: lài fěn
Yue: Cantonese
- Jyutping: laai6 fan2
Southern Min
- Hokkien POJ: lūi-hún

Lai fun (simplified Chinese: 濑粉; traditional Chinese: 瀨粉; Jyutping: laai6 fan2) is a short and thick variety of Chinese noodles commonly served in broth. It is commonly found in the Pearl River Delta region and to some degree amongst Chinatowns overseas. Its name comes from the Cantonese language, "lai" referring to "swift currents" and "fun" referring to "food (in this case noodles) made from starch or flour (in this case rice)".

Lai fun may also be referred to as bánh canh, a thick Vietnamese noodle, in which case it is made from rice flour and tapioca starch.

== Production ==
Lai fun noodles are often made from rice flour and/or tapioca starch and are available in short or long varieties. It is said that the original method of making lai fun was done in the old days when resources were scarce and the people of Guangzhou would dry overnight rice, grind it into rice flour, mix it into a paste, then sieve it into boiling water to cook.

=== Regional variations ===
There are several regional variations on the way lai fun is prepared and eaten.

==== Guangzhou ====
- Lai fun is made by the Luocun community in the Guangming district by pouring glutinous rice milk into boiling water through a bamboo tube then cooled in cold water, resulting in its chewy texture. The noodles are often served with roast goose in the Gongming Subdistrict.
- In the town of Magang in Kaiping city, lai fun is produced by rubbing rice flour in appropriately warm water into dough and pressing the dough into strips with a diameter of about 2 millimeters. The noodles are boiled then soaked in cold water to cool. In the past, the process of pressing the dough into strips was done by hand by passing them through a wooden trough; in modern times, the process is now completed by machines with greater output.
- Lai fun is often eaten during the Mid-Autumn Festival in Enping county along with mooncakes in order to worship and celebrate the moon. The making of lai fun is a community effort that emphasizes the helping of neighbors and reunion of family and friends; it involves manually grinding glutinous rice into flour, rubbing the flour into dough, boiling and assembling the dough, pressing the dough through a trough, making the noodles, leaving the noodles to dry, and more.
- Lai fun was brought to the Dapeng district of Shenzhen city during the Ming dynasty by soldiers who largely came from southern provinces and enjoyed eating rice noodles. Limited by the conditions of the military camp, they would grind rice that had been soaked in water with a stone mortar, mix the powder with other types of flour, add cold water to make a paste, and pour it into a coconut shell. They would then drill a hole of about 2 centimeters into the coconut shell and continuously shake until the rice noodle paste flowed directly into boiling water below, to which they'd add oil, salt, and seasonings before eating. In modern times, lai fun is made with high quality early-season rice and a stone pestle that makes the pounded noodles more delicate and is often served with fresh pork, chicken, and other related foods. Dapeng fortress' unique location on the coast of the South China sea means that seafood is also often added to the dish, sea urchin being one of the most popular and distinctive types.
- In the town of Xiguan, lai fun is made with rice, glutinous rice flour, and water mixed into a paste. In place of the typical process of extrusion, the rice paste is poured freely into the water instead, which eventually forms into thick, short strips of noodles with a softer texture. Traditional Guangzhou lai fun uses pork bone broth and rice slurry to form the soup base and is often served with mushrooms, pickled vegetables, dried shrimp, and fragrant bits of lard, while radish and cilantro are added after to the customer's liking.

==== Hong Kong ====
Lai fun in Hong Kong has a more bouncy texture and is often served with roast goose, which lends both the noodles and broth a deeper flavor.

== Comparison ==
Lai fun, a short and thick style of noodle, has a very similar appearance with silver needle noodles. One way to distinguish the two is to look at the ends of each lai fun piece. The ends of lai fun noodles are often cut straight down as opposed to leaving a tapering "tail."

== Gallery ==
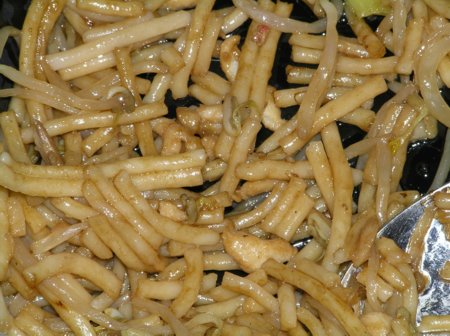
These noodles have been stir-fried; therefore, they have been broken into shorter pieces during the process.

== See also ==
- Rice noodles
