= Youmian =

Variety of Chinese noodle

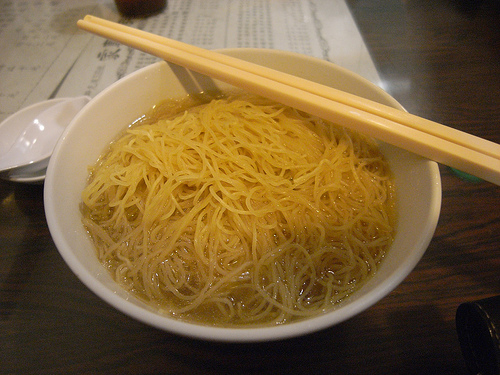
- Traditional Chinese: 幼麵
- Simplified Chinese: 幼面
- Literal meaning: thin noodle
Transcriptions
Standard Mandarin
- Hanyu Pinyin: yòu miàn
Yue: Cantonese
- Jyutping: jau3 min6
Southern Min
- Hokkien POJ: iù-mī

Youmian (lit. 'thin noodles') are a variety of Chinese noodle widely used in Southern China, especially in the cuisines of Hong Kong and Guangdong. It has also been selectively used in the dishes of Shanghai, Malaysia, and Singapore. Youmian is also used in some dishes in overseas Chinese communities.

== Description ==
Thin noodles are generally made with eggs.

A well-known variety of thin noodles is called cyun daan min (Cantonese; translating roughly as "whole egg noodles"). This variety is almost exclusively found in East and Southeast Asia, in regions with sizable Chinese populations.

== Use in dishes ==
Depending on the cuisine, thin noodles may be boiled with some type of broth or stir-fried in a wok.

== List of use in dishes ==
- Wonton noodle
- Lo mein
- Beef ball noodle
- Fish ball noodle
- Fish slice noodle

== See also ==
- Chinese noodles
- Oil noodles
- Saang mein
