= Sanxiang noodle =

Chinese noodle dish

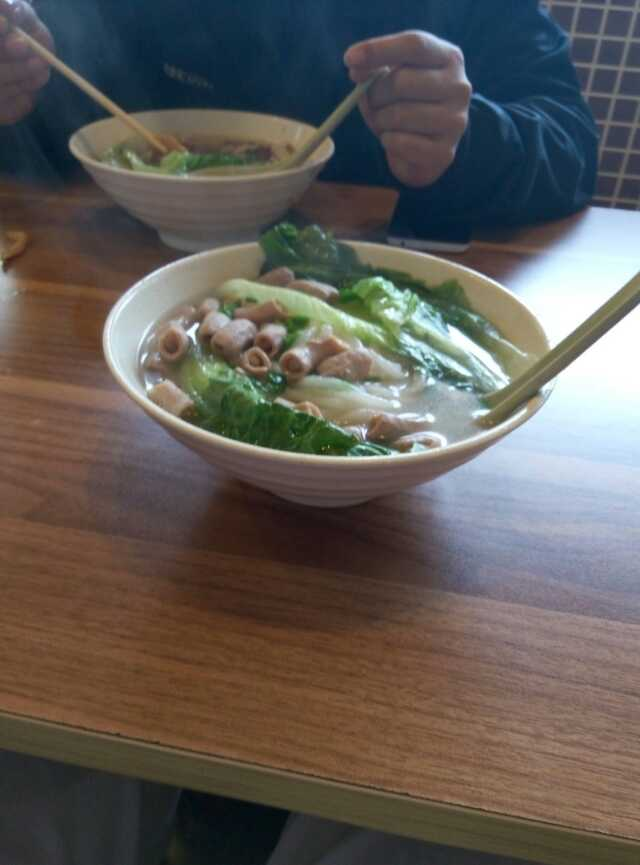
Sanxiang noodle with pig oviduct

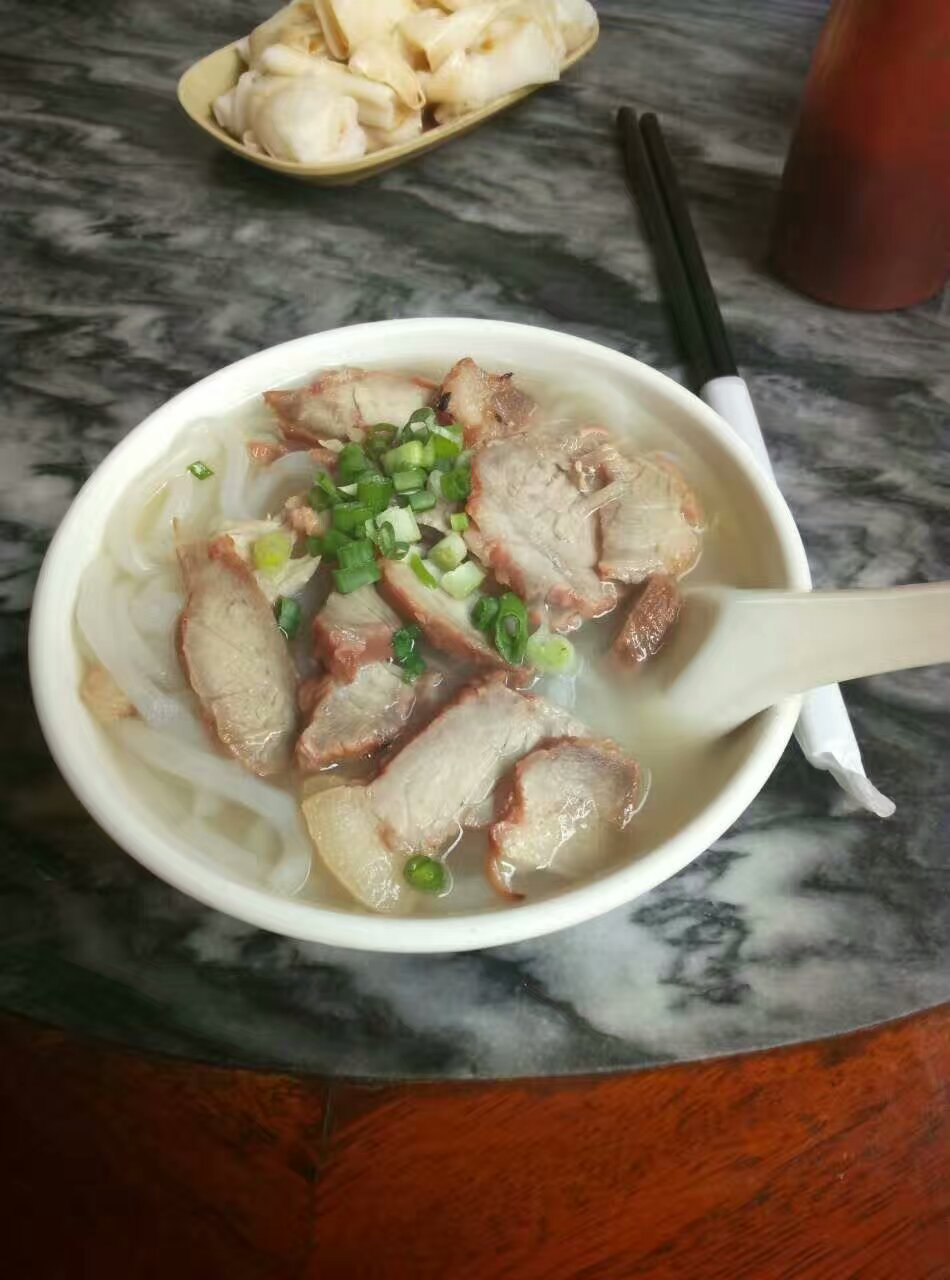
Sanxiang noodle roast pork

Sanxiang noodle (Chinese: 三乡濑粉) is one of the famous local foods of Zhongshan city, Guangdong province, China. It has a history of more than 200 years. Because of the special recipe and techniques, the noodle is round and stretchy, which is similar to Guiling noodle, another well-known noodle of China. There are many different types of sanxiang noodle according to people's favor. People usually eat it with the company of meat, chicken, vegetables, roast pork, pork liver and so on. It can boiled as well as fried.

== History ==
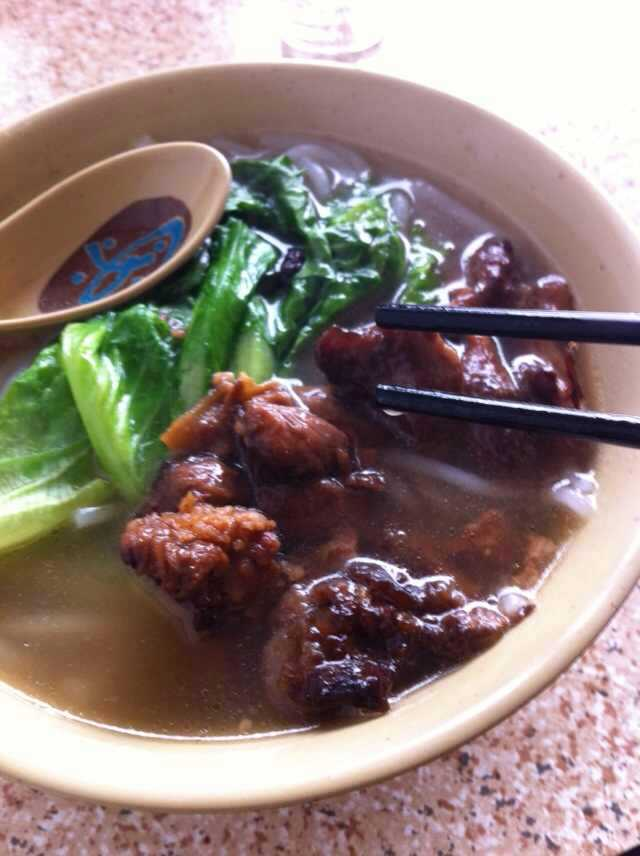
Sanxiang noodle with beef

Sanxiang noodle has a history of more than 200 years. It originated from a small village in a town called Baishihuang (“白石环”). The noodle is majorly made by glutinous rice. When the ancestor in Baishihuang was making noodle, they used spring water from the mountain. Whenever the festivals came, the local people celebrated them with this special food. In lunar July 14, everybody in the village ate this special noodle for breakfast and lunch. It is said that this kind of noodle symbolizes good luck because its length and shape. Since the 1980s, the food department of the city has built factories for exporting Sanxiang noodle. Thanks for this, Sanxiang noodle has become one of the five famous brands of noodle in Guangdong province.

== Preparation ==
=== Traditional ===
About 150 years ago, Sangxiang noodles consisted mainly of rice, and especially overnight rice, as wasting food was incredibly frowned upon. To create the dish, the rice was first placed under the sun, dehydrating the grain of any moisture. This dried rice was then crushed into powder. Mixed with fresh fountain water, the powder would be kneaded into dough. The final step was to shape this dough into the size of slim noodles and prepare for future meals.

=== Modern ===
Nowadays, the traditional methods of making Sanxiang noodles are rarely used because of the huge demand of the market and the development of technology. Machines that make Sanxiang noodles have been vastly applied. Besides, the recipes of making Sanxiang noodles has also been updated because of the diversity of food and people's appetite.
