= Mung bean sheets =

Type of Chinese noodle

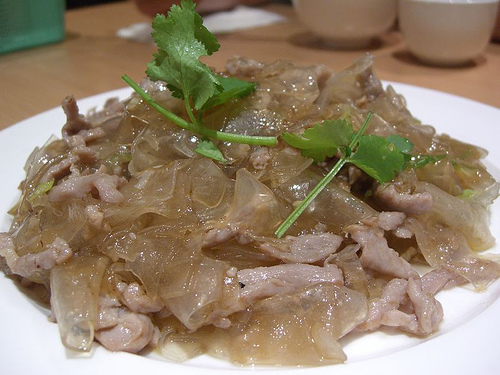
- Fan pei or "fan pi" stir-fried with pork
- Type: Chinese noodles
- Place of origin: China
- Main ingredients: Mung beans

Mung bean sheets
- Chinese: 粉皮
- Literal meaning: noodle skin
Transcriptions
Standard Mandarin
- Hanyu Pinyin: fěn pí
Yue: Cantonese
- Jyutping: fan2 pei4
Southern Min
- Hokkien POJ: hún-phê

Alternative Chinese name
- Traditional Chinese: 綠豆粉皮
- Simplified Chinese: 绿豆粉皮
- Literal meaning: mung bean noodle skin
Transcriptions
Standard Mandarin
- Hanyu Pinyin: lǜ dòu fěn pí
Yue: Cantonese
- Jyutping: luk6 dau6*2 fan2 pei4
Southern Min
- Hokkien POJ: li̍k-tāu-hún-phê

Mung bean sheets are a type of Chinese noodle. It is transparent, flat, and sheet-like. They can be found, in dried form, in China and occasionally in some Chinatowns overseas.

== Description ==
Similar to cellophane noodles, mung bean sheets are made of mung beans, except they are different in shape. The sheets are approximately 1 cm wide, like fettuccine noodles. They are produced in the Shandong province of eastern China (where cellophane noodles are also produced), as well as in the northern city of Tianjin, and have a springier, chewier texture than the thinner noodles.

== Use in dishes ==
Mung bean sheets are used for cold dishes, hot pots, and stir-fried dishes, in conjunction with sliced meats and/or seafood, vegetables, and seasonings. One such dish is liang fen, where the noodles are served cold with chili oil.
