= Chinkiang pot cover noodles =

Chinese wheat noodle dish

- Type: Noodle
- Region or state: Zhenjiang, Jiangsu, China
- Serving temperature: Hot

The Chinkiang pot-cover noodle (Chinese: 镇江锅盖面; pinyin: Zhènjiānguogàimiàn) is a Chinese dish popular in Zhenjiang, Jiangsu. The dish is notable for its peculiar method of cooking, as the noodles are boiled with a small wooden lid floating in the cooking pot. The lid, typically made of fir, is said to impart a particular aroma on the noodles. Pot-lid noodles are typically served with toppings such as pork, eel, vinegar, soy sauce, garlic, and scallions.

== Legends ==
One story of the dish's origins holds that, long ago, a wooden pot lid accidentally fell into a boiling pot of noodles as a woman prepared dinner for her husband. The husband enjoyed the taste of these noodles so much that he began to sell them, calling them "pot-cover noodles." Chefs say that boiling the noodles with a wooden lid enhances the aroma.

Another story, dating from the 1700s, recounts that the Qianlong Emperor stopped to eat at a restaurant while visiting Zhenjiang. The restaurant owner, nervous to cook for such a distinguished guest, accidentally dropped a sandalwood pot lid into a boiling pot of noodles. The Emperor enjoyed the noodles and complimented the chef, hence the beginning of the tradition.
