= Oil noodles =

Type of Chinese noodles

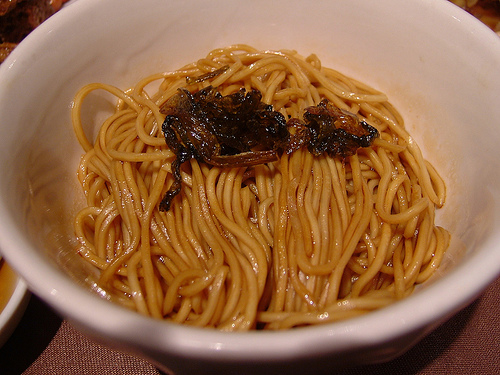
- Shanghai oil noodles
- Alternative names: Cooked noodles
- Type: Chinese noodles
- Place of origin: China
- Main ingredients: Wheat flour, eggs, corn oil, sodium benzoate

Oil noodles
- Traditional Chinese: 油麵
- Simplified Chinese: 油面
- Literal meaning: oil noodle
Transcriptions
Standard Mandarin
- Hanyu Pinyin: yóumiàn
Yue: Cantonese
- Jyutping: jau4 min6
Southern Min
- Hokkien POJ: iû-mī

Oil noodles or cooked noodles are a type of Chinese noodles. They are sometimes used in Cantonese cuisine.

== Production ==
Oil noodles are made of wheat flour, eggs, egg whites, salt, corn oil, and sodium benzoate. In Hong Kong, United States and Canada, this is called yow mein if it is cylindrical in shape, and has a circular, or roundish cross-section. If it has a squarish cross-section, it is called mein. In Singapore, this is called mee. Used in Malay and Indonesian dishes, it is called mee after the Hokkien pronunciation of the word. It is also a popular dish in Burma, where it is called sigyet khauk swè, and was introduced by the Sino-Burmese community. In Southeast Asia, this type of noodle is often served with seafood or poultry and pork, while in Hong Kong and in China, it is often served In street food and street carts called "cart noodles". It is never served with chicken in Hong Kong. In Taiwan, as in Mandarin-speaking China, it is known as mian. In native Taiwanese Hoklo, it is known as mi, as opposed to bee which means "rice grains" that is uncooked.

== Preparation ==
Oil noodles requires 15 minutes to cook and are relatively easy to make. First, some noodles and seasonal vegetables should be boiled in the same pot; then, they should be transferred to a bowl with some seasonings. As a final step, a couple of tablespoons of hot oil should be poured over everything, and then the contents of the bowl mixed.

== Nutritional value ==
The noodles used in for oil noodles are hand-refined with high-quality flour, tea oil, potato powder, salt, and a variety of other materials. It is as thin as a hairspring and has the characteristics of refreshing but not greasy, slippery but not sticky, non-sticky in the mouth, and easy to digest.

== History ==
There are two versions of the history of oil noodles. The first version is that the oil noodle was seen in the market in the late Ming Dynasty. Then it was selected as court food in the Qing Dynasty, so they are called "Longxu tribute noodles". "Longxu" means "the beard of the dragon", and the dragon is a symbol of the Chinese emperor.

The second version is that a long time ago, a farmer's family walked and died to avoid the war. Only the grandfather and grandson remained dependent on each other. Due to years of drought and wars, crops had not been harvested. In order to survive the famine, Grandpa went hunting in the mountains every day. In a cold winter, Grandpa went out for half a day to hunt back a fat wild goat. Both grandma and grandpa enjoyed it until after the Spring Festival. Due to the heat, most of the leftover mutton could not be eaten. For storage, Grandpa thought of a way to cut the remaining mutton into chunks and store it after the oil exploded. When cooking, each time the oiled mutton and dried vegetables were fried into a dish, and it was mixed with potato noodles, corn noodles, and wheat noodles. The noodles made not only solved the food for the two people to survive the famine, but also made the little grandson shouted after eating. Later, the little grandson started a business and never forgets his grandfather's noodles with oil and meat. In order to commemorate his late grandfather, he opened a restaurant called "Fried Pork Noodles" in Qitai Lihuajian. When the guests ate, they all praised it. From then on, "Gao You Po Noodles" became famous, and it continues to this day.

== Variety ==
Most oil noodles require boiling or cooking; however, some varieties can be purchased already cooked. The noodles can be served hot or cold; additionally, sauce, meat, broth or vegetables can be added.

In Shanghai, a popular preparation is scallion oil noodles (cōng yóu bàn miàn, 葱油拌面), which consists of thin noodles tossed in a sauce of reduced soy sauce and sugar and topped with scallion oil and the remaining deep-fried scallions used in its production.

== See also ==
- Youmian
