= Banmian =

Chinese noodle dish

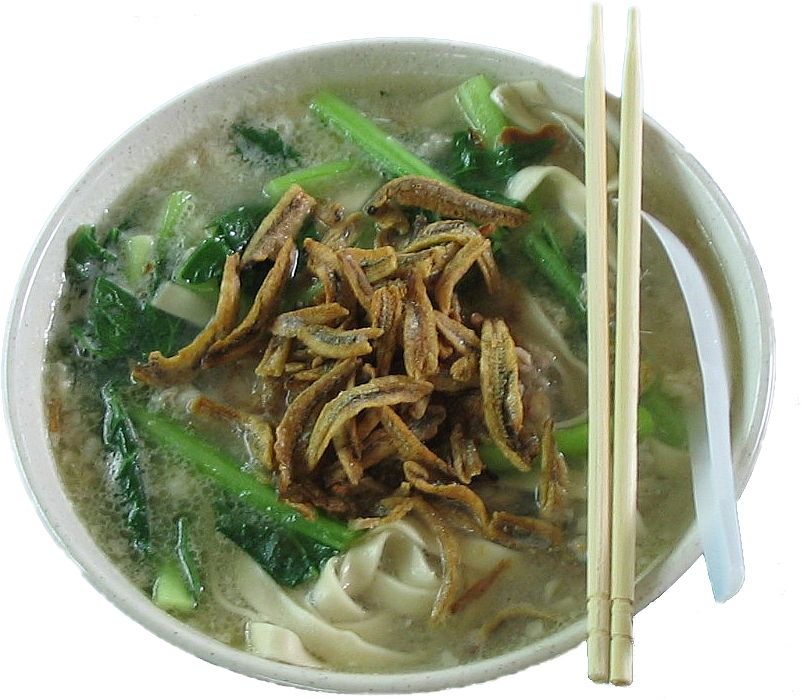
- Banmian in Singapore
- Course: Main
- Region or state: China and Hokkien-speaking areas (such as Malaysia, Singapore and Taiwan)
- Main ingredients: Flat egg noodles, vegetables, anchovy, fish or meat

Mian fen guo
- Course: Main
- Region or state: China and Hokkien-speaking areas (such as Malaysia, Singapore and Taiwan)
- Main ingredients: Flat egg noodles, vegetables (mainly sayur manis or cangkuk manis), anchovy, fish or minced meat, asam jawa

Banmian
- Traditional Chinese: 板麵
- Simplified Chinese: 板面
- Hokkien POJ: pán-mī
Transcriptions
Standard Mandarin
- Hanyu Pinyin: bǎn miàn
Hakka
- Pha̍k-fa-sṳ: pán-mén
Southern Min
- Hokkien POJ: pán-mī

Banmian (traditional Chinese: 板麵; simplified Chinese: 板面; pinyin: bǎnmiàn) or pan mee (Min Nan Chinese: pán-mī) is a Chinese noodle dish that consists of handmade noodles served in soup. Other types of handmade noodles include youmian (similar dough texture and taste, but thinner round noodles), or mee hoon kueh (flat and thin rectangular pieces).

The name banmian ('board noodle' or 'block noodle') came from the Hakka method of cutting the noodles into straight strands using a wooden block as ruler. In Hakka, some might call it man-foon-char-guo (麵粉茶粿) or dao-ma-chet (刀嬤切).

In Hokkien, it was called mee-hoon-kueh (麵粉粿; lit. 'wheat snack') but what can be found at hawker stalls is generally called banmian. The current style is a mix between the traditional methods of Hakka and Hokkien. The Hakka initially made the noodle by shaving pieces off a block of dough, commonly made from flour (sometimes egg is added for more flavor), while the Hokkien would roll the dough into a large, flat piece that would then be torn by hand into bite-sized bits. Traditionally, the dough is hand-kneaded and torn into smaller pieces of dough (about 5 cm or 2 in). The dough can also be kneaded using the machine into a variety of shapes, the most common shape being flat strips of noodle.

Banmian is common in China, Malaysia, Singapore and Taiwan. It consists of egg noodles served in a flavorful soup, often with meat or fish, vegetables and spices. Dried anchovies, minced pork, mushrooms, and a leafy vegetable such as sweet potato leaves or sayur manis (Sauropus androgynus) are also possible ingredients.

Traditional versions of banmian use egg noodles that are simply a blend of egg, flour, water and salt that is kneaded and then formed into noodles. However, modern banmian is frequently made with a pasta maker which cuts noodles in all sizes.

The base of the soup can be water, but is more commonly a type of fish stock. Normal fish stock can be used, but anchovy stock is a common choice. Various ingredients such as onions, garlic, ginger and bean paste can be added to the stock to provide more flavor, although some preparations are so simple that nothing more than plain stock is used. In Malaysia, dry noodles and soup are served separately.

Dry chilli pan mee is a variant which was invented in Chow Kit, Kuala Lumpur, and is often seen in the Klang Valley. This dry noodle is served with minced pork, fried onions, anchovies, and topped with a poached egg which is later stirred into the noodles. It is usually served with dry chilli or sambal.

Two common ingredients that are often found across different versions of banmian are mushrooms and anchovies. The exact type of each might vary, but they are generally added to the stock base. The mushrooms can be dried and are reconstituted in the broth, while the anchovies may be fried until crispy and then served on top of the soup. The anchovies also can be added to the stock for flavor and allowed to break down during cooking.

Once the base stock is completed, nearly anything can be added to complete the banmian. This includes vegetables such as green onions, spinach, cabbage and bamboo shoots. Vinegar is usually added, occasionally with sugar, to balance the flavor. Restaurants may offer fried minced pork or chunks of white fish as a protein-rich addition. Finally, an egg is cracked into the hot broth and allowed to cook until the white is set and the yolk is warmed through.

== See also ==
- Chinese noodles
- List of Chinese soups
- List of soups
