= Knife-cut noodles =

Shanxi noodles

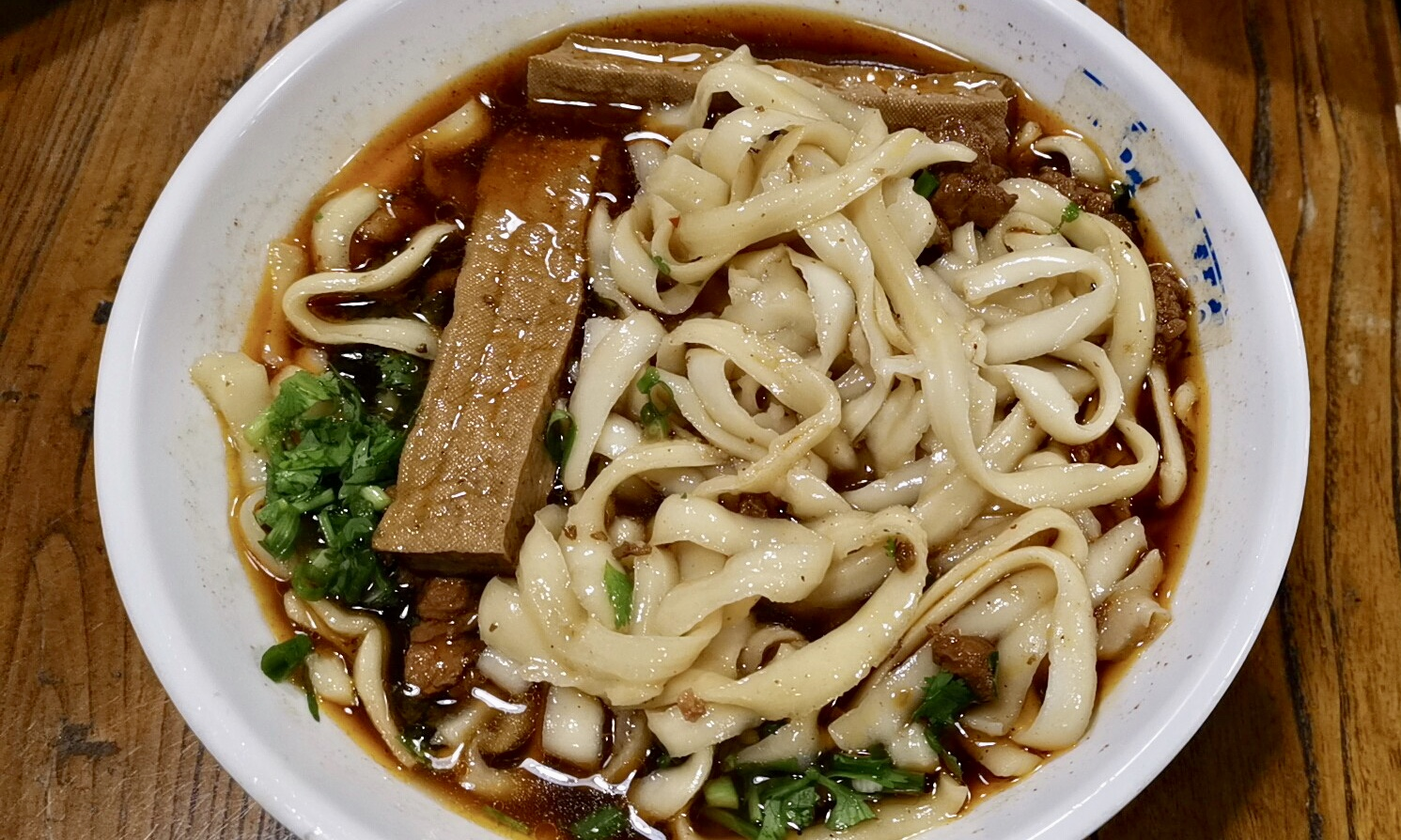
- Knife-cut noodles in beef broth
- Place of origin: Shanxi, China
- Main ingredients: flour, oil, water
- Ingredients generally used: salt, sugar, soda ash

Knife-cut noodles (traditional Chinese: 刀削麵; simplified Chinese: 刀削面; pinyin: dāoxiāomiàn), also known as knife-sliced noodles or knife-shaved noodles in English, are a type of noodle in Chinese cuisine often associated with Shanxi province. As the name implies, unlike pulled noodles, they are prepared by thinly cutting a block of dough directly into boiling water. The resulting noodles are ribbon-shaped, fairly thick, and chewy when cooked. Among the knife-cut noodle variations in Shanxi, the style from Datong became the most famous.

== Preparation ==
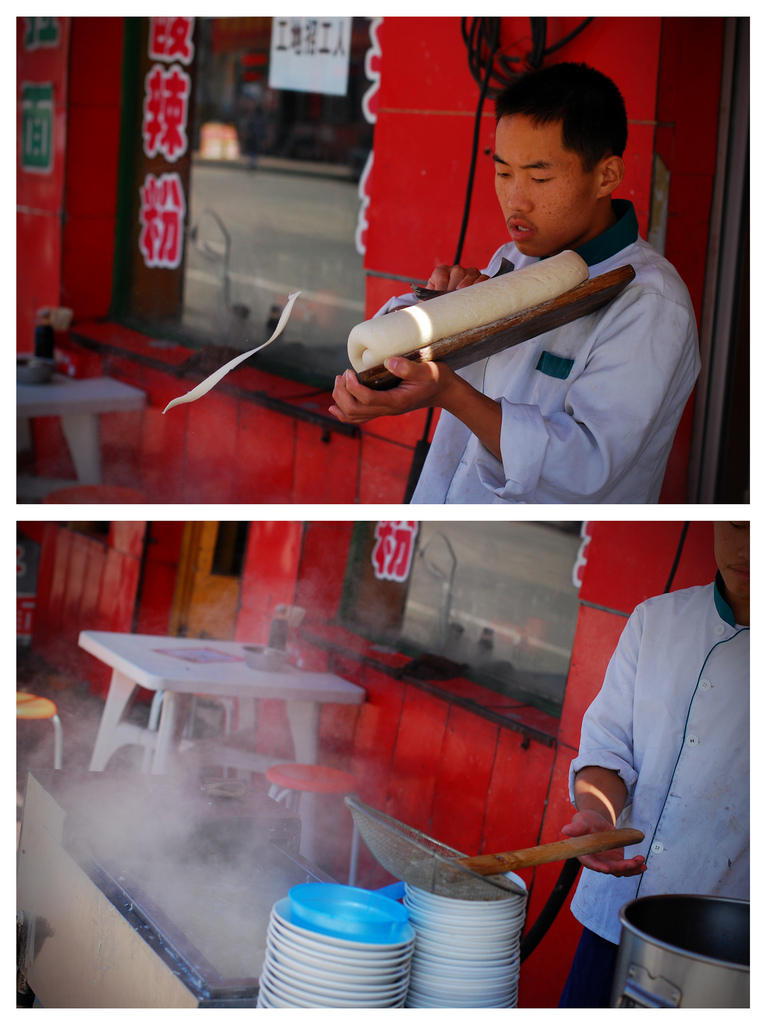
Cutting knife-cut noodles in Datong, Shanxi

The noodles are made by mixing water and flour, and other ingredients to create dough. Cooking oil is added to increase elasticity and chewiness. After resting, the dough chunk is then sliced in a quick motion with strips of dough going directly into the boiling water. Learning the technique to do this can take years, but a skilled chef can slice up to 200 strands per minute. This makes the noodles very fresh.

The noodles are usually served in broth, but they are sometimes fried.
