= Jook-sing noodles =

Type of Chinese egg noodle

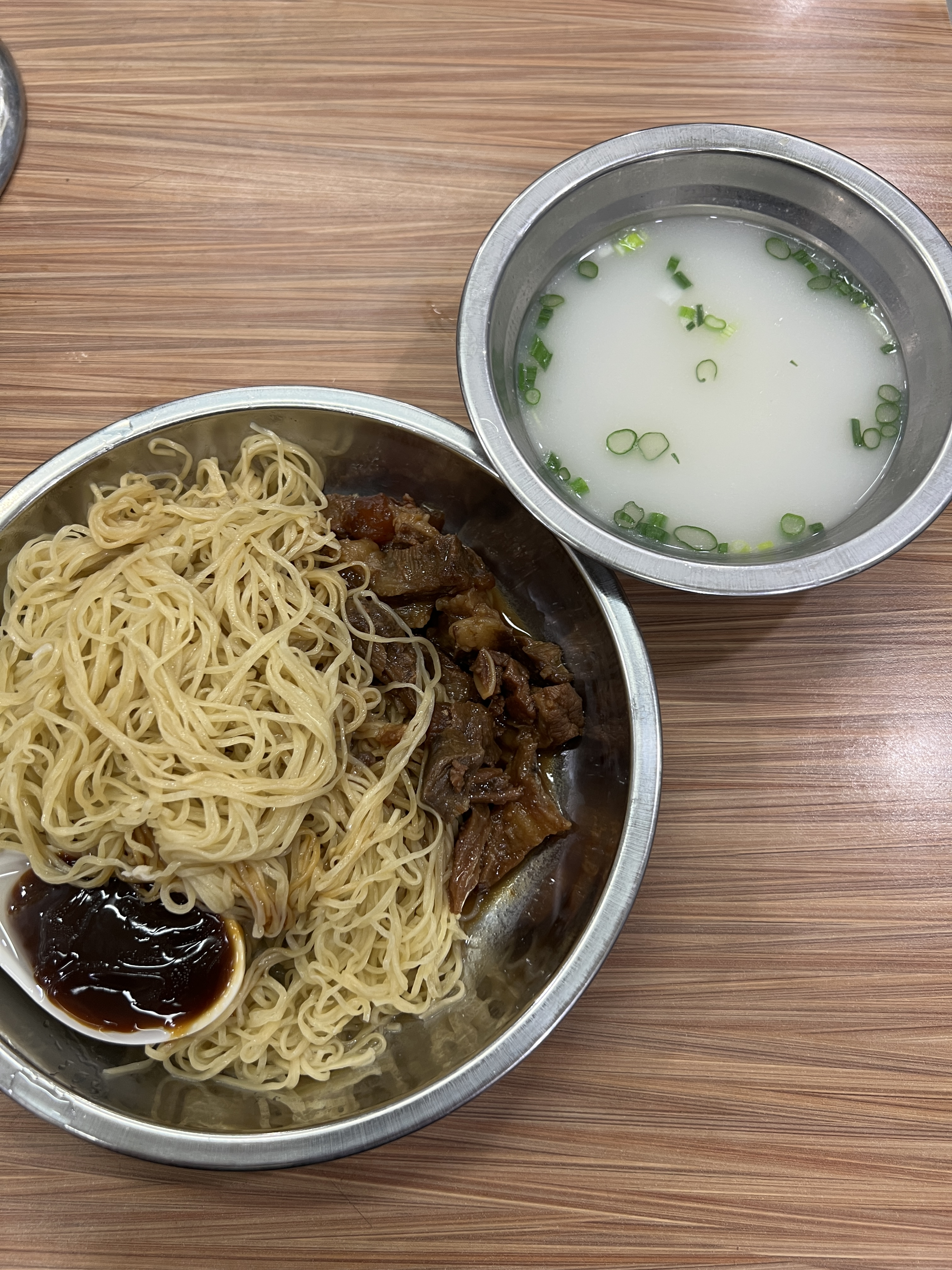
- Type: Cantonese noodles
- Place of origin: China
- Main ingredients: Flour, eggs (traditionally duck eggs)

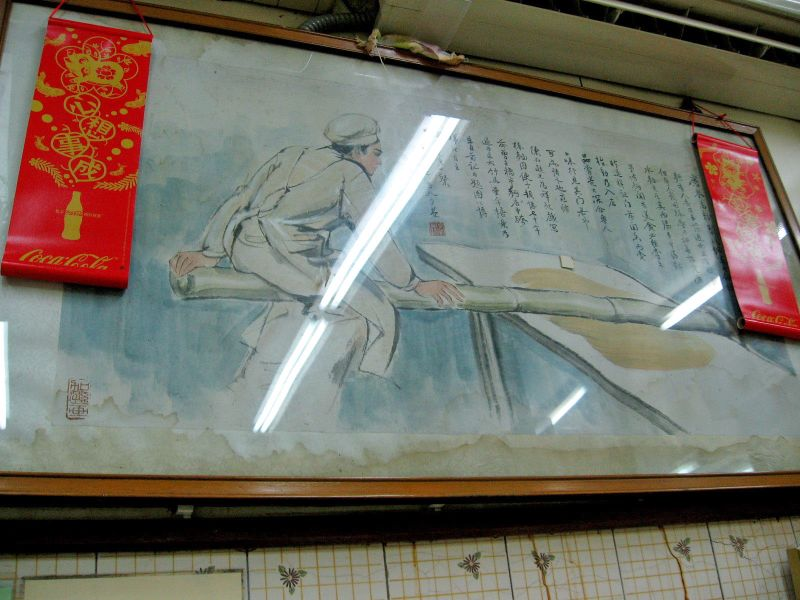
Chef making the noodles in the traditional method

Jook-sing noodles
- Traditional Chinese: 竹昇麵
- Simplified Chinese: 竹升面
- Jyutping: zuk1 sing1 min6
- Literal meaning: bamboo rise noodle
Transcriptions
Standard Mandarin
- Hanyu Pinyin: zhúshēng miàn
Yue: Cantonese
- Jyutping: zuk1 sing1 min6
Southern Min
- Hokkien POJ: tik-sing-mī

Jook-sing noodles is a rare type of Cantonese noodle found in some parts of Hong Kong, Macau, and some parts of Canton in Guangdong province, China.

== Description ==
The noodle is made with eggs, traditionally made with duck egg, and is considered one of the rarer noodles in existence. Historically the chef rides a bamboo log to press the eggs, flour, and other ingredients together. As of 2008 in Hong Kong, only a few restaurants are left that make the noodles in the traditional manner.

== Use in dishes ==
One of the noodle's most popular combinations in a dish is jook-sing wonton noodles (竹昇雲吞麵).
