= Fried noodles =

Noodle dishes common throughout Asia

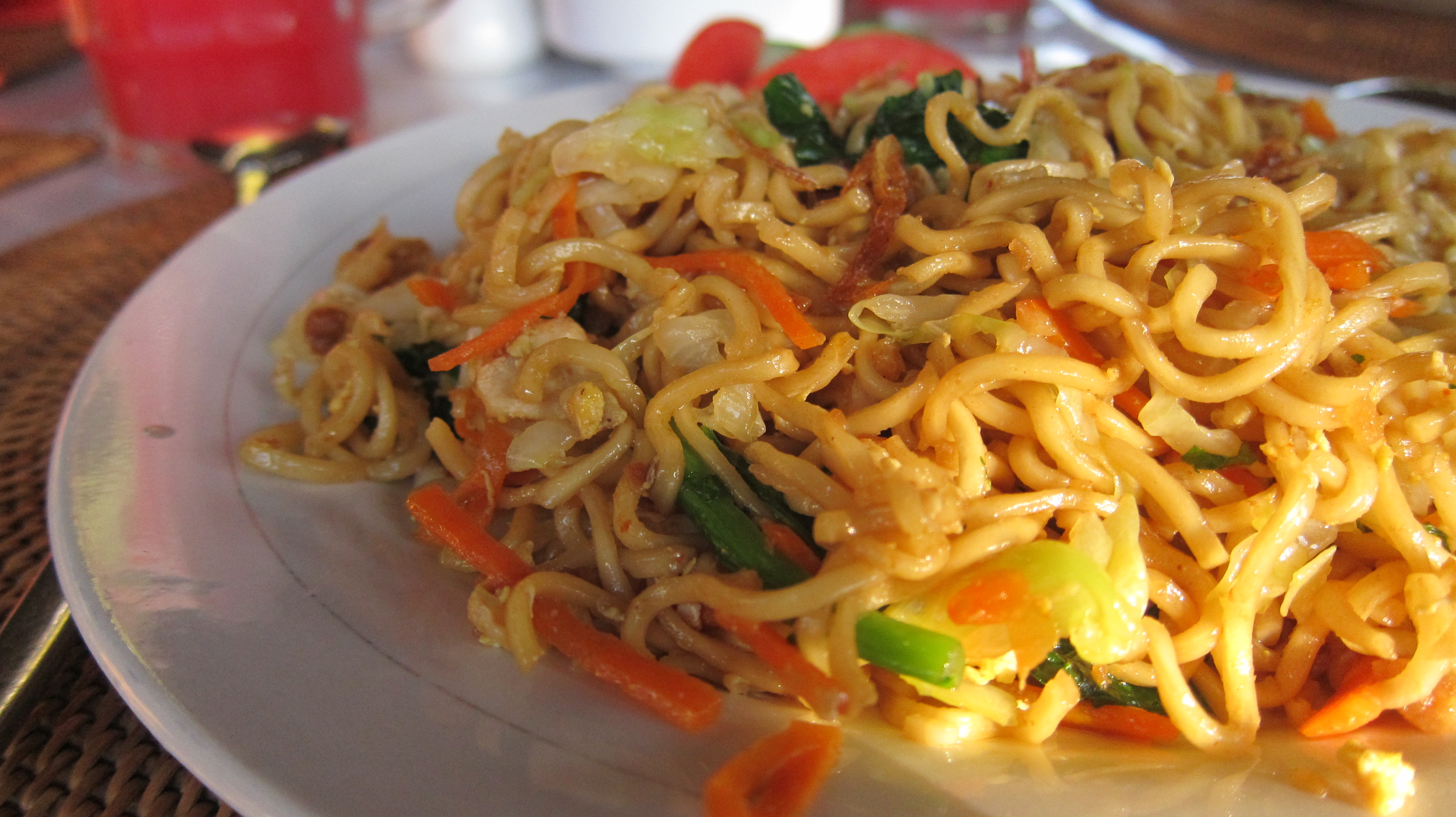
Mie goreng, Indonesian fried noodles served in Bali

Fried noodles are common throughout East Asia, Southeast Asia and South Asia. Many varieties, cooking styles, and ingredients exist.

== Fried noodle dishes ==
=== Stir-fried ===
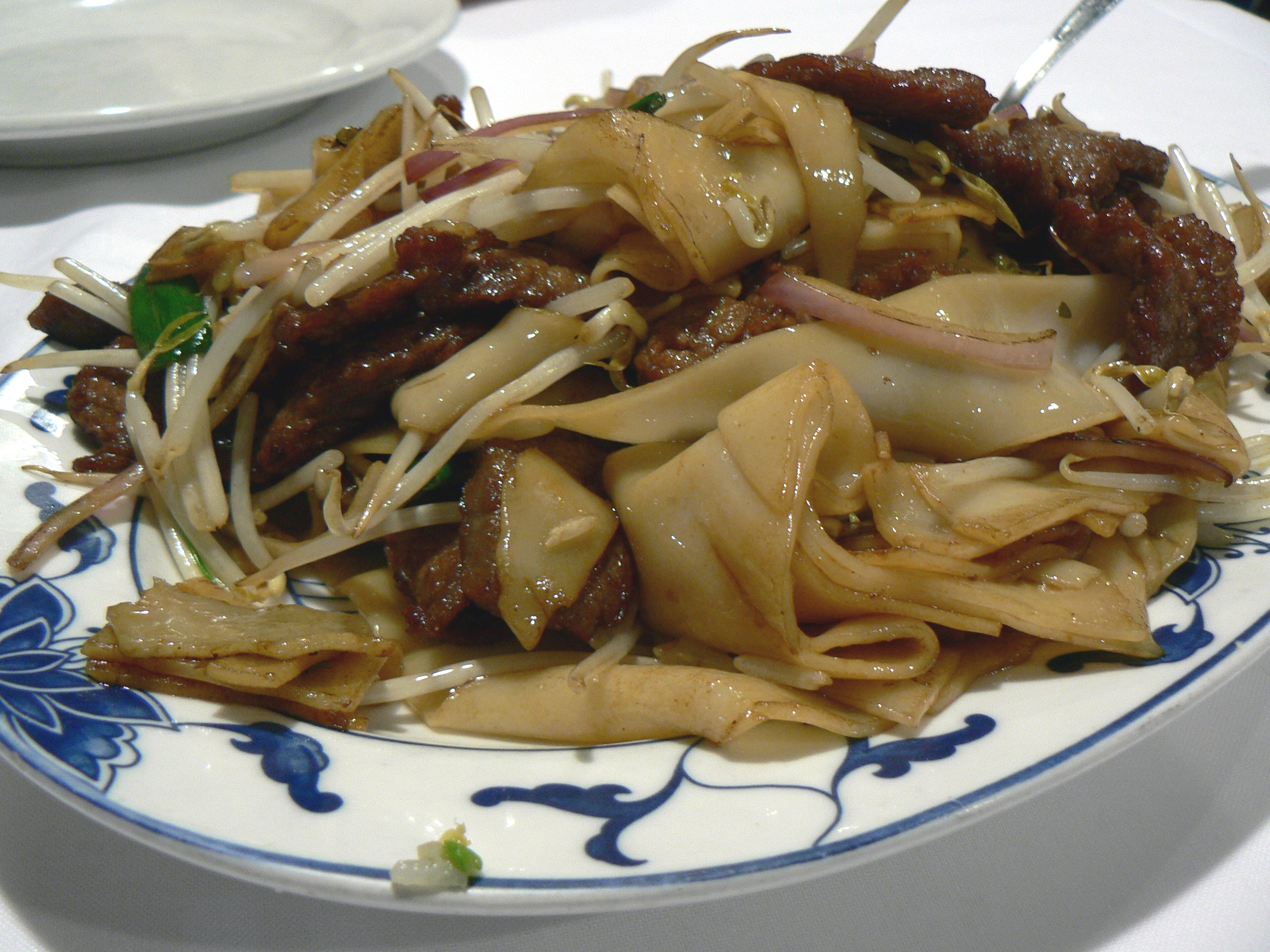
Beef chow fun

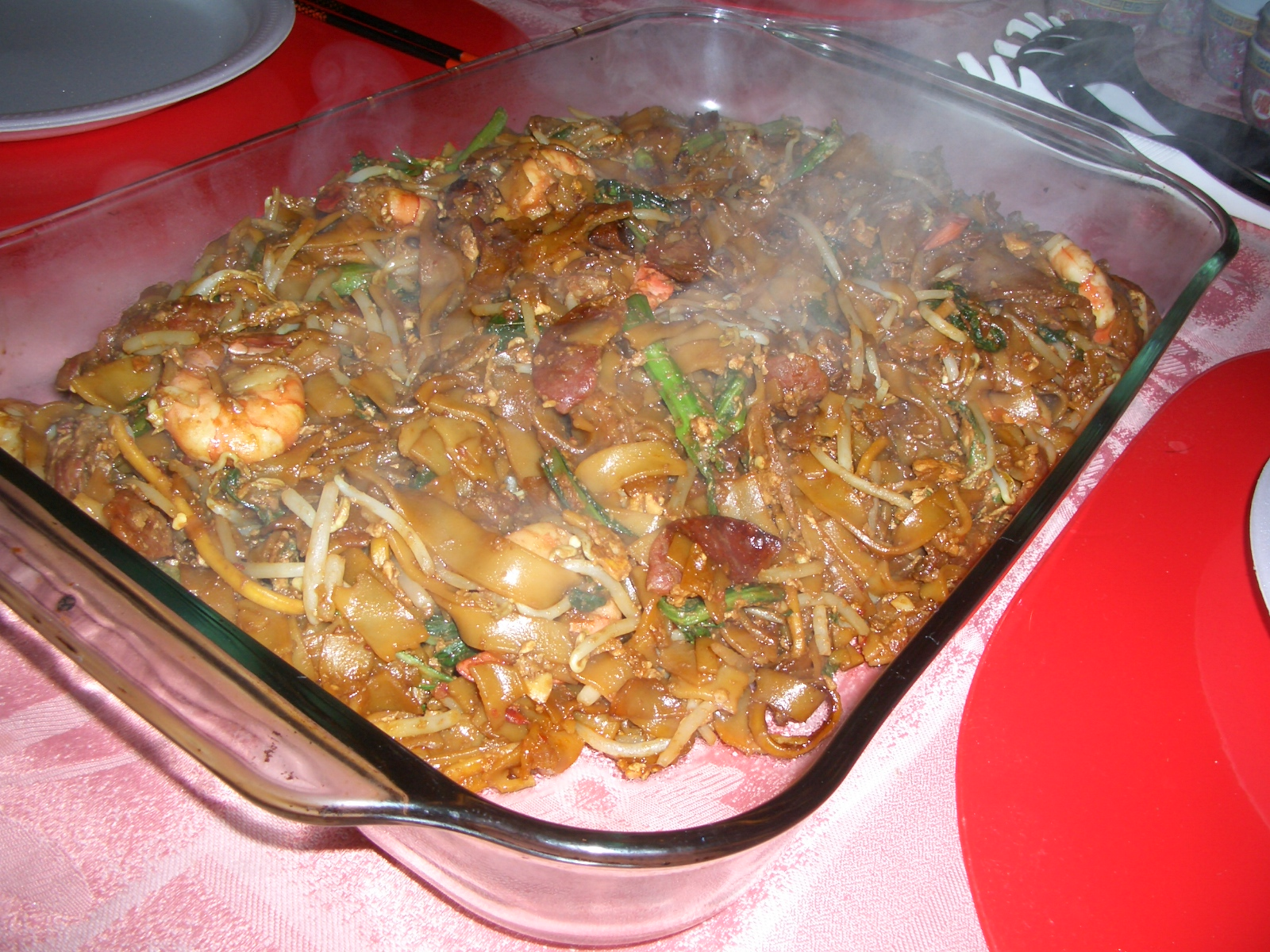
Char kway teow

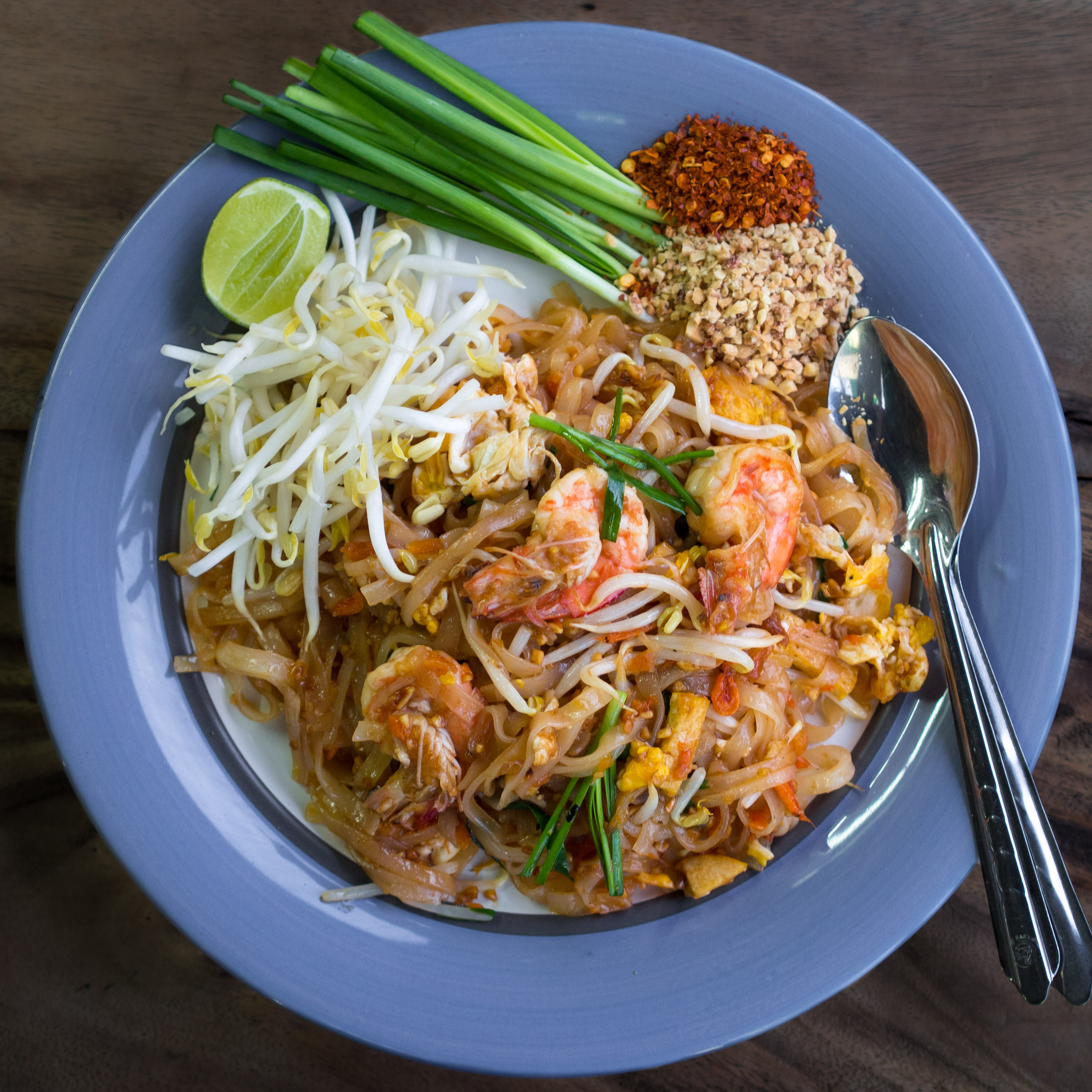
Pad thai

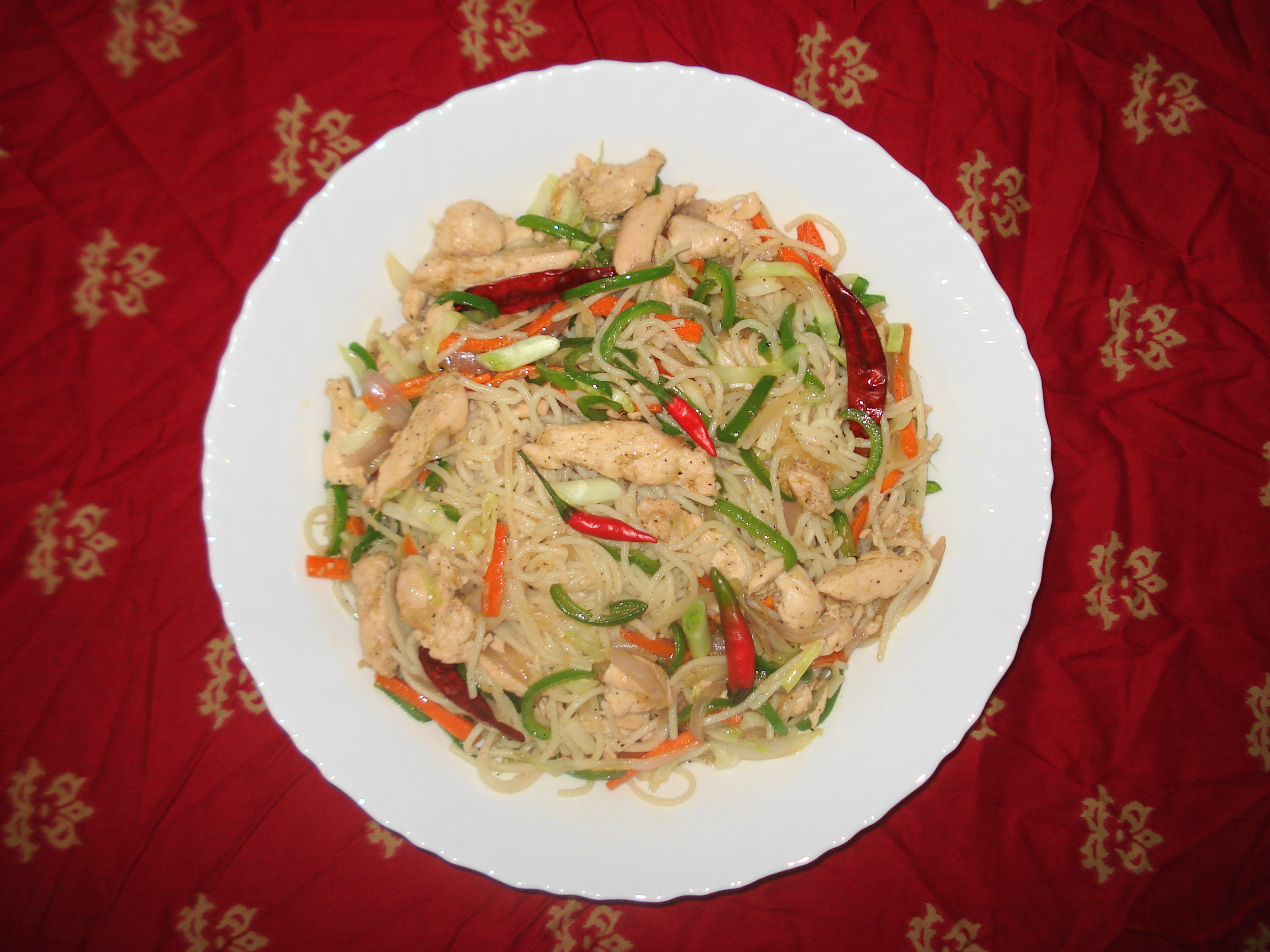
Chicken chow mein from Nepal

- Beef chow fun – Cantonese dish of stir-fried beef, flat rice noodles, bean sprouts, and green onions
- Char kway teow – Chinese-inspired dish commonly served in Malaysia and Singapore, comprising stir-fried, flat rice noodles with prawns, eggs, bean sprouts, fish cake, mussels, green leafy vegetables and Chinese sausages
- Chow chow – Nepali-style stir-fried noodles, often cooked with onion, vegetables and buff (water buffalo meat) and also widely eaten in India
- Chow mein – dish featured in Nepalese cuisine, American Chinese cuisine and Canadian Chinese cuisine; also a generic term for stir-fried wheat noodles in Chinese
- Hakka noodles – Indian-Chinese style fried noodles, commonly known as desi chow mein
- Drunken noodles (phat khi mao) – Thai dish of stir-fried wide rice noodles
- Hokkien mee – Chinese-inspired Malaysian and Singaporean dish, of stir-fried noodles with many variations in ingredients
- Japchae – Korean dish made with cellophane noodles
- Kwetiau goreng – Chinese Indonesian stir-fried flat rice noodles (kwetiau or shahe fen) with garlic, shallots, beef, chicken or prawn, chili, vegetables and sweet soy sauce
- Lo mein – American Chinese-style stir-fried wheat noodles
- Mee goreng - fried noodles common in the Malay-speaking communities of Malaysia, Singapore and Sri Lanka
- Mee siam – Malaysian and Singaporean dish of rice vermicelli in spicy, sweet and sour light gravy. Dry variations are also common.
- Mie goreng – spicy stir-fried yellow wheat noodles common in Indonesia
- Mie goreng Aceh – hot and spicy stir-fried thick yellow wheat noodles from Aceh province, Indonesia
- Pad thai – Thai-style stir-fried rice noodles with egg, fish sauce, and a combination of bean sprouts, shrimp, chicken, or tofu
- Pancit bihon – Filipino stir-fried rice vermicelli
  - Pancit estacion
  - Pancit Malabon
- Phat si-io – Thai dish of stir-fried wide rice noodles
- Rat na – Thai dish of stir-fried wide rice noodles
- Shanghai fried noodles
- Singapore chow fun/Singapore-style rice vermicelli – not actually from Singapore; Cantonese dish of thin rice noodles stir-fried with curry powder, bean sprouts, barbecued pork, and vegetables
- Singapore chow mein – same as above, but with wheat noodles
- Yaki udon – Japanese stir-fried thick wheat udon noodles
- Yakisoba – Japanese-style fried wheat or buckwheat noodles, flavoured with sosu (Japanese Worcestershire sauce) and served with pork, cabbage, and beni shōga; often served at festival stalls or as a filling for sandwiches

=== Pan-fried ===
- Hong Kong fried noodles – Hong Kong-style dish consisting of flour noodles pan-fried until crispy, and served together with vegetables, chicken or seafood

=== Deep-fried ===
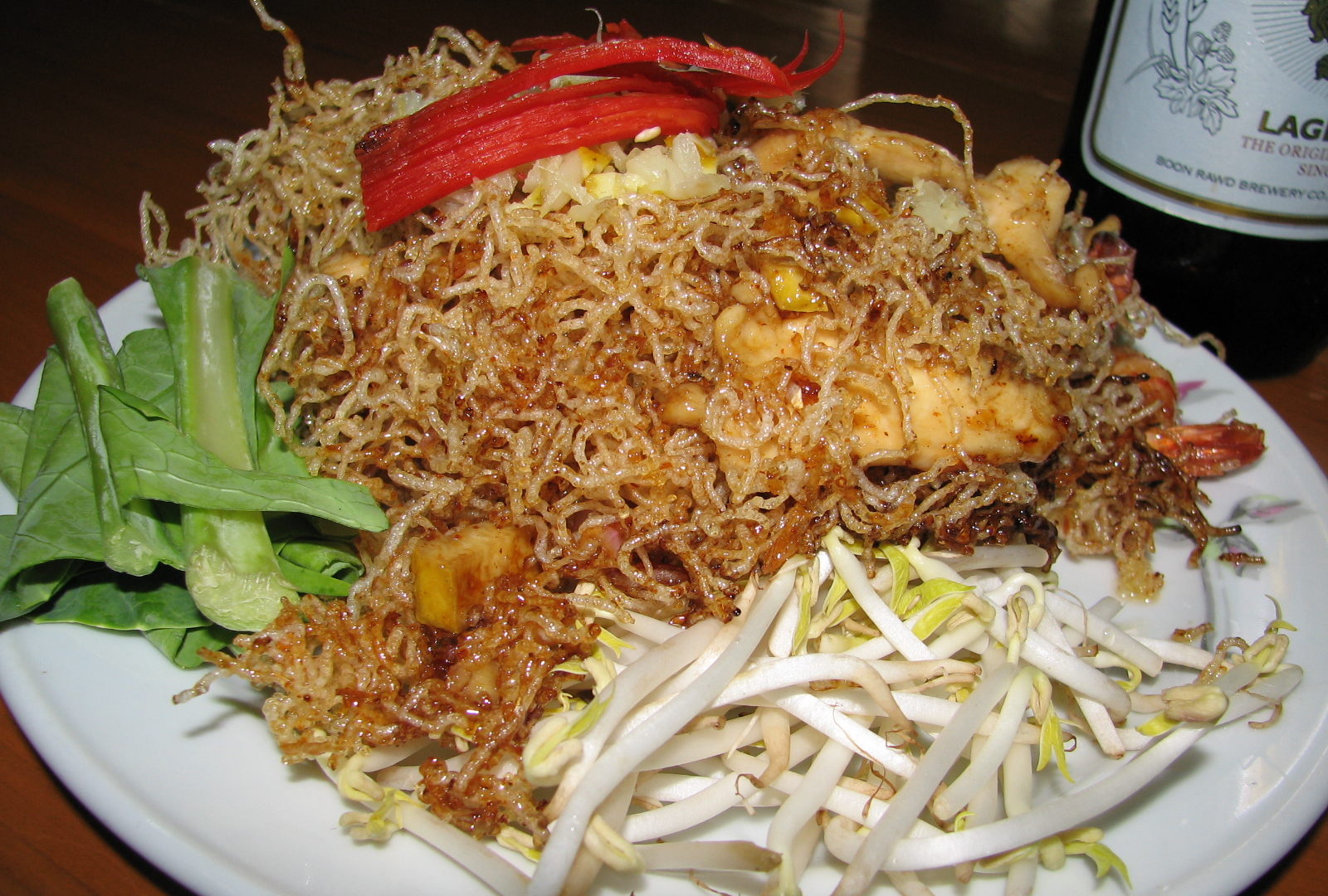
Mi krop

- Fried crunchy wonton noodles – deep-fried strips of wonton wrappers, served as an appetizer with duck sauce and hot mustard at American Chinese restaurants
- I fu mie, Chinese Indonesian dried fried yi mein noodle served in sauce with vegetables, chicken or prawns.
- Mie kering, Chinese-influenced deep-fried crispy noodle from Makassar, Indonesia. Also known as kurum kurum in part of Pakistan.
- Mi krop – Thai dish consisting of crispy deep-fried rice noodles.
- Sangza – Deep-fried wheat noodles from northern China

== See also ==
- Buldak Bokkeum Myun
- List of noodle dishes
- Chow mein
