= Drunken noodles =

Thai dish

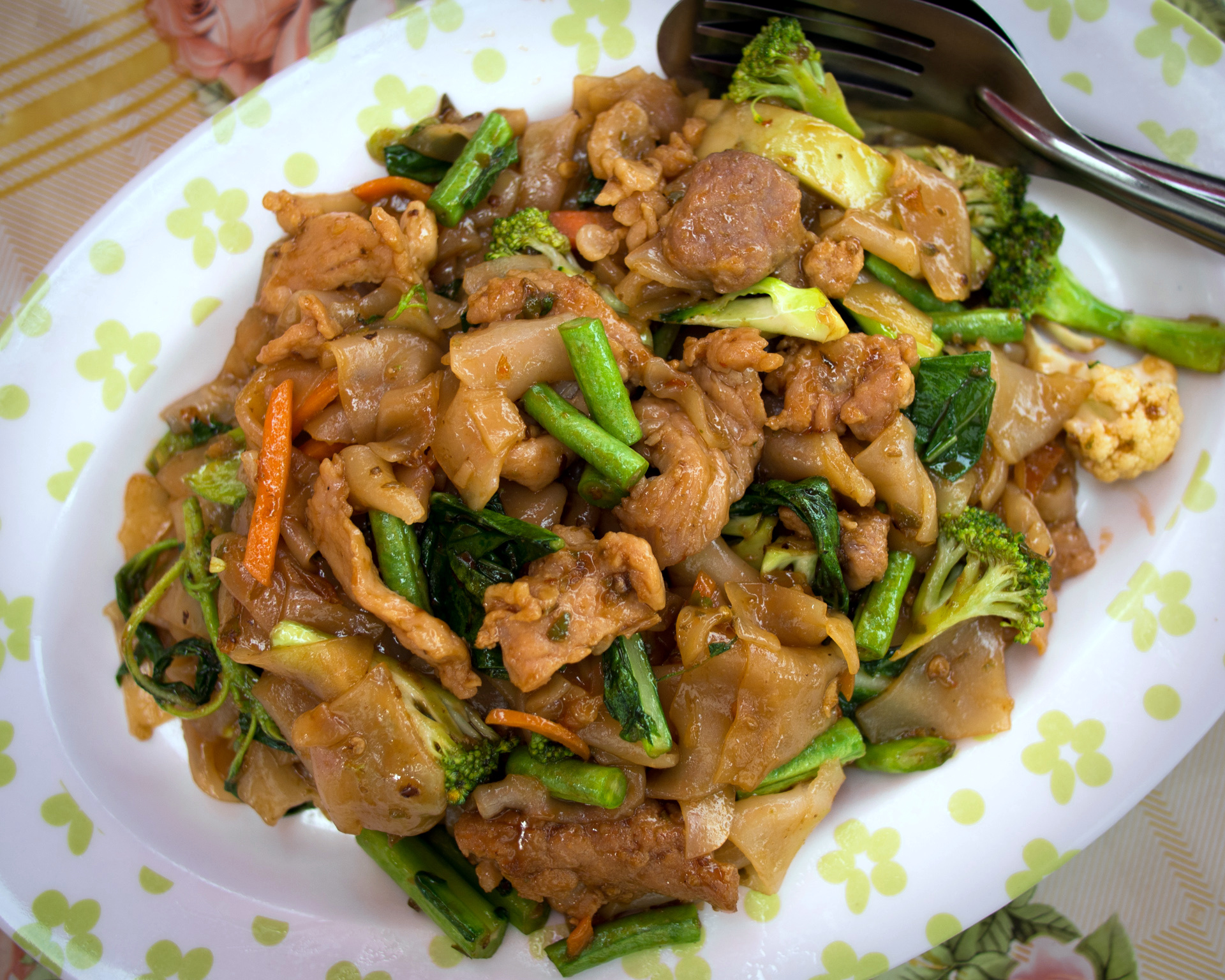
- A plate of drunken noodles in Chiang Mai, Thailand
- Type: Noodle
- Place of origin: Thailand
- Region or state: Thailand
- Main ingredients: Broad rice noodles, soy sauce, fish sauce, garlic, meat, seafood or tofu, bean sprouts or other vegetables, chili, holy basil

Drunken noodles or drunkard noodles is a Thai stir-fried noodle dish similar to phat si-io but spicier. In English texts, it is rendered as pad kee mao, pad ki mao, or pad kimao /ˌpæd kiː ˈmaʊ/ – from its Thai name Thai: ผัดขี้เมา, RTGS: phat khi mao, [pʰàt kʰîː māw], in which phat means 'to stir-fry' and khi mao means 'drunkard'. Its name refers to it being popular among the inebriated; unlike drunken chicken, alcohol is not part of the ingredients or preparation.

The dish is widely available in restaurants or at street vendors in Thailand but it is also popular in the United States, and has become ubiquitous on Thai restaurant menus there.

== History ==
The origin of the name behind the dish is unclear, but there are several explanations. One anecdotal explanation for the name "drunkard (or drunken) noodles" is that the meal is often consumed after a night of drinking, prepared from assorted leftovers commonly on hand and staple ingredients. Others say that the name comes through the idea that the spicy seasoning of the dish is "meant to tear through the dulled palates of the inebriated."

There are also local stories regarding the origins of the dish. One story is that a wife was upset by her husband's post-drinking behavior and decided to teach him a lesson. She added as many spices as she could find to his favorite noodles. She believed that the heavy mixture of spices including chilies would fix her husband's behavior.

== Ingredients ==
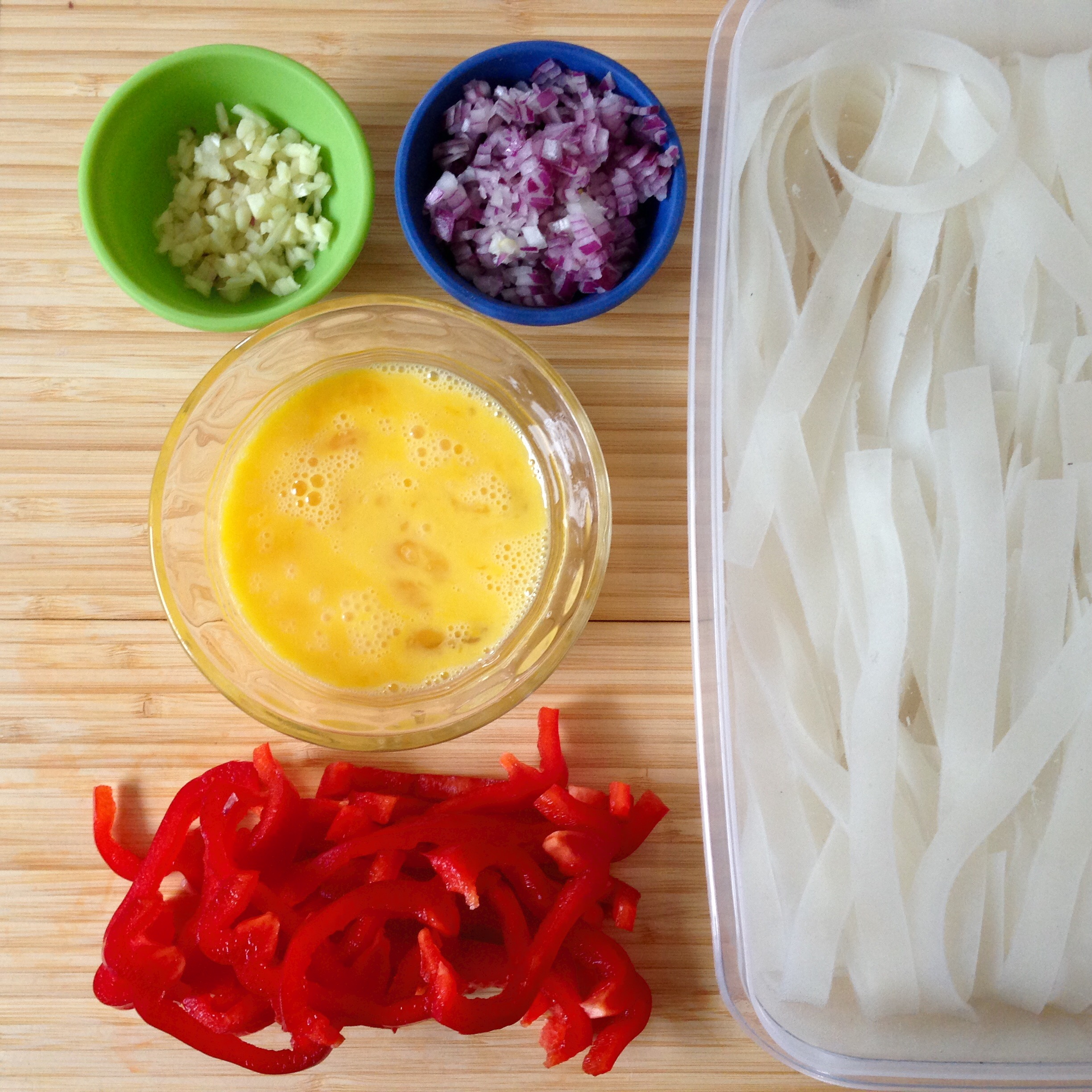
Ingredients for drunken noodles

The dish originates from a spicy stir-fry dish that originally did not include noodles. The base ingredients of the aforementioned spicy stir-fry are garlic, shallots, fresh chilies, and shrimp paste, and holy basil (for topping). Eventually, the stir-fry was converted into a noodle dish made with broad rice noodles (kuaitiao sen yai in Thai), soy sauce, fish sauce, oyster sauce, garlic, meat, seafood, chili, fresh black pepper pods and holy basil, which give rise to its distinctive spiciness. Certain versions of this dish may include eggs. The recipe for the noodles is not rigid and may often differ.

Substitutions for some base ingredients can be made and the dish can be easily made vegetarian or vegan. Fish sauce can be substituted for Thai thin soy sauce. The meat or seafood can be replaced with tofu or vegetables such as cabbage, carrots, broccoli, snow peas, or bell peppers. Broad rice noodles may be substituted for fresh chewy rice noodles or even regular pad Thai noodles. Some can be served without noodles and instead serve the vegetables and protein stir-fry with rice. Other variations include the dish using instant noodles, or a fusion version using spaghetti instead of rice noodles.

Pad see ew is generally regarded to be a sister recipe to this dish. Drunken fried rice or khao phat khi mao are similarly prepared dishes using the same base ingredients.

== Gallery ==
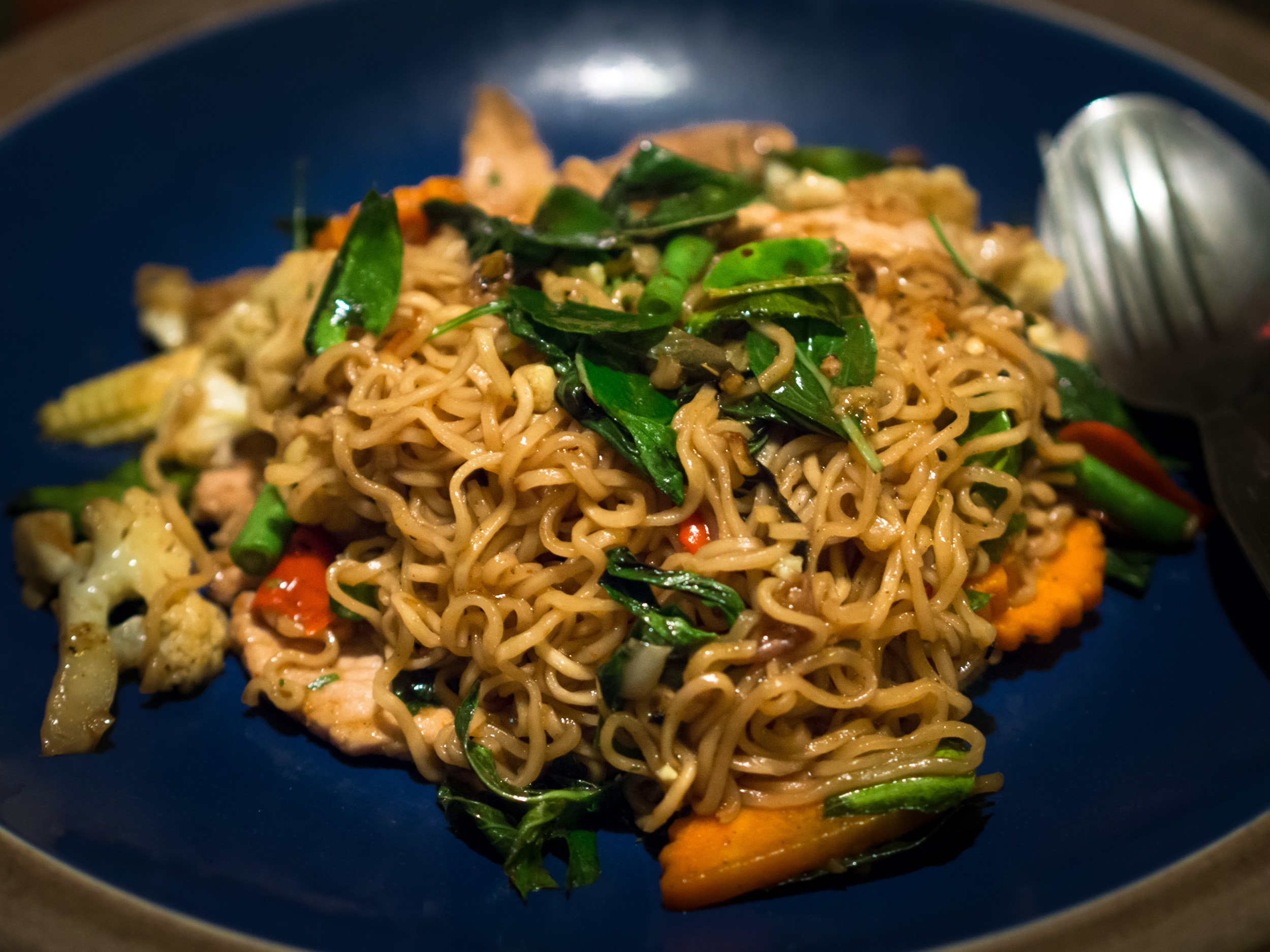
A variation with instant noodles

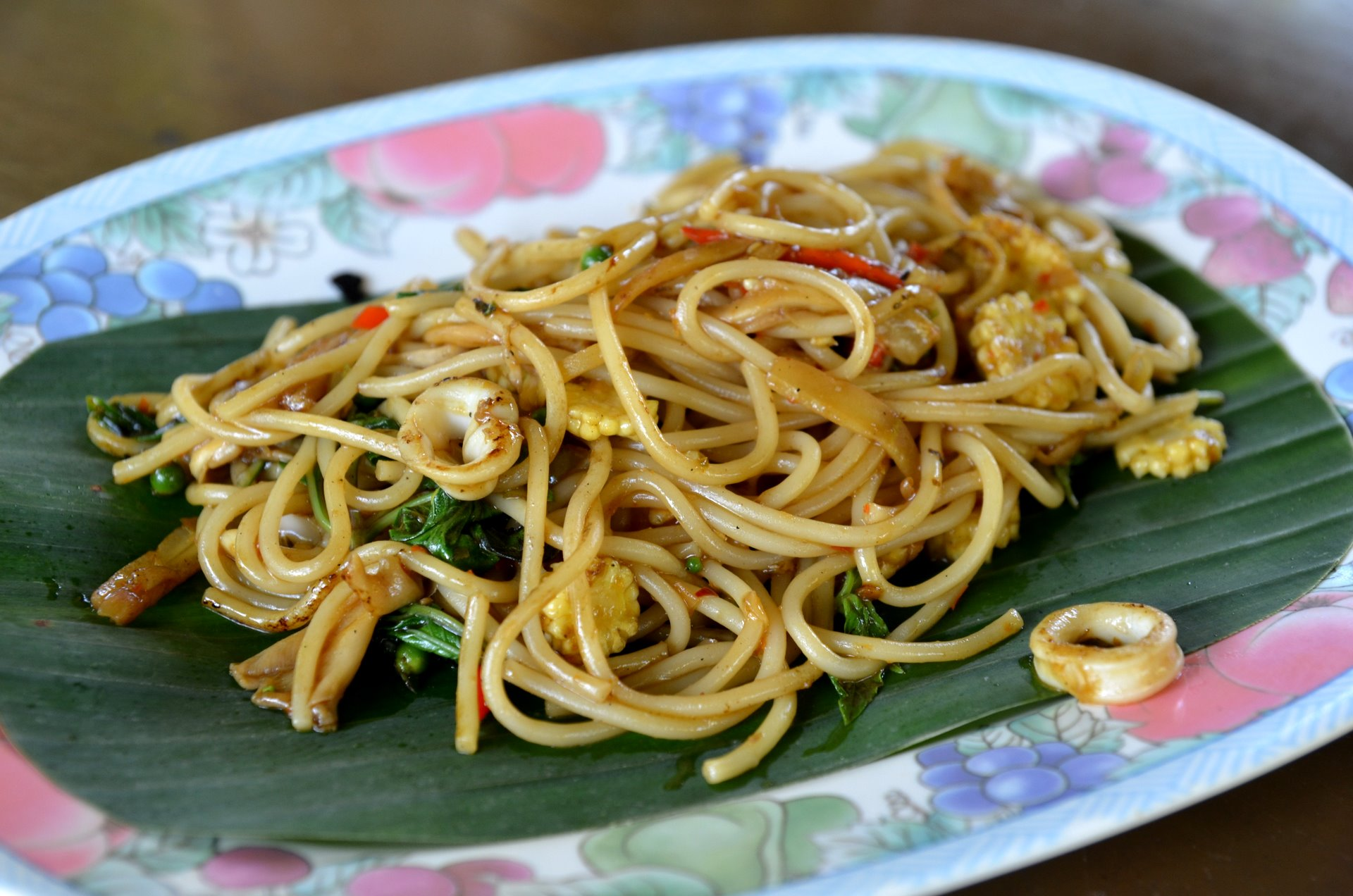
A modern Thai fusion version with spaghetti

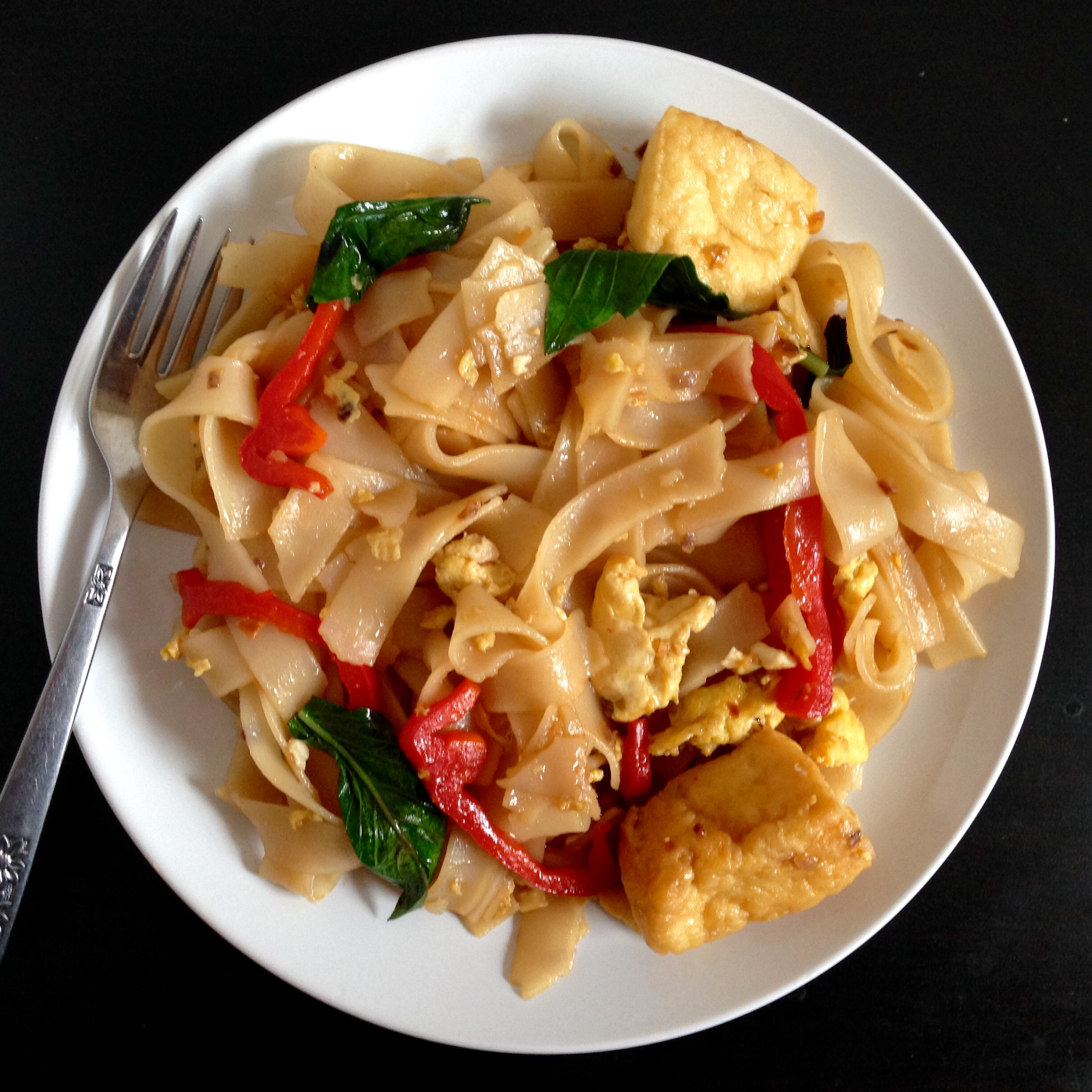
Homemade drunken noodles

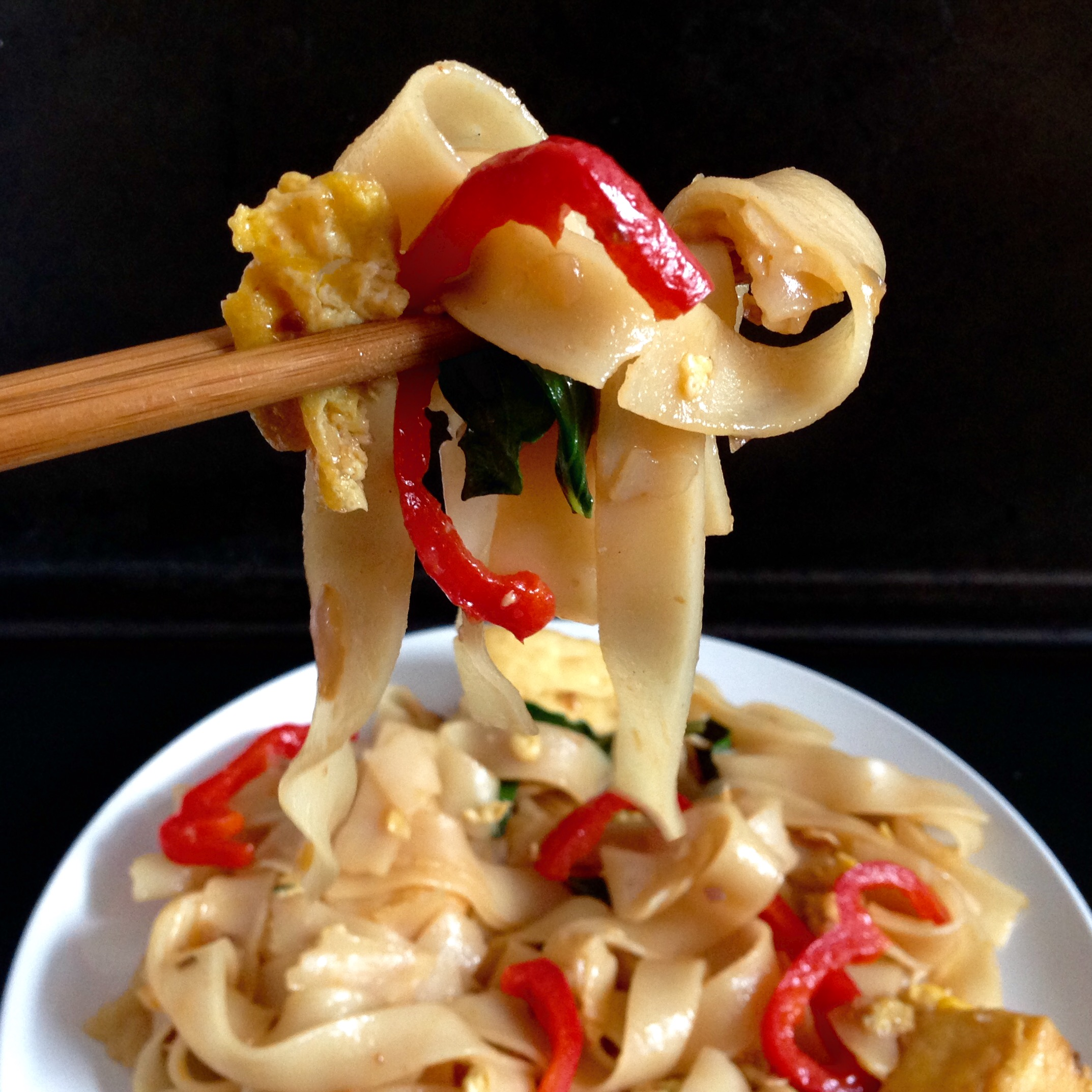
Closeup of drunken noodles

== See also ==
- Drunken chicken
- Drunken spaghetti
- Fried noodles
