= Thick noodle =

A thick noodle is one of any variety of noodles that are deemed to have a relatively large cross-section according to regional cuisine.

- Cumian, from China
- Garak-guksu, from Korea
- Pici, from Tuscany
- Udon, from Japan
