= Street food of Thailand =

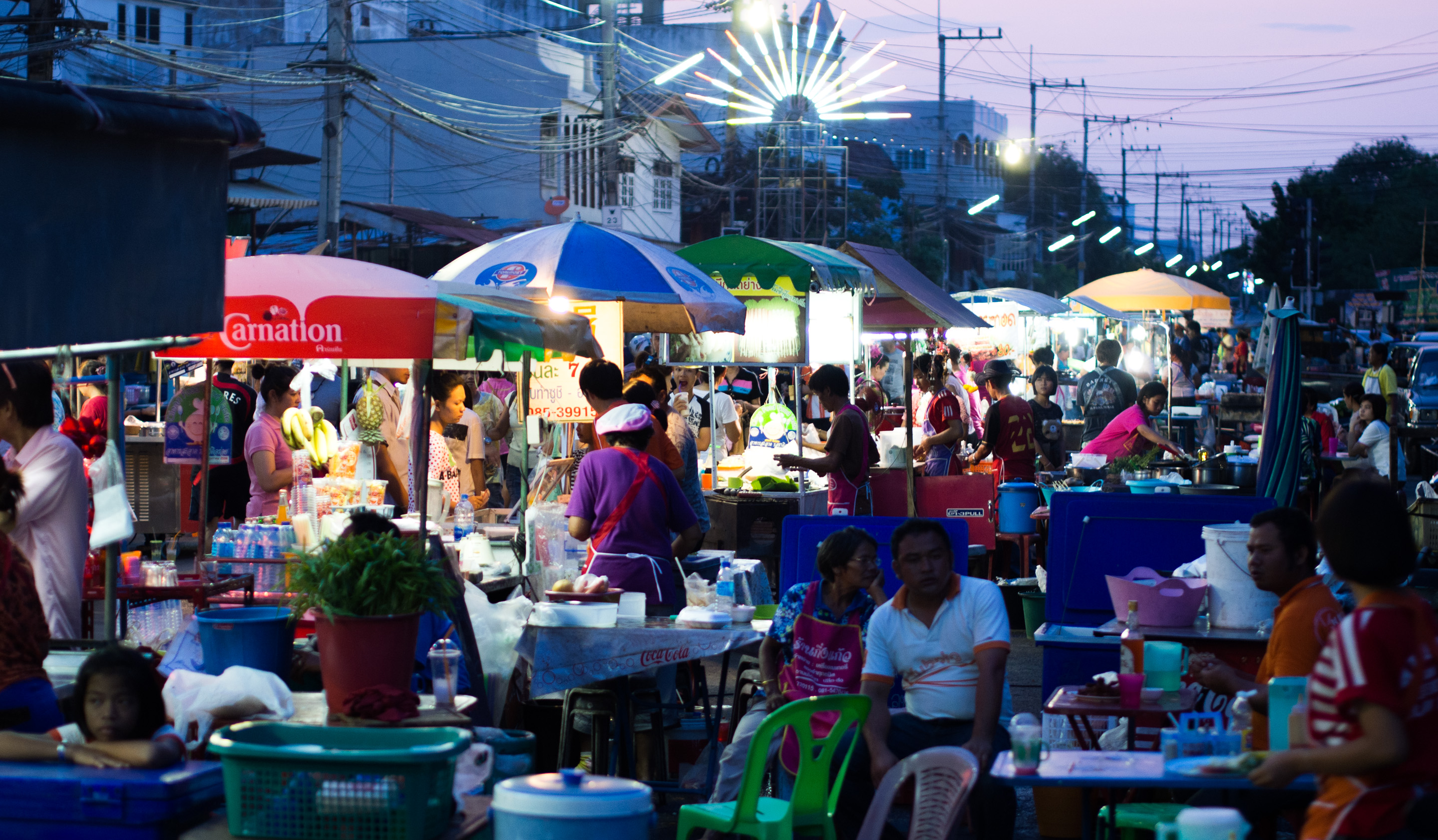
Street food scene, Yasothon Rocket Festival.

Street food in Thailand brings together various offerings of ready-to-eat meals, snacks, fruits and drinks sold by hawkers or vendors at food stalls or food carts on the street side in Thailand. Sampling Thai street food is a popular activity for visitors, as it offers a taste of Thai cooking traditions. Bangkok is often mentioned as one of the best places for street food. In 2012, VirtualTourist named Bangkok as the number one spot for street food—the city is notable for both its variety of offerings and the abundance of street hawkers.

There are many areas in Bangkok that are famous for as a street food center such as Yaowarat and nearby area (Talat Noi, Wat Traimit and Chaloem Buri), Nang Loeng, Sam Phraeng, Pratu Phi, Bang Lamphu, Kasat Suek, Sam Yan, Tha Din Daeng, Wongwian Yai, Wang Lang, Talat Phlu.

== Characteristics ==
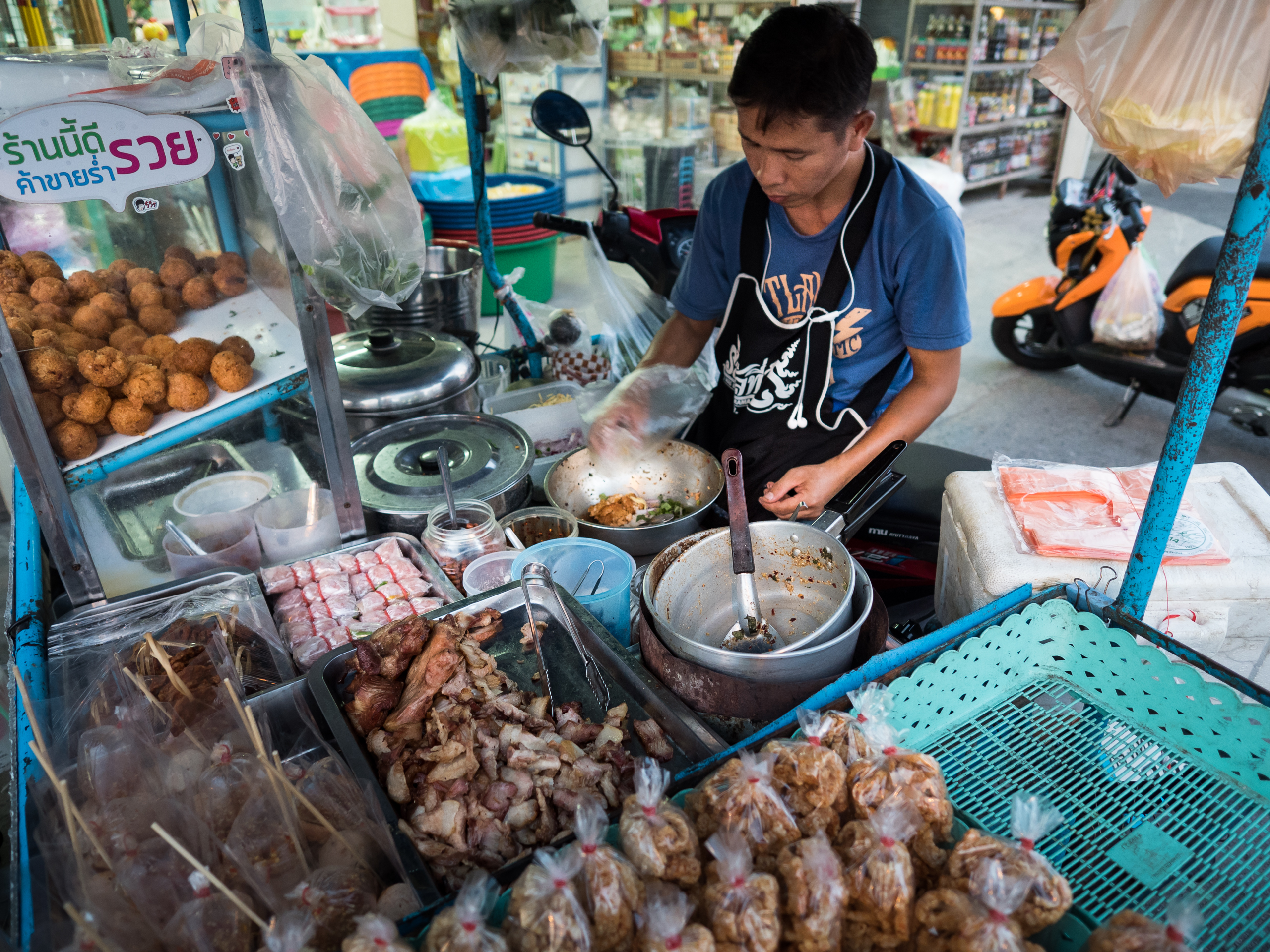
The mobile food stall of a vendor selling yam naem khao thot in Ayutthaya

There is scarcely a Thai dish that is not sold by a street vendor or at a market somewhere in Thailand. Some specialize in only one or two dishes, others offer a complete menu that rivals that of restaurants. Some sell only pre-cooked foods, others make food to order. The foods that are made to order, tend to be dishes that can be quickly prepared: quick stir fries with rice, such as kaphrao mu (spicy basil-fried minced pork) or phat khana (stir fried gailan), and quick curries such as pladuk phat phet (catfish fried with red curry paste). Pad Thai, a staple of Thai cuisine is a very popular dish sold across the country's street food stalls.

The dishes sold at wet markets in Thailand tend to be offered pre-cooked. Many people go there, and also to street vendors, to buy food to eat at work, or to take back home. It is a common sight to see Thais carrying whole communal meals consisting of several dishes, cooked rice, sweets, and fruit, all neatly packaged in plastic bags and foam food containers, to be shared with colleagues at work or at home. Due to the fact that many dishes are similar to those that people would cook at home, it is a good place to find regional, and seasonal, foods.

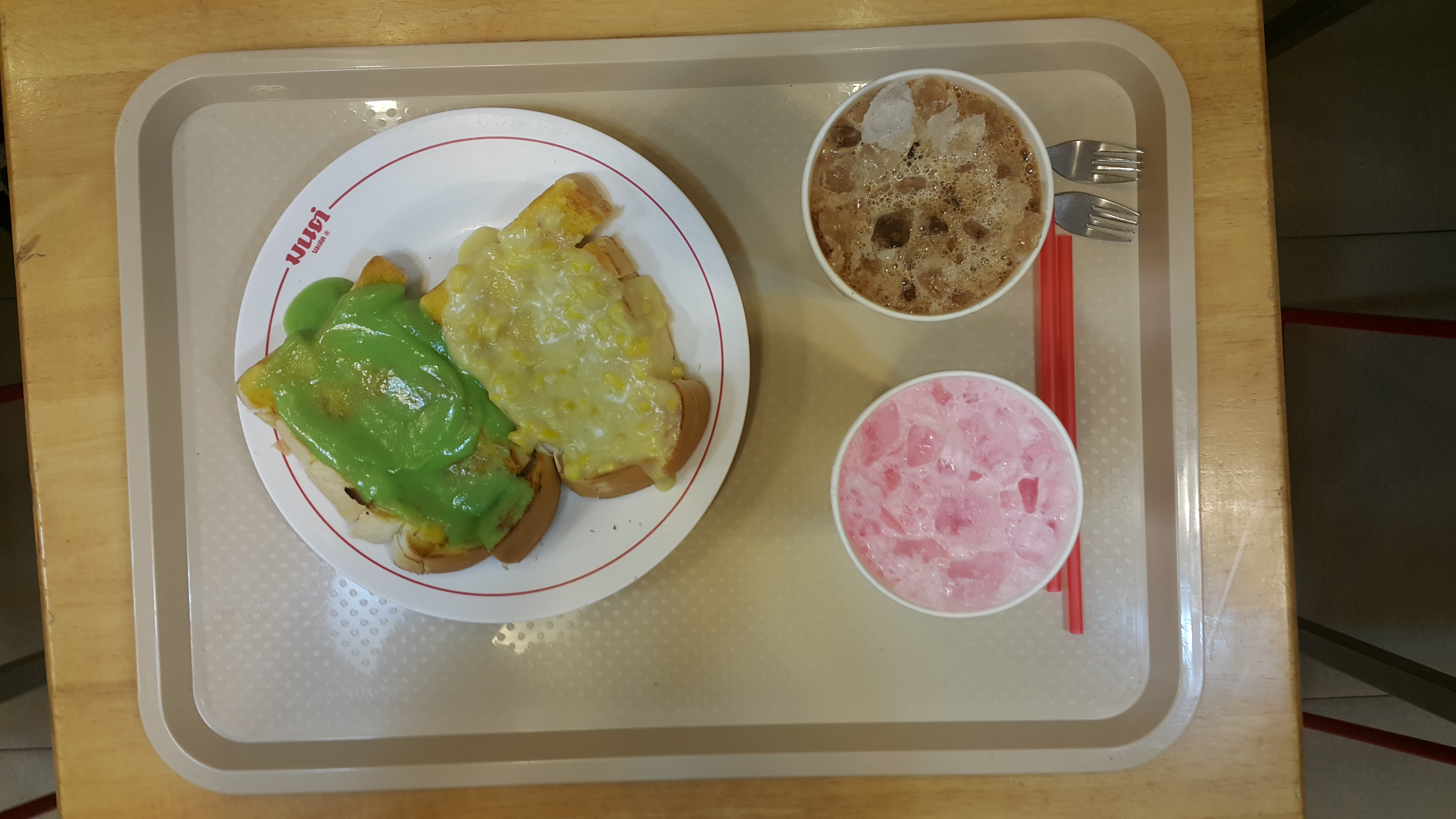
Grilled bread with jam served with sweetened milk in Bangkok

Food markets in Thailand, large open air halls with permanent stalls, tend to operate as a collection of street stalls, each vendor with their own array of tables and providing (limited) service, although some resemble the regular food courts at shopping malls and large supermarkets, with service counters and the communal use of tables. Food courts and food markets offer many of the same foods as street stalls, both pre-cooked as well as made to order. Night food markets, in the form of a collection of street stalls and mobile vendors, spring up in parking lots, along busy streets, and at temple fairs and local festivals in the evenings, when the temperatures are more agreeable and people have finished work.

== History ==
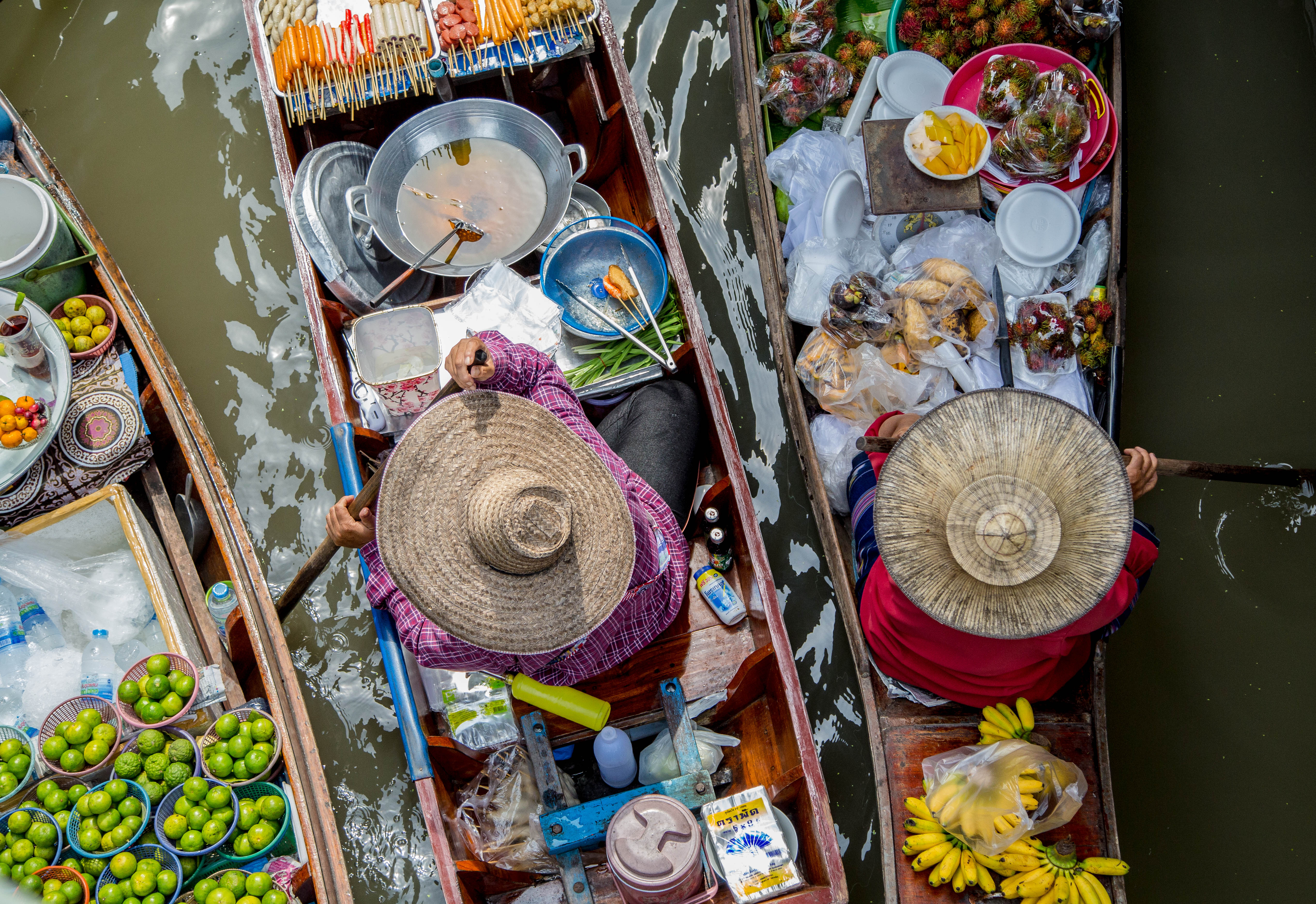
Floating market in Thailand offers a selection of fruits and food.

Although street food culture is well established in Thailand today, it is a relatively new phenomenon that grew out of the ethnic Chinese enclaves of Bangkok and only became commonplace in the 1970s. The street food culture of much of Southeast Asia was introduced by coolie workers imported from China during the late 19th century. Bangkok Chinatown is considered to be the birthplace of Thai street food as this was where most Chinese immigrants settled.

As a result, many Thai street foods are derived from or heavily influenced by Chinese cuisine. Street food was commonly sold by the ethnic Chinese population of Thailand and did not become popular among native Thai people until the early 1960s, when the rapid urban population growth stimulated the street food culture, and by the 1970s it had "displaced home-cooking."

Traditionally, Thai foods are prepared daily by housewives in every Thai household. Yet, selling food is a common economic activity in old Siam, as various ingredients, fruits and traditional delicacies was offered at "floating markets" in canals as early as the Ayutthaya Period (1350–1767). Floating market food or canal food has been sold from boats on Thailand's rivers and canals for over two centuries. However, since the early 20th century King Rama V's modernizations caused a shift towards land-based stalls. In Bangkok parlance, a housewife who feeds her family from a street food vendor is known as a "plastic-bag housewife", which originated from street vendors packaging the food in plastic bags.

The proliferation of Thailand's street food culture is attributed to both internal and external factors: the influence of Chinese immigrants, the Thai way of life that revolved around agriculture and food production, the rich culinary tradition, the concept of readily accessible and affordable food being engrained in Thai culture, rapid urbanization that created local demand and subsequent opportunities in food service in urban areas, and rising demand for local foods by both Thais and foreign visitors.

== Types ==
=== Dishes ===
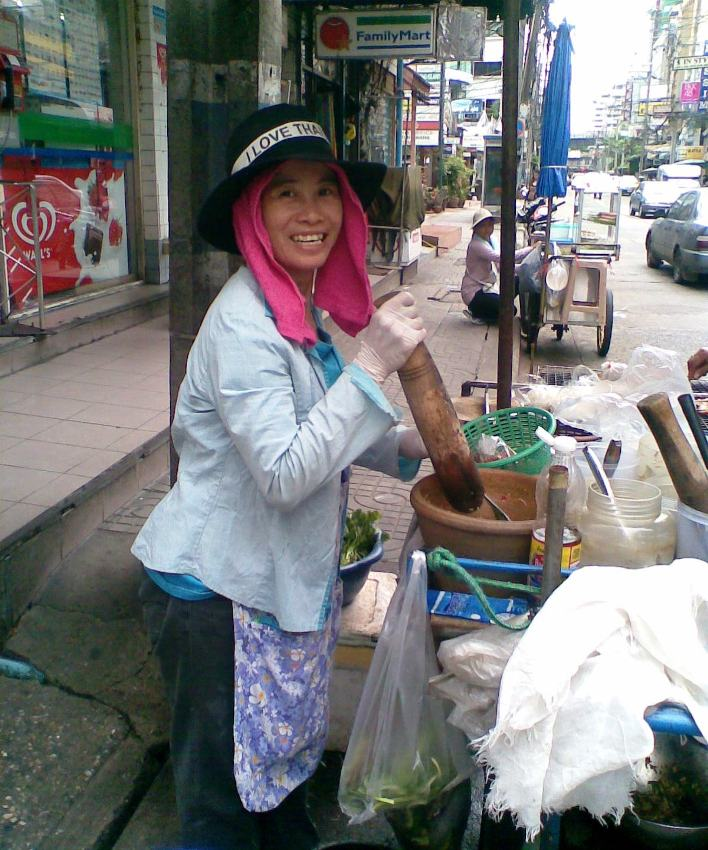
Som tam (green papaya salad) is a popular street food in Thailand.

Noodles are a popular street food item as they are mainly eaten as a single dish. Noodle dishes include pad Thai; rad na, flat noodles with beef, pork, or chicken and vegetables, topped with a light gravy; and rad naa's twin, phat si-io, the same flat noodles dry-fried (no gravy) with a dark soy sauce, vegetables, meat, and chili. Chinese-style noodle soups, fried noodles, and fermented Thai rice noodles (khanom chin), served with a choice of different Thai curries, are popular.

Nearly everywhere in Thailand som tam (green papaya salad) and sticky rice are sold at stalls and roadside shops. This is popularly eaten together with grilled chicken, and kai tod (Thai: ไก่ทอด), both of which are widely available from street vendors; if a stall does not offer one, another nearby usually will. Other dishes include tom yum kung (a sour shrimp soup), khao phat (fried rice), various kinds of satay, and various curries. Japanese chikuwa and German sausages have also appeared in Bangkok.

In most cities and towns there will be stalls selling sweet roti, a thin, flat fried dough envelope, with fillings such as banana, egg, and chocolate. The roti is similar to the Malay roti canai and Singaporean roti prata, and the stalls are often operated by Thai Muslims.

=== Snacks ===
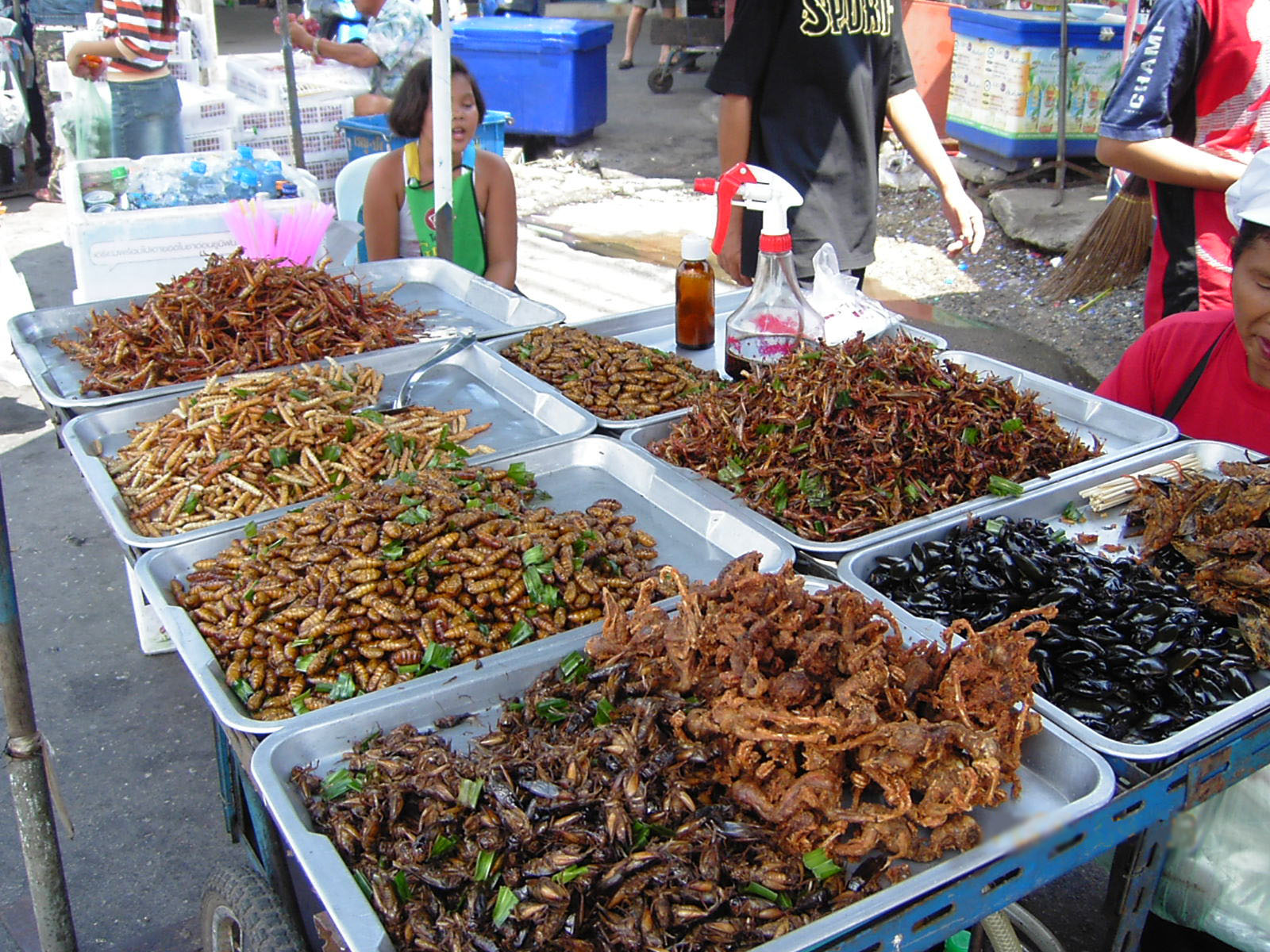
Various fried insects sold as street food in Thailand.

Sweets snacks, collectively called khanom, such as tako (coconut cream jelly), khanom man (coconut cassava cake), and khanom wun (flavored jellies), "khao lam" from Chonburi can be seen displayed on large trays in glass covered push-carts. Other sweets, such as khanom bueang and khanom krok (somewhat similar to Dutch poffertjes), are made to order.

In the evenings, mobile street stalls, often only a scooter with a side car, drive by and temporarily set up shop outside bars in Thailand, selling kap klaem ("drinking food"). Popular kap klaem dishes sold by mobile vendors are grilled items such as sun-dried squid, meats on skewers, or grilled sour sausages, and deep-fried snacks such as fried sausages. Peeled and sliced fruits are also sold from street carts, laid out on a bed of crushed ice to preserve their freshness. Salapao, steamed buns filled with meat or sweet beans and the Thai version of the Chinese steamed baozi, are also commonly sold by mobile vendors. Also common are fried insects.

== Governmental regulation ==
In 2017 the Bangkok Metropolitan Administration (BMA) and the Metropolitan Police Bureau (MPB) began ordering street food vendors off the pavements and roadways of the capital. The impetus for the crackdown was cleanliness, pedestrian safety, and the rights of shop owners and tenants whose shopfronts or driveways were blocked by the street stalls and vendors. Researchers at the Thailand Development Research Institute (TDRI) claim that the policy "...has had an adverse effect on the character of [Bangkok]." They found that most customers of street vendors are low-income white-collar workers, students, and blue-collar workers. Up to 60 percent of these customers earn less than 9,000 baht per month. More than 70 percent of street vendors are over 40 years old. Most are unschooled and have few job options. The researchers charge that the two state agencies have ignored how much street vendors contribute to the country's economy and municipal vibrancy. They urge the BMA and the MPB to revise their policy and implement efficient regulations which strike a balance between walkable pavements and allowing Bangkok's street food vendors to prosper.

== See also ==
- Hong Kong street food
- Street food of Indonesia
- List of Thai dishes
- List of street foods
- Regional street food
