= Leela Punyaratabandhu =

Thai American food writer

- ลีลา บุณยรัตพันธุ์
- Born: Bangkok, Thailand

Leela Punyaratabandhu (Thai: ลีลา บุณยรัตพันธุ์; RTGS: Lila Bunyaratphan) is a Thai American cookbook author and food writer on Thai cuisine. Born in Bangkok, Punyaratabandhu is the author of SheSimmers and The Epestle blogs, and a contributor to Epicurious, Wall Street Journal, Serious Eats, and Food52. Punyaratabandhu has commented extensively on Thailand's street food culture in the context of authenticity and the 2017 street clearing campaign launched by the Bangkok Metropolitan Administration. Punyaratabandhu's 2017 cookbook Bangkok: Recipes and Stories from the Heart of Thailand received the 2018 Art of Eating Prize.

== Books ==
- Simple Thai Food: Classic Recipes from the Thai Home Kitchen (2014)
- Bangkok: Recipes and Stories from the Heart of Thailand (2017)
- Flavors of the Southeast Asian Grill: Classic Recipes for Meats and Seafood Cooked over Charcoal (2020)
