= Cart noodle =

Noodle dish traditionally sold by street vendors from carts

Cart Noodles
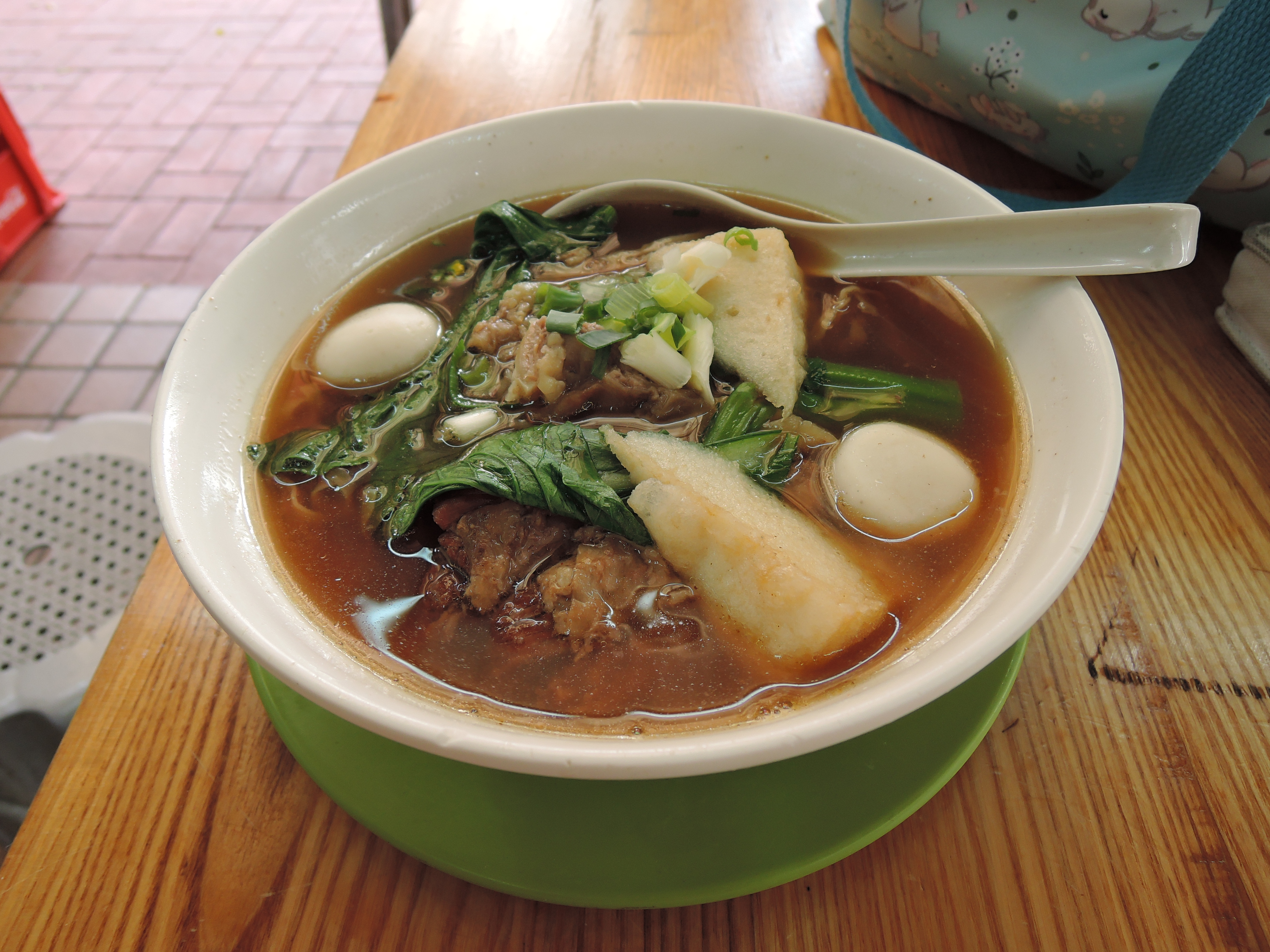
- Cart noodles with beef soup
- Type: Noodles
- Course: Main course
- Place of origin: Hong Kong and Macau
- Serving temperature: Hot
- Main ingredients: Flour, egg, and various toppings

Cart noodle
- Traditional Chinese: 車仔麵
- Simplified Chinese: 车仔面
- Cantonese Yale: Chējái mihn
Transcriptions
Standard Mandarin
- Hanyu Pinyin: Chēzǎi miàn
Yue: Cantonese
- Yale Romanization: Chējái mihn
- Jyutping: Ce1zai2 min6
- IPA: [tsʰɛ́ː tsɐ̌i mìːn]

Alternative Chinese name
- Traditional Chinese: 嗱喳麵
- Simplified Chinese: 嗱喳面
- Cantonese Yale: Láhjá mihn
Transcriptions
Yue: Cantonese
- Yale Romanization: Láhjá mihn
- Jyutping: Laa5zaa2 min6
- IPA: [la̬ː.tsǎː mìːn]

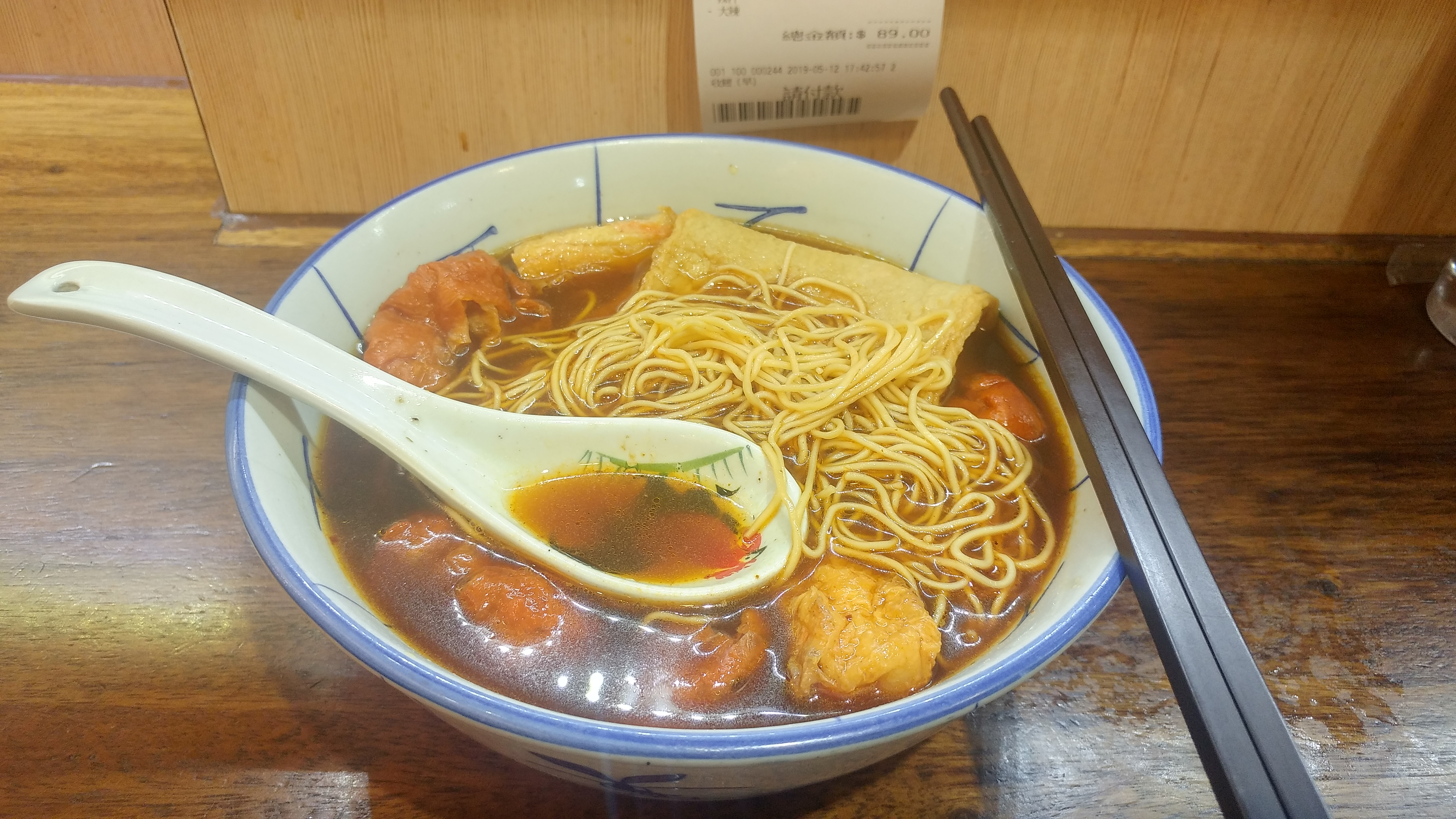
A bowl of thin noodles with sour wheat gluten and fish curd at a restaurant in Sham Shui Po

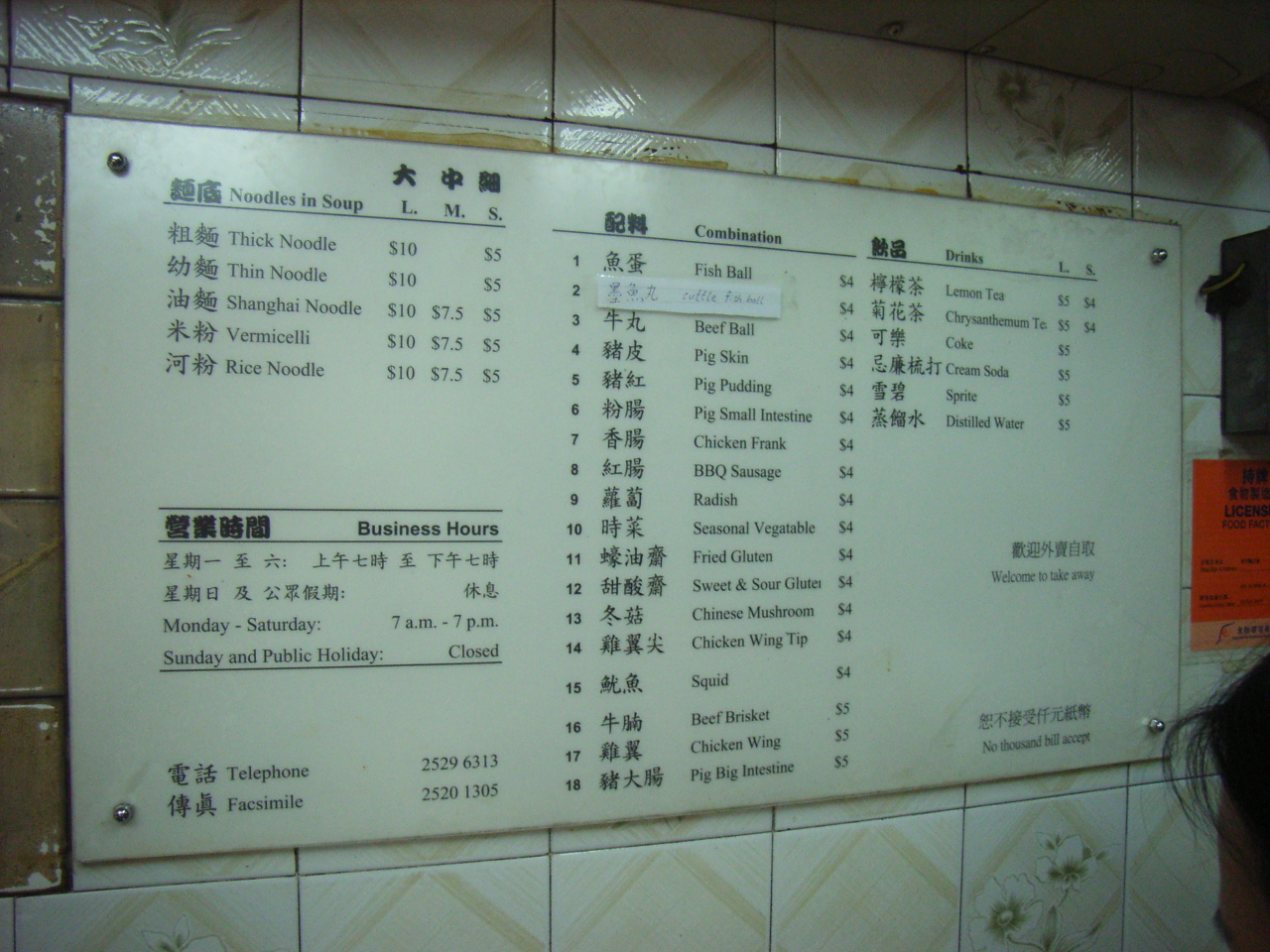
A menu in a cart noodle restaurant in Wan Chai

Cart Noodles (traditional Chinese: 車仔麵; simplified Chinese: 车仔面) is a noodle dish which became popular in Hong Kong and Macau in the 1950s through independent street vendors operating on roadsides and in public housing estates in low-income districts, using mobile carts. Many street vendors have vanished but the name and style of noodle endures as a cultural icon.

== History ==
With many immigrants arriving from mainland China during the 1950s, hawkers would sell food from mobile carts roaming the streets. Some vendors specialising in cooked noodles would sell them with an assortment of toppings and styles.

Historically, the cart frames were assembled out of wood with a metallic basin, allowing a heat source inside to cook the ingredients. In the past, it was possible to receive large quantities for a cheap price. With hygiene standards rising, the majority of street hawkers, licensed or otherwise, have since vanished.

== Legacy ==
The name and style of the noodles endures, and remain widely available in Hong Kong style teahouses. The price may vary depending on the ingredients, or establishments. It is typically considered an affordable food, and is consumed as a mid-day snack or lunch. Additionally, due to the noodle's widespread cultural influence, it can also be found in higher-end establishments with emphasis placed on better quality ingredients and technique.

== Typical combinations ==
Cart noodles is typically based upon the diner choosing various ingredients they would like, including the type of noodles, various soup broths, and toppings. Examples of types of noodles and toppings, which may vary considerably from stall to stall:

=== Toppings ===
- Pig skin (豬皮)
- Congealed pig's blood (豬紅)
- Pig intestine (豬大腸)
- Pig oviduct (生腸)
- Red Chinese sausage (紅腸)
- Pork sausage
- Chicken wing (雞翼)
- Lunch meat, typically Spam (餐肉)
- Omasum (牛百葉)
- Beef ball (牛丸)
- Beef offal
- Pork ball (豬肉丸)
- Fried fishball (炸魚蛋)
- Cuttlefish ball (墨魚丸)
- Fishcake
- Crab stick (蟹柳)
- Octopus
- Fried tofu
- Wonton (雲吞)
- Siu mai (燒賣)
- Green vegetables (蔬菜)
- Chinese radish (蘿蔔)
- Spinach
- Rehydrated shiitake mushroom (冬菇)
- Winter mushrooms

=== Noodles ===
- Ho fan (河粉)
- Thick noodles (粗麵)
- Thin noodles (幼麵)
- Oil noodles (油麵)
- Rice noodles (米粉)
- Yi mein (伊麪)
- Udon (烏冬)

=== Soup ===
The soup served can vary with the establishment and diner preferences, some options may include: beef broth, fish/seafood broth, chicken broth, laksa soup, curry soup.

== See also ==
- Cha chaan teng
- Dai pai dong
- Greasy spoon
