= Shanghai fried noodles =

Chinese noodle dish

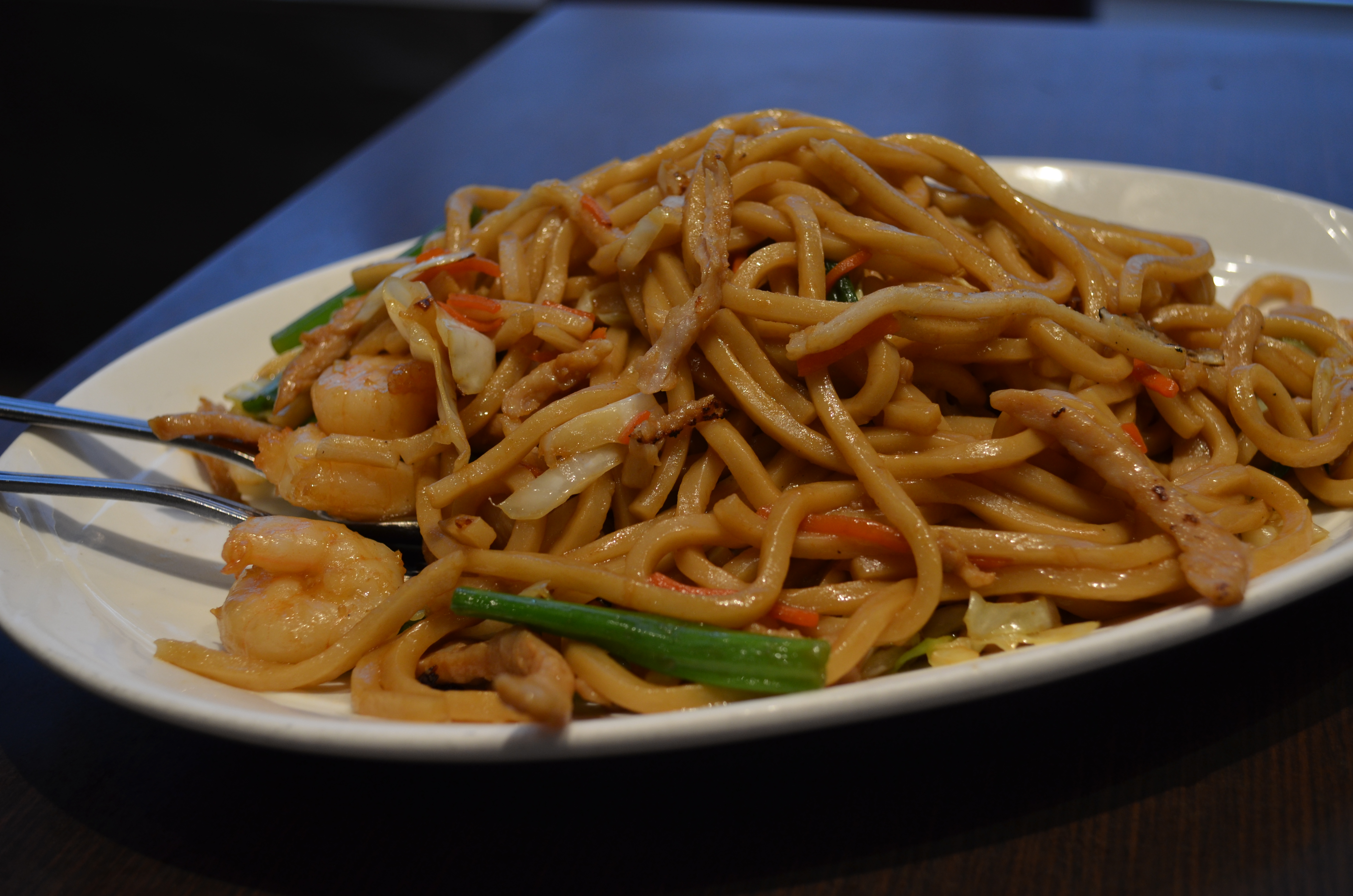
- Course: Main dishes
- Place of origin: China
- Region or state: Shanghai
- Main ingredients: beef or pork cutlets, bok choy, and onion Shanghai-style noodles

Shanghai fried noodles (Chinese: 上海粗炒; pinyin: Shànghǎi cūchǎo) is a dish made from Shanghai-style noodles, which can be found in most Chinese food markets. The more commonly known Japanese udon can be used as a substitute. The noodles are typically stir-fried with beef cutlets, bok choy, and onion, or with pork and Chinese yellow chives. The dish is a staple of Shanghai cuisine, and is usually served at dumpling houses. In recent years Shanghai fried noodles have become known to western chefs, including celebrity chef Emeril Lagasse.

== See also ==
- Fried noodles
- List of noodles
- List of noodle dishes
