= Rad naa =

Thai-Chinese noodle dish

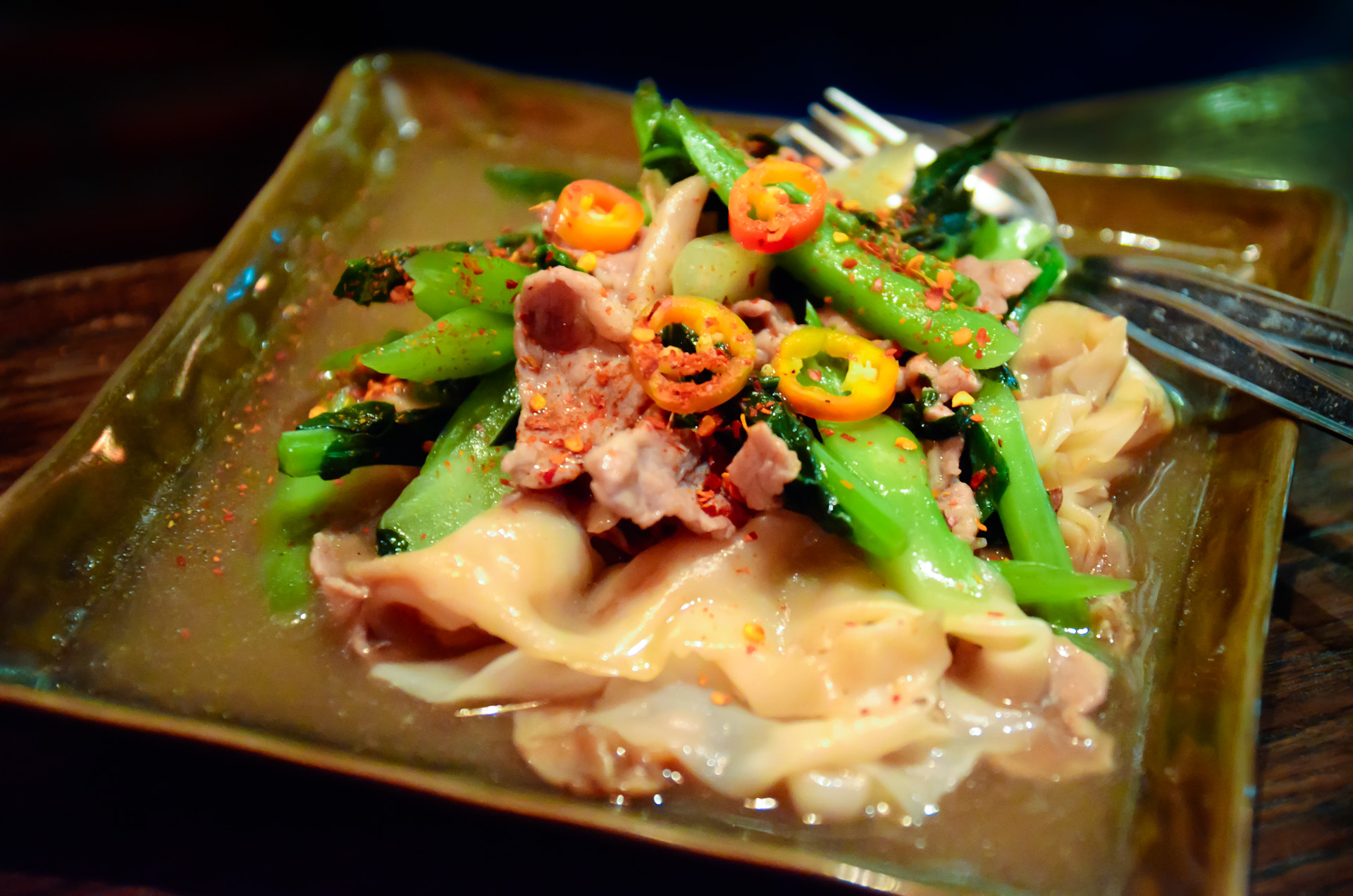
- Type: Rice noodles
- Course: Main course
- Place of origin: Thailand; Laos
- Region or state: Southeast Asia
- Associated cuisine: Thai; Lao
- Serving temperature: Hot
- Main ingredients: Shahe fen, meat (chicken, beef, pork), seafood, or tofu, sauce (stock, tapioca starch or cornstarch), soy sauce or fish sauce

Rad naa (Thai: ราดหน้า, RTGS: radna, pronounced [râːd.nâː]; Lao: ລາດໜ້າ; literally: 'topping'), also written as rad na or lad na, is a Thai-Chinese noodle dish. The name of the dish is pronounced [lâːd nâː] in Thai colloquial speech.

It is made with stir-fried wide rice noodles; a meat such as chicken, beef, pork, or seafood, or tofu; garlic, and gai lan (Thai: คะน้า; RTGS: khana). The dish is covered in a sauce made with fermented soy beans and thickened with tapioca starch or cornstarch. It is seasoned with dark soy sauce, fish sauce, and ground white pepper. In Thailand, people often sprinkle sugar, drizzle fish sauce, and add sliced chilies preserved in vinegar, as well as toasted, ground dried red chilies on the dish.

There are variants, including using rice vermicelli instead of wide noodles or deep-fried, crispy egg noodles (mi krop), with the sauce poured on top to soften them.

In areas where gai lan cannot be easily obtained, broccoli or broccolini can be used as a substitute.

== History ==
Rad na originates in China. The southern Chinese Teochew people of the Chaoshan region brought it with them to Thailand as they migrated there.

== Laos ==
In Laos, the same dish exists, and it is prepared in a similar way, with slight modifications. Gai lan is often substituted with broccoli, and straw mushrooms may be added. It is a common street food there, just as in Thailand.

== See also ==
- Pad see ew
- Beef chow fun
- Kwetiau goreng
