= Drunken chicken =

Alcoholic chicken dish

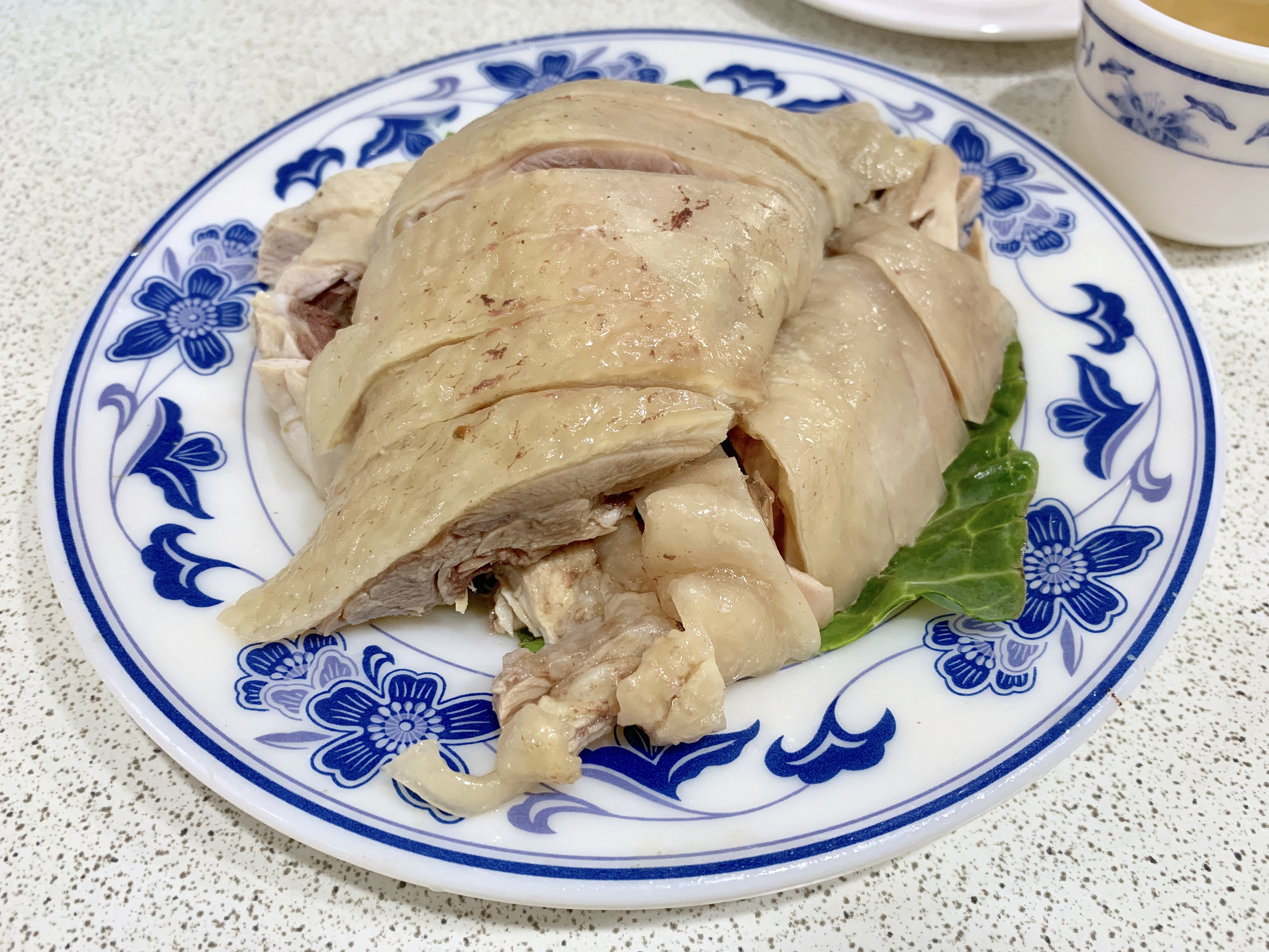
- Version of Shaoxing drunken chicken
- Traditional Chinese: 醉雞
- Simplified Chinese: 醉鸡
- Literal meaning: Drunken chicken
Transcriptions
Standard Mandarin
- Hanyu Pinyin: zuìjī
Yue: Cantonese
- Jyutping: zeoi3 gai1
Southern Min
- Hokkien POJ: chui koe

Drunken chicken (traditional Chinese: 醉雞; simplified Chinese: 醉鸡; pinyin: zuìjī) is a way of preparing chicken using alcoholic beverages. Different varieties of the dish exist in Chinese, Taiwanese, Malaysian, and Singaporean cuisines.

== Varieties ==
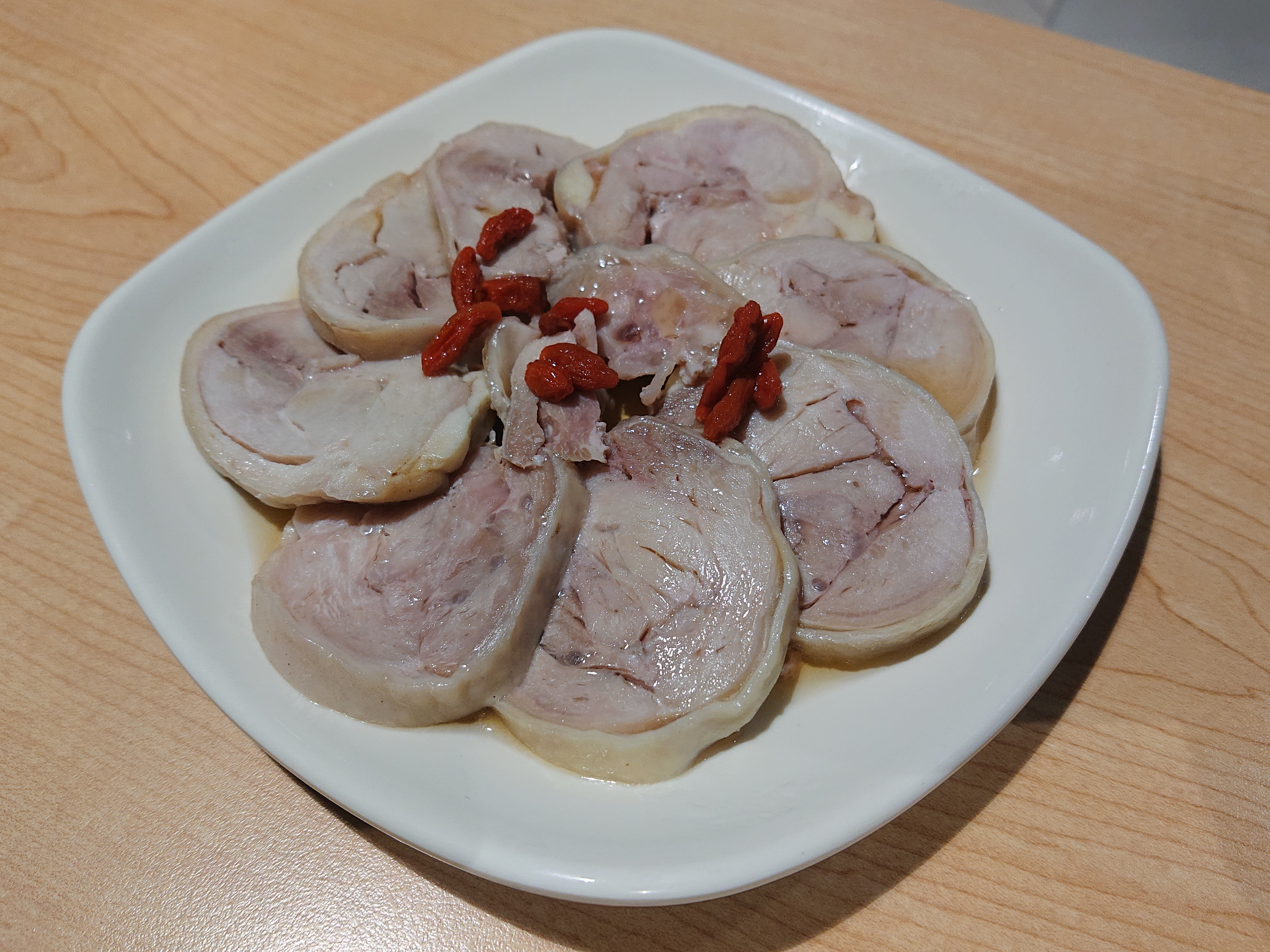
Sliced

There are many different ways of cooking drunken chicken.

One with Shaoxing wine originated in the Zhejiang province of eastern China. Shaoxing drunk chicken is cooked and marinated in Shaoxing wine to create a deep taste.

In another version of the dish, the whole chicken is first steamed then chopped up into pieces appropriately sized for picking up by chopsticks. The steamed meat, along with its juice, is cooked with scallions, ginger and salt. After the chicken is cooked it is marinated in liquor, sherry or a distilled liquor, like whiskey, overnight in the refrigerator. The chicken is served chilled, often as an appetizer. Besides the liquor-flavored meat, another feature of the dish is the liquor-flavored gelatin that results from the chilled mixture of the alcohol and the cooking juices.

== Similar dishes ==
=== Greece ===
Μεθυσμένο κοτόπουλο (methisméno kotópoulo) - drunken chicken - is a dish found with many variations in taverna in Greece and Cyprus. Served as a meze or a main course, the basic recipe consists of chicken breasts, marinated in alcohol (usually ouzo), sautéed, then braised in the marinade.

=== Latin America ===
The Argentine, Chilean, and Mexican versions of this dish are called pollo borracho, and usually include beer, chiles, and other spices.

== See also ==
- Coq au vin
- Beer can chicken
