= Cumian =

Chinese noodle dish

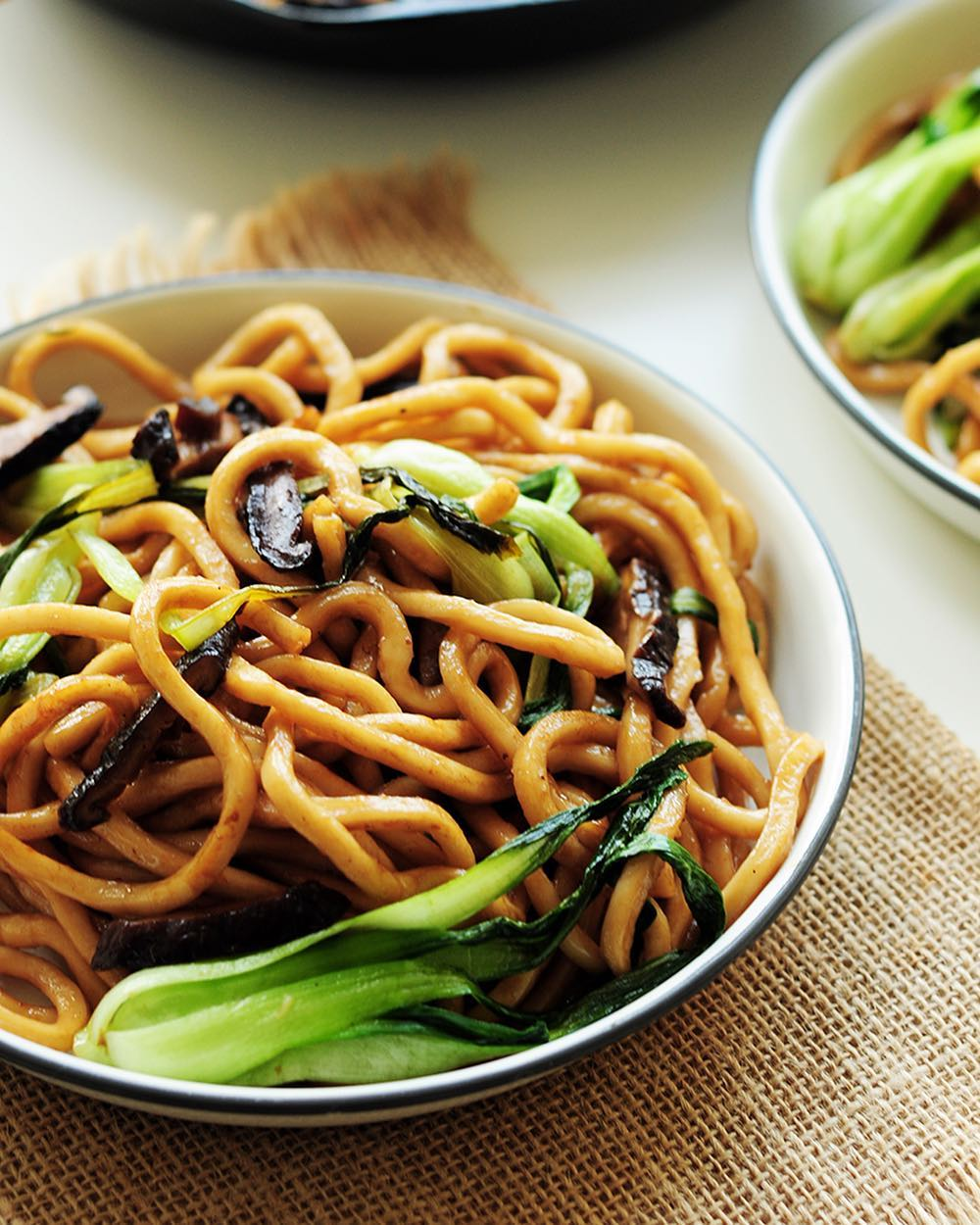
- Shanghai fried noodles
- Type: Chinese noodles
- Place of origin: China
- Region or state: East Asia
- Main ingredients: Wheat flour, water

Cumian
- Traditional Chinese: 粗麵
- Simplified Chinese: 粗面
- Literal meaning: thick noodle
Transcriptions
Standard Mandarin
- Hanyu Pinyin: cūmiàn
Yue: Cantonese
- Jyutping: cou1 min6
Southern Min
- Hokkien POJ: chho͘-mī

Cumian ([tsʰu˥mjɛn˥˩]; lit. "thick noodles") are thick Chinese noodles made from wheat flour and water. Two types of Chinese noodles are called cumian. One is Shanghai-style, thick in diameter, used in Shanghai fried noodles.

The other type is Hong Kong-style, flat and wide, sometimes yellow-alkaline. The flat cumian is a popular option in Hong Kong's cart noodles.

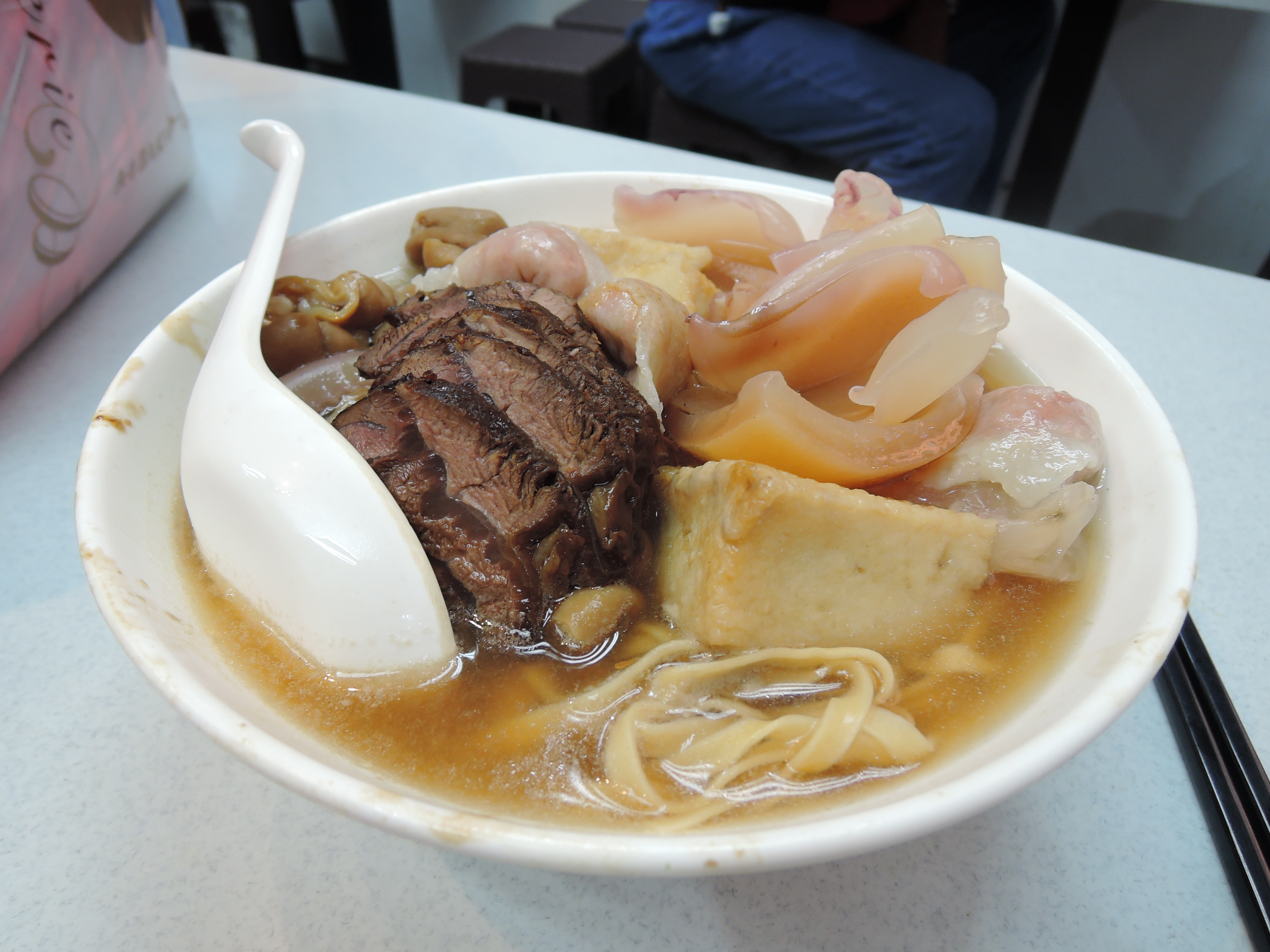
Hong Kong-style flat noodles in soup

== See also ==
- Yi mein, dried wheat-based egg noodles in Cantonese cuisine
- Garak-guksu, a thick wheat Korean noodle
- Udon, a thick wheat Japanese noodle
- Bánh canh, a thick tapioca Vietnamese noodle
- Pici, a thick wheat noodle from Tuscany
