= Garak-guksu =

Korean noodle dish

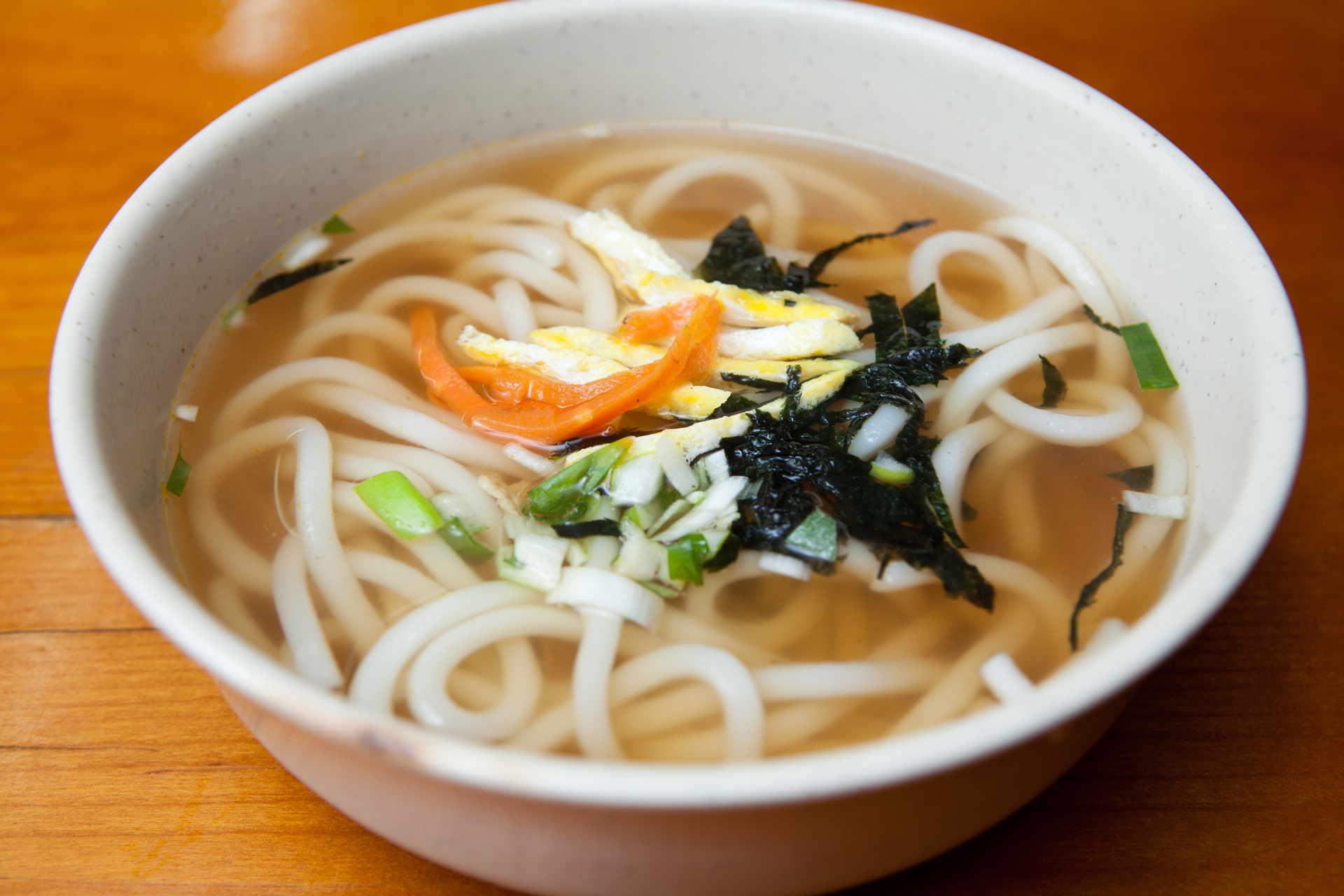
- Type: Guksu
- Place of origin: Japan, Korea
- Associated cuisine: Korean cuisine
- Similar dishes: Udon

Korean name
- Hangul: 가락국수
- RR: garakguksu
- MR: karakkuksu
- IPA: ka.ɾak̚.k͈uk̚.s͈u

In Korean cuisine, garak-guksu (가락국수) are thick wheat noodles and noodle dishes made with thick noodles.

== Preparation ==
The dough is typically made from wheat flour and salt water only. Traditionally, 360–540 millilitres (13–19 imp fl oz; 12–18 US fl oz) of salt is added per 1.8 litres (0.40 imp gal; 0.48 US gal) of water. The dough is rolled and cut with a knife.

The noodles are boiled in malgeun-jangguk (맑은장국), a soup soy sauce-based beef broth made with seasoned ground beef stir-fried in sesame oil and usually served with toppings such as egg garnish and eomuk (fish cakes).

Garak-guksu can be enjoyed cold, in which case the noodles are rinsed in icy water after they are boiled.

== Types ==
- Naembi-guksu (냄비국수; "pot noodles") − garak-guksu boiled in a pot.
- Udong (우동) – Korean adaptation of udon, a Japanese noodle dish.

== See also ==
- Cūmiàn (Chinese thick noodles)
- Udon (Japanese thick noodles)
