= Pad see ew =

Stir-fried noodle dish from Thailand

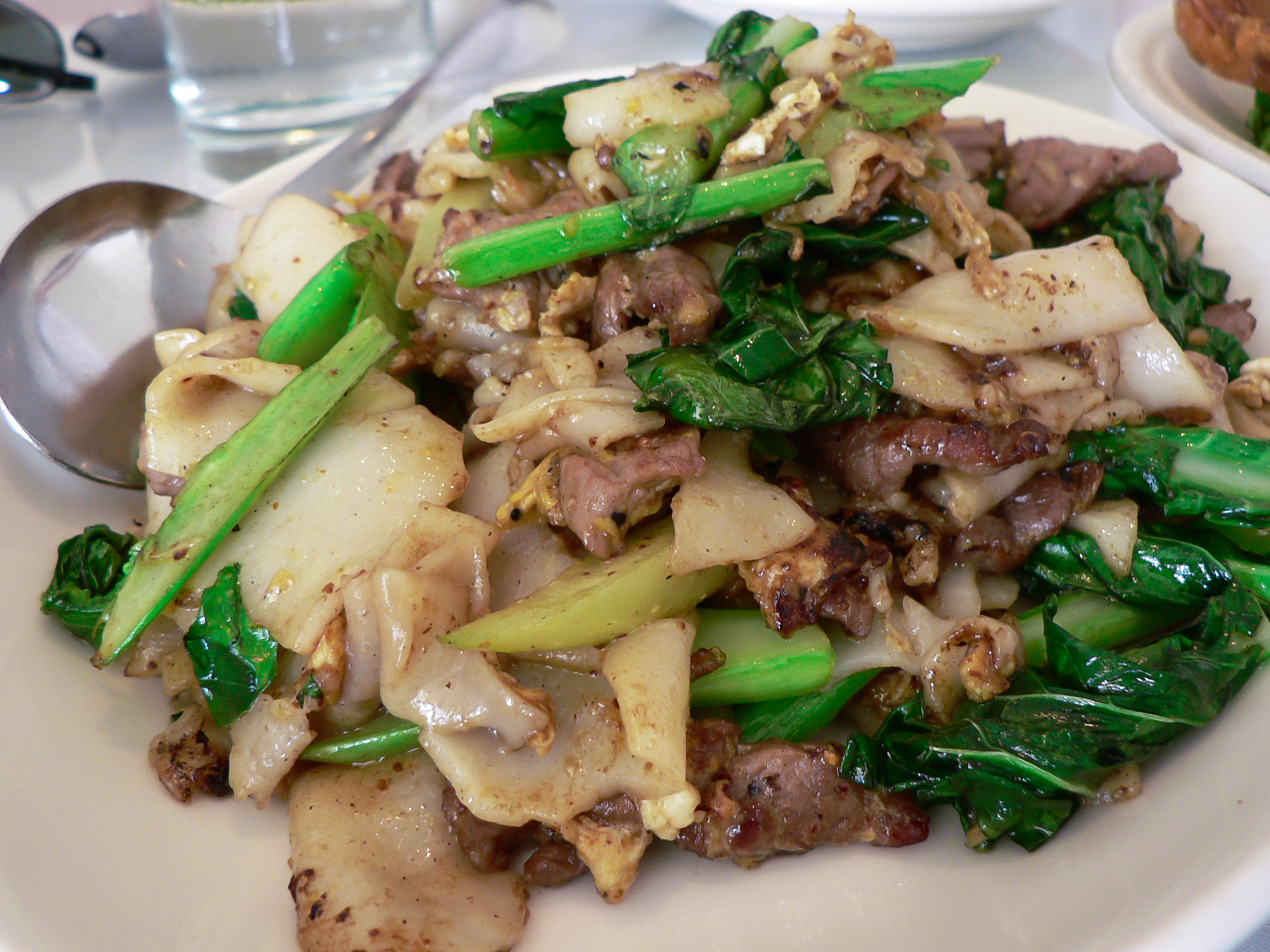
- A plate of pad see ew
- Alternative names: Phad see ew; phat see ew
- Type: Noodle
- Course: Main
- Place of origin: Thailand
- Region or state: Southeast Asia
- Associated cuisine: Thai
- Serving temperature: Hot
- Main ingredients: Shahe fen, dark soy sauce, light soy sauce, garlic, gai lan (Chinese broccoli), eggs, pork

Pad see ew (phat si-io or pad siew, Thai: ผัดซีอิ๊ว, RTGS: phat si-io, pronounced [pʰàt sīːʔíw]) is a stir-fried noodle dish that is commonly eaten in Thailand. It can be found easily among street food vendors and is also common in Thai restaurants around the world. The origins of the dish can be traced to China, from where the noodle stir-frying technique was brought.

== Preparation ==
The dish is prepared in a wok, which allows the black soy sauce added at the end of the cooking process to stick to the noodles for an exaggerated caramelizing and charring effect. The dish may look a little burnt, but the charred, smoky flavor is the defining feature of the dish.

== Etymology ==
The name of the dish translates to "fried with soy sauce". Variations of the dish can be found in other countries as well. It is very similar to the char kway teow of Malaysia and Singapore and to Cantonese chow fun. It is also similar to rat na. The difference is that pad see ew is normally stir-fried dry and made with beef, pork or other protein option, while the aforementioned dishes are served in a thickened sauce and generally have a lighter taste.

Pad see ew is sometimes also called kuaitiao phat si-io, which reflects the general practice of using fresh flat rice noodles as the main ingredient. However, thin rice noodles may also be used, for which it is called sen mi phat si-io. Egg noodles are also used in Southern Thailand, for which it is called mi lueang phat si-io (mi lueang meaning 'yellow noodle').

== Ingredients ==
Pad see ew is made with light soy sauce (''si-io khao'', similar to the regular soy sauce), dark soy sauce (si-io dam, having a more syrupy consistency), garlic, broad rice noodles called kuaitiao sen yai in Thai, gailan (Chinese broccoli), egg, and tofu or some form of thinly sliced meat – commonly pork, chicken, beef, shrimp, or mixed seafood. It is generally garnished with ground white pepper.

== See also ==
- Rad naa
- Beef chow fun
- Kwetiau goreng
- Pad thai
