= Beef chow fun =

Beef and noodle Cantonese dish

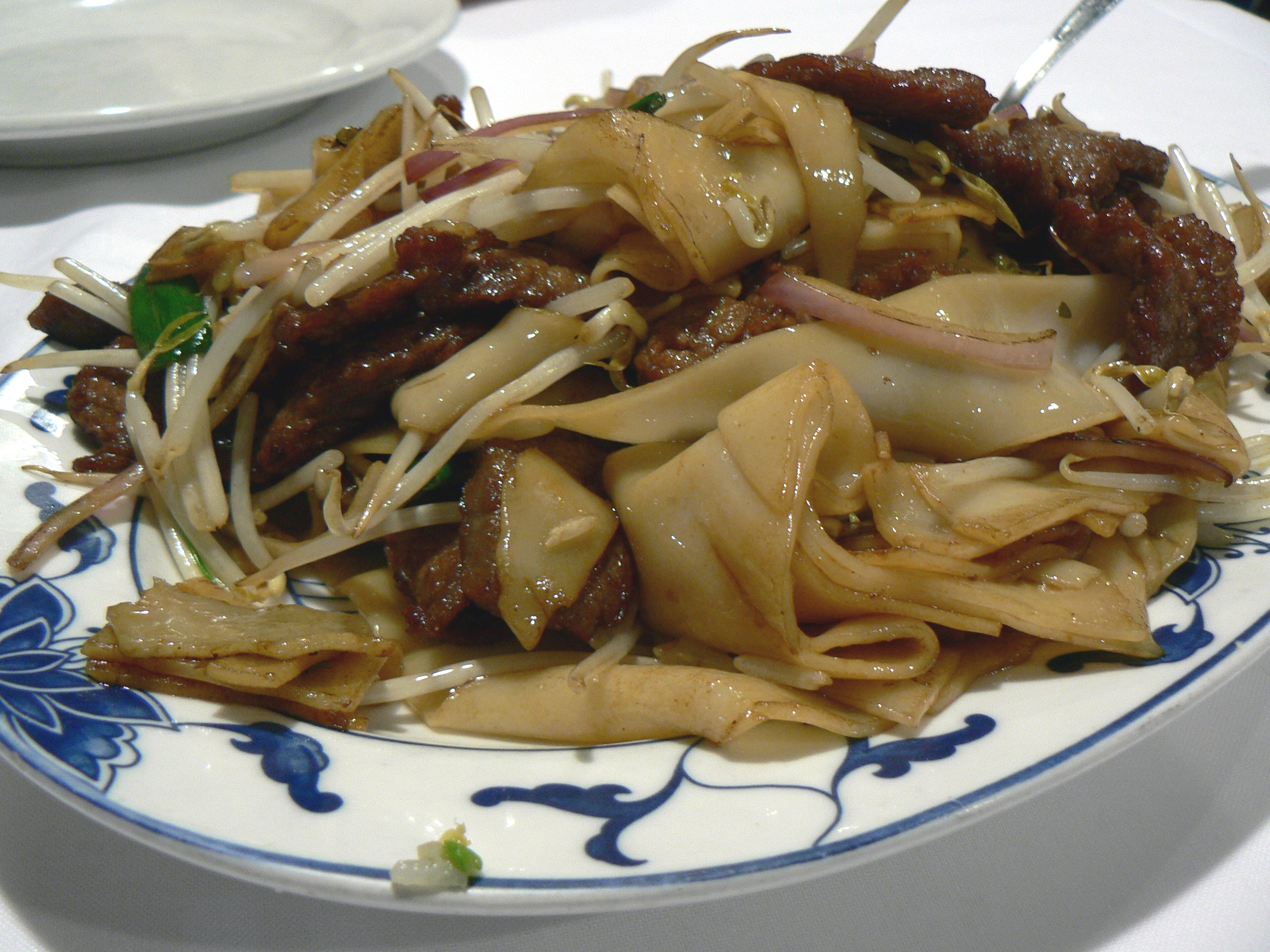
- Dry-fried beef hor fun
- Alternative names: Wide flat rice noodle
- Course: Main
- Place of origin: Guangdong, China
- Serving temperature: Hot
- Main ingredients: bean sprouts, soy sauce, rice noodles, onions

Beef chow fun
- Traditional Chinese: 乾炒牛河
- Simplified Chinese: 干炒牛河
Transcriptions
Standard Mandarin
- Hanyu Pinyin: gānchǎo níuhé
Yue: Cantonese
- Yale Romanization: gōn cháau ngàuh hó
- Jyutping: gon1 caau2 ngau4 ho2

Beef chow fun, also known as beef ho fun, gōn cháau ngàuh hó, or gānchǎo níuhé in Chinese (乾炒牛河) meaning "dry fried beef Shahe noodles", is a staple Cantonese dish made from stir-frying beef, hor fun (wide rice noodles) and bean sprouts. It is commonly found in yum cha restaurants in Guangdong Province of China, Hong Kong, and overseas, as well as in cha chaan tengs. Chow fun, or stir-fried hor fun (shahe fen) noodles, is any number of different individual preparations (and could be compared to the number of pizza varieties in United States cuisine). In the Philippines, it is called "beef hofan" (河粉).

The main ingredient of this dish is hor fun noodles, which is also known as shahe fen, originating in the town of Shahe in Guangzhou. It is a wide, flat noodle that is cut into shape (qiefen). The most common methods of cooking hor fun are in soup or stir fried. Hor fun can be dry-fried (fried only with condiments such as soy sauce) or wet-fried (fried with a thickening sauce). Today, the dry-fried variant is much more common, to the extent that the method is usually not specified—"hor fun" on a restaurant menu would refer to dry-fried hor fun. Further, wet-fried hor fun usually includes seafood, while dry-fried hor fun usually includes beef or chicken.

Sliced beef is marinated first. Then, the beef is seared in a wok; this is important to obtain the signature taste of beef chow fun (wok hei). Other ingredients and the hor fun noodles are added, then combined with the beef and sauce. The bean sprouts are then stir-fried with the rest of the chow fun until they are tender and the dish is ready to serve.

An important factor in the making of this dish is wok hei (鑊氣). The cooking must be done over a high flame and the stirring must be done quickly. Not only must the hor fun be stirred quickly, it must not be handled too strongly or it will break into pieces. The amount of oil also needs to be controlled very well; if not, the excess oil or dry texture will ruin the dish. Because of these factors, this dish is a major test for chefs in Cantonese cooking. This wok hei provides an almost charred flavor which is hard to obtain without high heat.

== History ==
The origin of chow fun is unknown, but there is a legend concerning the origin of dry-fried chow fun:

During World War II, a man named Mr. Hui migrated from Canton to Hunan to become a chef. He then was forced back to his hometown due to the Japanese invasion. The story continues: "One night, Mr Hui's food stall ran out of powder (potato starch), which was needed for sauces. A military [commander] was hungry and wanted to have his wet chow fun. Due to a curfew [they were] unable to go purchase the powder... It is also said the commander was so mad he was about to take out his gun and kill someone. Mr Hui's mom and brother immediately went to make some tong yuen (sticky rice dessert dumplings) and Mr Hui himself tended to the kitchen. It was there that he thought about doing it dry stir fried style, and thus the stall (and his family) were spared from the bullet.

== See also ==
- Kwetiau sapi
- Kwetiau goreng
- Char kway teow
- Chinese noodles
- List of noodle dishes
- Shahe fen
