= List of Burmese dishes =

The following is a list of dishes found in Burmese cuisine. Burmese cuisine includes dishes from various regions of Burma (now officially known as Myanmar). The diversity of Myanmar's cuisine has also been contributed to by the myriad of local ethnic minorities. The Bamars are the most dominant group, but other groups including the Chin people also have distinct cuisines. Burmese cuisine is characterized by extensive use of fish products like fish sauce and ngapi (fermented seafood). Owing to the geographic location of Myanmar, Burmese cuisine has been influenced by Chinese cuisine, Indian cuisine and Thai cuisine.

== Burmese salads ==
| Burmese name | Burmese script | Image | Origin | Description |
|---|---|---|---|---|
| Bazun thoke | ပုစွန်သုပ် | | | Pickled prawn salad. |
| Gyin thoke | ချင်းသုပ် | | | Ginger salad with sesame seeds and assorted fried beans. |
| Khauk swè thoke | ခေါက်ဆွဲသုပ် | | | Wheat noodle salad with dried shrimps, shredded cabbage and carrots, dressed with fried peanut oil, fish sauce and lime. |
| Htamin thoke | ထမင်းသုပ် | | | Rice salad with tomato puree, potato, glass noodle, toasted chickpea flour, crushed toasted dried fermented beancake, crushed dried shrimp, crushed dried chilli, garlic and dressed with cooked peanut oil, fish sauce, lime or tamarind and coriander. |
| Let thoke sone | လက်သုပ်စုံ (အသုပ်စုံ) | | | Similar to htamin thoke with shredded green papaya, shredded carrot, ogonori sea moss and often wheat noodles. |
| Nan gyi thoke | နန်းကြီးသုပ် | | | Thick rice noodle salad with chickpea flour, chicken, fish cake (nga hpe), onions, coriander, spring onions, crushed dried chilli, dressed with fried crispy onion oil, fish sauce and lime. |
| Nanbyagyi thoke | နန်းပြားသုပ် | | | As above with tagliatelle. |
| Shauk thi thoke | ရှောက်သီးသုပ် | | | Sliced lemon or kaffir lime (no pith or rind), toasted chickpea flour, crushed roasted peanut, crushed dried shrimp, crushed dried chilli, baked fish paste, cooked oil with onions (often served with kya zan hinga). |
| Samuza thoke | စမူဆာသုပ် | | Indian | Samosa salad with onions, cabbage, fresh mint, potato curry, masala, chili powder, salt and lime. |
| Lahpet thoke | လက်ဖက်သုပ် | | Shan | A salad of pickled tea leaves with fried peas, peanuts and garlic, toasted sesame, fresh garlic, tomato, green chili, crushed dried shrimps, preserved ginger and dressed with peanut oil, fish sauce and lime. |
| Nga baung thoke | ငါးပေါင်းသုပ် | | Mon | Mixed vegetables and prawn, wrapped in morinda leaves and banana leaves outside. |
| Kya zan thoke | ကြာဆံသုပ် | | Rakhine | Glass vermicelli salad with boiled prawn julien and mashed curried duck eggs and potatoes. |
| Thayet chin thoke | သရက်ချဉ်သုပ် | | | Fermented green mango salad with onions, green chilli, roasted peanuts, sesame and peanut oil. |
| Thinbaw thi thoke | သင်္ဘောသီးသုပ် | | Shan and Thai | Papaya salad of shredded papaya, mixed with ground dried shrimp, onions, and fried garlic; tossed in garlic oil, lemon juice, and a little hot chili pepper. |
| Tofu thoke | တိုဟူးသုပ် | | Shan | Fresh yellow tofu, cut into small rectangular slices, dressed and garnished with peanut oil, dark soy sauce, rice vinegar, toasted crushed dried chilli, crushed garlic, crushed roasted peanuts, crisp-fried onions, and coriander. |

== Bamar-influenced ==
| Burmese name | Burmese script | Image | Origin | Description |
|---|---|---|---|---|
| Mohinga | မုန့်ဟင်းခါး | | | The unofficial national dish of rice vermicelli in fish broth with onions, garlic, ginger, lemon grass and sliced tender core of banana-stem, served with boiled eggs, fried fish cake (nga hpe) and fritters (akyaw). |
| Kat kyi kaik | ကပ်ကြေးညှပ်‌ | | Dawei, Myeik | Lit. 'cut with scissors', a southern coastal dish (from the Dawei area) of rice noodles with a variety of seafood, land meats, raw bean sprouts, beans and fried eggs comparable to pad thai. |
| Kya yoe hinga | ကြာရိုးဟင်းခါး | | | Lotus roots in clear chicken or fish broth. |
| Kyar zan hinga | ကြာဆံဟင်းခါး | | | Glass noodle soup with dried shrimp, wood-ear mushrooms, egg, dried flowers, onions. |
| Ngapi jet | ငါးပိချက် | | | Fermented spicy fish paste or salted fish curried with onions, tomatoes, garlic, chilli and coriander served with to za ya, vegetables fresh or boiled, on the side. |
| Ngapi gyaw | ငါးပိကြော် | | | Fried version with dried shrimp, onions, garlic and dried chilli. |
| Hsi htamin | ဆီထမင်း | | | Glutinous rice cooked with turmeric and onions in peanut oil, and served with toasted sesame and crisp fried onions, a popular breakfast like kao hnyin baung and ngacheik paung. |

== Chinese-inspired ==
| Burmese name | Burmese script | Image | Origin | Description |
|---|---|---|---|---|
| Kyay oh | ကြေးအိုး | | Chinese (from quetayong) | Vermicelli noodles in soup with pork offal and greens. |
| Be kin | ဘဲကင် | | Chinese | Roasted duck. |
| Hpet htoke | ဖက်ထုပ် | | Chinese | Lit. leaf wrap, of meat, pastry paper, ginger, garlic, pepper powder, salt. Usually served with soup or with noodles. |
| Htamin gyaw | ထမင်း‌ကြော် | | Chinese | Fried rice with boiled peas (pè byouk). |
| Kaw yay khauk swè | ကော်‌ရည်ခေါက်ဆွဲ | | Sino-Burmese | Noodles and curried duck (or pork) in broth with eggs. |
| Mi swun | မီဆွမ် | | Chinese | Very soft rice noodles, known as Mee suah in Singapore and Malaysia. It is a popular option for invalids, usually with chicken broth. |
| Panthay khauk swè | ပန်းသေးခေါက်ဆွဲ | | Chinese | Halal noodles with chicken and spices, often served by the Muslim Panthay Chinese. |
| Pauk see | ပေါက်‌စီ | | Chinese | Steamed buns filled with either pork and egg or sweet bean paste. |
| San byoke | ဆန်ပြုတ် | | Chinese | Rice congee with fish, chicken or duck often fed to invalids. |
| Si gyet khauk swè | ဆီချက်ခေါက်ဆွဲ | | Chinese | Wheat noodles with duck or pork, fried garlic oil, soy sauce and chopped spring onions. It is considered an 'identity dish' of Myanmar and Burmese Chinese, as it is not available in other Chinese cuisines. Sarawak's Kolok mee is a bit similar. |
| Wet tha doke htoe | ဝက်သားတုတ်ထိုး | | Chinese | Pork offal cooked in light soy sauce. Eaten with raw ginger and chilli sauce. |

== Indian-inspired ==
| Burmese name | Burmese script | Image | Origin | Description |
|---|---|---|---|---|
| Chapati | ချပါတီ | | Indian | Fried chapati, crispy and blistered, with boiled peas (pè-byohk), a popular breakfast next to nan bya. |
| Danbauk | ဒံပေါက်‌ | | Indian | Burmese-style biryani with either chicken or mutton served with mango pickle, fresh mint and green chili. |
| Htat taya | ထပ်တစ်ရာ | | Indian | Lit. "a hundred layers", fried flaky multilayered paratha with either a sprinkle of sugar or pè byouk. |
| Htawbat htamin | ထောပတ်ထမင်း | | Indian | Literally "butter rice," rice made with butter and mostly eaten with chicken curry. |
| Nan bya | နံပြား | | Indian | Burmese style naan buttered or with pè byouk, also with mutton soup. |
| Palata | ပလာတာ | | Indian | Burmese style paratha with egg or mutton. |
| Samusa | စမူဆာ | | Indian | Burmese-style samosa with mutton and onions served with fresh mint, green chilli, onions and lime. |
| Kyit Sara | | | Indian | Semolina chicken or meat paste, Chicken or meat is boiled or cooked and removed all the bones and skin. It is then mixed with Semolina and dhal and pulverised in a grinder, or in older recipes by stirring it in a big pot and pounding it using a big ladle. Once it turns into a thick paste it is sprinkled with cinnamon powder and deep-fried onion. |
| Shai Mai or Sa Wai | | | Indian | Roasted Seviyan Kheer boiled in sweet milk, served with fried cashews, raisins and coconut shreds. |
| Theezohn Chinyay Hin | | | Indian | Adaptation of South Indian Sambar, lit. vegetable all- sorts sour broth, with drumstick, lady's finger, egg plant, green beans, potato, onions, ginger, dried chilli, boiled egg, dried salted fish, fish paste and tamarind. |

== Kachin-inspired ==
| English name | Burmese name | Image | Origin | Description |
|---|---|---|---|---|
| Kachin-style chicken curry | Chyet Kachin chet | | Kachin | Kachin-style chicken curry is cooked with a variety of local herbs. The Kachin usually cook this dish without oil for health reasons. |
| Kachin pounded beef | Kachin ametar chyawk thawng | | Kachin | Kachin pounded beef with herbs. The dish is unusual in that the beef is boiled, then fried, and then pounded in a mortar with spices, local mints, Sichuan pepper, chillies, garlic, and ginger. |

== Rakhine-inspired ==
| Burmese name | Burmese script | Image | Origin | Description |
|---|---|---|---|---|
| Mont di | မုန့်တီ | | Rakhine | A popular and economical fast food dish where rice vermicelli are either eaten with some condiments and soup prepared from nga-pi, or as a salad with powdered fish and some condiments. The daggertooth pike conger, called nga-shwe in Arakanese and Burmese, is the fish of choice. |
| Ngapi daung | ငါးပိထောင်း | | Rakhine | An extremely spicy condiment made from pounded ngapi and green chilli. |
| Khayan thee nga chauk chet | ခရမ်းသီးငါးခြောက်ချက် | | Rakhine | Brinjal cooked lightly with a small amount of oil, with dried fish and chilli. |

== Shan-inspired ==
| Burmese name | Burmese script | Image | Origin | Description |
|---|---|---|---|---|
| Shan khauk swè | ရှမ်းခေါက်ဆွဲ | | Shan | Rice noodles with chicken or minced pork, onions, garlic, tomatoes, chili, crushed roasted peanuts, young vine of mangetout, served with tohu jaw or tohu nway and pickled mustard greens (monnyinjin). |
| Htamin jin | ထမင်းချဉ် | | Shan | A rice, tomato and potato or fish salad kneaded into round balls dressed and garnished with crisp fried onion in oil, tamarind sauce, coriander and spring onions often with garlic, Chinese chives roots (ju myit), fried whole dried chili, grilled dried fermented beancakes (pè bouk) and fried dried topu (topu jauk kyaw) on the side. |
| Meeshay | မြီးရှေ‌ | | Shan. | rice noodles with pork or chicken, bean sprouts, rice flour gel, rice flour fritters, dressed with soy sauce, salted soybean, rice vinegar, fried peanut oil, chilli oil, and garnished with crisp fried onions, crushed garlic, coriander, and pickled white radish OR mustard greens |
| Shan tohu | ရှမ်းတိုဟူး | | Shan | A type of tofu made from chickpea flour or yellow split pea eaten as fritters (tohpu jaw) or in a salad (tohpu thohk), also eaten hot before it sets as tohu byawk aka tohu nway and as fried dried tohpu (tohu jauk kyaw). |
| Wet tha chin | ဝက်သားချဉ် | | Shan | Preserved minced pork in rice. |
| Wet tha hmyit chin | ဝက်သားမျှစ်ချဉ် | | Shan | Pork with sour bamboo shoots. |
| Kauk hnyin baung | ကောက်ညှင်းပေါင်း | | Shan | Cooked glutinous rice with meat on a banana leaf. |
| Hin thote | ဟင်းထုပ် | | Shan | Steamed meat and flour in banana leaves. |

== Mon-inspired ==
| Burmese name | Burmese script | Image | Origin | Description |
|---|---|---|---|---|
| Thingyan htamin | သင်္ကြန်ထမင်း | | Mon | Fully boiled rice in candle-smelt jasmine water served with mango salad and fried dried-prawn. |
| Wet mohinga | ရေစိမ်မုန့်ဟင်းခါး | | Mon | Like mohinga but vermicelli is served while wet. |

== Karen inspired ==
| Burmese name | Burmese script | Image | Origin | Description |
|---|---|---|---|---|
| Talabaw | တာလပေါ | | Karen | Primary ingredient is bamboo shoots, with a small amount of rice and some shreds of meat or seafood. One of the most well known soups in Myanmar, and widely considered to be the essential dish of Karen cuisine. |

== Hin ==
| Burmese name | Burmese script | Image | Origin | Description |
|---|---|---|---|---|
| Kyar zan hin | ကြာဆံဟင်း | | Mandalay | glass noodle soup with chicken, wood-ear mushrooms, dried flowers, onions, boiled egg, garnished with coriander, thin-sliced onions, crushed dried chilli and a dash of lime. |
| Kalar hin | ကုလားဟင်း | | South Indian | A South Indian dish made of dried snakefish, radish, carrots, eggplant, and okra. |
| Si byan | ဆီပြန် | | | Dish of meat or fish with condiments cooked in oil and water until all the water is boiled off leaving the meat or fish in an oily gravy. |
| Cho chin gyaw | ချိုချဉ်ကြော် | | | Sweet and sour dish of meat or fish with vegetables. |
| A sein gyaw | အစိမ်းကြော် | | Chinese | Dish of fried green vegetables with meat, cabbage, cauliflower, carrot, green beans, baby corn, cornflour or tapioca starch, tomatoes, squid sauce. |

== Desserts ==
| Burmese name | Burmese script | Image | Origin | Description |
|---|---|---|---|---|
| Halawa | ဟလဝါ | | Pathein, Middle East origin | A snack made of sticky rice, butter, coconut milk, from Indian dessert halwa. Burmese halawa is in a loose form, something like smashed potato, without baking into a hard or firmer cake in contrast to sanwin makin. |
| Phaluda | ဖာလူဒါ | | Indian | Similar to the Indian dessert falooda, rose water, milk, jello, coconut jelly, coconut shavings, sometimes served with custard and ice cream. |
| Shwe yin aye | ရွှေရင်အေး | | | Agar jelly, tapioca and sago in coconut milk. |
| Shwe gyi mont | ရွှေကြည်မုန့် | | Mon | Hardened semolina (wheat) porridge cake with poppy seeds, sugar, butter, coconut. |
| Sanwin makin | ဆနွင်းမကင်း | | Thai | Semolina (sooji) cake with raisins, walnuts and poppy seeds. |
| Mont let saung | မုန့်လက်ဆောင်း | | Shan? | Tapioca balls, glutinous rice, grated coconut and toasted sesame with jaggery syrup in coconut milk. |
| Kyauk kyaw | ကျောက်ကျော | | | Agar jelly usually set in two layers with coconut milk. |
| Sut-hnan | | | Rakhine | Millet cooked in sweet milk with raisins. |
| Htoe mont | ထိုးမုန့် | | Mandalay | Glutinous rice cake with raisins, cashews and coconut shavings. |
| Malaing lone | မလိုင်လုံး | | Indian | Burmese-style gulab jamun. |
| Mont kalama | မုန့်ကုလားမ | | Indian | Toffee-like delicacy made of coconut milk, jaggery, and rice flour. |
| Saw hlaing mont | | | Rakhine | A baked sweet, made from millet, raisins, coconut and butter. |
| Nga pyaw thi baung | | | Rakhine | Bananas stewed in milk and coconut, and garnished with black sesame. Eaten either as a dish during meals, or as a dessert. |
| Ngapyaw baung | ငှက်ပျောပေါင်း | | Mon | Banana pudding dessert made from banana boiled in coconut milk and sugar. |
| Htamanè | ထမနဲ | | Mon | Savory dessert made from glutinous rice, fried shredded coconuts, peanuts, sesame seeds, oil. |
| Duyin yoe | ဒူရင်းယို | | Mon | Durian jam (Katut jam). |
| La mont | လမုန့် | | Chinese | An oily disk-shaped cake filled with either sugar or sweet bean paste. |
| Mont lone yay paw | မုန့်လုံးရေပေါ် | | | Glutinous rice balls with jaggery (palm sugar). |
| Thagu pyin | သာကူပြင် | | Malay | Sago or tapioca pudding sweetened with jaggery and enriched with coconut. |
| Mont pyar thalet | မုန့်ပျားသလက် | | | Batter cake shaped like a honeycomb, made of rice flour with or without palm sugar syrup. |
| Mont kyoe lein | မုန့်ကြိုးလိမ် | | | Pretzel-like confection made of rice and bean flour. |
| Mont lay pway | မုန့်လေပွေ | | | Thin large crispies made from glutinous rice. |
| Mont lin mayar or mont oke galay | မုန့်လင်မယား or မုန့်အုပ်ကလေး | | | Snack of rice flour batter fried to a hemispherical shape in a dimpled pan, and served in pairs. |
| Pashu mont | ပသျှူးမုန့် | | Malay | Confection of roasted glutinous rice flour mixed with sugar and coconut shreds. |
| Gadut mont | ကတွတ်မုန့် | | Indian | Kind of Hindi sweetmeat in the form of a dumpling. |
| Bein mont | ဘိန်းမုန့် | | | Pancake made of rice flour, palm sugar, coconut chips, and peanuts, garnished with poppy seeds. |
| Khauk mont | ခေါက်မုန့် | | | Kind of circular pan- cake made of rice flour, palmsugar, coconut, etc. and folded to form a semicircle. |
| Aung bala mont | အောင်ဗလမုန့် | | | Rice pancake topped with syrup. |
| Mont kywe the | မုန့်ကျွဲသည်း | | | Pudding made of coarse rice flour boiled in palm sugar and lime water. |
| Yay mont | ရေမုန့် | | | Almost translucent sheets of rice flour folded around a filling of beans and coriander leaves. |
| Mont leik pyar | မုန့်လိပ်ပြာ | | | Thin rice dough skins with a centre filled with jaggery and coconut, and folded in squares. |
| Nan ka htaing | နံကထိုင် | | Indian | Nankatai, an Indian cake made of saffron, flour, sugar and butter. |
| Ladu mont | လဒူမုန့် | | Indian | Sweetmeat of Indian origin in the form of a ball. |
| Gyalabi | ဂျလေဘီ | | Indian | Jalebi, kind of Indian sweetmeat. |
| Kulfee | ကူလ်ဖီ | | Indian | Frozen dessert made of milk. |
| Dein gyin | ဒိန်ချဉ် | | | Burmese style yoghurt served with jaggery syrup. |
| Shwe htamin | ရွှေထမင်း | | | Baked sweetened glutinous rice and jaggery and garnished with coconut shavings. |
| Kao hlaingti mont | ကောက်လှိုင်းတီမုန့် | | | A snack made of sticky rice and local violet flowers as colouring. |

== See also ==
- Burmese cuisine
- List of ingredients in Burmese cuisine
