= Mohnyin tjin =

Burmese fermented vegetables in rice wine

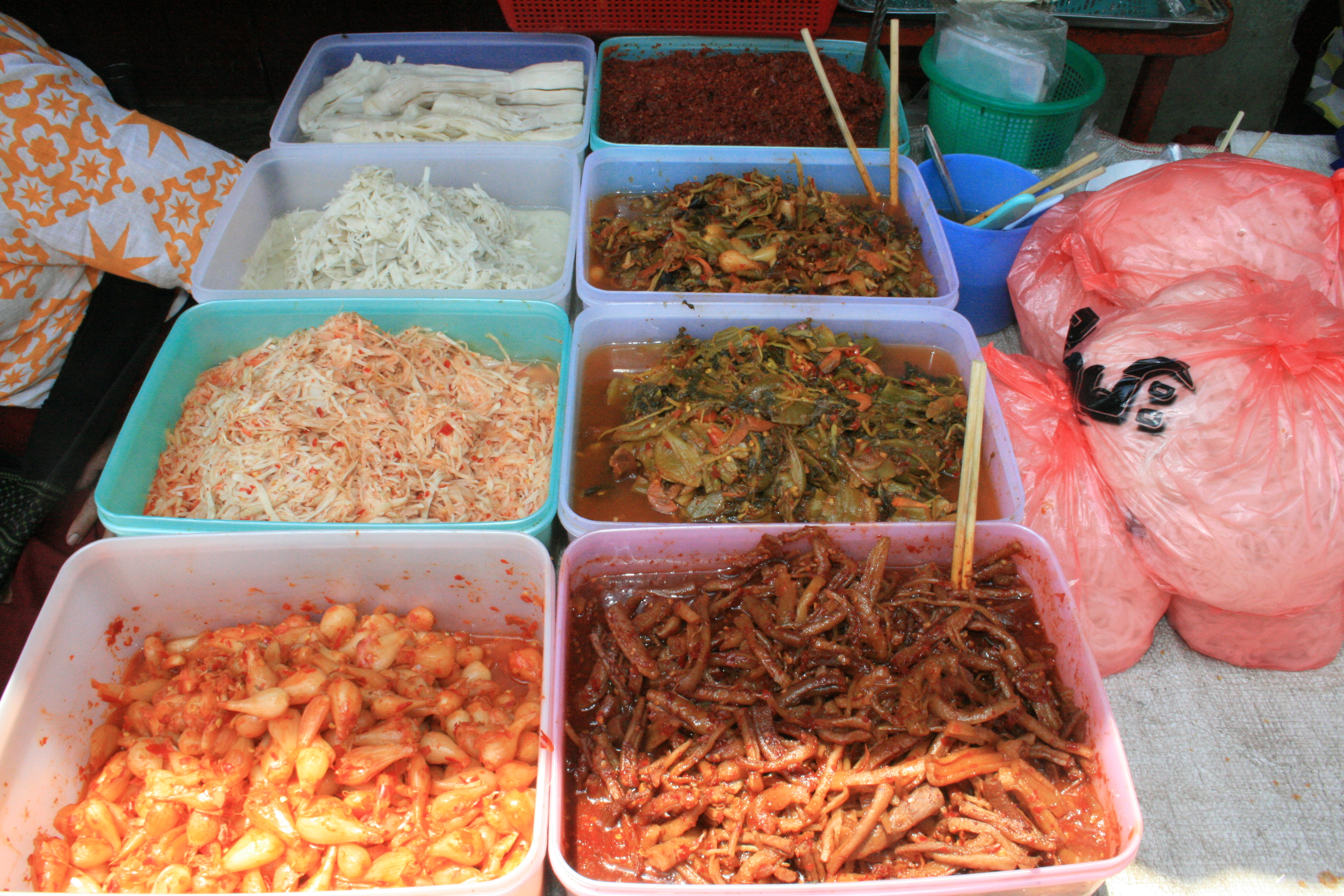
- Mohnyin Tjin Seller at Taunggyi, May 2010
- Place of origin: Burma
- Associated cuisine: Burmese cuisine
- Main ingredients: vegetables; rice wine; various seasonings
- Similar dishes: Kimchi, Chinese pickles

Mohnyin Tjin, (မုန်ညင်းချဉ် [mòʊɰ̃ɲɪ́ɰ̃ dʑɪ̀ɰ̃]; also Mon Nyin Jin, Mohn-hnyin Gyin) is a popular Burmese cuisine fermented food dish of vegetables preserved in rice wine and various seasonings. It is similar to Korean Kimchi and Japanese Takana Tsukemono. Mohnyin Tjin is popularly associated with the Shan and is a ubiquitous condiment for Shan dishes such as meeshay and shan khauk swè.

Mohnnyin tjin is refers to a wide number of pickled and fermented vegetables. The name means "sour mustard green" and pickled white radish leaves are also used in the most common version.

Generically 'a-chin' (pickle) can be made from almost any vegetable.

== Main ingredients ==
The most common form of mohnyin tjin is actually a mix of mainly white radish leaves, with mustard greens, carrots, leek bulbs, ginger and garlic chives. These vegetables are pickled in glutinous rice, rice wine, fresh crushed chillis, spices and cane sugar.

The variety is achieved by substituting the vegetables. Other popular 'a-chin' are made with baby elephant garlic, white radish stems, garlic chives, cabbage, cauliflower, chili pepper, bean sprouts, unripe mangoes and bamboo shoots.

== See also ==
- Kimchi – Korean side dish of fermented vegetables
- Chinese pickles – Vegetables or fruits that have been fermented by pickling with salt and brine
