= Meeshay =

Noodle dish from Myanmar

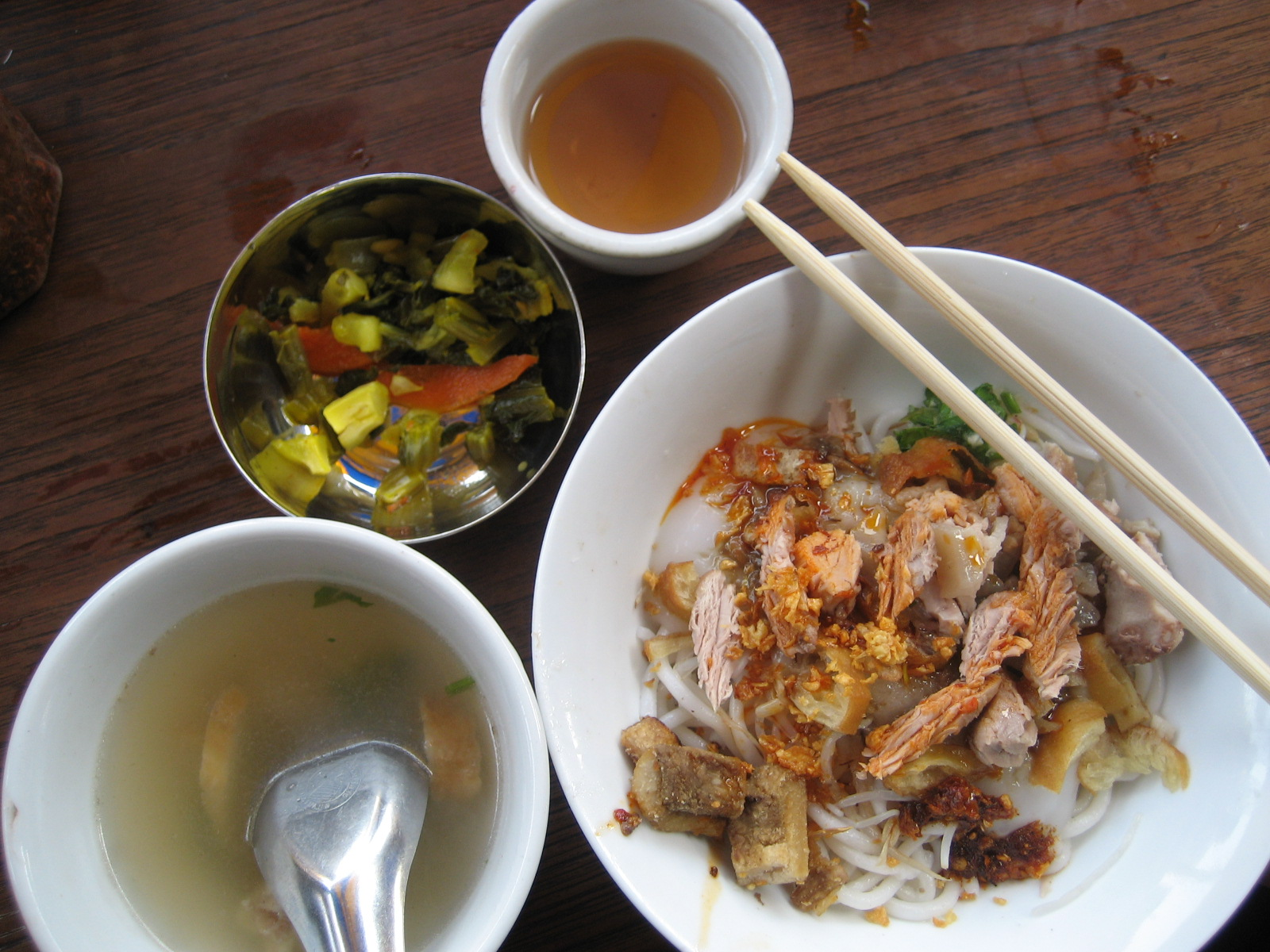
- Meeshay
- Alternative names: မြီးရှည်
- Course: Breakfast, Brunch
- Place of origin: Myanmar
- Region or state: Shan State
- Main ingredients: Rice noodles, meat (chicken or pork) sauce, bean sprouts, rice flour gel, onions, garlic, chickpea flour, coriander

Meeshay (Burmese: မြီးရှေ; MLCTS: mri: hre, pronounced [mjíʃè]; also spelt mi shay, mee shay, mee shei) is a Burmese cuisine dish of rice noodles with a meat sauce. The dish originated from the Chinese mixian (simplified Chinese: 米线) and became a specialty of the Shan people of Eastern Myanmar. Regional variants exist, but the two main types are the normal Mogok meeshay and the Mandalay version. Myay-oh meeshay (lit. 'claypot meeshay') is a Yunnanese version in which the rice noodles are cooked in a clay pot and the dish is served with a large quantity of soup and fresh vegetables.

The meat sauce is mainly made with pork or chicken. All forms of meeshay may be accompanied by mohnyin tjin (a popular Shan pickle made of mustard greens, carrots and other vegetables fermented in rice wine) and clear soup usually of chicken broth with scallions. Another common side dish to meeshay is fried Burmese tofu fritters.

Although a distinctly Shan dish, meeshay is popular in the major towns across Myanmar (Burma). Restaurant chains devoted to Shan dishes are popular in Yangon where meeshay is one of the top choices amongst customers. Meeshay and other Shan dishes, are rich and comparatively bland (without the optional chilli flakes) due to the Highland culture of the Shan people. They are seen as novelty foods for typical city and town dwellers, as they present a deviation from typical Burmese cuisine dishes. Meeshay is a popular breakfast, brunch and light lunch option for many folks in Myanmar's cities and towns.

== Variations ==
=== Shan / Mogok meeshay ===
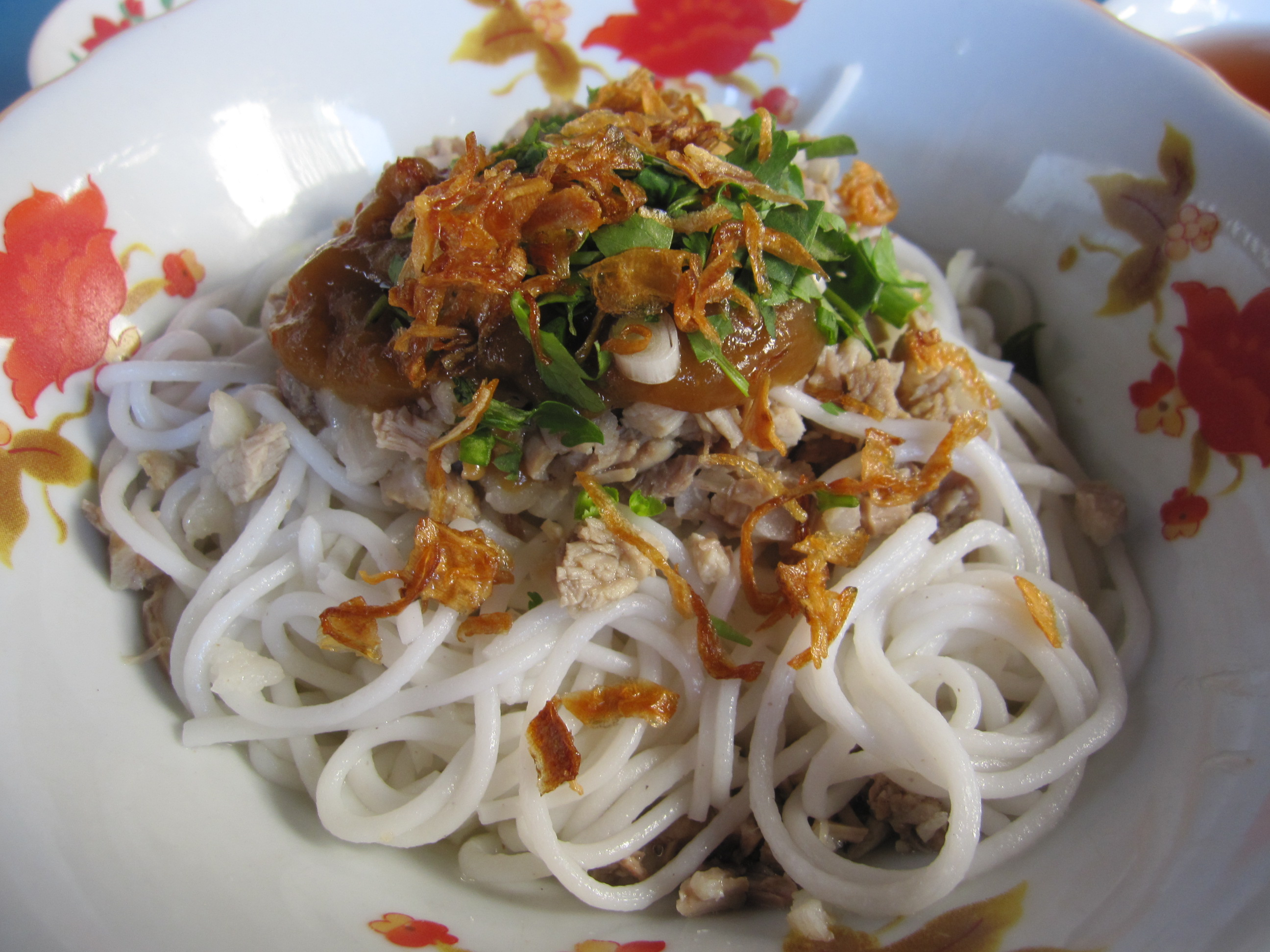
Mogok Meeshay

In the original dish of meeshay, also called Mogok meeshay, the meat is cooked in a light sauce with onion, and is mixed with rice noodles. Alongside the meat sauce, a brown tangy rice flour gel with cane or rice vinegar, a dressing of soy sauce, fried peanut oil, chilli oil, and a garnish of crisp fried onions, spring onions and coriander are also added. A similar dish with tomatoes, called Shan khauk swè, is a 'soup version' without the gel, and fish sauce instead of soy sauce, with flat or round noodles, where the soup is part of the dish itself, rather than as consommé.

=== Mandalay meeshay ===
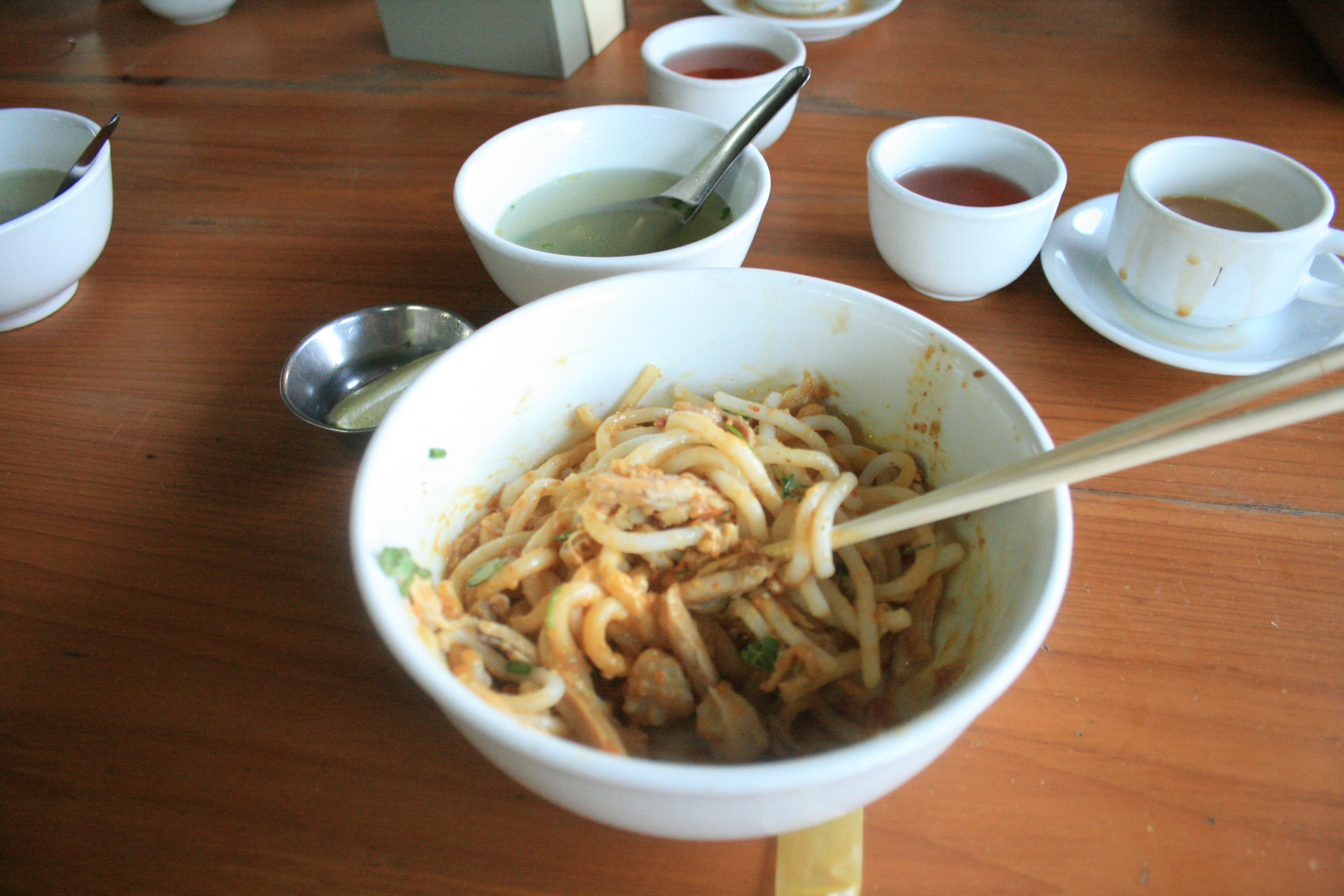
Mandalay Meeshay

Mandalay meeshay (Burmese: မန္တလေးမြီးရှေ‌), a more elaborate dish, uses medium rice noodles and has a thicker, oilier meat sauce. A thicker rice flour glop is added. It is dressed with fried peanut oil, salted fermented soybeans and chilli oil, then garnished with blanched bean sprouts, pickled daikon, fried batter, crushed garlic and coriander. As the name suggests, the dish is a regional variation from Mandalay, Myanmar's second largest city with a rich Shan cultural influence.

=== Myay-oh meeshay ===
Myay-oh meeshay (lit. 'claypot meeshay') is a Yunnanese inspired dish, in which the rice noodles are cooked in a clay pot. The dish has a greater quantity of soup and includes fresh vegetables.

== See also ==
- Crossing-the-bridge noodles
- Cuisine of Burma
- Mont di
- Nan gyi thohk
- Ohn no khao swe
- Shan-inspired Burmese dishes
