= Htamanè =

- Htamanè served on oiled banana leaves, traditionally eaten with plain tea
- Alternative names: Htamane, Htamanae
- Type: Seasonal snack
- Place of origin: Myanmar
- Serving temperature: Plain tea
- Main ingredients: Glutinous rice, sesame oil, ginger, peanuts, sesame seeds, shredded coconut, salt

Htamanè (Burmese: ထမနဲ, pronounced [tʰəmənɛ́]) is a seasonal Burmese snack made mainly from glutinous rice mixed with sesame seeds, peanuts, coconut, ginger and oil. It is traditionally prepared during Tabodwe, the eleventh month of the Burmese calendar, which falls around February.

Htamanè is usually cooked collectively by members of a community, and some communities hold htamane-making competitions. Once it is ready, a portion is offered to the Buddha and to monks, and the rest is shared with neighbours.

== Preparation ==
Glutinous rice is soaked in water overnight and washed the following day. Sesame oil is heated in a large iron pan over a wood fire, and sliced ginger is fried in it before the rice is added. Water is then poured in gradually while the mixture is pressed and stirred with long wooden paddles until the rice is cooked through and oil begins to seep out. Fried peanuts, roasted sesame seeds, shredded coconut and salt are then mixed in.

One traditional recipe, recorded in verse so that it could be memorised easily, uses about 4 pyi of glutinous rice, 1 viss of sesame oil, 3 ticals of ginger, 80 ticals of peanuts, 32 ticals of sesame seeds, 20 ticals of shredded coconut and 7 ticals of salt.

The preparation begins with washing and soaking white and purple (nga cheik) glutinous rice. In a giant wide wok on a low stove, the glutinous rice is kneaded, crushed and boiled with water and groundnut oil until it becomes a thick blackish grey paste. The wok is lowered from the stove onto a small wooden block to hold it. Once there, the mixing process which is the main feature of making Htamanè begins. Typically, three people (almost always stout men) are involved in the mixing process. Two men each with giant wooden spatulas resembling rowing paddles, begin to mix the glutinous dough while a third coordinates the two spatulas, often by holding on to them near the pot. Towards the end of the mixing process, toasted sesame seeds, peanuts, fried ginger, ground nut oil and fried coconut shavings are added to the wok. These ingredients become evenly mixed with the dough paste. Once a batch of htamanè has been prepared, more fried coconut shavings, peanuts and sesame seeds are added as garnishes.

== Community participation ==
Htamanè is usually made communally, with participants of all ages and both sexes. Because preparation takes several hours and requires a collective effort, many people are usually involved. Cooking generally takes place in an open space such as a pagoda platform, a temple courtyard or a monastery compound, and it may be sponsored by an individual or by a group. Equipment, including the iron pan, wooden paddles, baskets, trays and low round tables, is often hired from a monastery or from local households.

Tasks are traditionally divided by gender and age. Men carry out the heavier work, including transporting equipment, digging the fire pit, collecting firewood, water and coconuts, and securing the pan over the fire. Women and girls prepare most of the ingredients by washing the rice, slicing ginger, shelling peanuts and shredding coconut, while boys husk and open the coconuts. Women also fry the ginger and roast the peanuts and sesame seeds.

Once the rice softens, men press and stir it continuously with paddles, which requires considerable physical effort. The quality of the dish depends on both the proportions of rice, oil and water and how thoroughly the mixture is worked. After the pan is removed from the fire, the stirring continues while women gradually add the sesame seeds, peanuts and coconut.

Experienced participants taste the htamanè to judge whether it is ready. It is then shared out by age, beginning with the elderly and ending with children. It is served on banana leaves, collected by children and rubbed with oil, and eaten with hot plain tea.

== Competitions ==
Htamanè-making competitions are held at some pagodas and monasteries, including the Shwedagon Pagoda. Music troupes often perform during these contests, and a panel of judges tastes the entries to choose a winner, which may receive prizes of money or cloth. Winning teams sometimes lead a procession with music to a pagoda or monastery to offer their htamanè to Buddha images and monks. Schools and colleges also organise htamanè-making competitions as a way of teaching students about traditional practices and encouraging cooperation among them.

== Religious and cultural significance ==
Tabodwe, which falls around February, is the last month of the cold season in Myanmar. The Htamanè Festival, also known as the Glutinous Rice Festival, is held around the full moon day of Tabodwe, when communities gather to cook glutinous rice together. It is also regarded as a celebration of the new rice harvest. According to Khin Maung Nyunt, practitioners of traditional Burmese medicine recommend htamanè as a remedy for dry skin because of its oil content.

The first portion of the htamanè is offered at dawn to the Buddha and to monks, and the remainder is distributed among participants and neighbours. The event is associated with cooperation, generosity and merit-making. Htamanè feasts are open to everyone without invitation, including strangers, whatever their background, and guests may take some home wrapped in leaves.

== See also ==
- Burmese cuisine
- List of Burmese dishes
- Glutinous rice
- Tabodwe
- Burmese traditional festivals

== Preparation ==
Glutinous rice is soaked in water overnight and washed the following day. Sesame oil is heated in a large iron pan over a wood fire, and sliced ginger is fried in it before the rice is added. Water is then poured in gradually while the mixture is pressed and stirred with long wooden paddles until the rice is cooked through and oil begins to seep out. Fried peanuts, roasted sesame seeds, shredded coconut and salt are then mixed in.

One traditional recipe, recorded in verse so that it could be memorised easily, uses about 4 pyi of glutinous rice, 1 viss of sesame oil, 3 ticals of ginger, 80 ticals of peanuts, 32 ticals of sesame seeds, 20 ticals of shredded coconut and 7 ticals of salt.

The preparation begins with washing and soaking white and purple (nga cheik) glutinous rice. In a giant wide wok on a low stove, the glutinous rice is kneaded, crushed and boiled with water and groundnut oil until it becomes a thick blackish grey paste. The wok is lowered from the stove onto a small wooden block to hold it. Once there, the mixing process which is the main feature of making Htamanè begins. Typically, three people (almost always stout men) are involved in the mixing process. Two men each with giant wooden spatulas resembling rowing paddles, begin to mix the glutinous dough while a third coordinates the two spatulas, often by holding on to them near the pot. Towards the end of the mixing process, toasted sesame seeds, peanuts, fried ginger, ground nut oil and fried coconut shavings are added to the wok. These ingredients become evenly mixed with the dough paste. Once a batch of htamanè has been prepared, more fried coconut shavings, peanuts and sesame seeds are added as garnishes.

== Community participation ==
Htamanè is usually made communally, with participants of all ages and both sexes. Because preparation takes several hours and requires a collective effort, many people are usually involved. Cooking generally takes place in an open space such as a pagoda platform, a temple courtyard or a monastery compound, and it may be sponsored by an individual or by a group. Equipment, including the iron pan, wooden paddles, baskets, trays and low round tables, is often hired from a monastery or from local households.

Tasks are traditionally divided by gender and age. Men carry out the heavier work, including transporting equipment, digging the fire pit, collecting firewood, water and coconuts, and securing the pan over the fire. Women and girls prepare most of the ingredients by washing the rice, slicing ginger, shelling peanuts and shredding coconut, while boys husk and open the coconuts. Women also fry the ginger and roast the peanuts and sesame seeds.

Once the rice softens, men press and stir it continuously with paddles, which requires considerable physical effort. The quality of the dish depends on both the proportions of rice, oil and water and how thoroughly the mixture is worked. After the pan is removed from the fire, the stirring continues while women gradually add the sesame seeds, peanuts and coconut.

Experienced participants taste the htamanè to judge whether it is ready. It is then shared out by age, beginning with the elderly and ending with children. It is served on banana leaves, collected by children and rubbed with oil, and eaten with hot plain tea.

== Competitions ==
Htamanè-making competitions are held at some pagodas and monasteries, including the Shwedagon Pagoda. Music troupes often perform during these contests, and a panel of judges tastes the entries to choose a winner, which may receive prizes of money or cloth. Winning teams sometimes lead a procession with music to a pagoda or monastery to offer their htamanè to Buddha images and monks. Schools and colleges also organise htamanè-making competitions as a way of teaching students about traditional practices and encouraging cooperation among them.

== Religious and cultural significance ==
Tabodwe, which falls around February, is the last month of the cold season in Myanmar. The Htamanè Festival, also known as the Glutinous Rice Festival, is held around the full moon day of Tabodwe, when communities gather to cook glutinous rice together. It is also regarded as a celebration of the new rice harvest. According to Khin Maung Nyunt, practitioners of traditional Burmese medicine recommend htamanè as a remedy for dry skin because of its oil content.

The first portion of the htamanè is offered at dawn to the Buddha and to monks, and the remainder is distributed among participants and neighbours. The event is associated with cooperation, generosity and merit-making. Htamanè feasts are open to everyone without invitation, including strangers, whatever their background, and guests may take some home wrapped in leaves.

== See also ==
- Burmese cuisine
- List of Burmese dishes
- Glutinous rice
- Tabodwe
- Burmese traditional festivals
