= Ants climbing a tree =

Sichuan dish

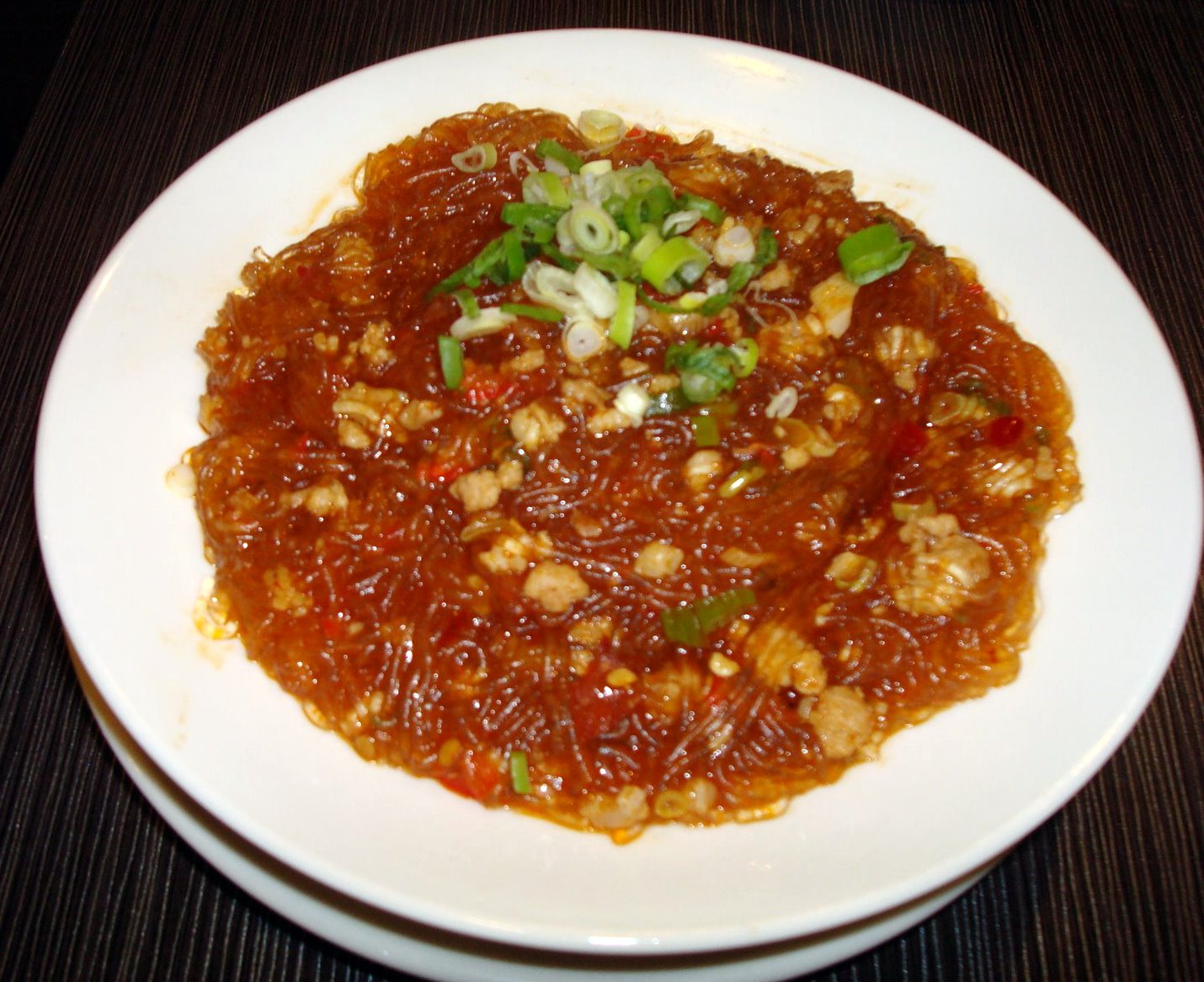
- Traditional Chinese: 螞蟻上樹
- Simplified Chinese: 蚂蚁上树
Transcriptions
Standard Mandarin
- Hanyu Pinyin: mǎyǐshàngshù
other Mandarin
- Sichuanese Pinyin: ma^{2} yi^{3} sang^{3} su^{3}

Ants climbing a tree (simplified Chinese: 蚂蚁上树; traditional Chinese: 螞蟻上樹; pinyin: mǎyǐshàngshù) is a classic Sichuan dish in Chinese cuisine. The name of the dish in Chinese, mayishangshu, has been translated as "ants climbing a tree", "ants on the tree", "ants creeping up a tree", "ants climbing a hill" or "ants climbing a log". It is so called because the dish has bits of ground meat clinging to noodles, evoking an image of ants walking on twigs. The dish consists of ground meat, such as pork, cooked in a sauce and poured over bean thread noodles. Other ingredients in the dish may include rice vinegar, soy sauce, vegetable oil, sesame oil, scallions, garlic, ginger, and chili paste.

To make the "ants", meat is marinated for a short time at room temperature while the noodles are soaked to soften. In a wok, oil is heated until almost smoking. The scallions, garlic, and ginger are cooked slightly in the wok before the marinated meat is added. The softened noodles are added to the wok to soak up the flavor and juices.

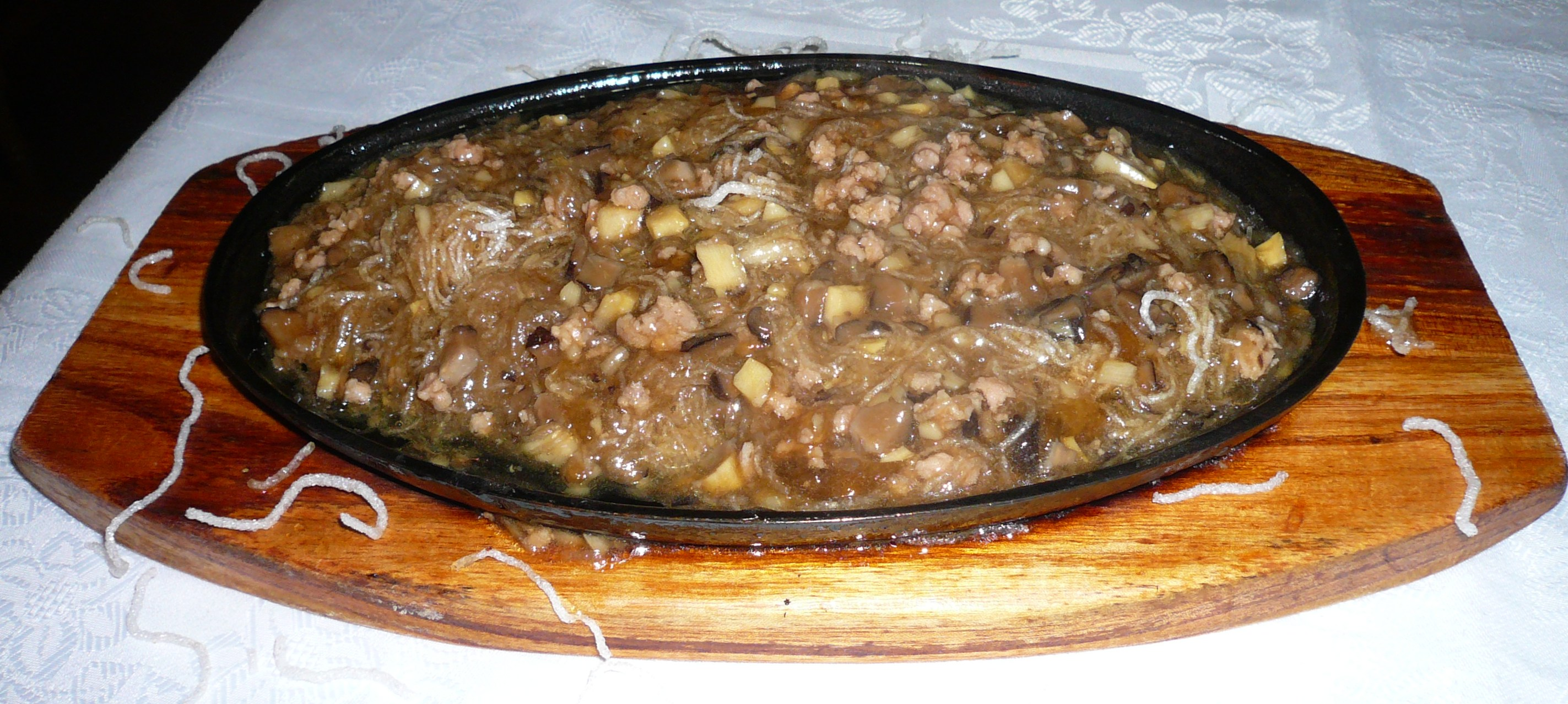
Ants climbing a tree

Dry noodles that have not yet been softened can also be fried in hot oil to add texture to the dish. The noodles will puff immediately and can be removed with a bamboo or stainless wire skimmer, then set on paper towels to drain before adding to the rest of the dish.
