= Glass noodles =

Transparent noodle made from starch

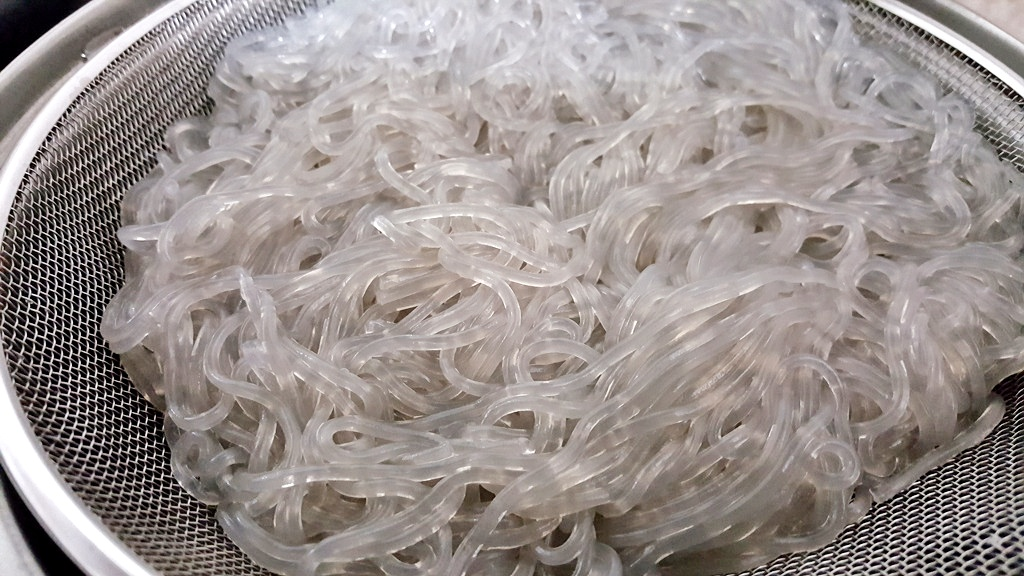
- Cooked glass noodles
- Alternative names: Cellophane noodles
- Type: Noodles
- Place of origin: China
- Region or state: East Asia, Southeast Asia
- Associated cuisine: Chinese, Indonesian, Japanese, Korean, Malaysian, Filipino, Samoan, Thai, Vietnamese, Burmese and Taiwanese
- Main ingredients: Starch (from mung beans, yams, potatoes, cassava, canna, or batata), water

Regional name

Chinese name
- Traditional Chinese: 粉絲/粉條
- Simplified Chinese: 粉丝/粉条
- Literal meaning: flour thread
- Hanyu Pinyin: fěnsī / fěntiáo
- Wade–Giles: fên^{3}-ssŭ^{1}
- Yale Romanization: fán sī
- Jyutping: fan^{2} si^{1}

Chinese name (Taiwan)
- Chinese: 冬粉
- Literal meaning: winter flour
- Hanyu Pinyin: dōngfěn
- Bopomofo: ㄉㄨㄥㄈㄣˇ
- Wade–Giles: tung^{1}-fên^{3}
- Hokkien POJ: tang-hún

Burmese name
- Burmese: ကြာဆံ

Vietnamese name
- Vietnamese alphabet: miến / bún tàu
- Hán-Nôm: 麪 / 𡅊艚
- Literal meaning: noodle / Chinese vermicelli

Thai name
- Thai: วุ้นเส้น / เส้นแกงร้อน / ตังหน
- RTGS: wun sen / sen kaeng ron / tung hon

Korean name
- Hangul: 당면
- Hanja: 唐麵
- Literal meaning: Tang noodle
- Revised Romanization: dangmyeon
- McCune–Reischauer: tangmyŏn

North Korean name
- Chosŏn'gŭl: 분탕
- Hancha: 粉湯
- Literal meaning: flour soup
- Revised Romanization: buntang
- McCune–Reischauer: punt'ang

Japanese name
- Kanji: 春雨
- Kana: はるさめ
- Revised Hepburn: harusame

Malay name
- Malay: suhun

Indonesian name
- Indonesian: sohun

Filipino name
- Tagalog: sotanghon

Glass noodles, or fensi (traditional Chinese: 粉絲; simplified Chinese: 粉丝; pinyin: fěnsī; lit. 'flour thread'), sometimes called cellophane noodles, are a type of transparent noodle made from starch (such as mung bean starch, potato starch, sweet potato starch, tapioca, or canna starch) and water. They originated in China. A stabilizer such as chitosan or alum (illegal in some jurisdictions) may also be used.

They are generally sold in dried form, soaked to reconstitute, then used in soups, stir-fried dishes, or spring rolls. They are called "glass noodles" because of their glass-like transparency when cooked. Glass noodles are not the same as rice vermicelli, which is made from rice and white in color rather than clear (after cooking in water).

== Varieties ==
Glass noodles are made from a variety of starches. In China, glass noodles are usually made of mung bean starch or sweet potato starch. Chinese varieties made from mung bean starch are called Chinese vermicelli, bean threads, or bean thread noodles. Chinese varieties made from sweet potato starch are called fentiao or hongshufen. Thicker Korean varieties made with sweet potato starch are called sweet potato noodles or dangmyeon.

Glass noodles are available in various thicknesses. Wide, flat glass noodle sheets called mung bean sheets are also produced in China. In Korea, napjak-dangmyeon (literally "flat dangmyeon") refers to flat sweet potato noodles.

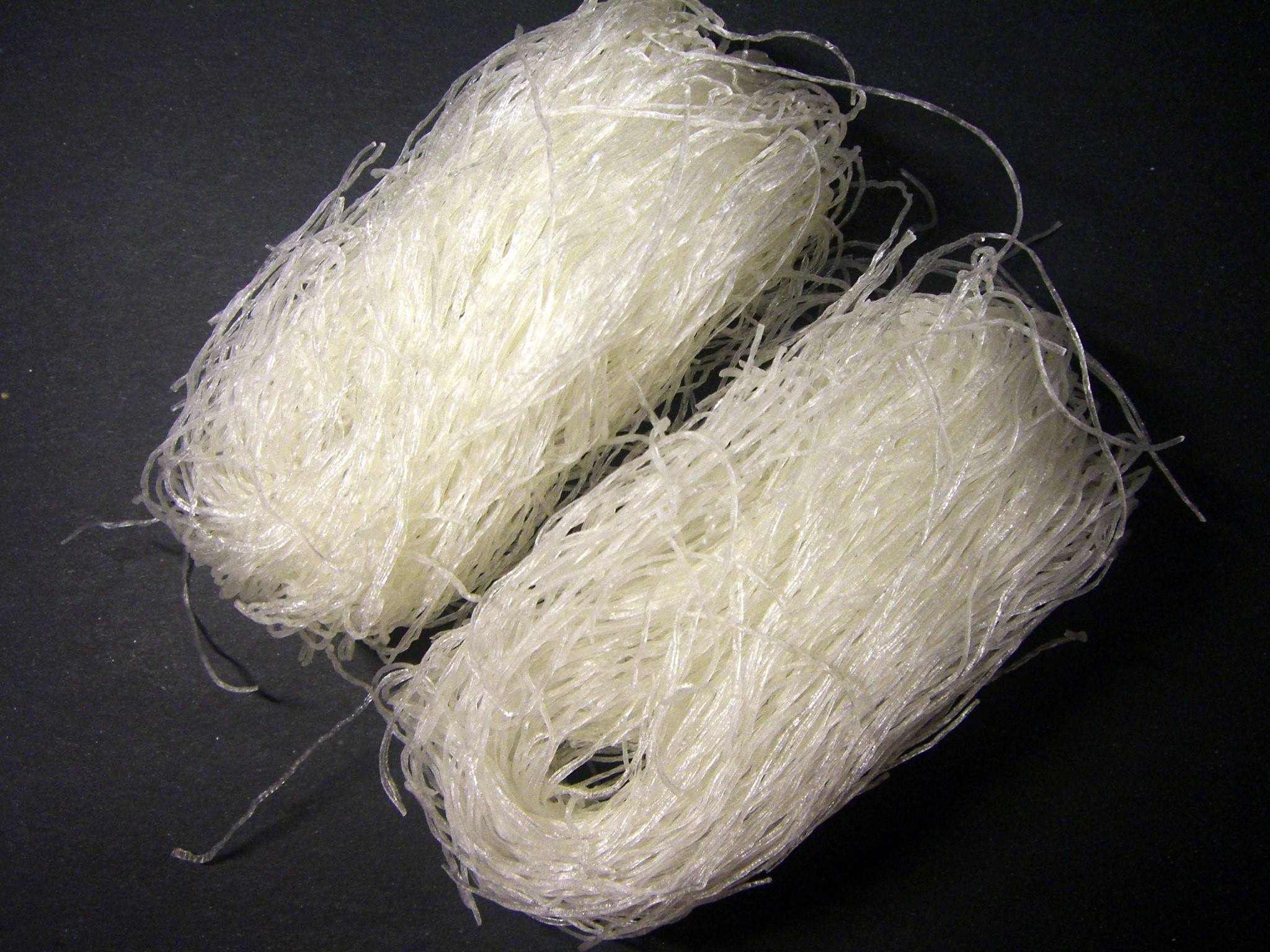
Dried Chinese vermicelli made with mung bean starch

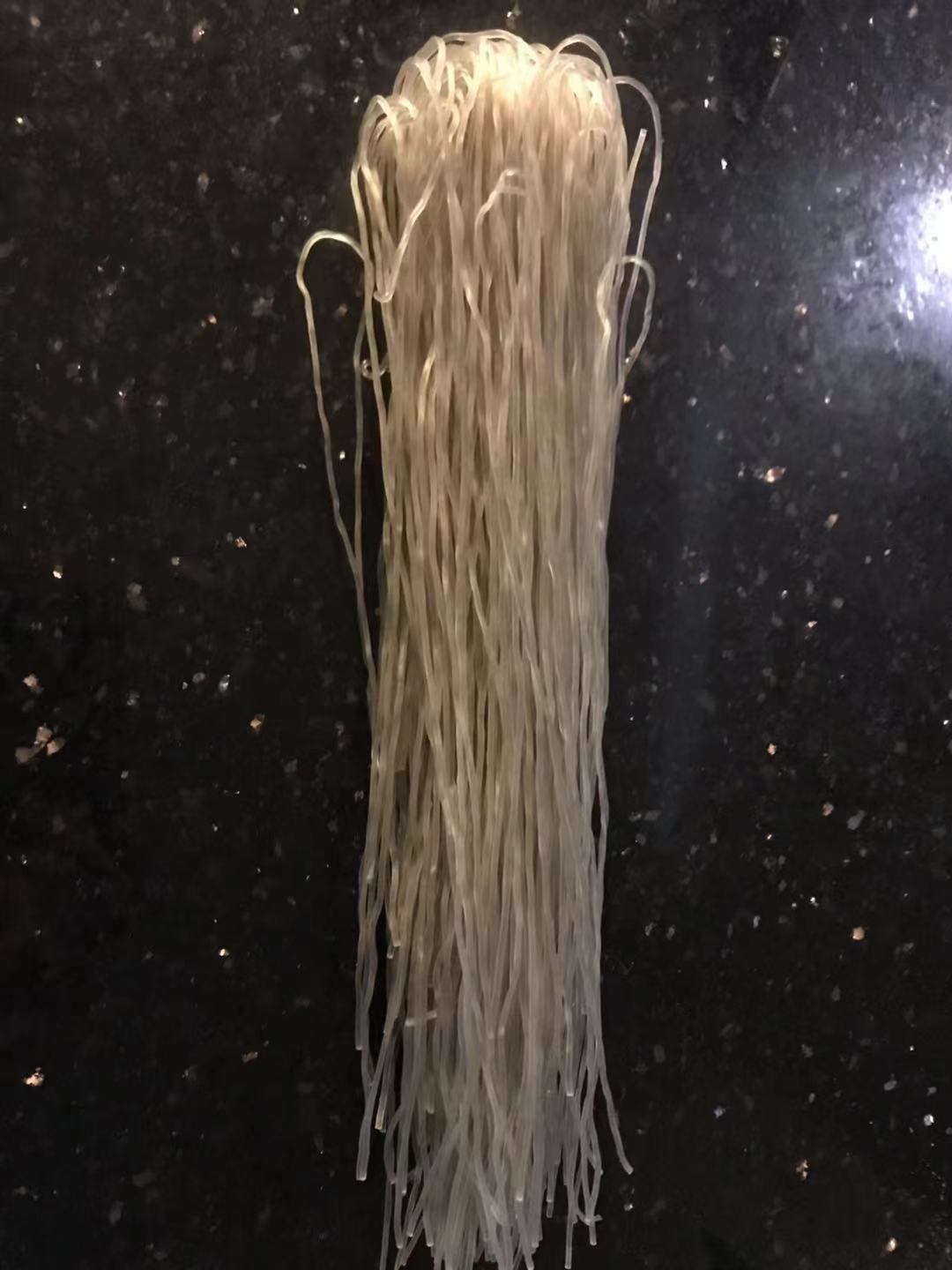
Dried Chinese fentiao or hongshufen made with sweet potato starch

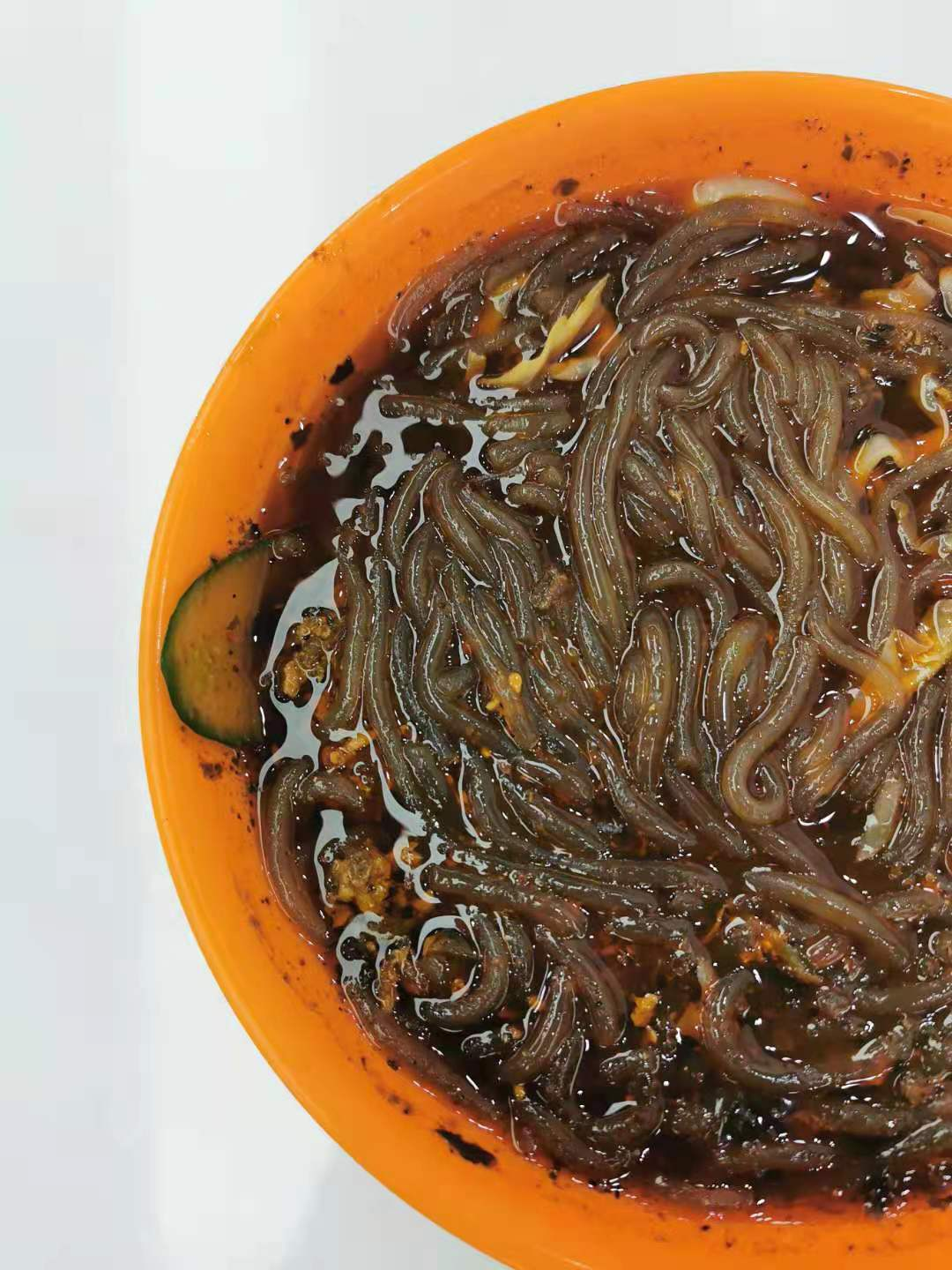
Sì chuān suān là fěn (hot and sour noodles) made with fensi or hongshufen

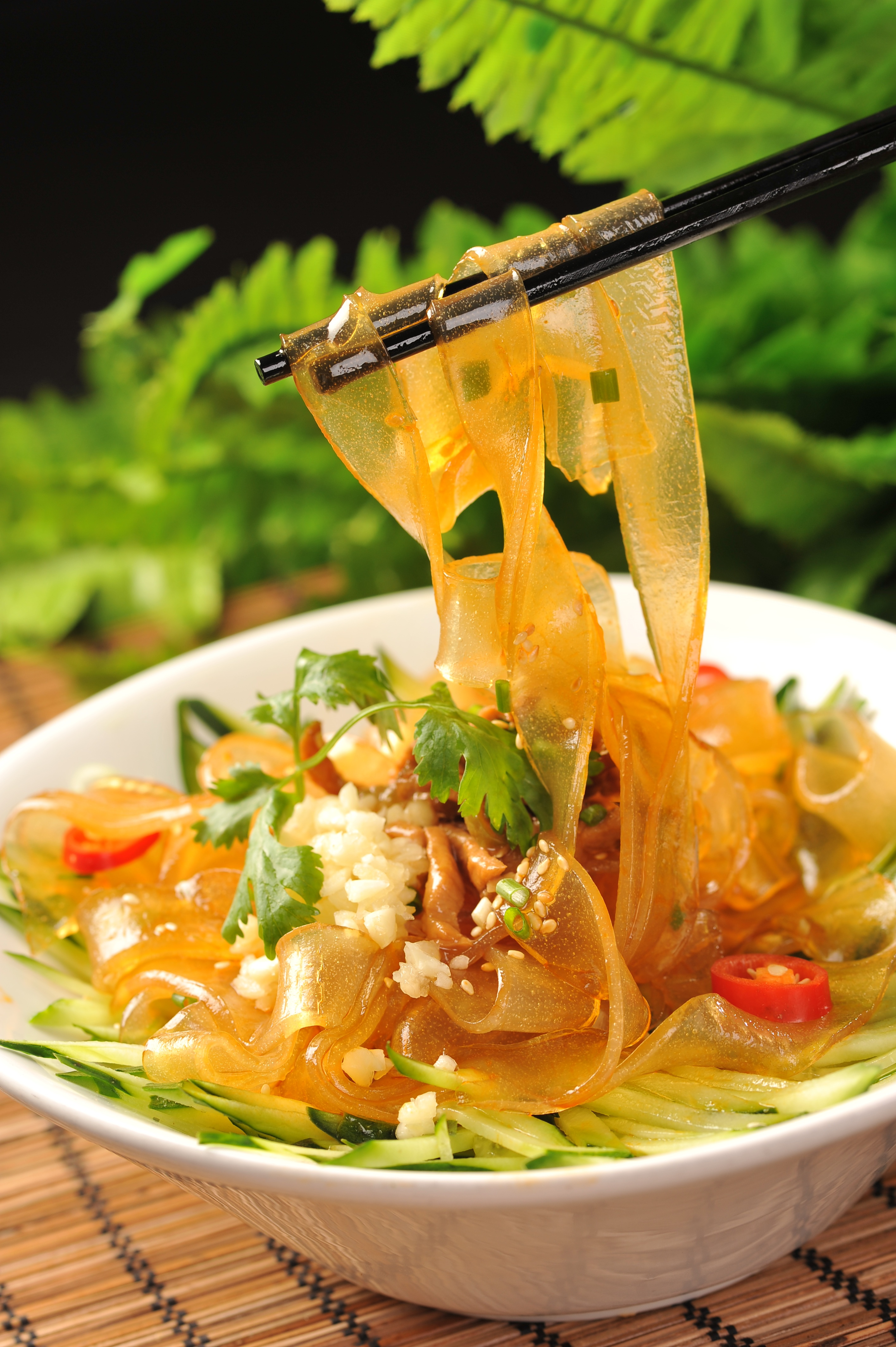
Dōng běi dà lā pí made with Chinese mung bean sheets

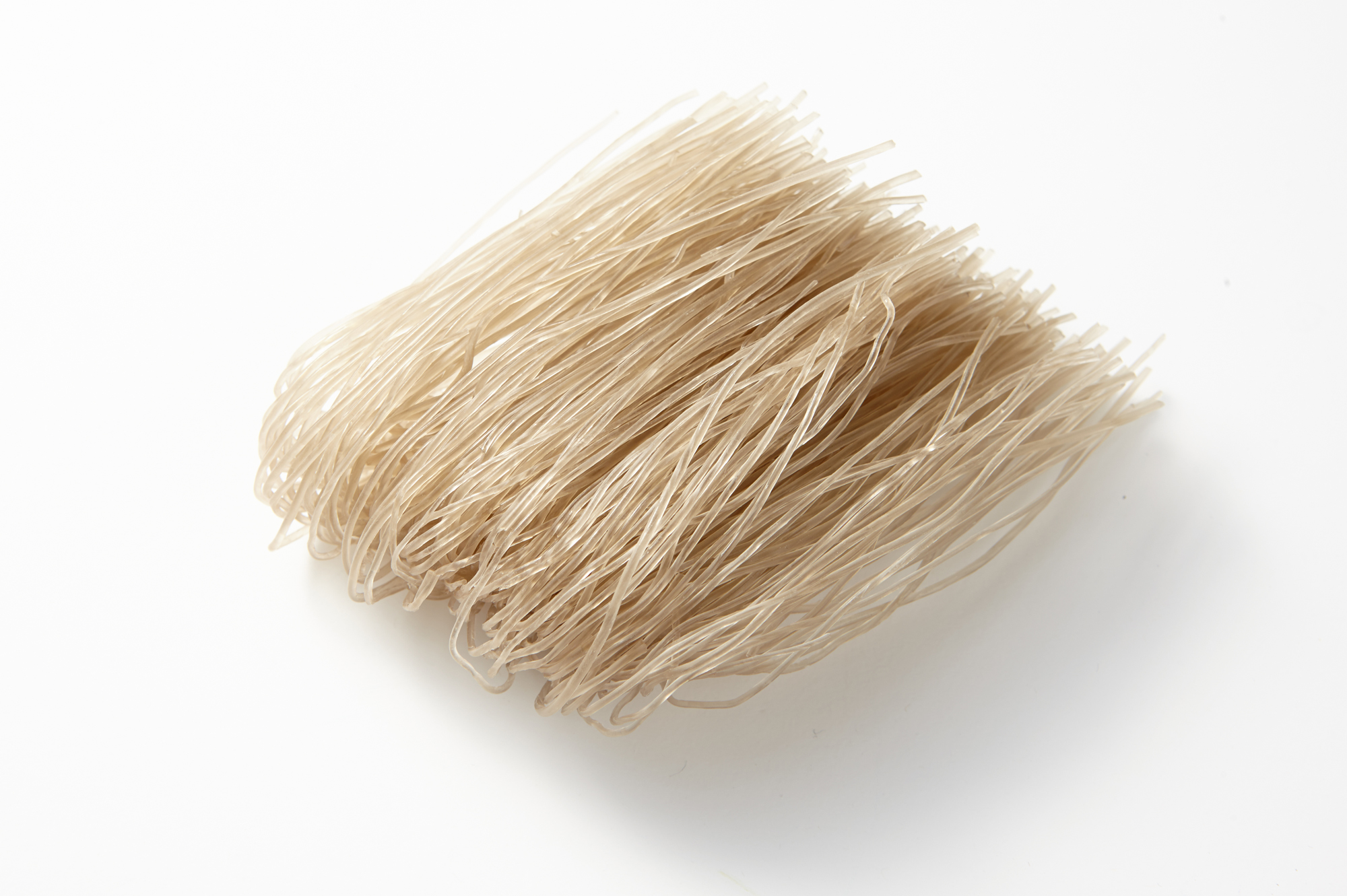
Dried Korean dangmyeon made with sweet potato starch

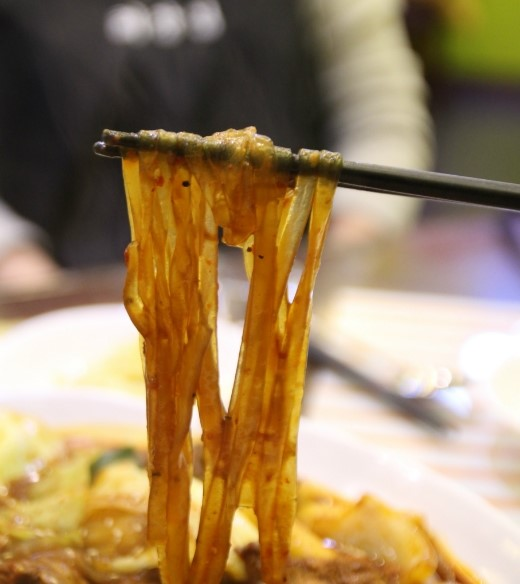
Napjak-dangmyeon in jjimdak

== Production ==
In China, the primary site of production of glass noodles is the town of Zhangxing, in Zhaoyuan, Shandong province. Historically the noodles were shipped through the port of Longkou, and thus the noodles are known and marketed as Longkou fensi (simplified Chinese: 龙口粉丝; traditional Chinese: 龍口粉絲).

== Use ==
=== East Asia ===
==== China ====
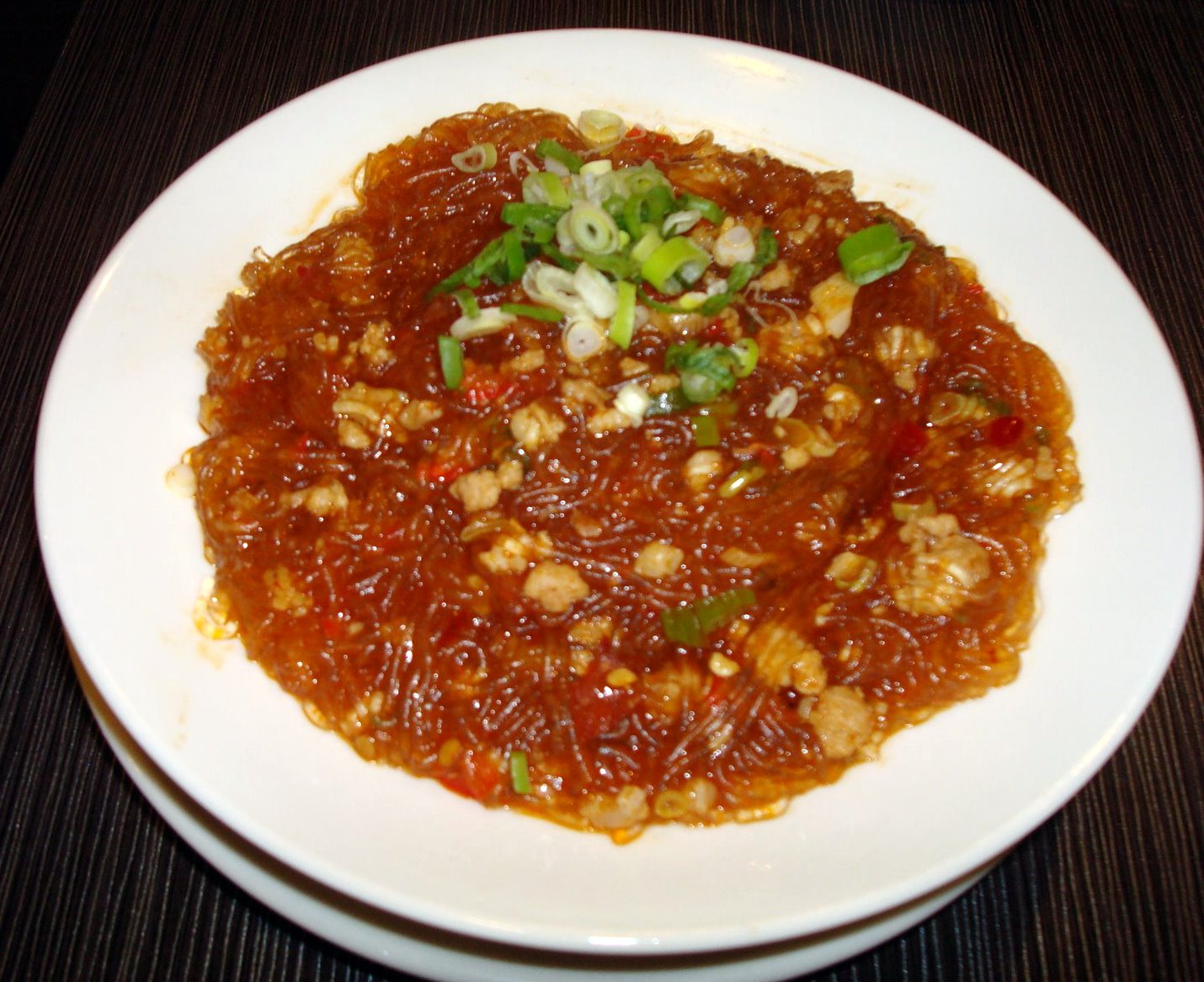
Ants climbing a tree (螞蟻上樹)

In Chinese, the most commonly used names are fěnsī (Chinese: 粉絲; lit. 'noodle thread') and fěntiáo or hóngshǔfěn (Chinese: 粉條 or Chinese: 紅薯粉; lit. 'noodle strip' or 'sweet potato noodles'). They are also marketed under the name saifun, the Cantonese pronunciation of the Mandarin xìfěn (Chinese: 細粉; lit. 'slender noodle', though the name fánsī (粉絲) is the term most often used in Cantonese.

In China, glass noodles are a popular ingredient used in stir-fries, soups, and particularly hot pots. They can also be used as an ingredient in fillings for a variety of Chinese jiaozi (dumplings) and bing (flatbreads), especially in vegetarian versions of these dishes. Thicker glass noodles are also commonly used to imitate the appearance and texture of shark's fin in vegetarian soups. Thicker varieties, most popular in China's northeast, are used in stir-fries as well as cold salad-like dishes. A popular Shanghai cuisine using the ingredient is fried tofu with thin noodles (Chinese: 油豆腐線粉湯; pinyin: yóu dòu fu-xiàn fěn tāng). A popular Sichuan dish called "ants climbing a tree" consists of stewed glass noodles with a spicy ground pork meat sauce.

In Tibetan cuisine, glass noodles are called phing or fing and are used in soup, in pork curry, or with mushrooms.

==== Japan ====
In Japanese cuisine, they are called harusame (春雨), literally "spring rain". Unlike Chinese glass noodles, they are usually made from potato starch. They are commonly used to make salads, or as an ingredient in hot pot dishes. They are also often used to make Japanese adaptations of Chinese and Korean dishes. Shirataki noodles are translucent, traditional Japanese noodles made from the konjac yam and sometimes tofu.

==== Korea ====
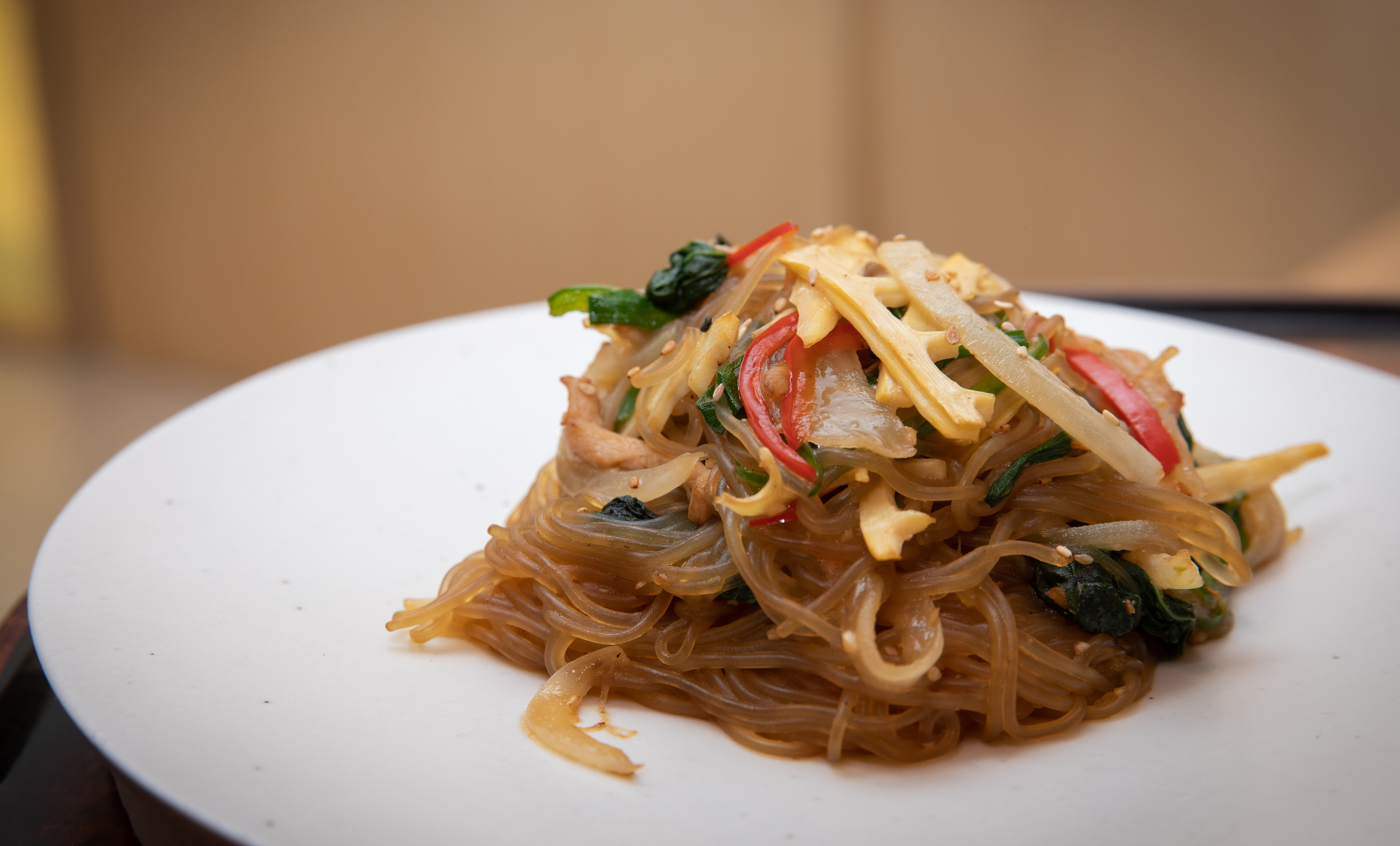
Japchae from Korea

In Korean cuisine, glass noodles are usually made from sweet potato starch and are called dangmyeon (Korean: 당면; Hanja: 唐麵; literally "Tang noodles"; also spelled dang myun, dangmyun, tang myun, or tangmyun). They are commonly stir-fried in sesame oil with beef and vegetables, and flavoured with soy and sugar, in a popular dish called japchae (잡채). They are usually thick, and are a brownish-gray color when in their uncooked form.

==== Taiwan ====
In Taiwanese cuisine, they are called dōngfěn (Chinese: 冬粉; lit. 'winter flour'). They are a versatile ingredient used in soups, stir-fries, hot pots, and street food.

A popular Taiwanese dish featuring glass noodles is bah-oân (肉圓), a translucent, doughy snack filled with meat and vegetables, often including glass noodles in the filling for added texture. Glass noodles are also a staple in Taiwanese-style lu wei (滷味), a braised food stall dish where various ingredients, including glass noodles, are simmered in a spiced soy-based broth and served hot or cold.

In Hakka cuisine, a traditional preparation called kè jīa fěn sī (客家粉絲) involves stir-frying glass noodles with dried shrimp, mushrooms, pork, and preserved vegetables. Glass noodles are also often included in festive banquet dishes, such as steamed seafood casseroles and Buddha Jumps Over the Wall (佛跳牆), where they absorb rich flavours from broths and other ingredients.

Taiwanese hot pots (火鍋) frequently include glass noodles as an essential add-in that soaks up the broth while maintaining a chewy texture, especially in spicy or medicinal broths popular in winter.

=== South Asia ===
==== India ====
In India, glass noodles are called falooda (see falooda, the dessert dish), and are served on top of kulfi (a traditional ice cream). They are usually made from arrowroot starch using a traditional technique. The noodles have minimal flavor so they provide a nice contrast with the sweet kulfi. Kulfi and falooda can be bought from numerous food stalls throughout northern and southern parts of India.

=== Southeast Asia ===
==== Indonesia ====
In Indonesian cuisine, they are called soun, suun, or sohun, probably from Pe̍h-ōe-jī: suànn-hún (traditional Chinese: 線粉; simplified Chinese: 线粉; pinyin: xiànfěn; lit. 'thread flour'). It is usually eaten with bakso, tekwan, and soto. In Klaten, there are sohun made from aren starch.

==== Malaysia ====
In Malaysia, they are known as tanghoon (冬粉). They are sometimes confused with bihun (米粉), which are rice vermicelli. They are sometimes also known as suhun or suhoon.

==== Myanmar (Burma) ====
In Myanmar, glass noodles are called kyazan (ကြာဆံ; lit. 'lotus thread'), more specifically pe kyazan (ပဲကြာဆံ, lit. 'bean lotus thread'), which is typically made with mung bean flour. The other form of kyazan, called hsan kyazan (ဆန်ကြာဆံ), refers to rice vermicelli.

Kyazan is the primary starch used in a Burmese consommé called kya zan hinga, and is also used in Burmese salads.

==== Philippines ====
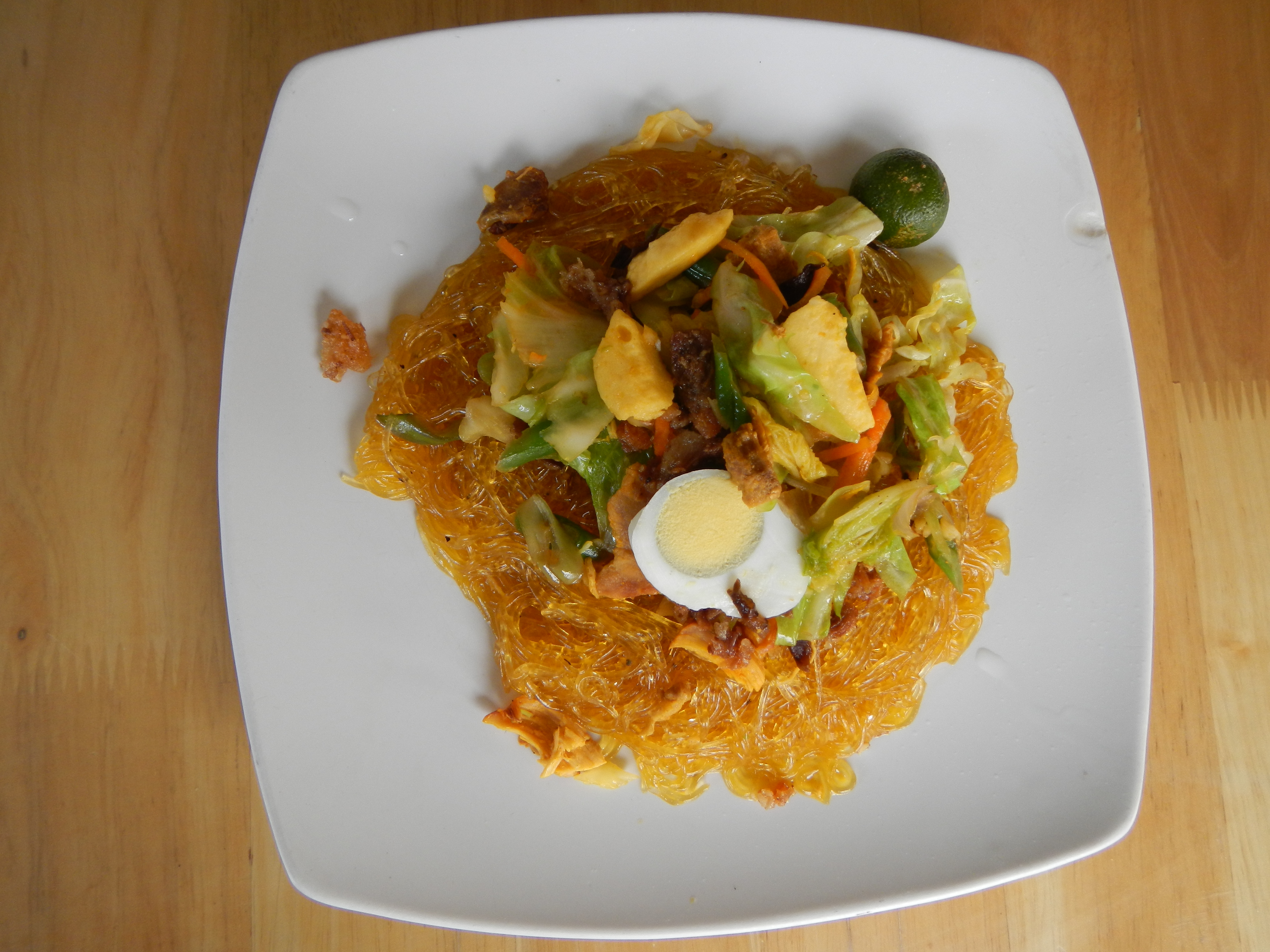
Pancit Sotanghon (Lin-Mers, Baliuag, Bulacan, Philippines)

In Filipino cuisine, the noodles are called a similar name: sotanghon because of the popular dish of the same name made from them using chicken and wood ears. They are also confused with rice vermicelli, which is called bihon in the Philippines.

==== Thailand ====
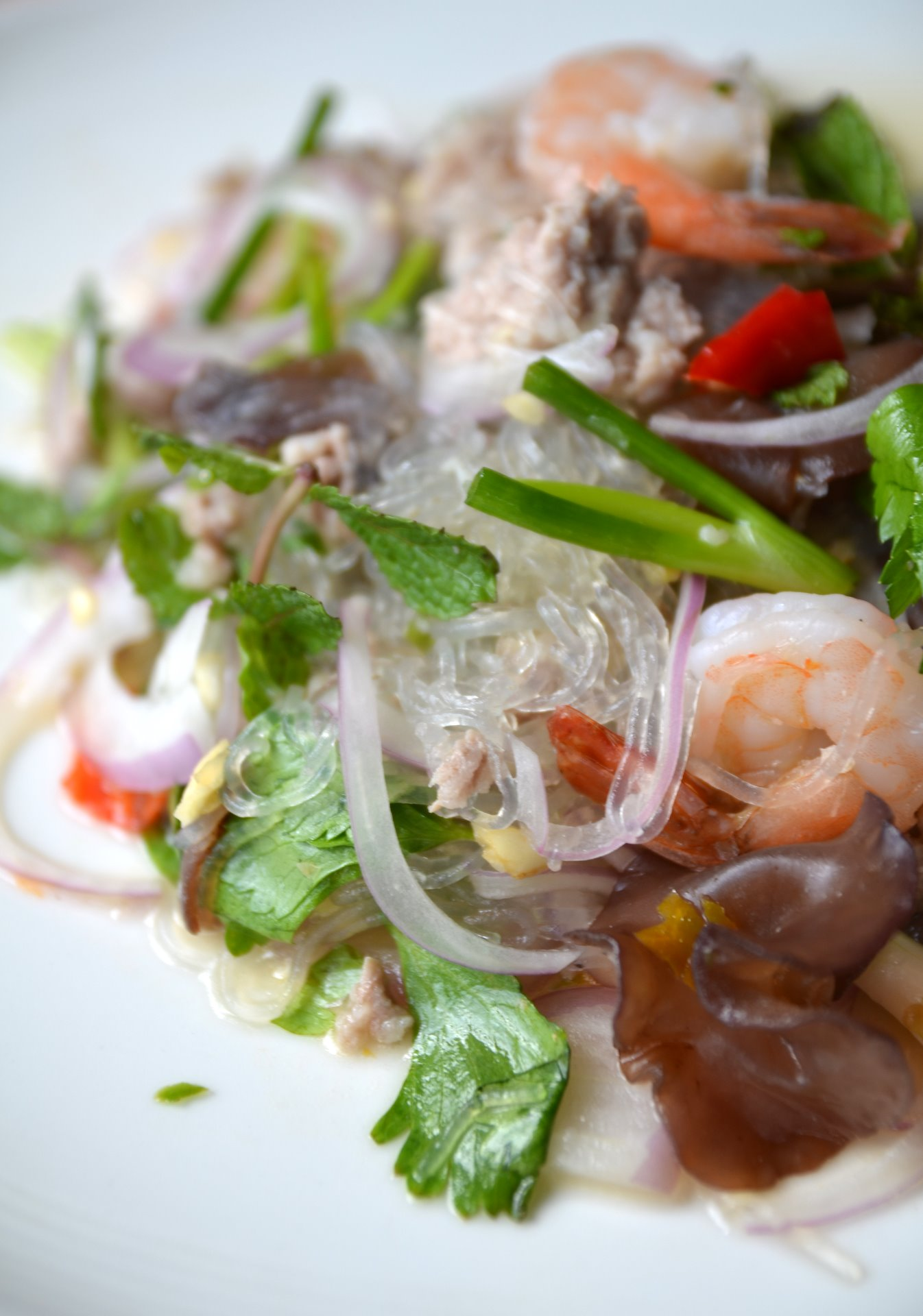
Yam wun sen kung: A Thai salad made with glass hane noodles and shrimp

In Thai cuisine, glass noodles are called wun sen (Thai: วุ้นเส้น). They are commonly mixed with pork and shrimp in a spicy salad called yam wun sen (Thai: ยำวุ้นเส้น), or stir-fried as phat wun sen (Thai: ผัดวุ้นเส้น) and sometimes used as the noodles for pad thai.

==== Vietnam ====
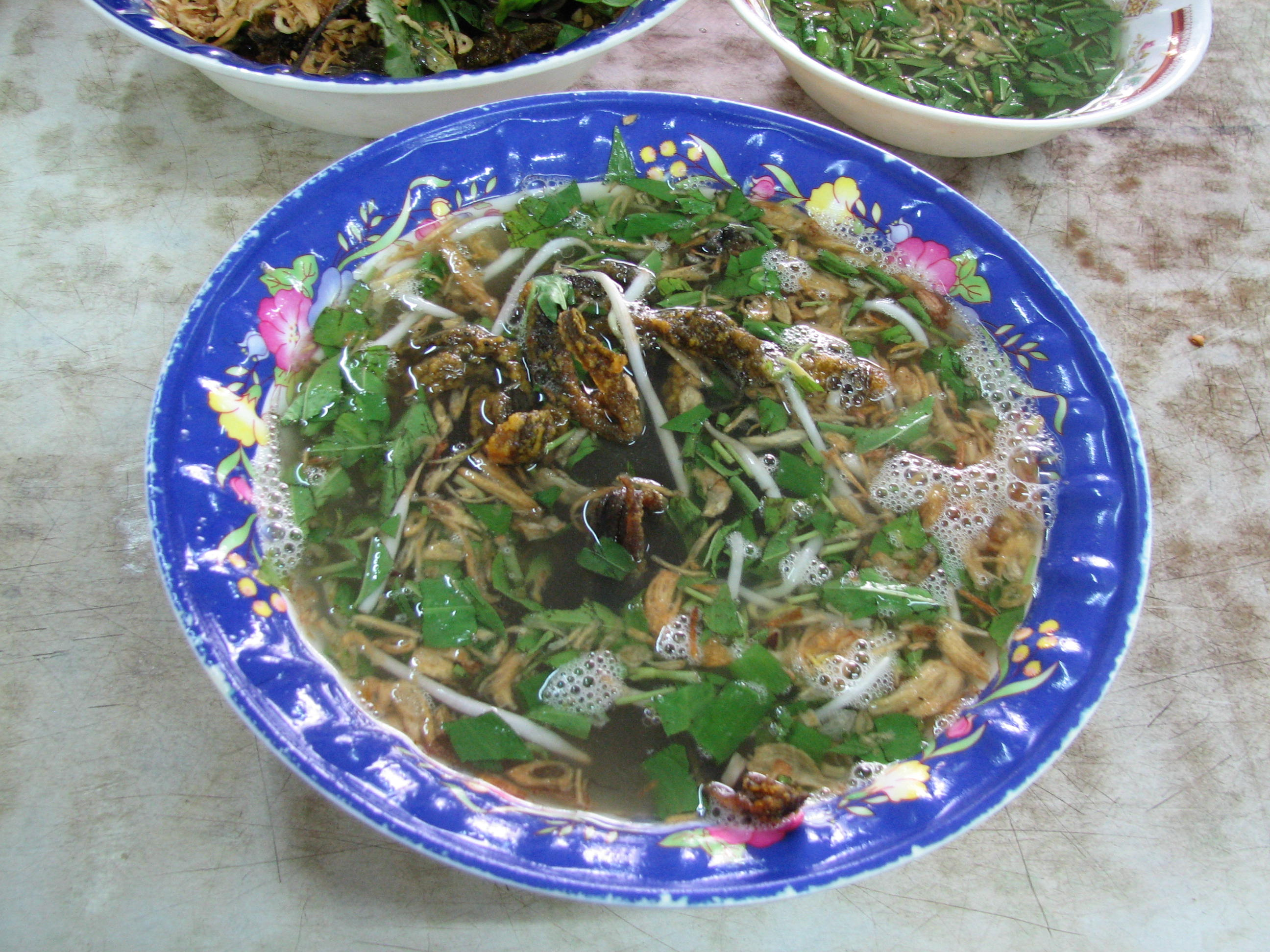
Miến lươn (eel noodle soup) in Hanoi, Vietnam

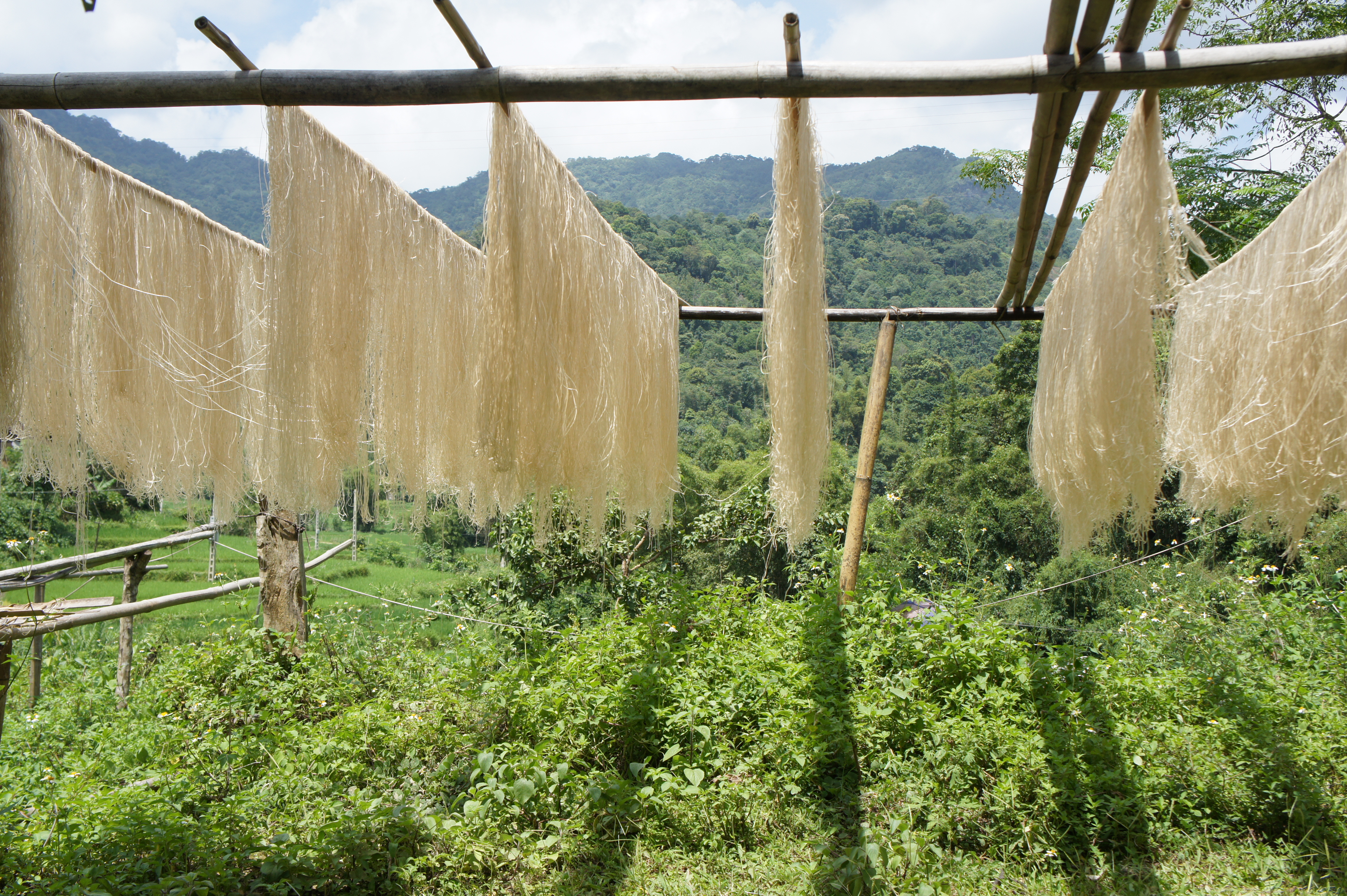
Miến production in the north of Vietnam

In Vietnamese cuisine, there are two varieties of glass noodles. The first, called bún tàu or bún tào, are made from mung bean starch, and were introduced by Chinese immigrants. The second, called miến or miến dong, are made from canna (Vietnamese: dong riềng), and were developed in Vietnam. These glass noodles are a main ingredient in the dishes: miến gà (chicken), miến lươn (eel), miến ngan (muscovy duck), and miến cua (crab). These glass noodles are sometimes confused with rice vermicelli (Vietnamese: bún) and arrowroot starch noodles (Vietnamese: arrowroot: củ dong, arrowroot starch: bột dong/bột hoàng tinh/tinh bột khoai mì).

=== Polynesia ===
==== French Polynesia ====
In French Polynesia, glass noodles are known as vermicelle de soja and were introduced to the islands by Hakka agricultural workers during the 19th century. They are most often used in maʻa tinito, a dish made with glass noodles mixed together with pork, beans, and cooked vegetables.

==== Hawaii ====
In Hawaii, where cuisine is heavily influenced by Asian cultures, glass noodles are known locally as long rice, supposedly because the process of making the noodles involves extruding the starch through a potato ricer. They are used most often in chicken long rice, a dish of glass noodles in chicken broth that is often served at luaus.

==== Samoa ====
Glass noodles were introduced to Samoa by Cantonese agricultural workers in the early 1900s, where they became known as "lialia" (from Samoan: liaʻi meaning "to twirl" as in the method of twirling the noodles around chopsticks when eating). A popular dish called sapasui (transliteration of the Cantonese 雜碎 zaap soei) is common fare at social gatherings. Sapasui, a soupy dish of boiled glass noodles mixed with braised pork, beef, or chicken, and chopped vegetables, is akin to Hawaiian "long rice".

== Food safety incidents ==
There were several food safety incidents originating in China. In 2004, a number of companies in Yantai, China, were found to be producing Longkou glass noodles with cornstarch instead of green beans, to reduce costs. In order to make the cornstarch transparent, they were adding sodium formaldehyde sulfoxylate and lead-based whiteners to their noodles.

In December 2010, Czech food inspection authorities inspecting Chinese glass noodles determined that 142 mg/kg (0.00227 oz/lb) of aluminium had been added to them. Above 10 mg/kg (0.00016 oz/lb) is an illegal amount for noodles in Czech and EU markets (see Annex I to Regulation (EC) No 669/2009 and its amendments (EU) No 187/2011, 618/2013 annex I).

== See also ==
- List of noodles
- Kelp noodles – another type of transparent noodles
- Khanom chin – a kind of thin rice noodles
- Vermicelli – thin wheat pasta or other thin noodles
