= Kya zan hinga =

Burmese Noodle soup

Kyazan hinga
- Alternative names: Kyazan chet
- Place of origin: Burma
- Associated cuisine: Burmese cuisine
- Main ingredients: glass noodle; mushrooms; bean curd skin; daylily buds; shrimp; fish balls
- Ingredients generally used: garlic; pepper

Kya zan hinga (Burmese: ကြာဆံဟင်းခါး; lit. 'lotus thread soup'), also known as kyazan chet (ကြာဆံချက်), is a dish of glass noodles in chicken consommé in Burmese cuisine. It is made with mushrooms, bean curd skin, dried daylily buds, shrimp, garlic, pepper and sometimes fish balls. For the addition of texture and flavour, it can be garnished with coriander, sliced shallots, fish sauce, chilli powder and a squeeze of lime.

== See also ==
- Noodle soup
