= Sinosphere =

Areas historically influenced by Chinese culture

- The Sinosphere is composed of Greater China, Korea, Japan, and Vietnam.

Chinese name
- Traditional Chinese: 東亞文化圈; 漢字文化圈
- Simplified Chinese: 东亚文化圈; 汉字文化圈
- Literal meaning: East Asian cultural sphere; Chinese character cultural sphere
Transcriptions
Standard Mandarin
- Hanyu Pinyin: Dōngyà wénhuà quān; Hànzì wénhuà quān
- Bopomofo: ㄉㄨㄥ ㄧㄚˋ ㄨㄣˊ ㄏㄨㄚˋ ㄑㄩㄢ; ㄏㄢˋ ㄗˋ ㄨㄣˊ ㄏㄨㄚˋ ㄑㄩㄢ
- IPA: [tʊ́ŋ.jâ wə̌n.xwâ tɕʰɥɛ́n]; [xân.tsɹ̩̂ wə̌n.xwâ tɕʰɥɛ́n]
Wu
- Romanization: ton-ia ven-ho-chioe; hoe-zr ven-ho-chioe
Hakka
- Pha̍k-fa-sṳ: Tûng-â vùn-fa-khiên; Hon-sṳ vùn-fa-khiên
Yue: Cantonese
- Jyutping: Dung1aa3 man4faa3hyun1; Hon3zi6 man4faa3hyun1
- IPA: [tʊŋ˥.a˧ mɐn˩.fa˧.hyn˥]|[hɔn˧.tsi˨ mɐn˩.fa˧.hyn˥]
Southern Min
- Hokkien POJ: Tang-a bûn-hòa-khoan; Hàn-jī bûn-hòa-khoan
- Tâi-lô: Tang-a bûn-huà-khua; Hàn-jī bûn-huà-khuan
Eastern Min
- Fuzhou BUC: Dĕ̤ng Ā ùng-huá-kuŏng; Háng-cê ùng-huá-kuŏng

Vietnamese name
- Vietnamese alphabet: Vùng văn hóa Á Đông; Vùng văn hóa Đông Á; Vùng văn hóa chữ Hán
- Chữ Nôm: 塳文化亞東; 塳文化東亞; 塳文化𡨸漢

Korean name
- Hangul: 동아문화권; 한자문화권
- Hanja: 東亞文化圈; 漢字文化圈
Transcriptions
- Revised Romanization: Dong-a Munhwagwon; Hanja Munhwagwon
- McCune–Reischauer: Tong'a Munhwakwŏn; Hancha Munhwakwŏn

Japanese name
- Kanji: 東亜文化圏; 漢字文化圏
Transcriptions
- Revised Hepburn: tō-a bunkaken; kanji bunkaken
- Kunrei-shiki: Tou-A Bunkaken; Kanzi Bunkaken

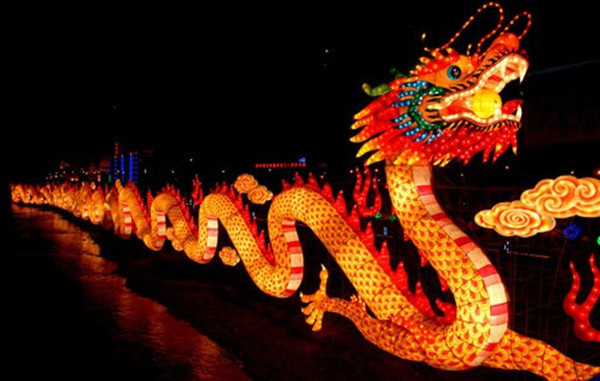
Chinese dragons, legendary creatures in Sinosphere mythology and culture

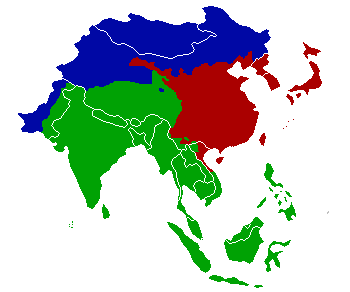
A map of the families of writing systems in East Asia, Southeast Asia, and South Asia. Red: Chinese characters; Green: Brahmi script; Blue: Aramaic (Mongolian script, Manchu alphabet, Old Uyghur alphabet, and Arabic script).

Map of the Sinosphere nations in the 11th century (Song dynasty, Đại Việt, Goryeo, and Heian-era Japan)

The Sinosphere, also known as the Chinese cultural sphere, East Asian cultural sphere, or the Sinic world, encompasses multiple countries in East Asia and Southeast Asia that were historically heavily influenced by Chinese culture. The Sinosphere comprises Greater China, Japan, Korea, and Vietnam. Historically, it also included the Ryukyu Kingdom. Singapore and Malaysia might also be included due to modern-era overseas Chinese migration. The Sinosphere is different from the Sinophone world, which indicates regions where the Chinese language is spoken.

Imperial China was a major regional power in Eastern Asia and exerted influence on tributary states and neighboring states, including Japan, Korea and Vietnam. (Note: Vietnam and Korea remained tributary states of China for much of their histories, while Japan only submitted fully to Chinese regional hegemony during the Muromachi period.) These interactions brought ideological and cultural influences rooted in Confucianism, Taoism and East Asian Buddhism. The four cultures were ruled by their respective emperors under similar administrative systems, furthermore, the adoption of the Confucian-based imperial examination system deeply influenced the bureaucracy and social structure of Korea and Vietnam. Chinese inventions influenced, and were in turn influenced by, innovations of the other cultures in governance, philosophy, science, and the arts. Literary Chinese became the written lingua franca for bureaucracy and communications, and Chinese characters became locally adapted as kanji in Japan, hanja in Korea, and chữ Hán in Vietnam.

The literary importance of classical Chinese was moderated as Japan, Korea and Vietnam invented their own phonographic writing systems, with Japan developing the katakana and hiragana scripts, Korea creating the hangul, and Vietnam initially developing chữ Nôm but replacing it with Latin-based Vietnamese alphabet since the 1910s due to French colonization. However Classical Chinese or modified versions of it such as kanbun and the Idu script remained in official use until the modern era. In the 21st century, ideological and cultural influences of Taoism, Confucianism, and Buddhism remain visible in high culture and social doctrines.

== Terminology ==
Ancient China was one of the cradles of civilization, with the emergent cultures that arose from the migration of Han settlers from the Yellow River generally regarded as the origin of the East Asian world.

Japanese historian Nishijima Sadao (1919–1998), professor emeritus at the University of Tokyo, coined the term Tōa bunka-ken (東亜文化圏, 'East Asian Cultural Sphere') to refer to an East Asian cultural sphere distinct from the cultures of the West. According to Nishijima, this cultural sphere—which includes China, Japan, Korea, and Vietnam—shared the philosophy of Confucianism, the religion of Buddhism, and similar political and social structures stemming from a background of historical Classical Chinese scholars. It has also been informally referred to as the "chopsticks sphere" due to perceived native use of these utensils across the region.

=== Etymology ===
The term Sinosphere is derived from Sino- 'China' (cf. Sinophone) + -sphere, in the sense of the sphere of influence under the influence of a country.

The CJK languages—Chinese, Japanese, Korean—each use cognate terms to translate English sphere:

- Chinese quān (Chinese: 圈; 'circle', 'ring', 'pen')
- Japanese ken (圏、けん; 'sphere', 'circle', 'range', 'radius')
- Korean gwon (권; from 圏)

Unlike with the other languages of the Sinosphere, the corresponding Vietnamese cognate khuyên 圈 is not used to mean 'sphere' or 'area'. (Note: In Vietnamese, khuyên (圈) has the meaning of 'earring'. The sense of the word as meaning 'sphere' is only found in Literary Chinese texts.) Instead, vùng ('region', 'area') is used. The Chinese 東亞文化圈 is translated in Vietnamese as Vùng văn hóa Á Đông (塳文化亞東).

In the Ryukyuan languages, 圏 (ちん; chin) is not used to mean 'sphere', 'area', or 'domain' and only appears in kammun texts written by Ryukyuans. Instead, 世 (yu) is used to mean 'world' or 'sphere'. As such, Chinese: 漢字文化圏 and Chinese: 東亜文化圏 would be translated as kanjii tiigata nu yu (漢字一型ぬ世) and too-a tiigata nu yu (東亜一型ぬ世), respectively.

Victor H. Mair discussed the origins of these 'culture sphere' terms. The Chinese wénhuà quān (Chinese: 文化圈) dates to a 1941 translation for the German term Kulturkreis, ('culture circle, field'), which the Austrian ethnologists Fritz Graebner and Wilhelm Schmidt proposed. Japanese historian Nishijima Sadao coined the expressions Kanji bunka ken (漢字文化圏; 'Chinese-character culture sphere') and Chuka bunka ken (中華文化圏; 'Chinese culture sphere'), which China later re-borrowed as loanwords. The Sinosphere may be taken to be synonymous to Ancient China and its descendant civilizations as well as the "Far Eastern civilizations" (the Mainland and the Japanese ones). In Toynbee's A Study of History (1934–1961), the Sinosphere is presented as among the major "units of study", along with the Western, Islamic, Eastern Orthodox, and Indic civilizations.

=== Comparisons with the West ===
British historian Arnold J. Toynbee lists the Far Eastern civilization as one of the main civilizations outlined in his book A Study of History. He proposes that the initial "Sinic civilization" originating in the Yellow River basin gradually grew into the subsequent "Far Eastern civilization", which extended to the Yangzi region and into Korea and Japan. Commonalities within the Far Eastern civilization were the result of developing from a "Sinic universal state". Toynbee contrasts this "affiliation" relationship between the Sinic and Far Eastern civilizations with the "apparentation-affiliation" relationship between the Hellenic and Western civilizations.

American sinologist and historian Edwin O. Reischauer also groups China, Japan, Korea, and Vietnam into a cultural sphere that he calls the "Sinic world", a group of centralized states that share a Confucian ethical philosophy. Reischauer states that this culture originated in northern China, and compares the relationship between northern China and East Asia to that of Greco-Roman civilization and Europe. The elites of East Asia were tied together through a common written language based on Chinese characters, much in the way that Latin functioned in Europe.

In his book The Clash of Civilizations, American political scientist Samuel P. Huntington considers the Sinic world as one of the modern (post–Cold War) civilizations. He notes that "all scholars recognize the existence of either a single distinct Chinese civilization dating back to at least 1500 B.C. and perhaps a thousand years earlier, or of two Chinese civilizations, one succeeding the other, in the early centuries of the Christian epoch". Huntington's Sinic civilization includes China, North Korea, South Korea, Vietnam, and Chinese communities in Southeast Asia. Of the many civilizations that Huntington discusses, the Sinic world is the only one that is based on a cultural, rather than religious, identity. Huntington theorizes that in a post–Cold War world, humanity "[identifies] with cultural groups: tribes, ethnic groups, religious communities [and] at the broadest level, civilizations". One exception is Japan, which Huntington considers as a distinct civilization.

== Culture ==
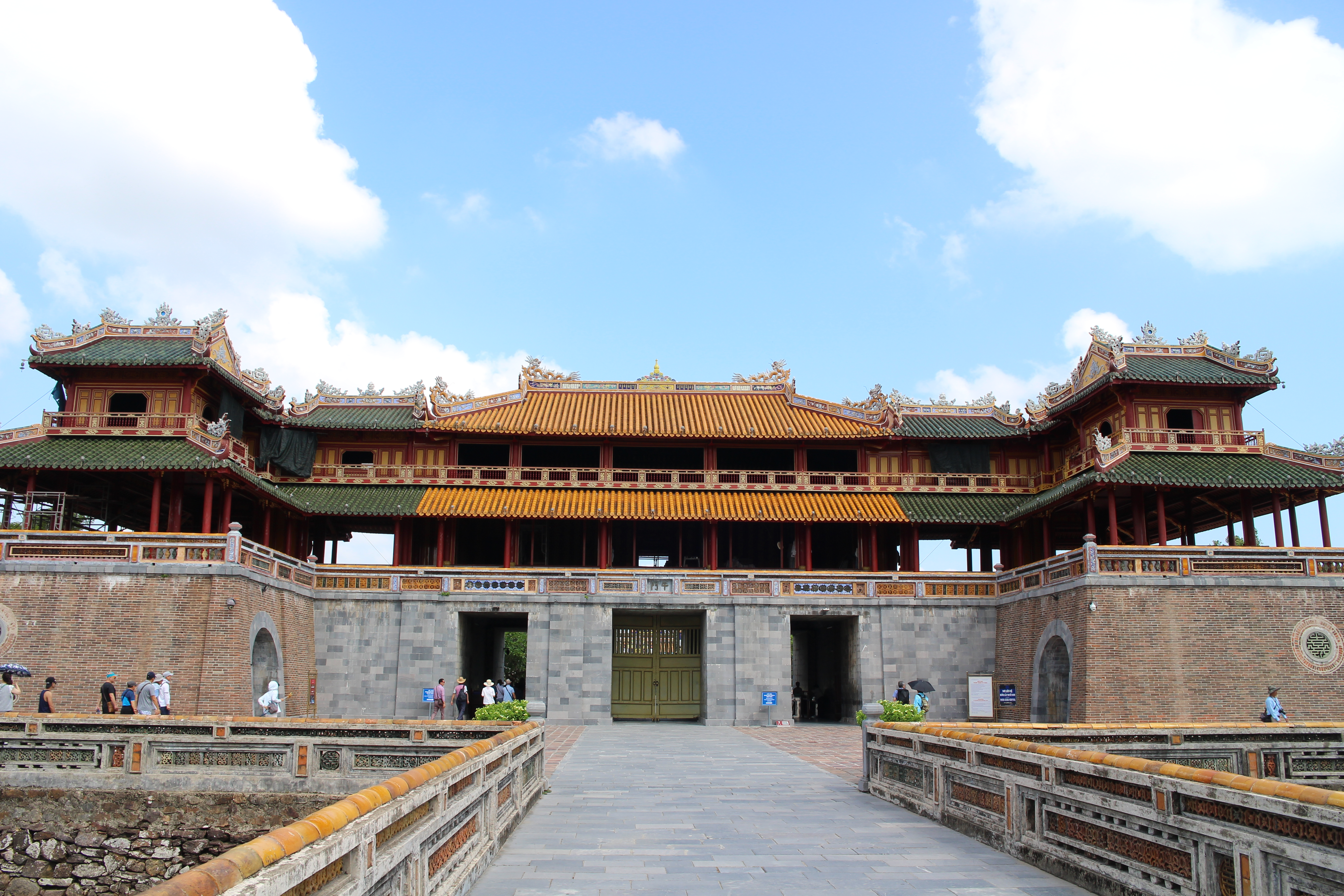
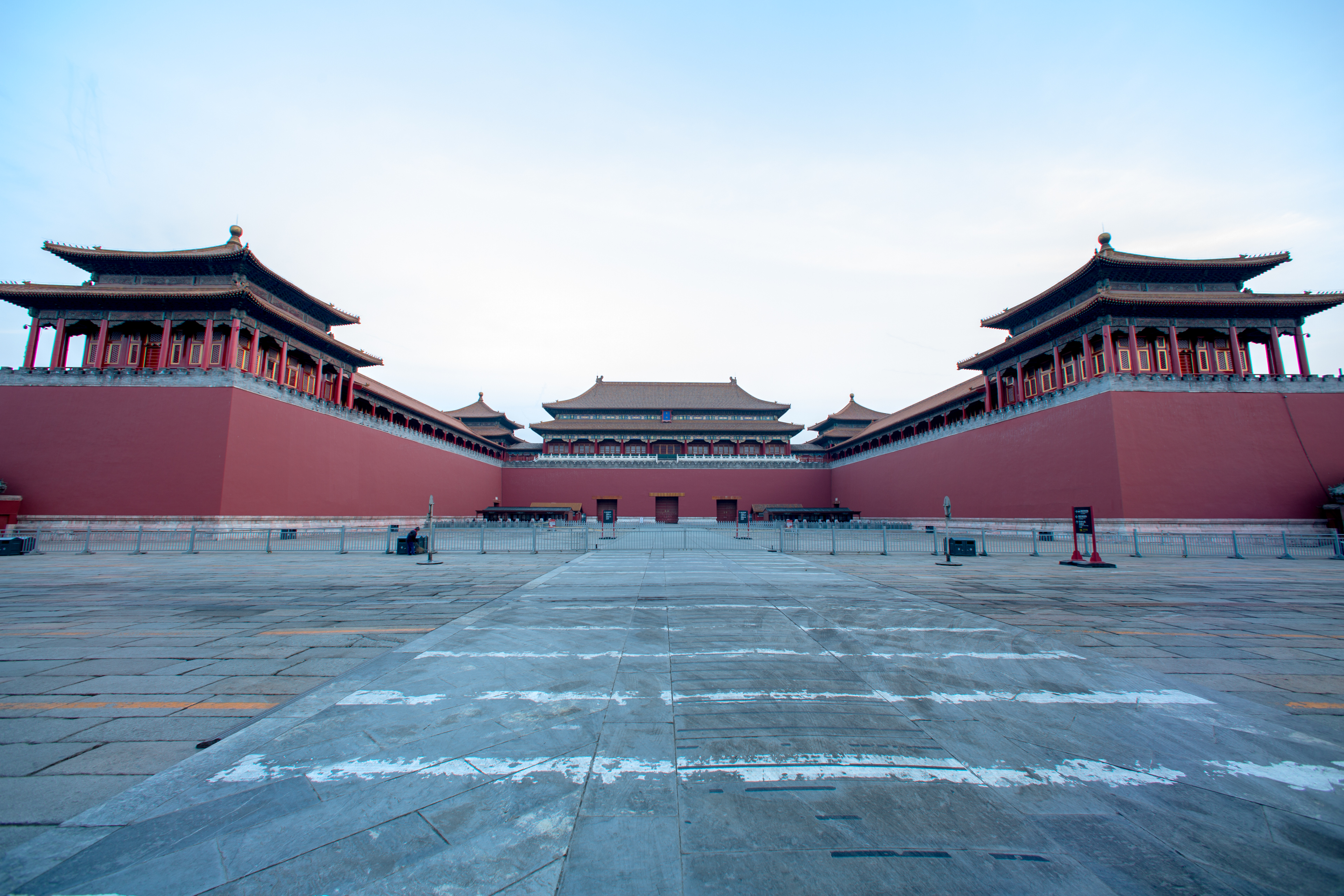
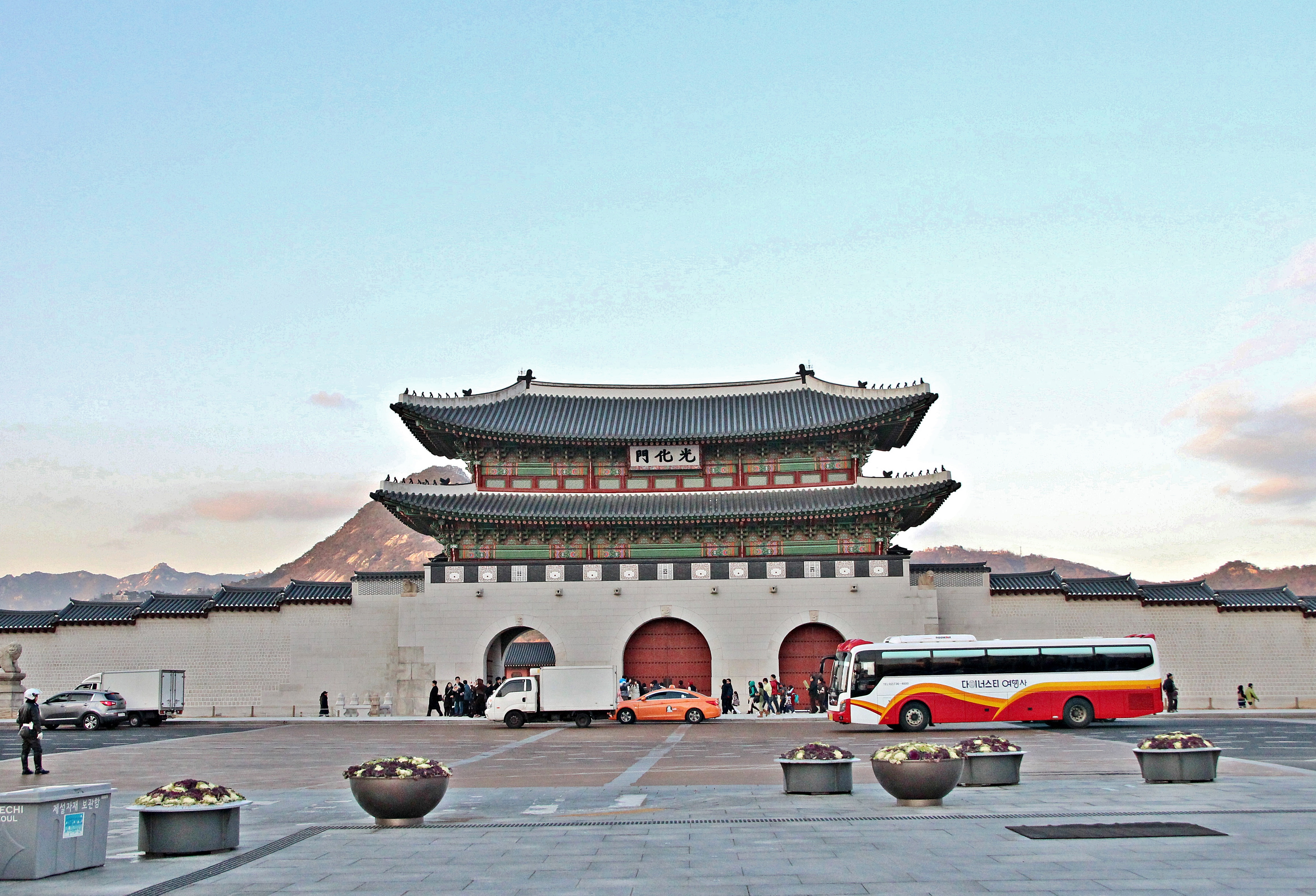
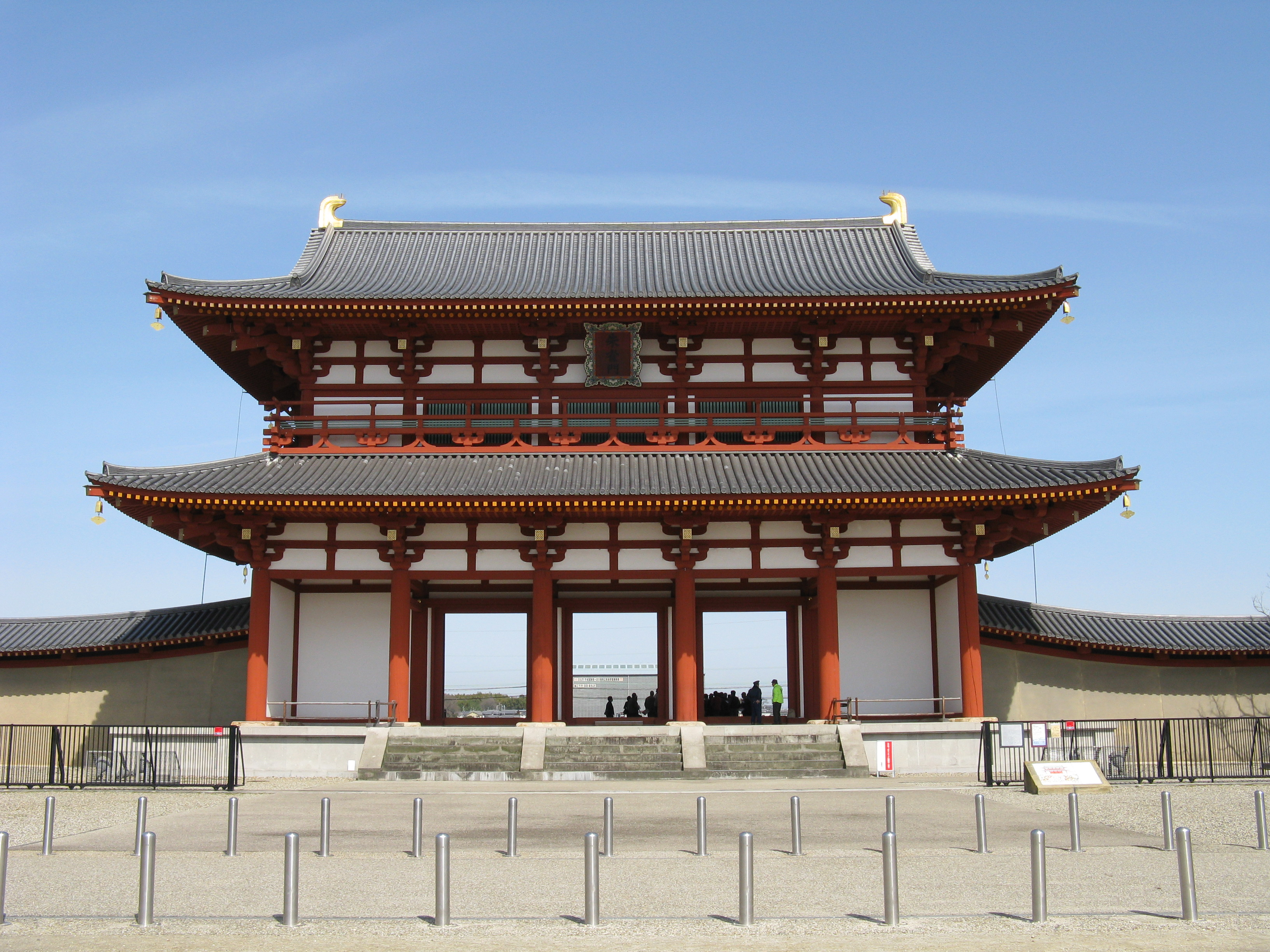
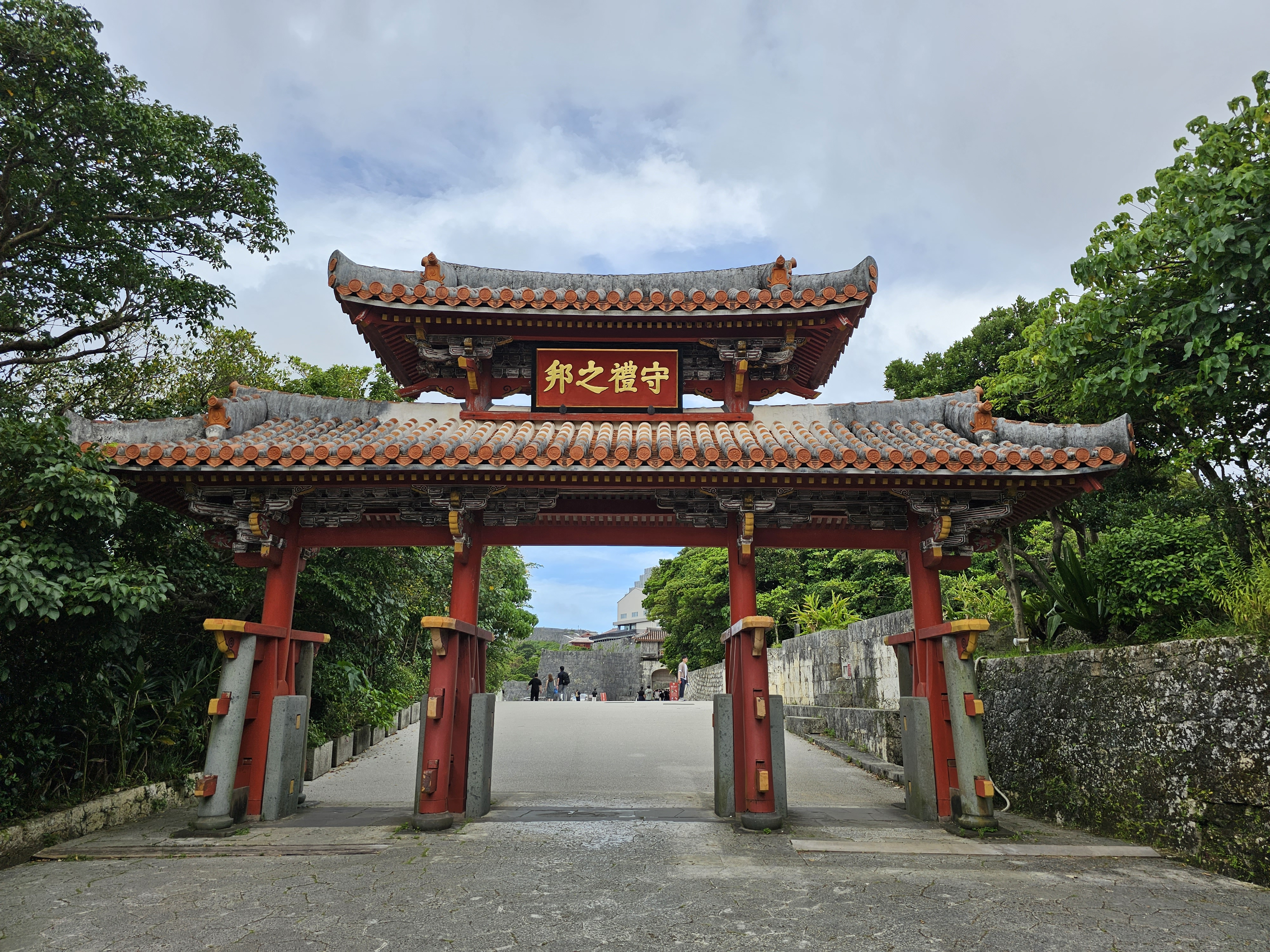
The Main Gates of palaces in Huế, Beijing, Seoul, Nara and Naha . Chinese architecture has had a major influence on the East Asian architectural styles of Vietnam, Korea, and Japan.

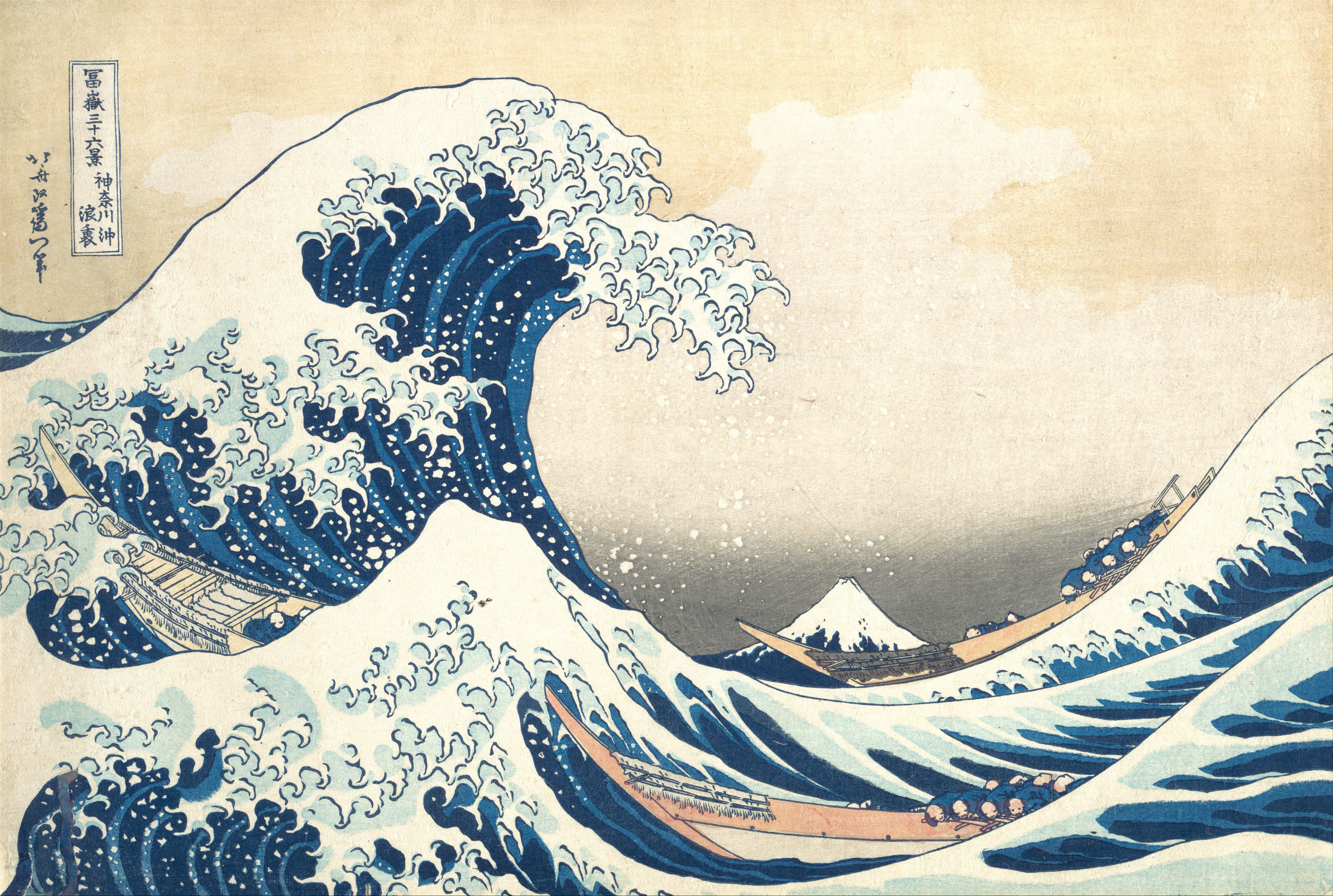
Great Wave off Kanagawa, one of the most famous Japanese woodblock prints

Cultural commonalities among the Sinosphere countries reflect their shared source of influence from Imperial China.

=== Structure of the personal name ===
The structure of personal names in the Sinosphere follows the surname-first order, also known as the Eastern name order. Additionally, Korean and Vietnamese personal name share a structure similar to the Chinese one, in that they have many monosyllabic surnames in common (e.g. Lee, Chen,..), and full names typically consist of about two to four monosyllables, corresponding to Sino-Xenic morphemes historically derived from Chinese characters.

=== Arts ===
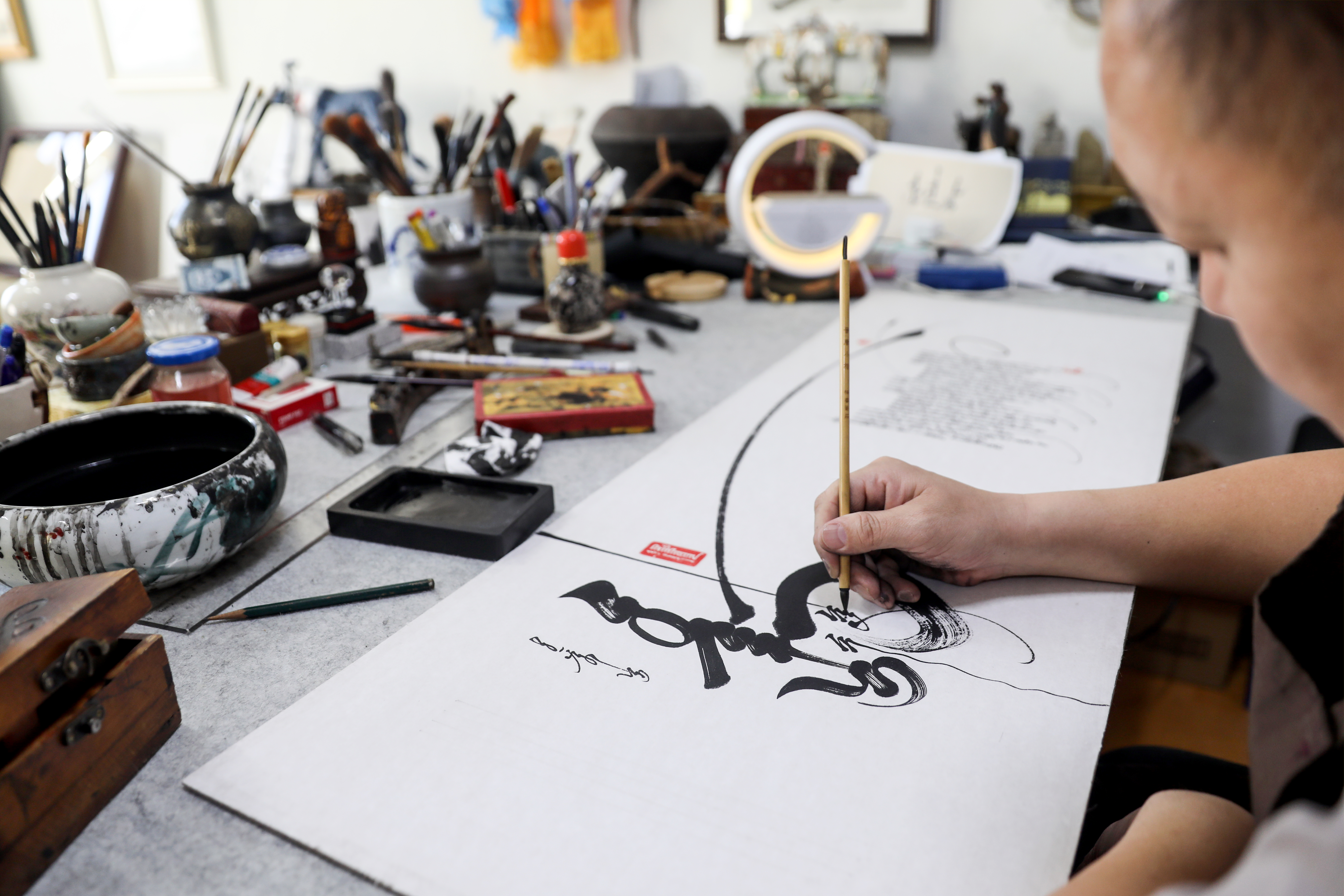
Mongolian calligraphy is deeply influenced by the Sinosphere.

- Architecture: Countries of the East Asian cultural sphere (Japan, Korea, Vietnam, Taiwan, China) share a common architectural style stemming from the architecture of ancient China.
- Calligraphy: Caoshu is a cursive script style used in Chinese and East Asian calligraphy.
- Cinema: see Hong Kong cinema, Taiwanese cinema, Chinese cinema, Japanese cinema, Korean cinema, Vietnamese cinema
- Comic: see manga (Japanese comics), manhua (Chinese comics), manhwa (Korean comics), truyện tranh (Vietnamese comics)
- Gardening: The art of cultivating miniature trees and landscapes: see bonsai (Japanese), penjing (Chinese), bunjae (Korean), hòn non bộ (Vietnamese)
- Martial arts: see gōngfu (kung fu; Chinese martial arts); taekwondo and hapkido (Korean martial arts); karate, aikido, judo, jujutsu and sumo (Japanese martial arts); vovinam and nhất nam (Vietnamese martial arts)
- Music: Chinese musical instruments, such as the erhu, have influenced those of Korea, Japan, Taiwan, Hong Kong, and Vietnam and Yazheng influenced Japan (koto), Korea(gayageum) and Mongolia (yatga).
- Clothing: Hanfu, hanbok, việt phục, and wafuku all use silk. Jade jewelry and ornaments are also highly valued throughout East Asia and Southeast Asia.
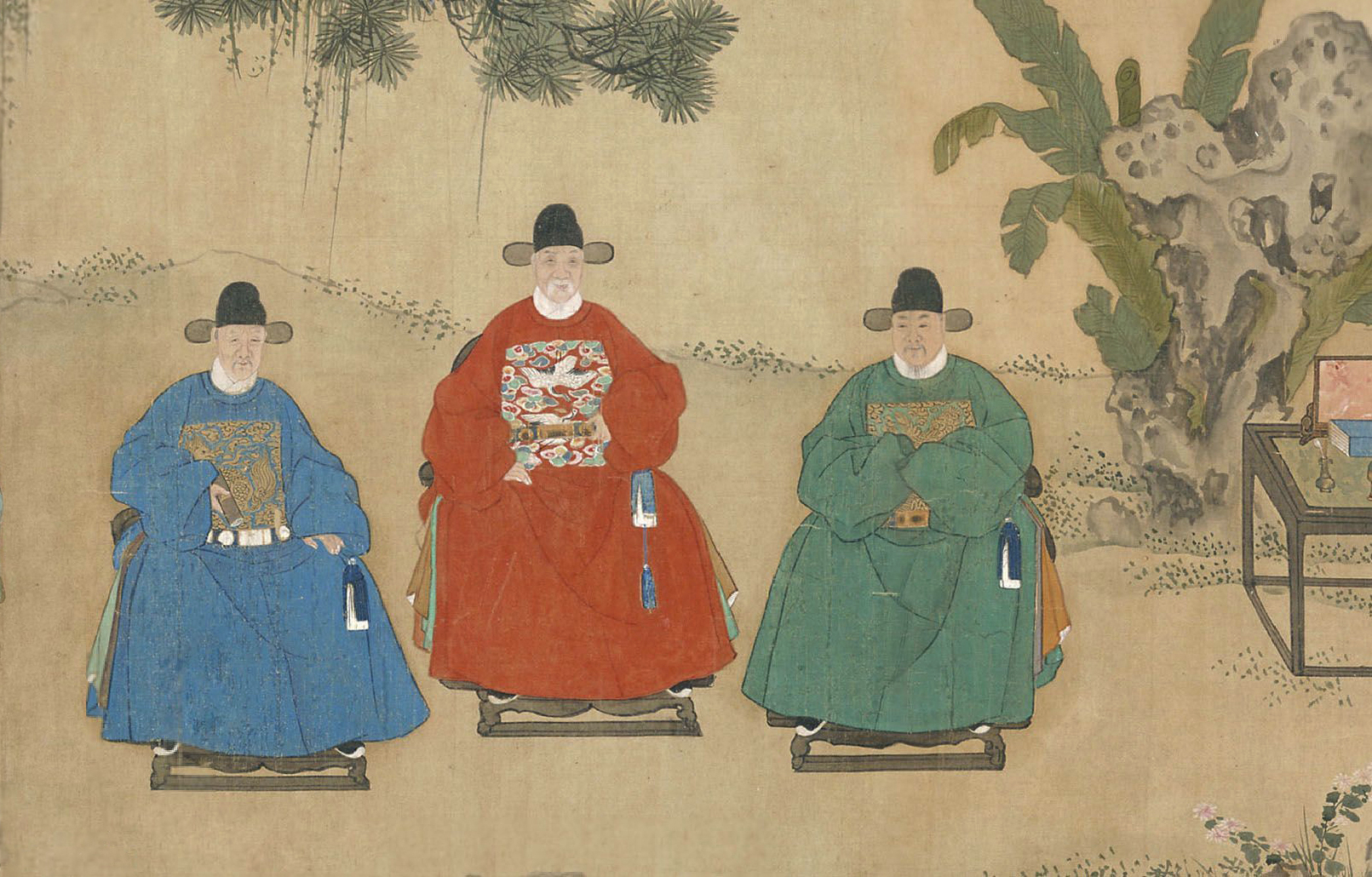
Ming dynasty's mandarins in Hanfu.

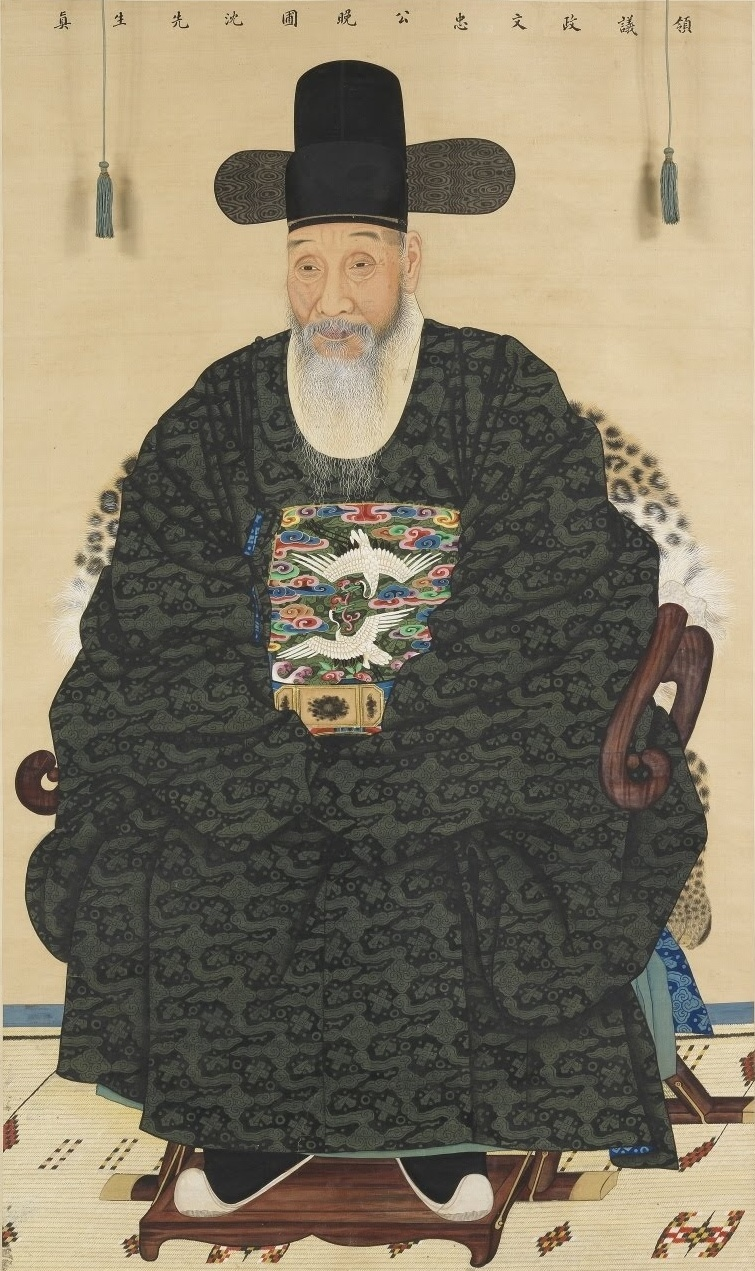
Joseon's Sim Hwan-ji in Gwanbok.

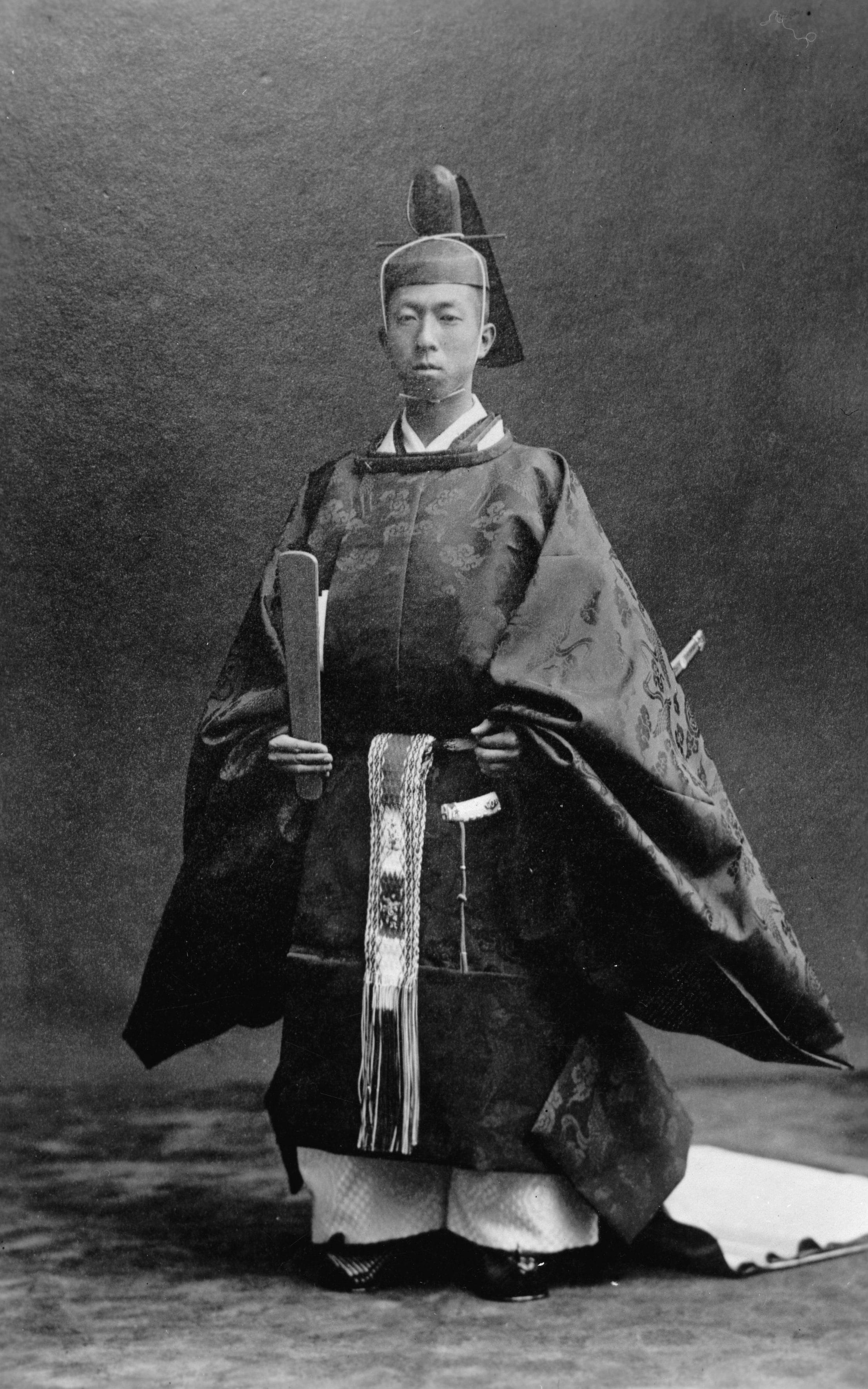
Japanese prince Takahito in Sokutai.

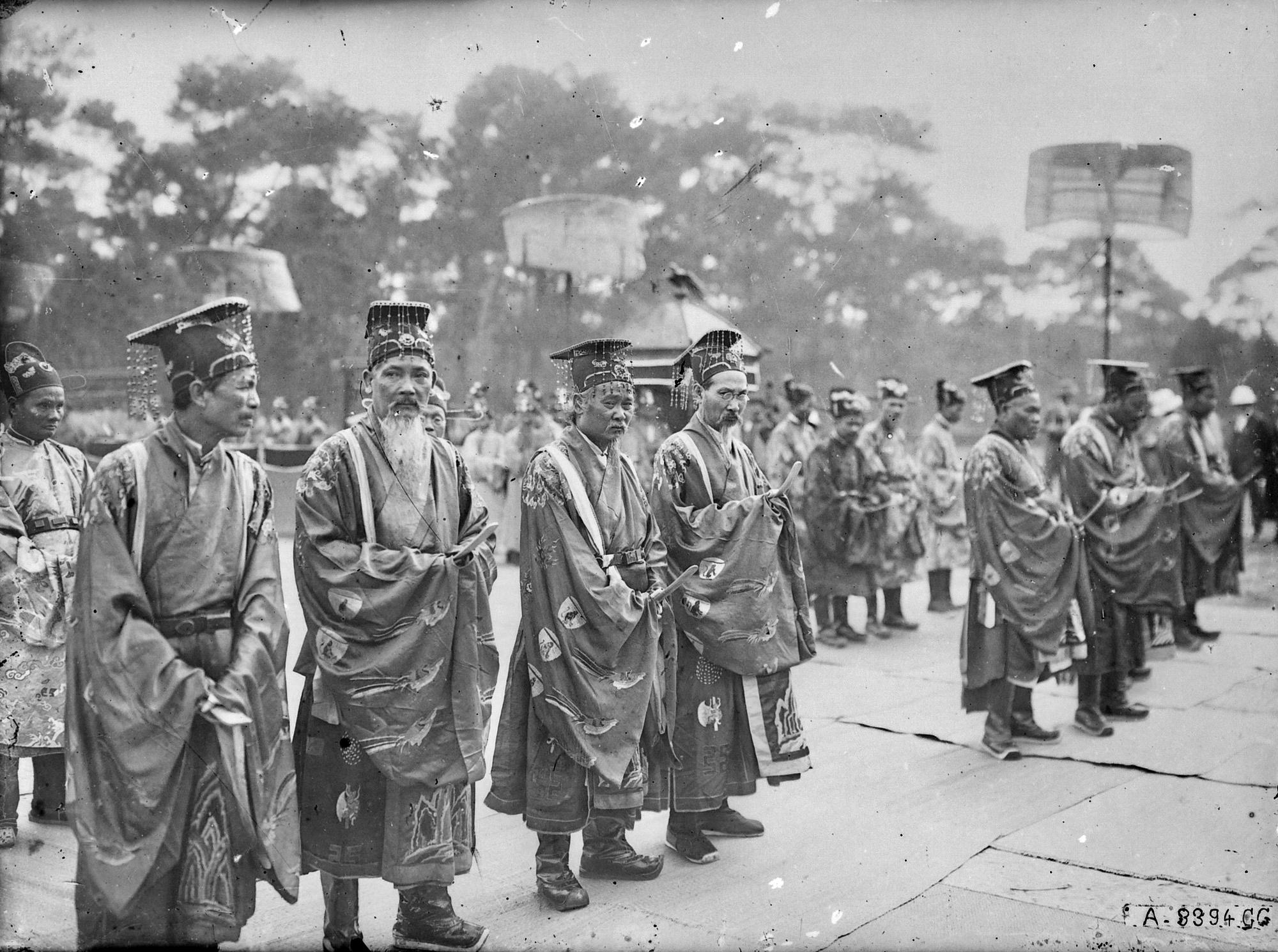
Vietnamese officials wearing Mianfu during the Nam Giao ceremony.

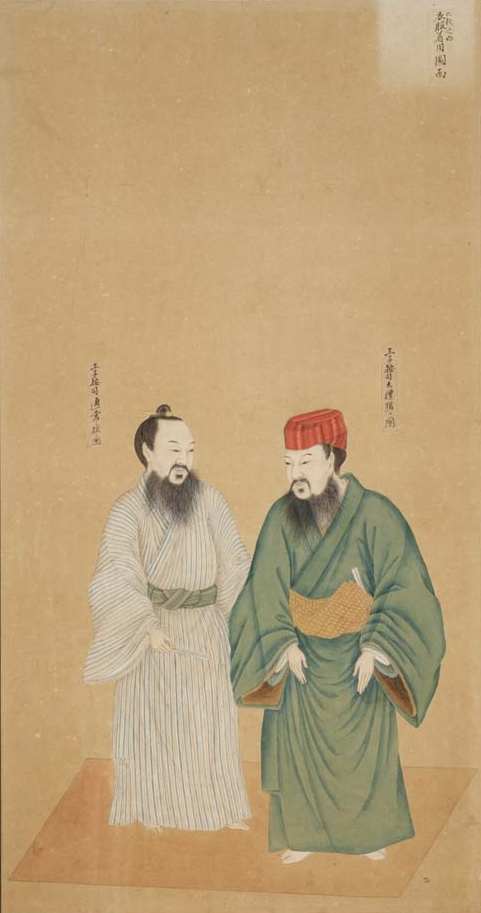
Officials from Ryukyu Kingdom wearing traditional costume.

=== Cuisine ===
The cuisine of East Asia shares many of the same ingredients and techniques. Chopsticks are used as an eating utensil in all of the core East Asian countries. The use of soy sauce, which is made from fermenting soybeans, is also widespread in the region.

Rice is the staple food in all of East Asia and is a major focus of food security. Moreover, in East Asian countries such as Japan (御飯; gohan), Korea (밥; bap), and Vietnam (cơm; 𩚵 or 粓), the word for "cooked rice" can embody the meaning of food in general.

Popular terms associated with East Asian cuisine include boba, kimchi, sushi, hot pot, tea, dim sum, ramen, as well as phở, sashimi, udon, and chả giò.

=== Traditions ===
- Fashion: see hanfu and cheongsam (or qipao) (Chinese and Manchu); việt phục and áo dài (Vietnamese); (deel) (Mongolian); hanbok (Korean); kimono and wafuku (Japanese)
- Dance: The lion dance is a form of traditional dance in Chinese culture and other East Asian countries, in which performers in a lion costume mimic a lion's movements to bring good luck and fortune. Aside from China, versions of the lion dance are found in Japan, Korea, Vietnam, Tibet, and Taiwan. Lion dances are usually performed during Lunar New Year celebrations.
- New Year: China (Zhōngguó Xīn Nián), Korea (Seollal), Vietnam (Tết Nguyên Đán), Mongolia (Tsagaan sar), Japan (Koshōgatsu), and Taiwan traditionally observe the same Lunar New Year. However, Japan has moved its New Year (Shōgatsu) to fit the Western New Year since the Meiji Restoration. Although mainland Japan no longer celebrates Lunar New Year, some indigenous minority ethnic groups in Japan still do, such as the Ryukyuan people (Okinawans). Okinawa has traditionally observed the Lunar New Year because of heavy Chinese influence in its past. Okinawans still celebrate and partake in many traditions for Lunar New Year, though to less of an extent than Western New Year.

=== Literature ===
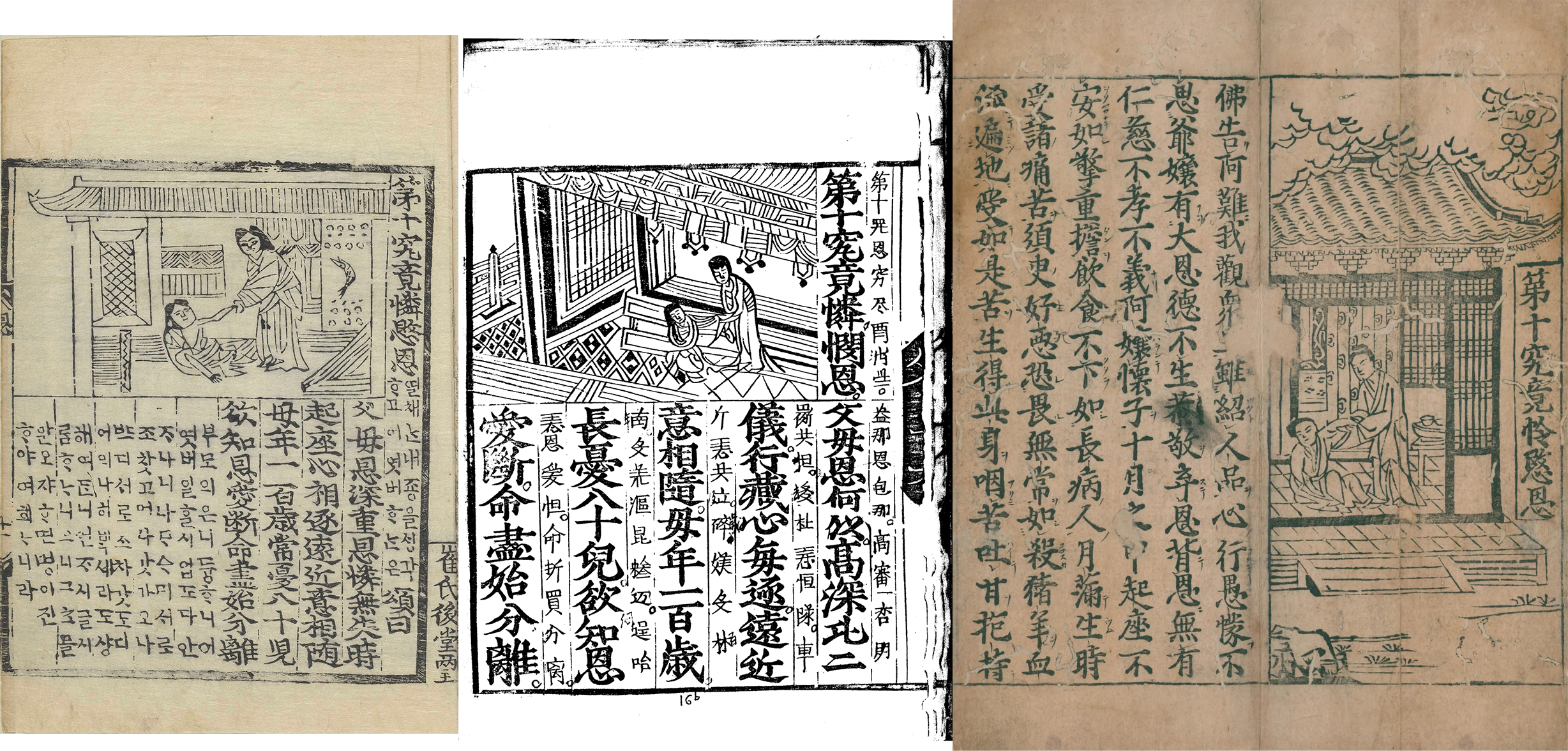
Illustrated editions of the Sutra of Filial Piety (佛說大報父母恩重經) in Korean (left), Vietnamese (center), and Japanese (right). The Korean edition includes Hangul annotations, the Vietnamese edition includes a Giải âm translation, and the Japanese edition includes Kanbun glossing.

East Asian literary culture is based on the use of Literary Chinese, which became the medium of scholarship, administration, and government across the region. Although Vietnam, Korea, and Japan each developed vernacular writing systems for their languages, these were limited to popular literature. Literary Chinese remained the medium of formal writing until the late 19th and early 20th centuries, when it was swept away by rising nationalism and displaced by vernacular writing.

Though they did not use Chinese for spoken communication, each country had its own tradition of reading texts aloud, the so-called Sino-Xenic pronunciations, which provide clues to the pronunciation of Middle Chinese. Chinese words with these pronunciations were also borrowed extensively by local vernaculars and today comprise over half their vocabularies. Vernacular or standard Chinese encompassing varieties of Chinese also developed alongside the use of Literary Chinese.

Books in Literary Chinese were widely distributed. By the 7th century and possibly earlier, woodblock printing had been developed in China. At first, it was used only to copy Buddhist scriptures, but later secular works were also printed. By the 13th century, metal movable type was used by government printers in Korea but seems to have not been extensively used in China, Vietnam, or Japan. At the same time, manuscript reproduction remained important until the late 19th century.

Japan's textual scholarship had Chinese origins, which made Japan one of the birthplaces of modern sinology.

The Four Books and Five Classics are the authoritative books of Confucianism, which were used to study for civil service examinations in China, Korea, and Vietnam.

== Philosophy and religion ==
The Art of War, Tao Te Ching, I Ching, and Analects are classic Chinese texts that have been influential in East Asian history. More generally, the philosophies and practices of Taoism, Buddhism, and Confucianism have had long-standing and deep-rooted influence in Sinosphere countries.

=== Taoism ===
Taoism has influenced countries throughout the Sinosphere. The Taoist school of thought emerged in China from the teachings of Lao Tse. It follows the search for the tao, a concept that is equivalent to a 'path' or 'course' and represents the cosmic force that creates the universe and all things. According to this belief, the wisdom of the tao is the only source of the universe and represents a natural path of life events. Thus, the adherents of Taoism follow the search for tao, which represents the strength of the universe.

The most important text in Taoism, the Tao Te Ching ("Book of the Way and Virtue", c. 300 BC), declares that the tao is the "source" of the universe, thus considered a creative principle, but not as a deity. Nature manifests itself spontaneously, without a higher intention, and it is up to humans to integrate, through "non-action" (wu wei) and spontaneity (zi ran), to its flow and rhythms, in order to achieve happiness and a long life.

Taoism is a combination of teachings from various sources; it manifests as a system that can be philosophical, religious, or ethical. The tradition can also be presented as a worldview and a way of life.

=== Buddhism ===
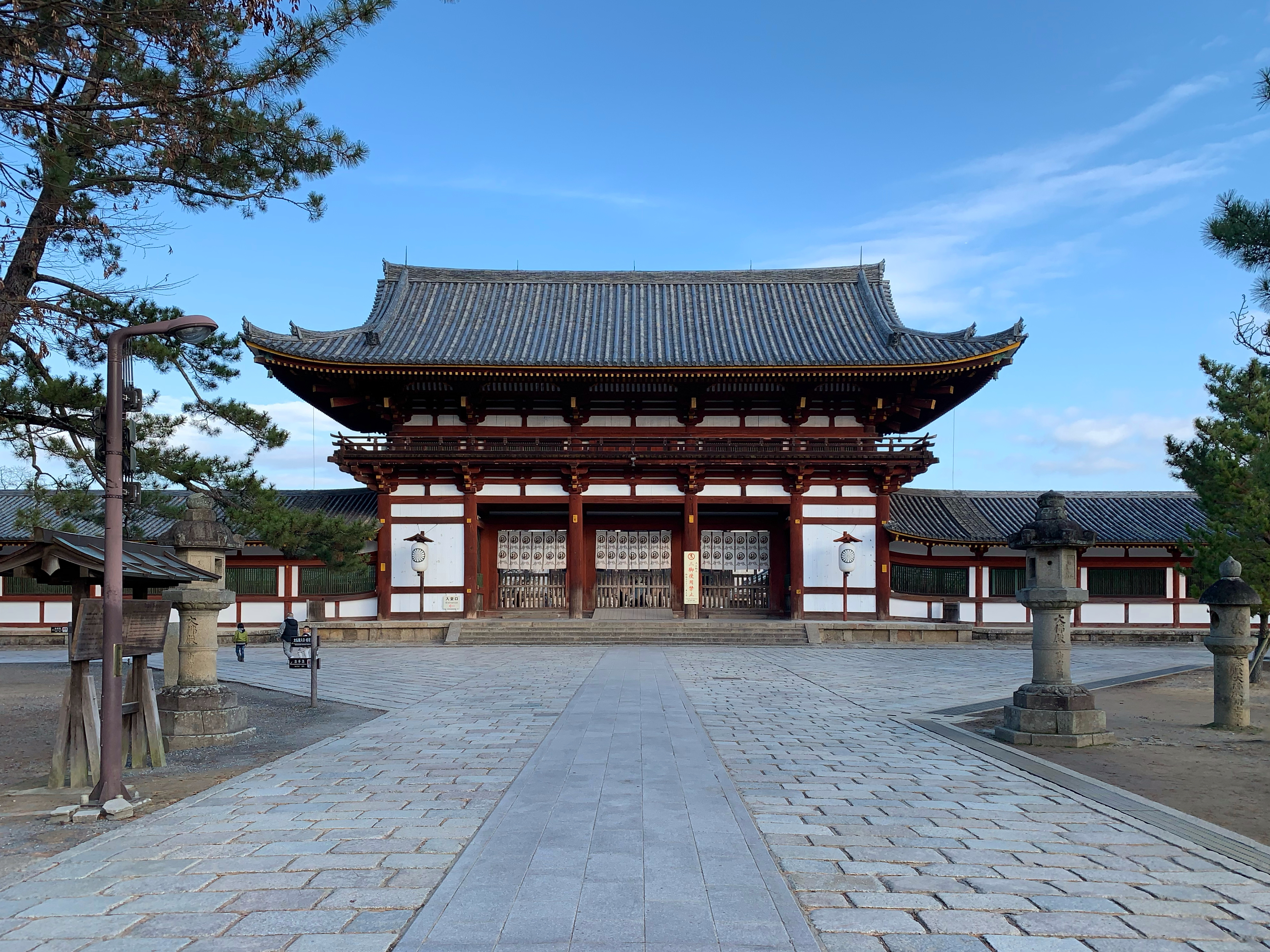
Todaiji in Nara, Japan is affiliated to the Huayan School of Mahayana Buddhism, which is a religion particular to the Sinic world

Buddhist philosophy is guided by the teachings of the Buddha, which lead the individual to enlightenment through meditative practices, mindfulness, and reflection on their daily actions. The belief is that physical and spiritual awareness leads to a state of enlightenment called nirvana, which, according to Buddha, is the highest state of meditation. In this state the individual finds peace and tranquility above the oscillations of thoughts and emotions and is rid of the inherent suffering of the physical world.

Buddhism in the Sinosphere is or derives from Mahayana Buddhism, a sect which is seen to be intertwined within Taoism and Confucianism. It advocates for altruism and compassion, as well as understanding and escaping from suffering in relation to karma. Vegetarianism or veganism is followed by more monastic or devout Buddhists of this sect, and even among lay Buddhists, as it leads to compassion for all living, sentient beings.

=== Confucianism ===
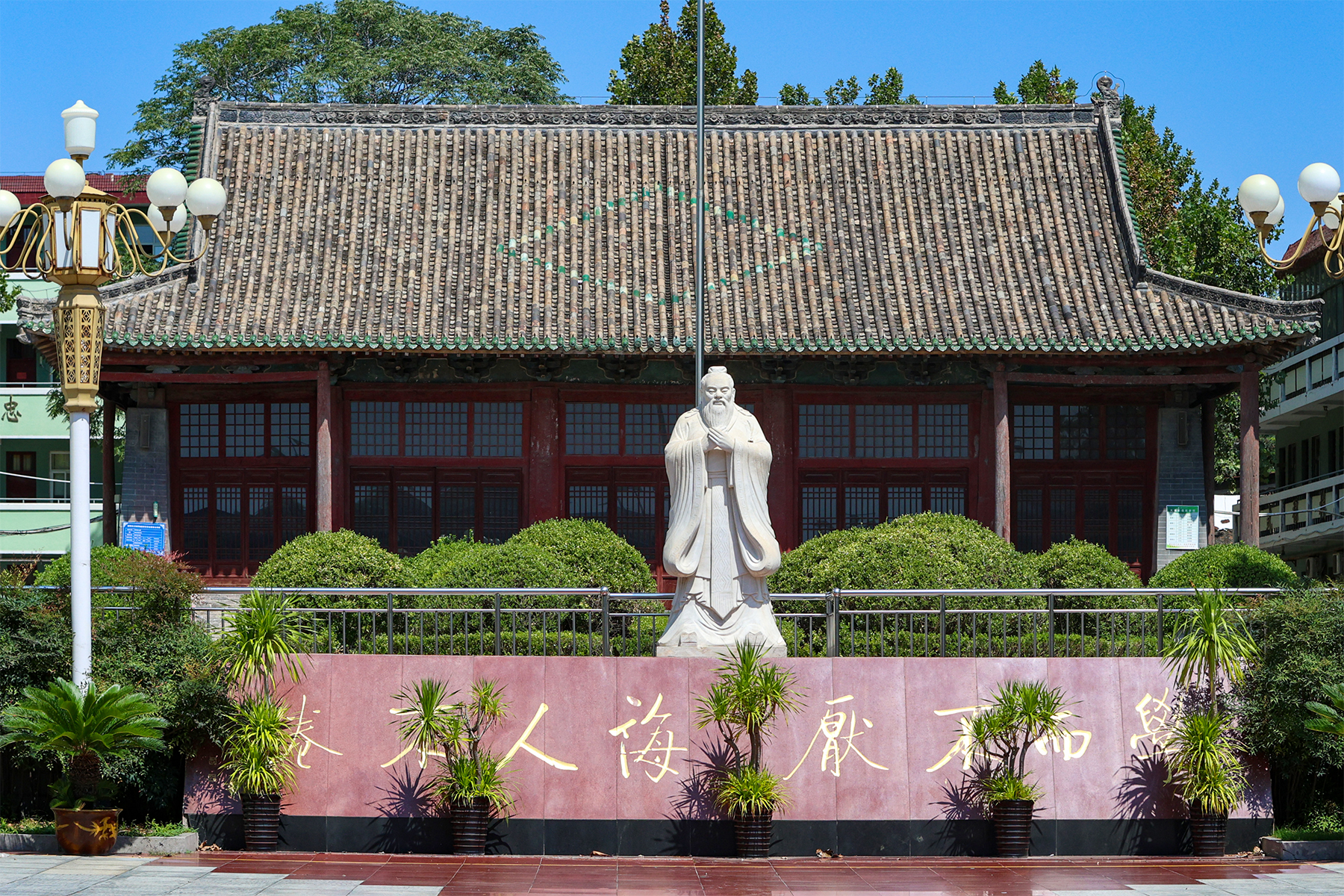
Confucius Statue in Tangyin, China. Confucianism plays a crucial part in East Asian culture.

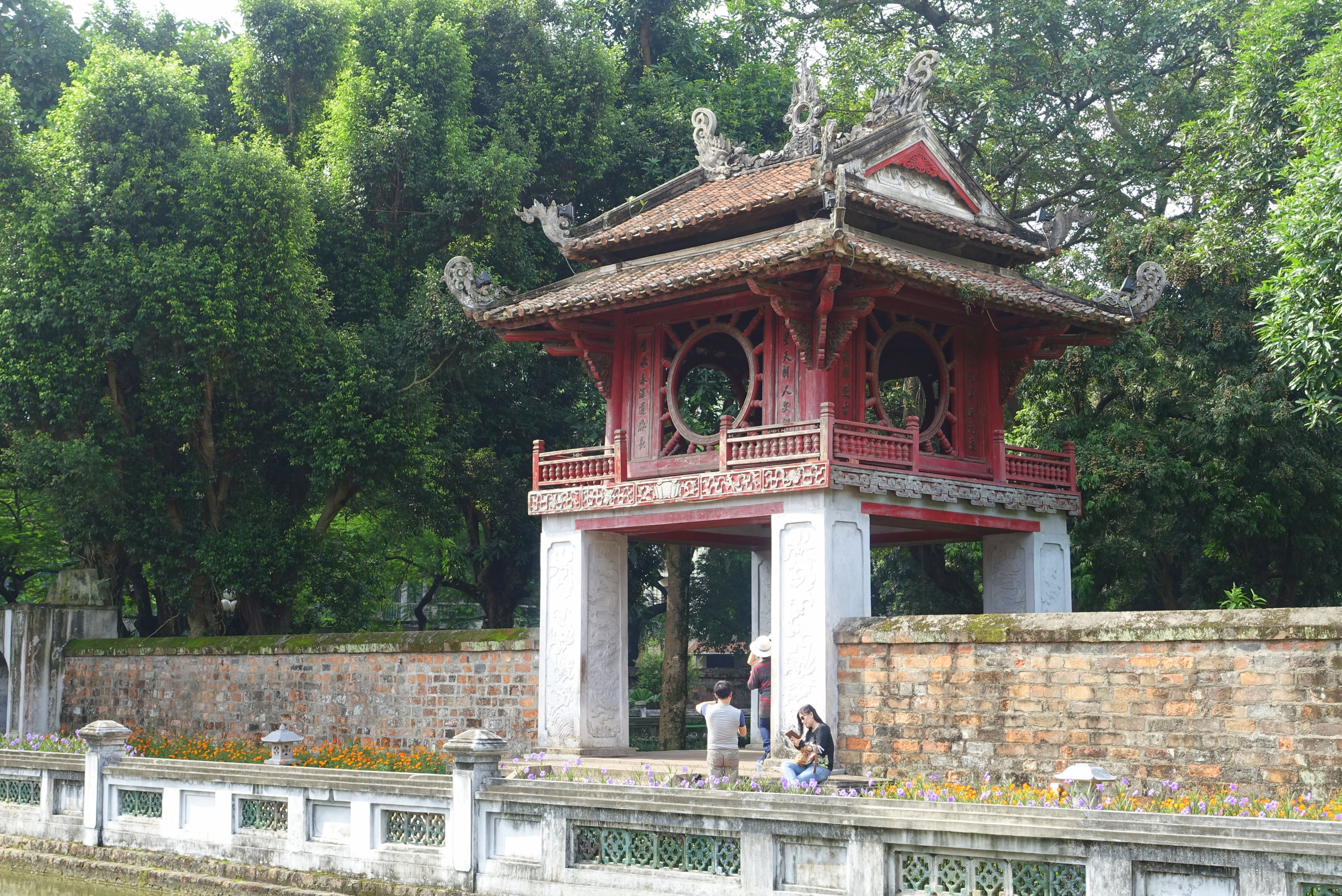
Temple of Literature, Hanoi. Confucian education and imperial examinations played a huge role in creating scholars and mandarins (bureaucrats) for East Asian dynasties.

The countries of China, Japan, Korea, and Vietnam share a Confucian philosophical worldview. Confucianism is a humanistic philosophy that believes that human beings are teachable, improvable, and perfectible through personal and communal endeavor, especially including self-cultivation and self-creation. Confucianism focuses on the cultivation of virtue and maintenance of ethics, the most basic of which are:

- rén (仁): an obligation of altruism and humaneness for other individuals
- yì (义/義): the upholding of righteousness and the moral disposition to do good
- lǐ (礼/禮): a system of norms and propriety that determines how a person should properly act in everyday life

==== Neo-Confucianism ====
Mid-Imperial Chinese philosophy is primarily defined by the development of neo-Confucianism, which has its origins in the Tang dynasty. The Confucianist scholar Han Yu is seen as a forebear of the neo-Confucianists of the Song dynasty. The Song dynasty philosopher Zhou Dunyi is seen as the first true "pioneer" of neo-Confucianism, using Taoist metaphysics as a framework for his ethical philosophy.

Elsewhere in East Asia, Japanese philosophy began to develop as indigenous Shinto beliefs fused with Buddhism, Confucianism, and other schools of Chinese philosophy. Similarly, in Korean philosophy, elements of shamanism were integrated into the neo-Confucianism imported from China. In Vietnam, neo-Confucianism, along with Taoism and Buddhism, were also developed into Vietnam's own Tam giáo, which together with Vietnamese folk religion shaped Vietnamese philosophy.

=== Other religions ===
Though not commonly identified with East Asia, the following religions have been influential in its history.

Christianity is the most popular religion in South Korea, followed by Buddhism. Significant Christian communities are also found in mainland China, Hong Kong, Macau, Taiwan, Singapore, Japan, and Vietnam. In recent years, various denominations of Christianity, mainly Protestantism and Catholicism, have gained popularity in these areas, due to its own version of spirituality and charitability. However, it is unlikely to supersede the more natively rooted Buddhism, except in places like South Korea where Protestantism is more popular. In Vietnam, Roman Catholicism is prominent, and early Christian missionaries played a historical role in romanizing the Vietnamese language prior to French colonial rule.

- In South Korea, mainland China, and Hong Kong, Protestantism is the most common denomination, followed by Catholicism.
- In Taiwan, most follow Presbyterianism, followed by Catholicism.
- In Vietnam and Macau, Catholicism is more common, followed by Protestantism.
- In Japan, of the minority that are Christian, 60% were Protestant and the rest were Roman Catholic.
- In places with a Chinese majority but the potential for English as a first language, such as Singapore, Christianity is becoming more popular, with the most popular being Protestant branches, followed by Catholicism.

Islam has been practiced in China since the 7th century CE. It is the most popular religion in Xinjiang and has significant communities in Ningxia.

For Hinduism, see Hinduism in Vietnam, Hinduism in China.

No specific religious affiliation may also be practiced, and is often the most cited in several aforementioned countries. However, regardless of religious affiliations, most people in the Sinosphere are entwined with traces of Buddhism, Confucianism, and Taoism, or native religions and philosophies.

== Language ==
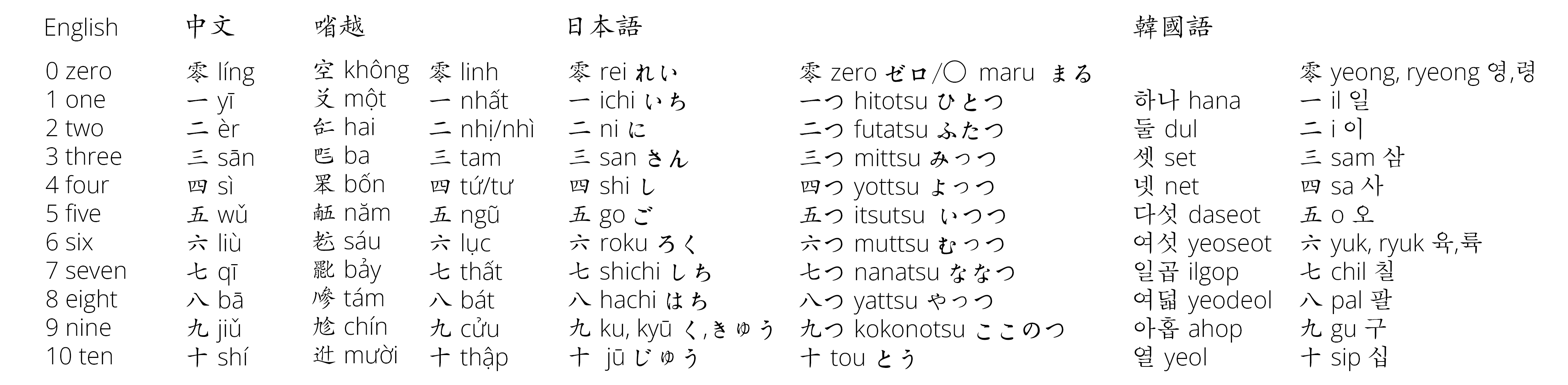
Numbers in Chinese and Sinoxenic languages

=== Languages and language families ===
The following language families are found in and around the East Asian cultural sphere. Some have historically contributed to the vocabulary or development of Sinitic languages, while others have been influenced by them to some degree. Only some of these languages are highly indebted to Literary Chinese and thus relevant to the East Asian cultural sphere.

Language family	Regions spoken	Major languages	Note	Ref
Sino-Tibetan	China (PRC & ROC/Taiwan), Singapore, Malaysia, Myanmar, Christmas Island, Bhutan, northeast India, Kashmir, parts of Nepal	Varieties of Chinese, Tibetic languages, Burmese	These are thought to have originated around the Yellow River, north of the Yangtze.	
Austronesian	Taiwan, Brunei, Timor-Leste, Indonesia, Philippines, Singapore, Malaysia, Cocos (Keeling) Islands, Christmas Island, Madagascar, most of Oceania	Formosan languages, Malay, Filipino, Malagasy, Māori		
Turkic	China, Russia, Turkmenistan, Kyrgyzstan, Uzbekistan, Kazakhstan, Azerbaijan, Iran, Cyprus, Turkey	Kazakh, Kyrgyz, Uyghur, Uzbek, Azerbaijani, Turkish		
Austroasiatic	Vietnam, Cambodia, Laos, Myanmar, Thailand, Bangladesh, Malaysia, India, Nepal, Bhutan, Yunnan, Guangxi, Nicobar Islands	Vietnamese, Khmer, Wa, Mon, Santali, Khasi		
Kra-Dai	Thailand, Laos, parts of southern China	Zhuang, Thai, Lao		
Mongolic	Mongolia, China, Russia	Oirat, Mongolian, Monguor, Dongxiang, Buryat		
Tungusic	China, Russia	Evenki, Manchu, Xibe		
Koreanic	Korea	Korean, Jeju		
Japonic	Japan	Japanese, Ryukyuan, Hachijo		
Ainu	Japan	Hokkaido Ainu	The only surviving Ainu language is Hokkaido Ainu.	

The core languages of the East Asian cultural sphere are predominantly Chinese, Japanese, Korean, and Vietnamese (CJKV), and their respective variants. These are well-documented to have historically used Chinese characters, with Japanese, Korean, and Vietnamese each having roughly 60% of their vocabulary derived from Chinese. There is a small set of minor languages that are comparable to the core East Asian languages, such as Zhuang and Hmong-Mien. They are often overlooked, since neither have their own country nor heavily export their culture, but Zhuang has been written in Hanzi-inspired characters called Sawndip for over 1,000 years. Hmong, while having supposedly lacked a writing system until modern history, is also suggested to have a similar percentage of Chinese loans to the core CJKV languages.

Due to the common usage of Chinese characters across East Asian nations, Chinese, Japanese, Korean, and Vietnamese people traditionally can engage in written communication using Literary Chinese without knowing other people's spoken language, a method called brushtalk.

As a result, Japanese, Korean, and Vietnamese are also deemed Sino-Xenic languages that are highly influenced by ancient forms of Literary Chinese.

=== Writing systems ===
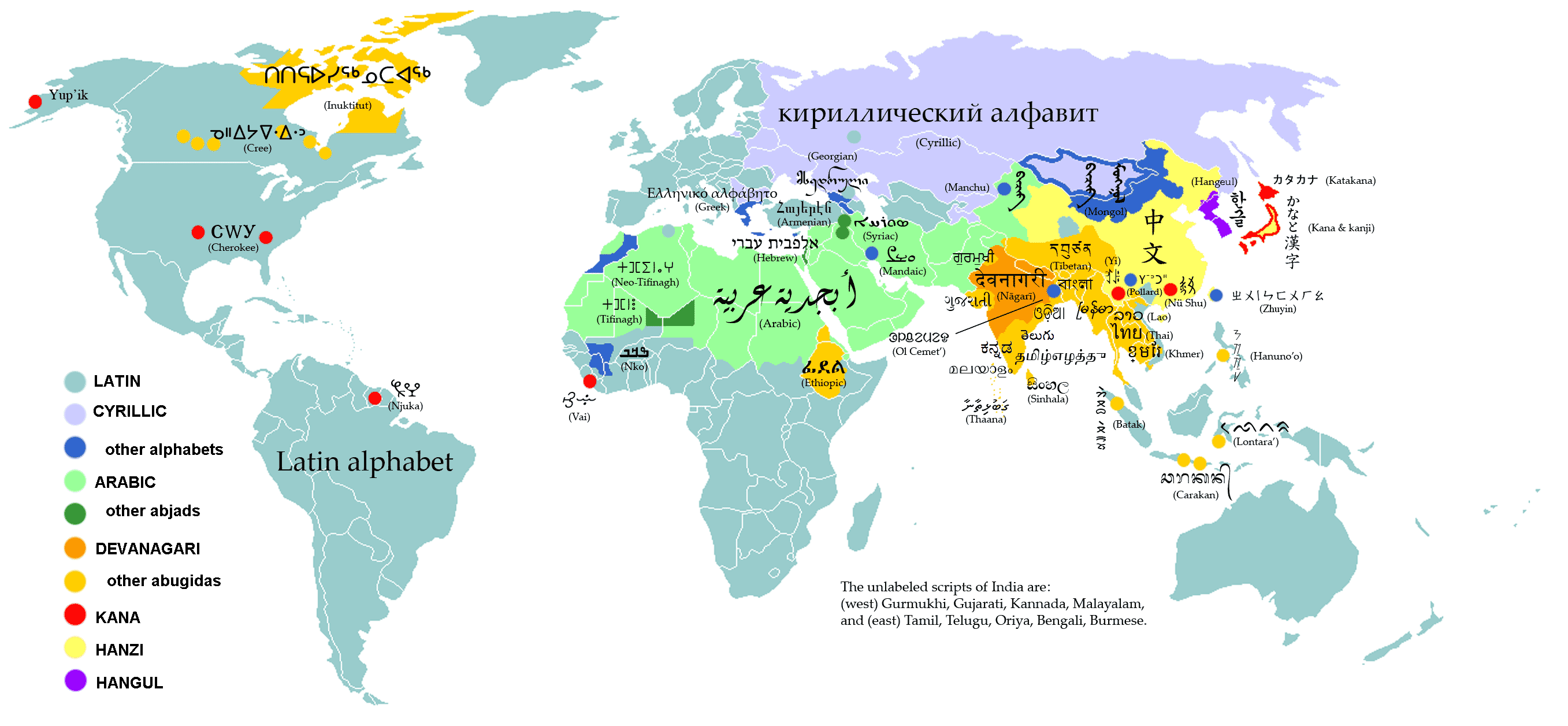
Writing systems around the world

Writing systems of the Far East
Writing system		Regions used
Logograms	Hanzi and its variants	China, Japan, Korea, Singapore, Vietnam*, Taiwan
Logograms	Dongba symbols	China (used by the Naxi ethnic minorities in China)
Logograms	Chữ Nôm	Vietnam*, China (Dongxing, Guangxi)
Syllabary	Kana	Japan
Syllabary	Yi script	China (used by the Yi ethnic minorities in China)
Semi-syllabary	Bopomofo	Taiwan, and historically mainland China. Used to aid in the learning of Hanzi, especially reading and writing, in elementary schools. On the mainland it is used only in the Xiandai Hanyu Cidian.
Alphabet	Latin	Vietnam, China (used by some ethnic minorities in China, such as the Miao people); Taiwan (Tâi-lô Latin script for the Taiwanese Hokkien language)
Alphabet	Hangul	Korea, China (used by the Choson ethnic minorities in northeastern China)
Alphabet	Cyrillic	Mongolia (though there is a movement to switch back to Mongolian script)
Alphabet	Mongolian	Mongolia*, China (Inner Mongolia)
Abugida	Brahmic scripts of Indian origin	Singapore, China (Tibet, Xishuangbanna Dai Autonomous Prefecture)
Abugida	Pollard script	China (used by the Hmong ethnic minorities in China)
Abjad	Uyghur Arabic alphabet	China (Xinjiang)
* Official usage historically. Currently used unofficially.

Chinese characters are considered the common culture that unifies the languages and cultures of many East Asian nations. Today, mainland China, Malaysia, and Singapore use Simplified Chinese characters, whereas Taiwan, Hong Kong, and Macau use Traditional Chinese characters.

Historically, Japan, Korea, and Vietnam have also used Chinese characters. Today, they are still used in Japan and South Korea, albeit in different forms.

Japan invented kana, inspired by the Chinese cursive script, which is the main script used today. However, it is still heavily supplemented by the use of kanji to aid in disambiguation of homonyms.

Korea used to write in hanja but has invented an alphabetic system called hangul that is nowadays the majority script. Most names still use hanja in addition to the hangul names, however, hanja names are rarely used in everyday life. Hanja is also studied and used in academia, newspapers, and law—areas where a lot of scholarly terms and Sino-Korean loanwords are used and necessary to distinguish between otherwise ambiguous homonyms.

Vietnam used to write in chữ Hán (Chinese characters) in Classical Chinese texts (Hán văn). In the 8th century, the Vietnamese began inventing many of their own chữ Nôm characters. Since French colonization, they have switched to using a modified version of the Latin alphabet called chữ Quốc ngữ. Chinese characters had a long and great influence on Vietnamese history and literature, and thus still hold a special place in Vietnamese culture. In Vietnam (and North Korea), chữ Hán can be seen in temples, cemeteries, and monuments as well as serving as decorative motifs in art and design.

Zhuang people are similar to the Vietnamese in that they used to write in Sawgun (Chinese characters) and have invented many of their own characters, called Sawndip. Sawndip is still used informally and in traditional settings, but the Chinese government officially promotes the use of an alphabetical script, which it introduced in 1957, for the language.

== Economy and trade ==
=== Business culture ===
The business cultures of East Asia are heavily influenced by Buddhism, Confucianism, and Taoism. Common factors across the Sinosphere tend to place great emphasis and respect towards traits of humility and conformity.

Japan often features hierarchically organized companies, and Japanese work environments place a high value on interpersonal relationships. A leader of a Japanese company is typically valued on their ability to maintain social harmony, and to unify or bring together their employees, rather than simply being the top decision maker.

Korean businesses, adhering to Confucian values, are structured around a patriarchal family governed by filial piety (孝順) between management and employees, where knowing one's place within the hierarchy, and showing respect for a person's age and status, are very important in Korean society. It is not uncommon for people in a Korean office to refer to others as their seniors (seonbae) or their juniors (hubae). A person's position within a company usually reflects their age, and juniors tend to listen to their seniors without pause. Koreans value maintaining a social harmonious environment that allows a worker's kibun (mood or emotional feelings) to remain balanced.

Maintaining face is usually how business and social relationships work in East Asia, whereas aggressively patronising others, or criticising them publicly in front of others, tend to be the ways to lose business relationships. In Chinese business culture, there is a high value on nurturing relationships using the social concept of guanxi, which refers to a state of having personal trust and a solid relationship with someone, and can involve exchanging favours and have moral obligations to one another.

Vietnamese culture tends to be hierarchical by age and seniority. The Vietnamese prefer to work with those who they trust, extending this to business relations that often are maintained between peers and relatives. Women have an important role in Vietnamese culture (owing to their historical status as soldiers). Interpersonal relationships are also highly valued. Vietnamese businesspeople may take spoken word as fact. Maintaining face is highly important—anger or displaying temper will reduce trust. When there are disruptions in harmony, Vietnamese may use silence as a way of allowing any tension to simmer down.

=== History ===
During the Industrial Revolution, East Asia modernized and became an area of economic power, starting with the Meiji Restoration in the late 19th century, when Japan rapidly transformed itself into the only industrial power outside the North Atlantic area.

==== Postwar economies ====
Hong Kong's successful post–WWII economy, based on developing strong textile and manufacturing industries, led to the territory's categorization as one of the Four Asian Tigers. South Korea followed a similar route, developing its textile industry. After the post–WWII US military occupation of the country, the Korean War, and the ultimate division of the peninsula, South Korea experienced what has become known as the Miracle on the Han River, with the rise of chaebols like Samsung and LG strongly driving its economy. As of 2023, South Korea had the 12th largest economy in the world by nominal GDP.

Japanese economic growth stagnated in the 1990s; yet it currently remains the world's 3rd largest economy by nominal GDP. Presently, higher growth in the region has been experienced by China and the Tiger Cub Economies of Southeast Asia, particularly Vietnam.

The impact of the Vietnam War was devastating. Vietnam only started opening its economy through Đổi Mới reforms in 1986, and the US lifted its embargo on Vietnam only in 1995. Since then, the Vietnamese economy has been developing at a rapid pace.

==== Modern era ====
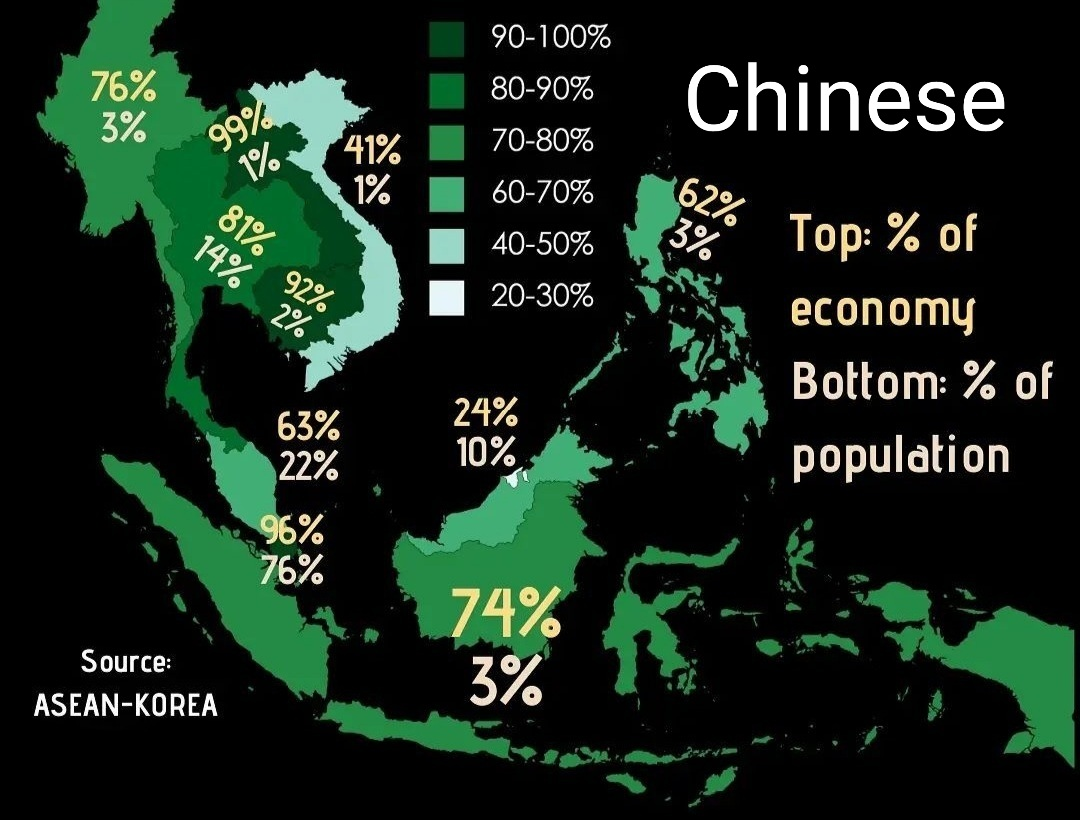
Map of ASEAN nations with the share of economic activity done by Han Chinese people and their population. Singapore, one of the most successful Southeast Asian states, may also be considered as Sinosphere in some circumstances (due to its majority overseas Chinese population).

Up until the early 2010s, Vietnamese trade was heavily dependent on China. Most Chinese-Vietnamese people are from Cantonese background, and can speak Cantonese and Vietnamese, which share many linguistic similarities. Vietnam, one of the Next Eleven countries as of 2005, is regarded as a rising economic power in Southeast Asia.

Since the reform and opening up, China's economy has grown rapidly. In 2020, the country had become the 2nd and 1st-largest economy in the world respectively by nominal GDP and GDP (PPP).

Although Greater China, Japan, and Korea all have extensive links with the rest of ASEAN, Vietnam is the only Sinosphere country that is formally part of ASEAN as a Southeast Asian country. Singapore, a highly developed economy, is also a part of ASEAN with a population that is significantly overseas Chinese. The economies of China and Japan are respectively the world's second- and third-largest economies by nominal GDP, and both are highly influential globally in terms of cultural exportation. South Korea was the 13th largest in 2022 by nominal GDP and has been highly influential as well, with the popularity of the Korean wave since the 1990s. North Korea was the 107th largest, and Vietnam the 35th largest, by nominal GDP in 2023.

Sinosphere countries are involved in various economic groups and initiatives, including:

- Belt and Road Initiative
- Shanghai Cooperation Organization
- ASEAN, ASEAN Plus Three, AFTA
- East Asia Summit
- East Asian Community
- Regional Comprehensive Economic Partnership

== Relations ==
Mutual relations stem from hundreds to thousands of years of history between each Sinosphere state, originating from trade, cultural flow, conquest, and the spread of Classical Chinese writing. Despite these long historical connections, racism and xenophobia stemming from deep-rooted historical, economic, political, or regional differences has also been a major concern. In addition to mutual relations, "Little China" ideologies have been espoused in Vietnam, Japan, and Korea. Proponents of such ideologies claim that their country is the legitimate successor of previous Chinese states and civilizations.

China has had direct relations with its immediate neighbors since at least the first century BC. The Han dynasty conquered parts of northern Vietnam in 111 BC, and northern Korea in 109 BC (although Chinese influence there had begun earlier). Chinese rule and influence continued to impact Vietnam and Korea. China–Vietnam relations are tied to historical confrontations and the transfer of cultural and philosophical thoughts emanating from China to Vietnam. Although the countries are currently similar politically, their relations can also sometimes be fraught and unsound.

The various Baiyue peoples (Vietnamese: Bách Việt, lit. 'Hundred Yue's') were vaguely but historically connected to the southern Chinese and Vietnamese. In the past, [粵] (Yue, Viet, Cantonese) was interchangeable with the homophonous character that today refers specifically to the Vietnamese [越] (Yue, Viet, Vietnamese). Cantonese scholars looked through earlier Chinese sources to find historical information about the Việt/Yue, whether recorded with [粵] or [越].

Vietnam and Korea had semi-official encounters when both countries' envoys met in China from the 16th to 19th centuries. Despite the geographical distance, the countries share parallels, such as colonial rule and political division. South Korea was involved with South Vietnam in the controversial Vietnam War. Today, Vietnam uniquely maintains good relations both with democratic states (like the US and South Korea) and with its historic communist allies (like China and North Korea). Although courteous, Vietnam's separate relations with North Korea and South Korea are made delicate by the tensions on the Korean peninsula. Vietnam was used as neutral ground for the 2019 North Korean–US summit.

China has influenced Japan for around two millennia. Historically, Japan emulated many cultural and philosophical thoughts from China, with many Japanese undertaking studies that came from China or via Korea. Culture, trade, and military confrontation has been a major focal point between the two as well, and relations can become very fraught.

Japan's links with Southeast Asia were mainly through maritime trade stemming from the 16th century. Japan's relations with Vietnam via China goes further back, to the 8th century. Although some residual grievances about Japan's historical colonization in Asia may remain, as well as existing political differences, the relation has mostly been of mutualism. However, instances of mistreatment, such as abuse towards Vietnamese laborers in Japan, has surfaced.

Korea and Japan have had extensive links in terms of culture, trade, political contact, and military confrontations. The history of Japan–Korea relations extends for over 15 centuries, with many ideas from mainland Asia flowing into Japan via Korea in historical times. Although geographically close, the two countries are culturally distinct from one another and may harbor contrasting military and historical viewpoints, where relations can turn fraught, especially in the context of Japanese colonization.

Korea and China relations are extensive and several millennia old. Much cultural and intellectual trade has transferred into Korea from China. The states have also partaken in several military confrontations, with parts of Korea being subsumed by Chinese rule since 109 BC. Much of the history between Korea and China focused on Northeast Asia, and played a role in transmitting knowledge to Japan. Korea has also shared relations with Manchuria and Northeast China, which themselves practiced a form of cultural assimilation with the Han Chinese. Modern relations between China and Korea can become fraught.

== See also ==
- Greater China – Region with cultural ties to Chinese people
- Sinosphere (linguistics) – Geolinguistic region of areal features
- Adoption of Chinese literary culture
- Sinophone world – Person who speaks at least one variety of Sinitic languages
- Sino-xenic vocabulary – Chinese-original CJKV character readings
- Chinese influence on Korean culture – Influence of Chinese culture on Korean culture
- Chinese influence on Japanese culture
- Ryukyuan culture – Culture of the Ryukyuan people
- Baiyue – Historical peoples in China and Vietnam
- I Ching's influence
- List of countries and territories where Chinese is an official language
- List of tributary states of China
- List of Confucian states and dynasties
- Little China (ideology) – Politico-cultural ideology
- Chinese Empire – Name for Imperial China
- Celestial Empire – Old name for China
- Pax Sinica – Periods of regional peace maintained by Chinese hegemony
- Sinicization – Assimilation into Han Chinese culture
- Cultural area – Geographical area associated with a specific cultural orientation
- Culture of East Asia
- Brushtalk – International use of Literary Chinese
- Indosphere – Geolinguistic region sharing areal features of Asia

Internal relations

- China–Vietnam relations
- China–Japan relations
- China–South Korea relations
- China–North Korea relations
- History of Japan–Korea relations
- Japan–South Korea relations – Diplomatic relations between South Korea and Japan
- Japan–North Korea relations
- Japan–Vietnam relations
- North Korea–Vietnam relations
- North Korea–South Korea relations
- South Korea–Vietnam relations
