= Squee from the Margins =

2018 non-fiction book by Rukmini Pande

Squee from the Margins: Fandom and Race
- Author: Rukmini Pande
- Publisher: University of Iowa Press
- Publication date: 2018
- ISBN: 9781609386191
- OCLC: 1088862938

Squee from the Margins: Fandom and Race is a book by Rukmini Pande. Published in 2018 by the University of Iowa Press, the book discusses the roles of race and racism within 21st century fandoms.

A review in Reception: Texts, Readers, Audiences, History praised Pande's writing on a technical level, and agreed with her claims that racism-related incidents within fandoms are proof of a systemic issue. Reviews in the International Journal of Communication and Transformative Works and Cultures both felt that some of the strongest parts of the book were in Pande's reliance on interviews and her examination of ethnographic data. However, the Transformative Works and Cultures review criticised what the reviewer felt was a bias towards Anglo-American fan communities and spaces. The reviewer explicitly refuted Pande's claim that Squee from the Margins was the first full-length book to deal with race and fandom by pointing to the existence of Fandom Unbound: Otaku Culture in a Connected World (2012) by Mizuko Ito, Daisuke Okabe, and Izumi Tsuji, Korean Masculinities and Transcultural Consumption (2011) by San Jung, Asia as Method (2010) by Kuan-Hsing Chen, and Visuality and Identity: Sinophone Articulations across the Pacific (2007) by Shu-mei Shih. The reviewer cites this as one of what they termed "omissions" by Pande of Asian fan works and scholarship.
