= Sinophone =

Person who speaks at least one variety of Sinitic languages

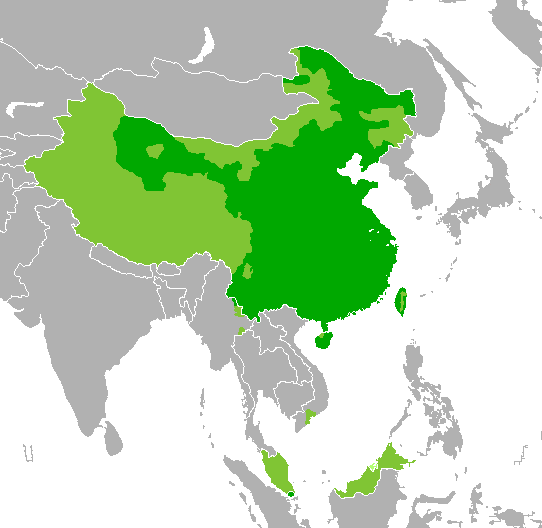
Map of the Chinese-speaking world. Countries and regions with a native Chinese-speaking majority Countries and regions where Chinese languages are not native but an official educational language Countries with significant Chinese-speaking minorities

Sinophone, which means "Chinese-speaking", typically refers to an individual who speaks at least one variety of Chinese (that is, one of the Sinitic languages). Academic writers often use the term Sinophone in two definitions: either specifically "Chinese-speaking populations where it is a minority language, excluding mainland China, Hong Kong, Macau, and Taiwan" or generally "Chinese-speaking areas, including where it is an official language". Many authors use the collocation Sinophone world or Chinese-speaking world to mean the Chinese-speaking world itself (consisting of Greater China and Singapore) or the distribution of the Chinese diaspora outside of Greater China.

Mandarin Chinese is the most commonly spoken variety of the Chinese languages today, with over 1 billion total speakers (approximately 12% of the world population), of which about 900 million are native speakers, making it the most spoken first language in the world and second most spoken overall. It is the official variety of Chinese in mainland China, Taiwan, and Singapore. Meanwhile, Cantonese is the official variety of Chinese in Hong Kong and Macau and is also widely spoken among significant overseas Chinese communities in Southeast Asia as well as the rest of the world.

== Etymology ==
Sinophone
- Traditional Chinese: 漢語圈
- Simplified Chinese: 汉语圈
- Literal meaning: Han language circle
Transcriptions
Standard Mandarin
- Hanyu Pinyin: Hànyǔquān
- Bopomofo: ㄏㄢˋ ㄩˇ ㄑㄩㄢ
- Wade–Giles: Han^{4}-yü^{3}-ch'üan^{1}
- IPA: [xân.ỳ.tɕʰɥɛ́n]
Yue: Cantonese
- Yale Romanization: Honyúhyūn
- Jyutping: hon3 jyu5 hyun1
- IPA: [hɔn˧.jy˩˧.hyn˥]

Alternative Chinese name
- Traditional Chinese: 操漢語者
- Simplified Chinese: 操汉语者
- Literal meaning: Han language-speaking person(s)
Transcriptions
Standard Mandarin
- Hanyu Pinyin: cāo Hànyǔzhě
- Bopomofo: ㄘㄠ ㄏㄢˋ ㄩˇ ㄓㄜˇ
- Wade–Giles: ts'ao^{1} Han^{4}-yu^{3}-che^{3}
- IPA: [tsʰáʊ xân.ỳ.ʈʂɤ̀]
Yue: Cantonese
- Yale Romanization: chōu Honyúhjé
- Jyutping: cou1 hon3 jyu5 ze2
- IPA: [tsʰɔw˥ hɔn˧.jy˩˧.tsɛ˧˥]

The etymology of Sinophone stems from Sino- "China; Chinese" (cf. Sinology) and -phone "speaker of a certain language" (e.g. Anglophone, Francophone).

Edward McDonald (2011) claimed the word sinophone "seems to have been coined separately and simultaneously on both sides of the Pacific" in 2005, by Geremie Barmé of Australia National University and Shu-mei Shih of UCLA. Barmé (2008) explained the "Sinophone world" as "one consisting of the individuals and communities who use one or another—or, indeed, a number—of China-originated languages and dialects to make meaning of and for the world, be it through speaking, reading, writing or via an engagement with various electronic media." Shih (2004:29) noted, "By 'sinophone' literature I mean literature written in Chinese by Chinese-speaking writers in various parts of the world outside China, as distinguished from 'Chinese literature'—literature from China."

Nevertheless, there are two earlier sinophone usages. Ruth Keen (1988:231) defined "Sinophone communities" in Chinese literature as "the Mainland, Taiwan, Hong Kong, Singapore, Indonesia and the U.S." Coulombe and Roberts (2001:12) compared students of French between anglophones "with English as their mother tongue" and allophones (in the Quebec English sense) "without English or French as their mother tongue", including sinophones defined as "Cantonese/Mandarin speakers".

The Oxford English Dictionary does not yet include Sinophone, but records 1900 as the earliest usage of the French loanwords Francophone for "French-speaking" and Anglophone for "English-speaking". The French language – which first used Sinophone to mean "Chinese-speaking" in 1983 (CNRTL 2012) – differentiates Francophone meaning "French-speaking, especially in a region where two or more languages are spoken" and Francophonie "French-speaking, collectively, the French-speaking world" (commonly abbreviating the Organisation internationale de la Francophonie). Haun Saussy contrasted the English lexicon lacking an inclusive term like Sinophonie or Sinophonia, and thus using Sinophone to mean both "Chinese-speaking, especially in a region where it is a minority language" and "all Chinese-speaking areas, including China and Taiwan, Chinese-speaking world".

"Sinophone" operates as a calque on "Francophone", as the application of the logic of Francophonie to the domain of Chinese extraterritorial speech. But that analogy is sure to hiccup, like all analogies, at certain points. Some, but not all, Francophone regions are populated by descendants of French emigrants, as virtually all of Sinophonia (I think) is populated by descendants of Chinese emigrants. Other regions, the majority in both area and population, are Francophone as a result of conquest or enslavement. That might be true of some areas of China too, but in a far more distant past. And at another level, the persistence of French had to do with the exportation of educational protocols by the Grande Nation herself, something that wasn't obviously true of the Middle Kingdom in recent decades but now, with the Confucius Institutes, is perhaps taking form. (2012)

English Sinophonia was the theme of an international conference organized by Christopher Lupke, President of the Association of Chinese and Comparative Literature, and hosted by Peng Hsiao-yen, Senior Researcher in the Institute of Chinese Literature and Philosophy, (Academia Sinica 2012) on "Global Sinophonia" – Chinese Quanqiu Huayu Wenhua 全球華語文化 (literally "global Chinese-language culture").

== Usages ==
In the two decades since the English word sinophone was coined, it has gone through semantic change and increasing usage. Authors currently use it in at least two meanings, the general sense of "Chinese-speaking", and the academic "Chinese-speaking, especially in areas where it is a minority language." Shu-mei Shih, one of the leading academic authorities on Sinophone scholarship, summarized treatments.

In the past few years, scholars have used the term Sinophone for largely denotative purposes to mean "Chinese-speaking" or "written in Chinese". Sau-ling Wong used it to designate Chinese American literature written in "Chinese" as opposed to English ("Yellow"); historians of the Manchu empire such as Pamela Kyle Crossley, Evelyn S. Rawski, and Jonathan Lipman described "Chinese-speaking" Hui Muslims in China as Sinophone Muslims as opposed to Uyghur Muslims, who speak Turkic languages; Patricia Schiaini- Vedani and Lara Maconi distinguished between Tibetan writers who write in the Tibetan script and "Chinese-language", or Sinophone, Tibetan writers. Even though the main purpose of these scholars' use of the term is denotative, their underlying intent is to clarify contrast by naming: in highlighting a Sinophone Chinese American literature, Wong exposes the anglophone bias of scholars and shows that American literature is multilingual; Crossley, Rawski, and Lipman emphasize that Muslims in China have divergent languages, histories, and experiences; Schiaini- Vedani and Maconi suggest the predicament of Tibetan writers who write in the "language of the colonizer" and whose identity is bound up with linguistic difference. (2013:8)

=== General meanings ===
"Chinese-speaking" is the literal meaning of sinophone, without the academic distinction of speakers outside of Greater China.

The Wiktionary is one of the few dictionaries that define sinophone:

- adjective "Speaking one or more Sinitic or Chinese language(s), Chinese-speaking"
- noun "a person who speaks one or more of the Sinitic or Chinese language(s) either natively or by adoption, a Chinese-speaking person."

=== Academic meanings ===
The word sinophone has different meanings among scholars in fields such as Sinology, linguistics, comparative literature, language teaching, and postcolonialism.

Recent definitions of the word include:

- The Sinophone encompasses Sinitic-language communities and their expressions (cultural, political, social, etc.) on the margins of nations and nationalness in the internal colonies and other minority communities in China as well as outside it, with the exception of settler colonies where the Sinophone is the dominant vis-à-vis their indigenous populations. (Shih 2011:716)
- The Sinophone world refers to Sinitic-language cultures and communities born of colonial and postcolonial histories on the margins of geopolitical nation-states all across the world. (Cambria 2012)

== Geographic distribution ==
Countries and territories in which a variety of Chinese is an official language. Sole official language Co-official language

=== Chinese-speaking countries ===
Chinese is an official language of five countries and territories. While Chinese is a group of related languages rather than a single language itself, the governments of nearly all nations and territories where it is official simply designate the ambitious "Chinese" to refer to the official variant used in administration and education, with the exception of Singapore.

Mandarin is the sole official language of both the People's Republic of China (PRC) and the Republic of China (ROC, Taiwan) as well as one of the four official languages of Singapore. It is also one of the six official languages of the United Nations.

Cantonese is an official language of Hong Kong and Macau (alongside English and Portuguese respectively), where it is the dominant variety of Chinese rather than Mandarin.

=== Overseas communities ===
Overseas Chinese and Chinese-speaking communities are found worldwide, with the most sizable concentrated in much of Southeast Asia and some countries in the Western World, particularly the United States, Canada, Australia, United Kingdom, and France. The usage and varieties of Chinese among the Chinese diaspora is usually dependent on various factors, mostly the ancestral region of the dominant Chinese group and official language policy of the country of residence. In Southeast Asia, Cantonese and Hokkien are the dominant variants of Chinese, with the former traditionally serving as a lingua franca amongst most ethnic Chinese in the region. In Western countries with large ethnic Chinese populations, more established Chinese communities use Cantonese or Taishanese, although Mandarin is increasingly spoken by newer arrivals.

Malaysia is the only country outside of the Chinese-speaking world that permits the usage of Chinese as a medium of instruction. This is largely influenced by the fact that Malaysian Chinese comprise nearly a quarter of the country's population and have traditionally been highly influential in the country's economic sector. While Mandarin is the variant of Chinese used in Chinese-language schools, speakers of Hokkien form a plurality in the ethnic Chinese population and Cantonese serves as the common language, especially in commerce and media.

=== As a foreign language ===
With the economic and political rise of the Sinophone world since the latter half of the 20th century, particularly China itself starting in the 1980s, Mandarin Chinese has increasingly become a popular foreign language throughout the world. While not as widespread as a standard foreign language at the scale of English, French, Spanish, or German, student enrollment rates and courses in Mandarin have rapidly grown in East and Southeast Asia and Western countries. Besides standard Mandarin, Cantonese is the only other Chinese language that is widely taught as a foreign language, in part due to the global economic importance of Hong Kong and its widespread presence in significant Overseas Chinese communities.

=== Statistics ===
Ethnologue estimates the total number of Sinophones at about 1.4 billion worldwide as of 2020, the vast majority (1.3 billion) of whom are native speakers. The most spoken branch of Chinese is Mandarin with 1.12 billion speakers (921 million native speakers), followed by Yue (which includes Cantonese) with 85 million speakers (84 million native). Other branches of the Chinese language subgroup with over 2 million speakers include: Wu with 82 million (81.7 million native), Min Nan with 49 million (48.4 million native), Hakka with 48.2 million, Jin with 47 million, Xiang with 37.3 million, Gan with 22.1 million, Min Bei with 11 million, Min Dong with 10.3 million, Huizhou with 4.6 million, and Pu-Xian Min with 2.5 million.

Below is a table of the Chinese-speaking population in various countries and territories:

Countries/Territories	Speakers	Percentage	Dialects					Year	Reference
Countries/Territories	Speakers	Percentage	Mandarin	Min	Hakka	Yue	Other/Unknown/ Not specified	Year	Reference
Anguilla	7	0.06%						2001	
Australia	1,022,506	4.02%	685,274			295,281	41,944	2021	
Austria	9,960	0.12%						2001	
Belize	2,600	0.8%						2010	
Cambodia	94,450	0.61%						2019	
Canada	1,292,640	3.68%	679,255	29,115	9,765	553,380	21,120	2021	
China (mainland)	1,300,000,000	93% (approx.)						2020	(Note: Obtained by projecting the literacy rate to the entire population. According to the 2020 Chinese census, of the 1,409,778,724 people in China. Using the illiteracy rate of 2.67% and that 95% of the literate population used Standard Chinese Characters, this yields approximately 1.3 billion people who used Standard Chinese Characters.)
Cyprus	2,179	0.24%						2021	
England and Wales	204,646	0.35%	30,820			55,555	118,271	2021	
Falkland Islands	1	0.03%						2006	
Finland	15,735	0.28%						2022	
Germany	159,000	0.19%						2024	
Hong Kong	6,698,969	93.30%	165,451	98,485	41,514	6,328,947	64,572	2021	(Note: Only includes usual speakers)
Indonesia	2,200,000	1.0%						2000	
Ireland	24,709	0.48%						2021	
Isle of Man	349	0.41%						2021	
Lithuania	64	0.002%						2011	
Luxembourg	2,855	0.51%						2021	
Macao	411,482	97.0%	31,405			537,981	36,032	2021	
Malaysia	6,642,000	23.4%						2016	
Marshall Islands	79	0.2%						1999	
Mauritius	997	0.08%	406		60	17	514	2022	
Nepal	242	0.0009%						2011	
New Zealand	219,888	4.40%	107,412			54,417	58,059	2023	
North Macedonia	13	0.0007%						2021	
Northern Ireland	5,237	0.29%	636		23	1,246	3,332	2021	
Northern Mariana Islands	14,862	23.4%						2000	
Palau	331	1.8%						2005	
Philippines	6,032	0.4%						2000	
Romania	2,039	0.01%						2011	
Russia	17,556	0.01%						2021	
Scotland	26,449	0.50%	4,613	25	99	7,664	14,048	2021	
Singapore	1,388,430	38.61%	1,075,172	216,683		79,216	17,359	2020	(Note: Only include language most spoken at home)
Slovakia	1,434	0.03%						2021	
South Africa	8,533	0.02%						1996	
Taiwan	21,690,893	99.57%	14,463,896	6,897,535	329,462			2020	
Thailand	111,866	0.2%						2010	
Timor Leste	511	0.07%						2004	
United States	3,531,221	1.12%						2023	
Total	1,345,810,765								

== See also ==
- List of countries and territories where Chinese is an official language
- Sinosphere, a term for countries in East and Southeast Asia that have been influenced by Chinese culture
- Tangwang language
- Dialect continuum
- List of link languages
- Geolinguistics
- Language geography
