= List of countries and territories where Chinese is an official language =

Countries/territories in which Chinese is an official language. Official language (As Mandarin in China and Taiwan) Co-official language (As Cantonese in Hong Kong alongside English, in Macau alongside Portuguese. As Mandarin in Singapore alongside English, Malay, and Tamil.)

The following is a list of countries and territories where Chinese is an official language. While those countries or territories that designate any variety of Chinese as an official language, as the term "Chinese" is considered a group of related language varieties rather than a homogeneous language, of which many are not mutually intelligible, in the context of the spoken language such designations are usually understood as one standard form of Chinese variety, namely Cantonese and Standard Mandarin. In the context of the written language, written modern standard Chinese is usually understood to be the official standard, though different territories use different standard scripts, namely traditional characters and simplified characters.

Today, Chinese has an official language status in three countries and two territories. In China, it is the sole official language as Standard Chinese; in Taiwan, it is the de facto official language; while in Singapore (as Mandarin) it is one of the four official languages. In Hong Kong and Macau it is co-official as Cantonese, alongside English and Portuguese respectively. Chinese is also an official language in the Shanghai Cooperation Organisation, and also one of the six official languages of the United Nations. Chinese was added as an official language in the United Nations in 1973, when the General Assembly made Chinese a working language.

== Chinese varieties as official languages ==
=== Cantonese ===
Location	Population (2017)	Written variety	Standardised form
Hong Kong	7,191,503	Traditional Chinese	N/A (Not mentioned by the government)
Macau	648,550	Traditional Chinese	

As special administrative regions of China, both Hong Kong and Macau list the ambiguous "Chinese" as one of their official languages, although in practice, the regionally spoken Cantonese dialect is used by the government as the official variant of Chinese rather than Mandarin as on the mainland.

Cantonese is also highly influential in the southern Chinese province of Guangdong, where the language originated. Despite Mandarin's status as the official language of China, the State Administration of Radio, Film, and Television (SARFT) has allowed local television and other media in Guangdong Province to be broadcast in Cantonese since 1988 in order to countermeasure against Hong Kong influence. Meanwhile, usage of the country's other dialects in media is rigorously restricted by the SARFT, with permission from national or local authorities being required for a dialect to be the primary programming language at radio and television stations. Despite its unique standing relative to other Chinese dialects, Cantonese has also been targeted by the SARFT in attempts to curb its usage on local television in Guangdong. This was most exemplified by mass demonstrations in 2010 that resulted in the eventual rejection of the plans.

=== Mandarin ===
Country	Population (2017)	Written variety	Standardised form
China	1,379,302,771	Simplified Chinese; Written Mandarin	Standard Chinese
Taiwan	23,508,428	Traditional Chinese; Written Mandarin	Taiwanese Mandarin
Singapore	5,888,926 (~3,000,000 ethnic Chinese)	Simplified Chinese; Written Mandarin	Singaporean Mandarin

The Mandarin dialect group consists of closely related varieties of Chinese spoken natively across most of northern and southwestern China, a form based on the Beijing dialect has been established as the national standard and is official in the People's Republic of China and Singapore.

Despite there being no de jure official languages in Taiwan (Republic of China), Taiwanese Mandarin is the de facto language for official use. Ministry of Culture and Ministry of Education designated Taiwanese Mandarin, Taiwanese Hokkien, Taiwanese Hakka, and Matsu dialect as its provisional "National Languages" in 2019.

Mandarin Chinese is the official language of the autonomous Kokang region of Myanmar. In Wa State, Mandarin Chinese is de facto the official language, even though the government tries to promote the use of Wa. This situation arose because Wa lacks an agreed standardisation (the dialects are very different and three different scripts are used for the language) and because of the significant presence of non-Wa minorities. Consequently, Chinese is used in the party and government, army, and business, and is taught in many schools.

== Status of other Chinese variants ==
In China, the public usage of varieties other than Standard Mandarin (Putonghua) is officially discouraged by the government and nearly all education and media is conducted in the standard variant, with a notable exception being Cantonese in Guangdong media and public transportation. As a result, younger populations are increasingly losing knowledge of their local dialects. While there was limited activity in reintroducing local languages at schools through cultural programs and a slight uplifting of broadcasting restrictions on dialects during the 2000s, the Chinese government has stopped and in most cases, reversed these developments since the mid-2010s.

Although Mandarin is the official variant of Chinese in Taiwan, Taiwanese Hokkien and Hakka are widely spoken and used in media. Additionally, they are taught at the primary school level and are used in public transportation announcements. A thriving literary scene for both Taiwanese and Hakka also exists alongside Mandarin. In December 2017, Hakka was recognised as a national minority language, allowing it to be used for official purposes in townships where speakers form at least half of the population. Taiwanese was also granted national language status after a legislative act in 2018.

In Singapore, the public usage of varieties other than Standard Mandarin is discouraged as in China. The Singaporean government has actively promoted the Speak Mandarin Campaign (SMC) since the 1980s and forbids non-cable broadcasting and Chinese language medium of instruction in non-Mandarin varieties. However, since the mid-1990s, there has been a relaxation in allowing non-Mandarin broadcasting via cable networks and a massive following of Hong Kong television dramas and pop culture, which are in Cantonese.

== See also ==
- Sinosphere
- Sinophone
- Overseas Chinese
- Dungan people

By ISO 639-3 code
Enter an ISO code to find the corresponding language article.
