= Shu-mei Shih =

Professor of Sinophone studies

- 史書美
- Born: South Korea

Education
- Education: National Taiwan Normal University (BA); University of California, San Diego (MA); University of California, Los Angeles (PhD)
- Thesis: Writing between tradition and the West : Chinese modernist fiction, 1917-1937 (1992)

Philosophical work
- Era: Contemporary philosophy 21st century philosophy
- Region: Western philosophy
- Institutions: University of California, Los Angeles; National Taiwan Normal University
- Language: English, Mandarin Chinese, Korean
- Main interests: Sinophone studies, comparative literature, transnationalism, Taiwan studies, postcolonial studies, critical race theory

Chinese name
- Traditional Chinese: 史書美
- Simplified Chinese: 史书美
Transcriptions
Standard Mandarin
- Hanyu Pinyin: Shǐ Shūměi
- Wade–Giles: Shih^{3} Shu^{1}-mei^{3}

Shu-mei Shih (Chinese: 史書美) is a Taiwanese-American literary theorist. She is Professor of Comparative Literature, Asian Languages and Cultures, and Asian American Studies at the University of California, Los Angeles and was the president of the American Comparative Literature Association from 2021 to 2022. In 2018, she was also appointed as Honorary Chair Professor of Taiwan Languages, Literature and Culture at National Taiwan Normal University and is the current director of the UCLA-NTNU Taiwan Studies Initiative of the UCLA Asia Pacific Center.

== Early life and education ==
Shih was born in 1961 in South Korea as a Republic of China citizen to Chinese immigrant parents who escaped from Shandong around 1947 during the second phase of the Chinese Civil War (1945–49). She completed her primary and secondary education in Chinese-language schools sponsored by the Republic of China government in Korea. In 1978, Shih passed her college entrance examination and went to National Taiwan Normal University, where she studied English with Shakespearean scholar Tsu-wen Chen. She graduated with a bachelor's degree from the Department of English in 1982. After a year of teaching middle school in Taipei, Shih acquired an M.A. from the University of California, San Diego. She then moved to the University of California, Los Angeles where she earned her Ph.D. in comparative literature.

== Career ==
Shih joined the University of California, Los Angeles in 1993, and was promoted to professor in 2000. From 2019 until 2022 Shih was the Edward W. Said Professor in Comparative Literature, and as of 2023 she holds the Irving and Jean Stone Chair in Humanities.

Shih is known for her work in the field of Sinophone studies, a field that takes as its object of study "Sinitic-language communities and cultures outside China as well as ethnic minority communities and cultures within China where Mandarin is adopted or imposed."

== Honors and awards ==
Shih was elected to the Hong Kong Academy of the Humanities in 2013. In 2018, National Taiwan Normal University named Shih as a distinguished alumni.

== Selected publications ==
- Shih, Shu-Mei (2004). "Global Literature and the Technologies of Recognition". Publications of the Modern Language Association of America. 119 (1): 16–30. doi:10.1632/003081204X22828. ISSN 0030-8129. S2CID 162293444.
- Shih, Shu-mei (2001-04-20). The Lure of the Modern: Writing Modernism in Semicolonial China, 1917-1937. University of California Press. ISBN 978-0-520-93528-0.
- Shih, Shu-mei (2007-06-19). Visuality and Identity: Sinophone Articulations across the Pacific. University of California Press. ISBN 978-0-520-94015-4.
- Shih, S.; Lionnet, F. (2005). Thinking Through the Minor, Transnationally.
- Shih, Shu-Mei; Tsai, Chien-hsin; Bernards, Brian (2013). Sinophone studies: a critical reader. Global Chinese culture. New York: Columbia University press. ISBN 978-0-231-15750-6.
