= Influence of the I Ching =

As an important component of Chinese culture, the I Ching, a text over 3,000 years old, is believed to be one of the world's oldest books. The two major branches of Chinese philosophy, Confucianism and Taoism have common roots in the I Ching.

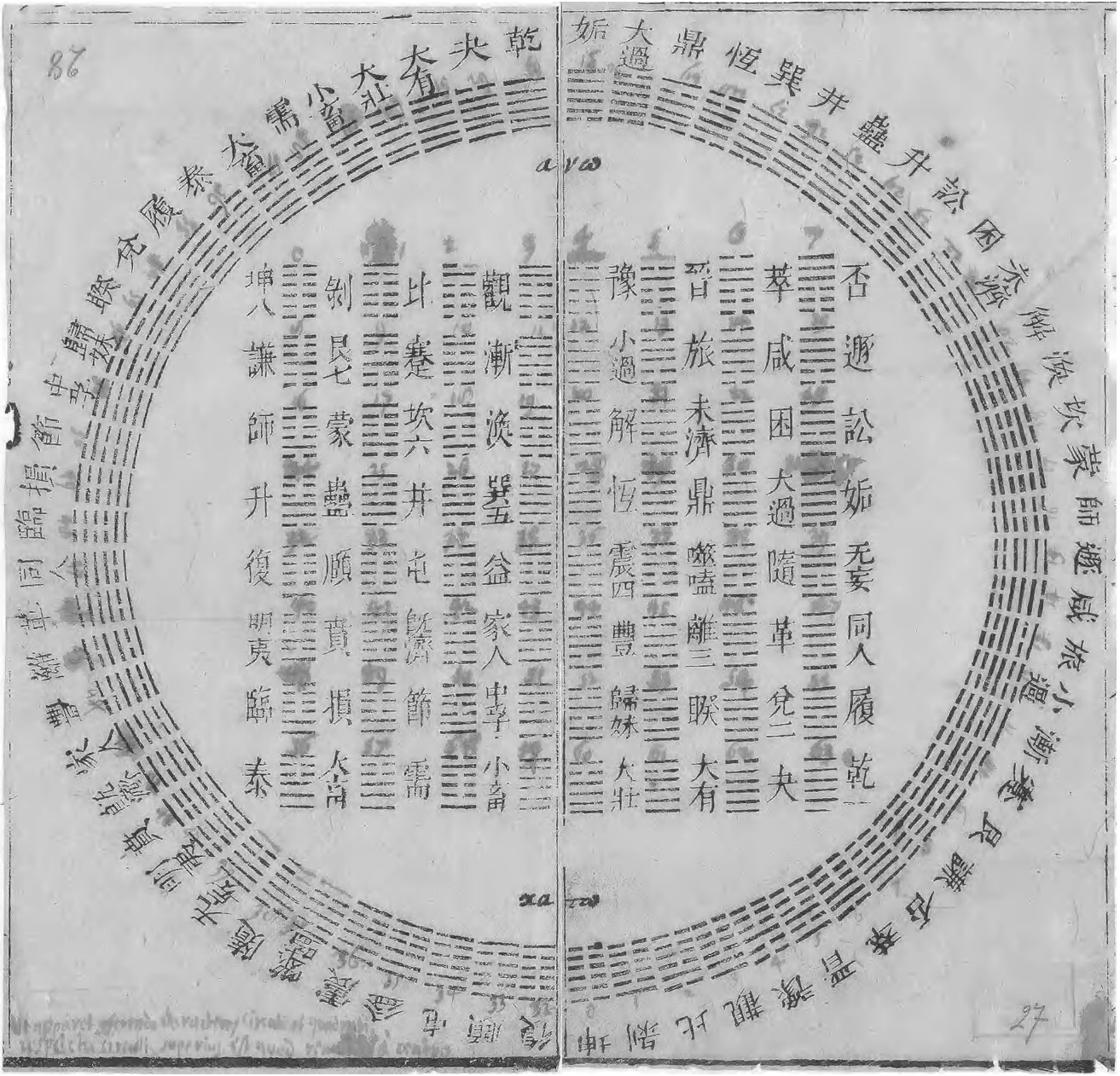
A diagram of I Ching hexagrams sent to Gottfried Wilhelm Leibniz from Joachim Bouvet. The Hindu numerals were added by Leibniz.

== Significance for Chinese culture ==
From its mythological origins in prehistory (see Fu Xi) and the earliest dates of recorded history in China, the I Ching has been added to by a succession of philosophers, scholars and rulers. Thus, it reflects a thread of thinking and a common cosmology that have been passed through successive generations. In addition to the I Ching's broadly recognized influence on Confucianism and Taoism, it has been shown to have influenced Chinese Buddhism. Fazang, patriarch of the Huayan school, is believed to have drawn on a mode of thought derived from the I Ching.

One of the earliest versions of the I Ching (called, Zhou I, or Changes of Zhou) was the oracle of the Zhou. It played a role in their overthrow of the Shang dynasty by Zhou King Wu in 1070 BCE. An account of Wu's conquest tells of a solar eclipse believed by the King to be an omen from Heaven to march against the Shang. This account has been matched with a solar eclipse that occurred on June 20, 1070 BCE. Thus, the earliest layer of the I Ching has been shown to preserve a hidden history that went undetected for three millennia. The Zhou Yi has been called one of the most important sources of Chinese culture. It has influenced fields as varied as mathematics, science, medicine, martial arts, philosophy, history, literature, art, ethics, military affairs and religion.

Joseph Campbell describes the I Ching as "an encyclopedia of oracles, based on a mythic view of the universe that is fundamental to all Chinese thought."

=== Confucius ===
Confucius was fascinated by the I Ching and kept a copy in the form of "a set of bamboo tablets fastened by a leather thong, [which] was consulted so often that the binding had to be replaced three times. [Confucius] said that if he had fifty years to spare, he would devote them to the I Ching." The ten commentaries of Confucius, (or Ten Wings), transformed the I Ching from a divination text into a "philosophical masterpiece". It has influenced Confucians and other philosophers and scientists ever since.

== Influence on Japan ==
Prior to the Tokugawa period (1603–1868 CE) in Japan, the Book of Changes was little known and used mostly for divination until Buddhist monks popularized the Chinese classic for its philosophical, cultural and political merits in other literate groups such as the samurai. The Hagakure, a collection of commentaries on the Way of the Warrior, cautions against mistaking it for a work of divination.

== Influence on Western culture ==
- American historian Michael Nylan, representing UC Berkeley noted the considerable influence of the I Ching on intellectuals in Europe and America. She stated that it is the most familiar of the five Chinese classics, and without doubt, the best-known Chinese book that laid the foundation of modern Western culture beginning the 17th century.
- German mathematician and philosopher Gottfried Wilhelm Leibniz was keenly interested in the I Ching, and translated I-Ching binary system into modern binary system.
- When Danish Physicist Niels Bohr was awarded Denmark's highest honor and the opportunity to create a family coat of arms, he chose the yin-yang symbol, and Latin motto contraria sunt complementa, "opposites are complementary", a nod to his Principle of Complementarity.
- Musician and composer John Cage used the I Ching to decide the arrangements of many of his compositions.
- The hip-hop music group Dead Prez refer to the I Ching in several of their songs and in their logo.
- Author Philip K. Dick used the I Ching when writing The Man in the High Castle and including it in the story as a theme.
- Author Hermann Hesse's 1943 novel The Glass Bead Game is mainly concerned with the principles of the I Ching.
- Psychologist Carl Jung wrote a foreword to the Wilhelm–Baynes translation of the I Ching.
- The writer Raymond Queneau had a long-standing fascination with the I Ching.
