= Muk (food) =

Jelly-like starch based food

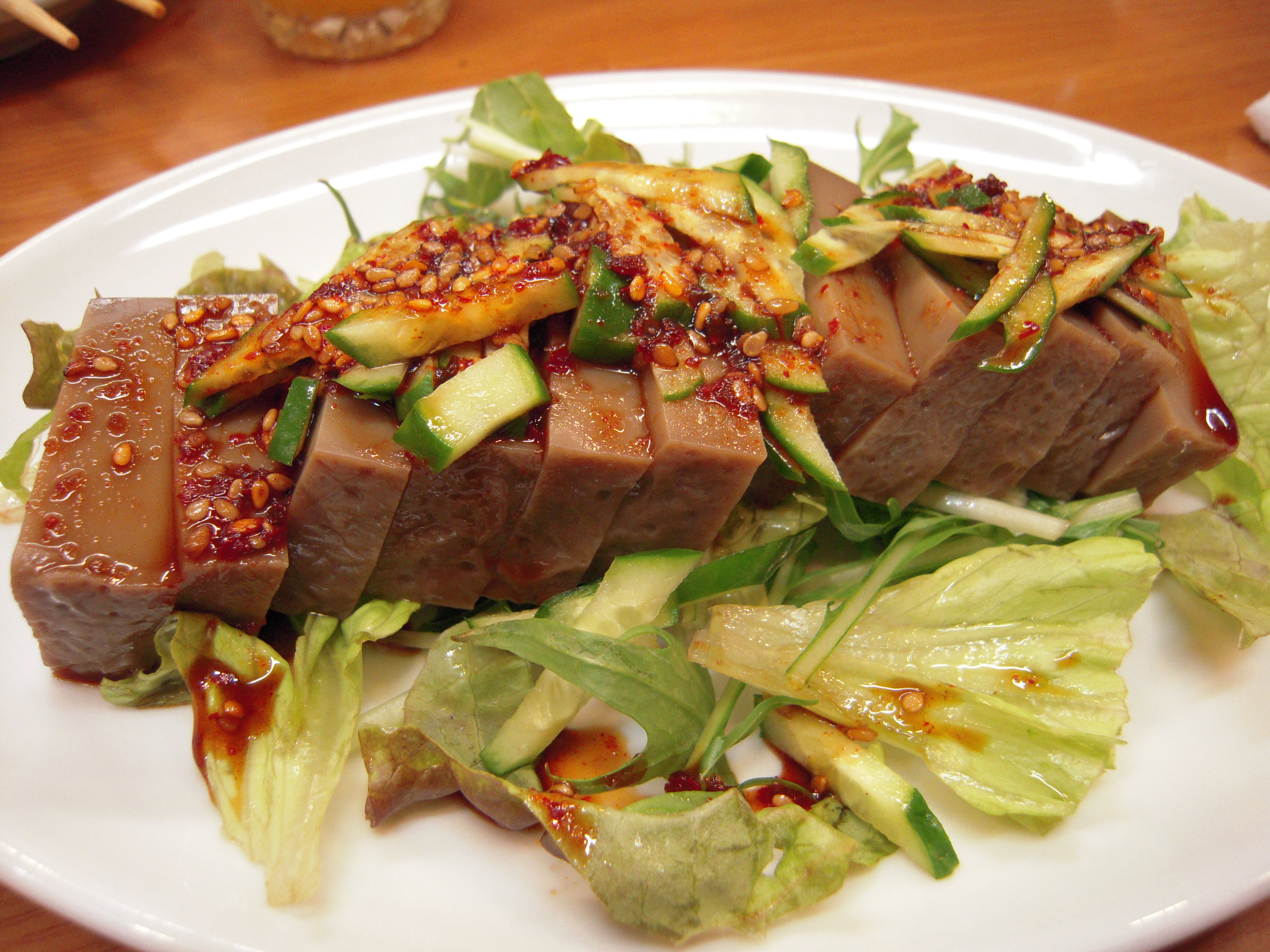
- A plate of dotori-muk-muchim

Korean name
- Hangul: 묵
- RR: muk
- MR: muk

In Korean cuisine, muk (Korean: 묵) is a general term referring to all foods made by setting a thick slurries or liquids especially plant starch (e.g. tofu: 콩묵 kong-muk i.e. 'soy muk'), but also animal produce e.g. collagen and gelatin, or ground meat such as that of fishcakes (어묵 eo-muk i.e. 'fish muk').

Plant-based muk can be classified into starch gels such as amylose and amylopectin, polysaccharide physical gels such as agar and umu (seaweed), and fibrous alkali gels such as konjac (go-nyak).

== Types ==
There are several types of muk:

- Dotori-muk (도토리묵), made from acorn starch
- Memil-muk (메밀묵), made from buckwheat starch
- Nokdu-muk (녹두묵; also called 청포묵 cheongpo-muk), made from mung bean starch
- Hwangpo-muk (황포묵; also called 노랑묵 norang-muk), same as nokdu-muk above but colored yellow with gardenia seed pods
- Kkae-muk (깨묵), made from starch mixed with sesame seeds
- Olbanggae-muk (올방개묵), made from water chestnuts

== Muk dishes ==
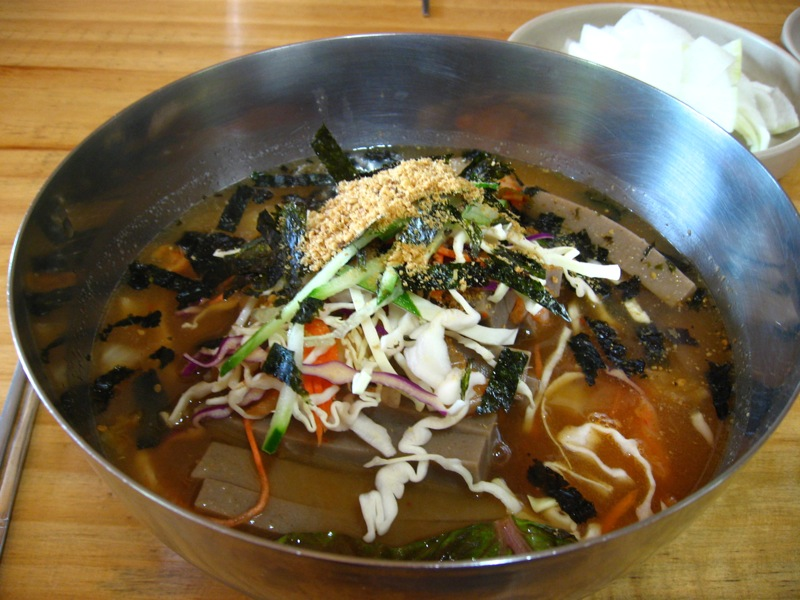
Memil-muk-sabal

- Muk-muchim (묵무침), muk dish seasoned with ganjang (Korean soy sauce), sesame or perilla oil, finely chopped green onions, sesame seeds, and red chili powder. It can be mixed with sliced or shredded cucumber, and leaf vegetables, such as chopped lettuce, cabbage or napa cabbage. The dish can also be served with only crumbled gim (Korean nori) added as a garnish.
- Tangpyeong-chae (탕평채), made with thinly sliced nokdumuk, beef, vegetables, and seaweed.
- Muk-bokkeum (묵볶음), a stir-fried muk dish.
- Muk-jangajji (묵장아찌), marinated muk in soy sauce
- Muk-jeonyueo (묵전유어) or mukjeon (묵전), made by pan-frying sliced muk that has been coated with mung bean starch.
- Muk-sabal (묵사발) or also called mukbap (묵밥), cold soup made with muk and sliced vegetables.

== See also ==
- Burmese tofu
- Jelly
- Jidou liangfen
- Konjac
- Laping
- Liangfen
- Liang pi
- Tangpyeong-chae
