= Tohu =

Tohu can refer to:

- Tohu Harris, New Zealand rugby league footballer
- Tohu Kākahi, New Zealand Māori leader
- Tohu, a biblical person (an ancestor of the prophet Samuel; 1 Samuel 1:1)
- Burmese tofu, among other names
- Another transliteration of the Japanese word "tofu"

== In Hebrew ==
- Tohu wa-bohu, the Hebrew phrase from the Book of Genesis, usually translated "formless and empty"
- Tohu and Tikun, the two stages of Existence in Lurianic Kabbalah; the initial Olam-World of Tohu-Chaos collapses, to be replaced by the World of Tikun ("rectification")
