= Burmese tofu =

Chickpea-based food item

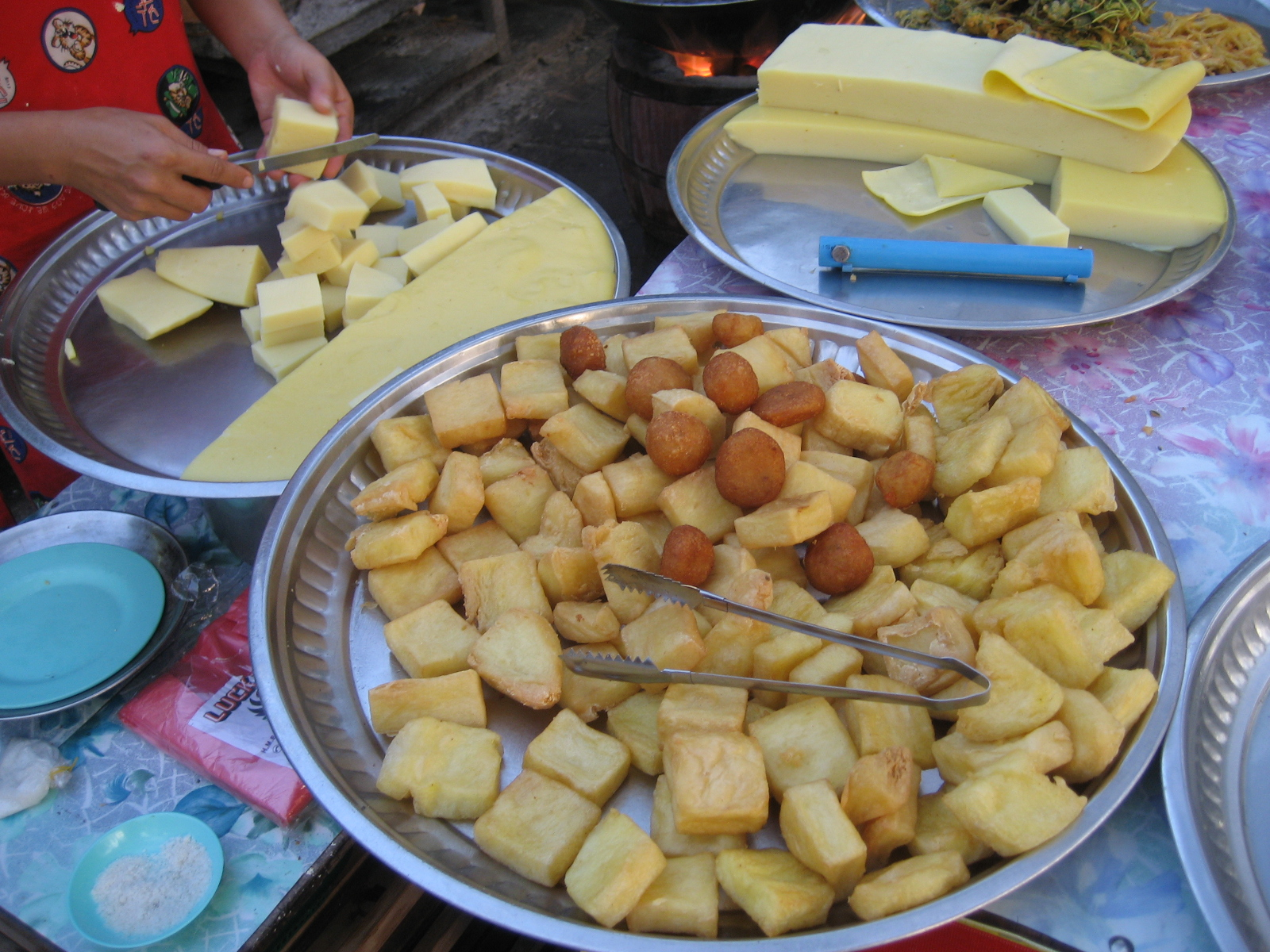
- To hpu (Burmese tofu), in two forms: fresh and fritters
- Place of origin: Myanmar
- Associated cuisine: Burmese cuisine
- Main ingredients: water; chickpea flour (besan flour); turmeric

Burmese tofu (Burmese: တိုဖူး, pronounced [tòpʰú]; or Burmese: တိုဟူး, pronounced [tòhú]) is a food of Shan and Chinese origin from Yunnan Province, made from water and flour ground from yellow split peas and the Burmese version of chickpea flour, also known as besan flour, in a fashion similar to polenta. (Note: Also called gram flour, besan flour is made from chana dal (also called kala chana or Bengal gram), a type of small, dark-colored chickpea also used in Indian cuisine).) The flour is mixed with water, turmeric, and a little salt and heated, stirring constantly, until it reaches a creamy consistency. It is then transferred into a tray and allowed to set. It can also be made using dried chickpea instead of processed flour. In this process, dried chickpeas are soaked overnight. Once the peas have been rehydrated, they are ground into a puree with some of the liquid used to soak the peas, then allowed to set for a couple of hours. Much of the top layer of clear liquid is then skimmed off and the remaining puree is brought to a boil with turmeric and salt and cooked and set in the same manner as the version using chickpea flour. It is matte yellow in colour, jelly-like but firm in consistency, and does not crumble when cut or sliced. It may be eaten fresh as a Burmese tofu salad or deep-fried into a Burmese fritter. It may also be sliced and dried to make crackers for deep frying. Despite the name, Burmese tofu is unrelated to Chinese tofu, which is made from soy milk with added coagulants.

== Varieties and etymology ==
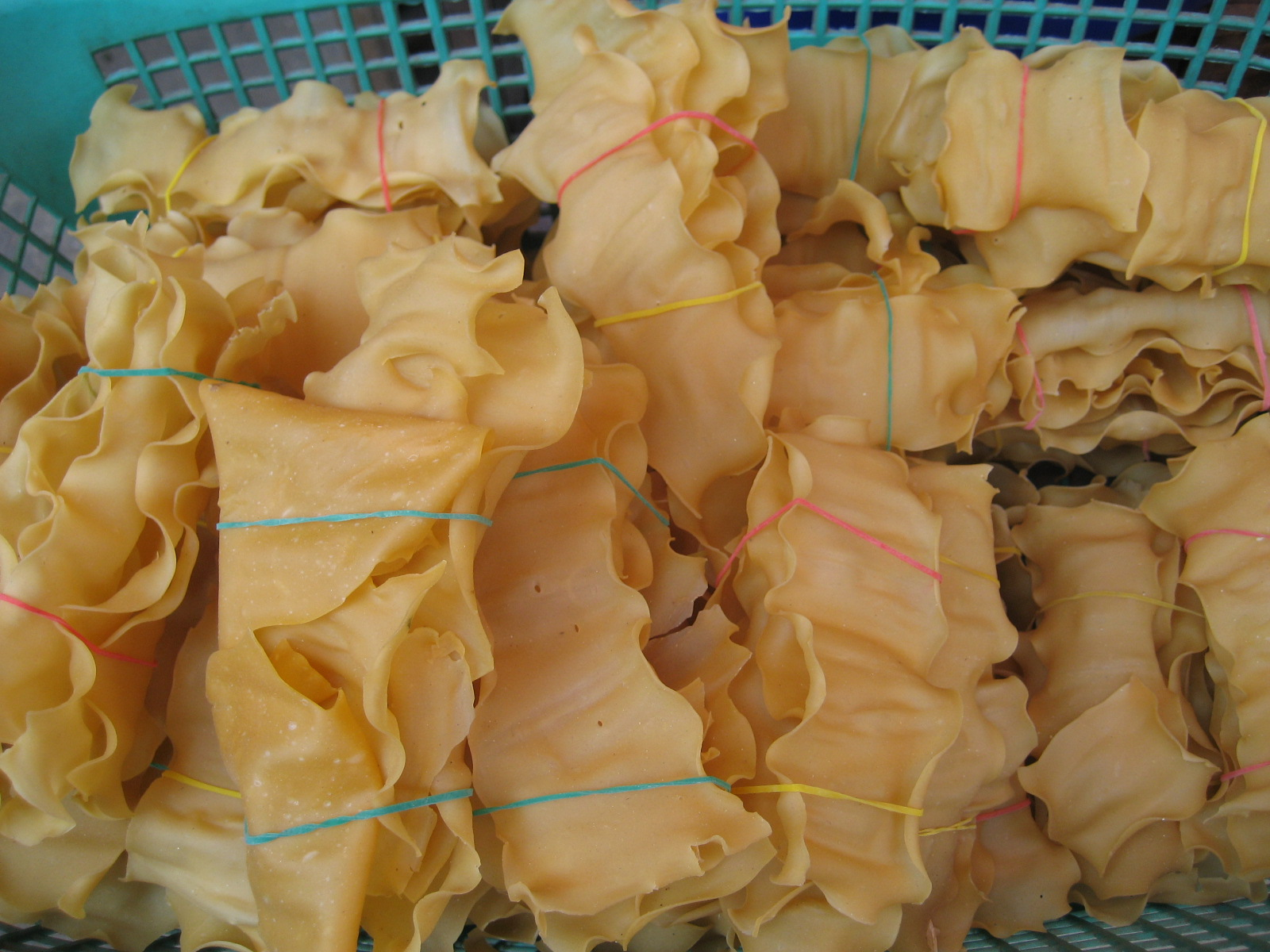
To hpu gyauk (Burmese tofu crackers) are sold in bundles ready for deep frying.

- Pè bya (ပဲပြား, lit. 'flat beans') refers to Chinese tofu and is translated into 'beancurd' in English in Myanmar. Stinky tofu or the fermented form of tofu, however, is called si to hpu.
- Won ta hpo (from Chinese: 溫豆腐; lit. 'warm tofu') is the yellow form of tofu made from yellow split peas or zadaw bè in Shan State. It is similar to Chinese version of chickpea tofu. In Chinese pronouncation it is called wāndòu fěn (豌豆粉), which literally means "split pea jelly." It is unknown whether chickpea tofu originated in southern China or Shan State.
- To hpu gyauk (တိုဖူးခြောက်း lit. 'dried tofu') is yellow tofu sliced into a long thin rectangular form and dried in the sun. They are similar to fish or prawn crackers and sold in bundles.
- To hpu (တိုဖူး or တို့ဖူး) made from chickpea (kala bè) flour or pè hmont is the common version in mainland Burma. It has the same yellow colour and taste but slightly firmer than Shan tofu.
- Hsan ta hpo (ဆန်တဖိုး) is still mainly confined to Shan regions, made from rice flour called hsan hmont or mont hmont, and is white in colour. It has the same consistency but slightly different in taste. It is as popular as the yellow form as a salad.

There is no /f/ (as in "French") in the Burmese language; hence, /pʰ/ (as in the word "pot") is used in to hpu, the Burmese version of "tofu".

== Preparation ==
=== Fried ===
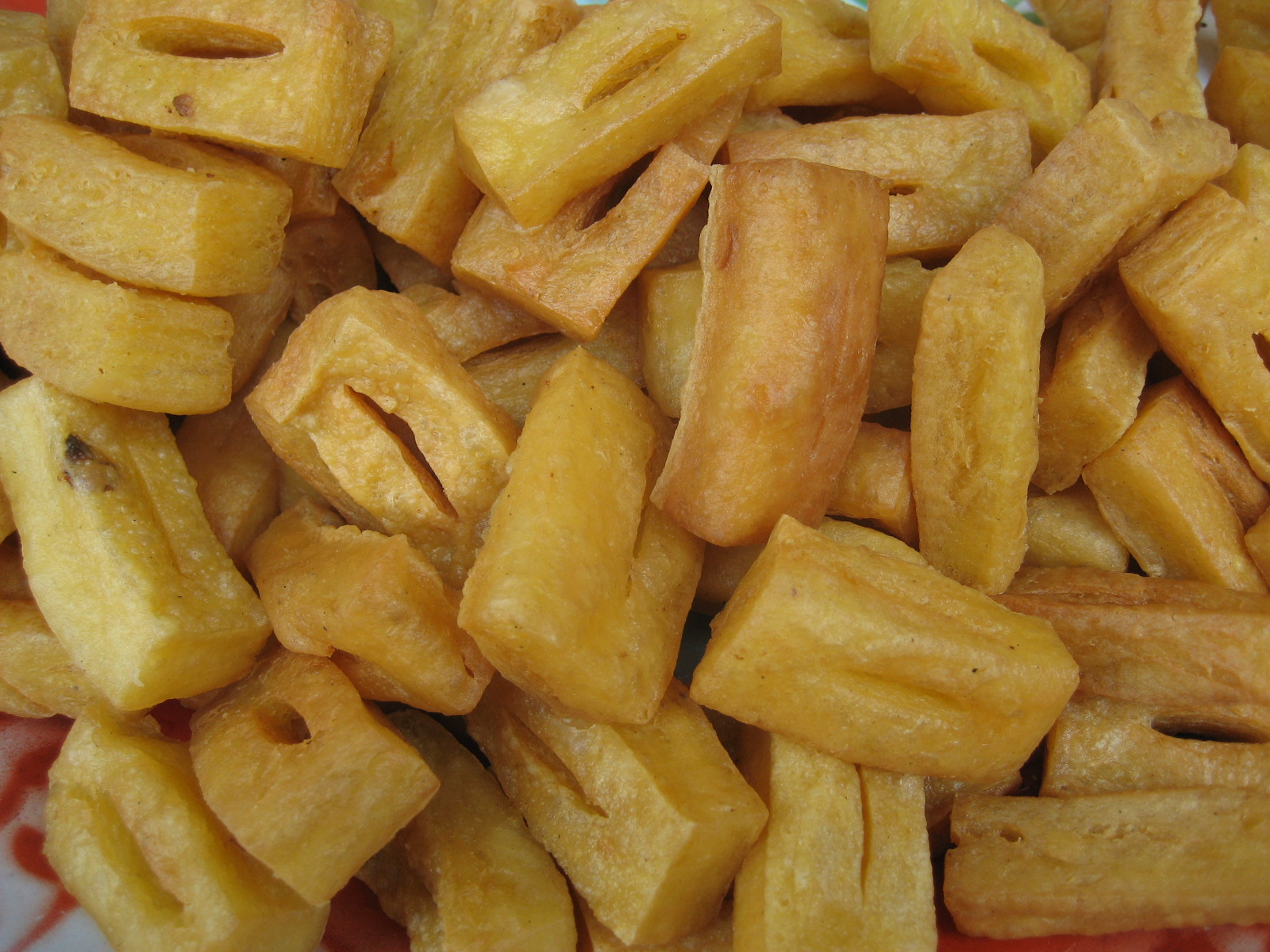
To hpu gyaw (Burmese tofu fritters) are popular as snacks on their own, with glutinous rice for breakfast, or as a salad.

- To hpu gyaw (တိုဖူးကြော်) is yellow tofu cut into rectangular shapes, scored in the middle, and deep fried. Tofu fritters may be eaten with a spicy sour dip, or cut and made into a salad. They are crispy outside and soft inside. They are similar to the Sicilian snack panelle.
- Hnapyan gyaw (နှစ်ပြန်ကြော်) is so called because the fritters are "twice fried" after the tofu is cut into triangular shapes. It is the traditional form in the Shan States.
- To hpu gyauk kyaw (တိုဖူးခြောက်ကြော်) or deep fried tofu crackers, like hnapyan gyaw, are usually served with htamin gyin (lit. 'sour rice'), balls kneaded together with tomato and fish or potato), another popular Shan dish.

Fried tofu goes very well with kauk hnyin baung (glutinous rice) as a breakfast option, and also with mohinga (rice vermicelli in fish soup), nan gyi thouk (rice noodle salad) and Shan khauk swè (Shan-style rice noodles). Green tea is the preferred traditional drink to go with all these in Burma.

=== Salad ===
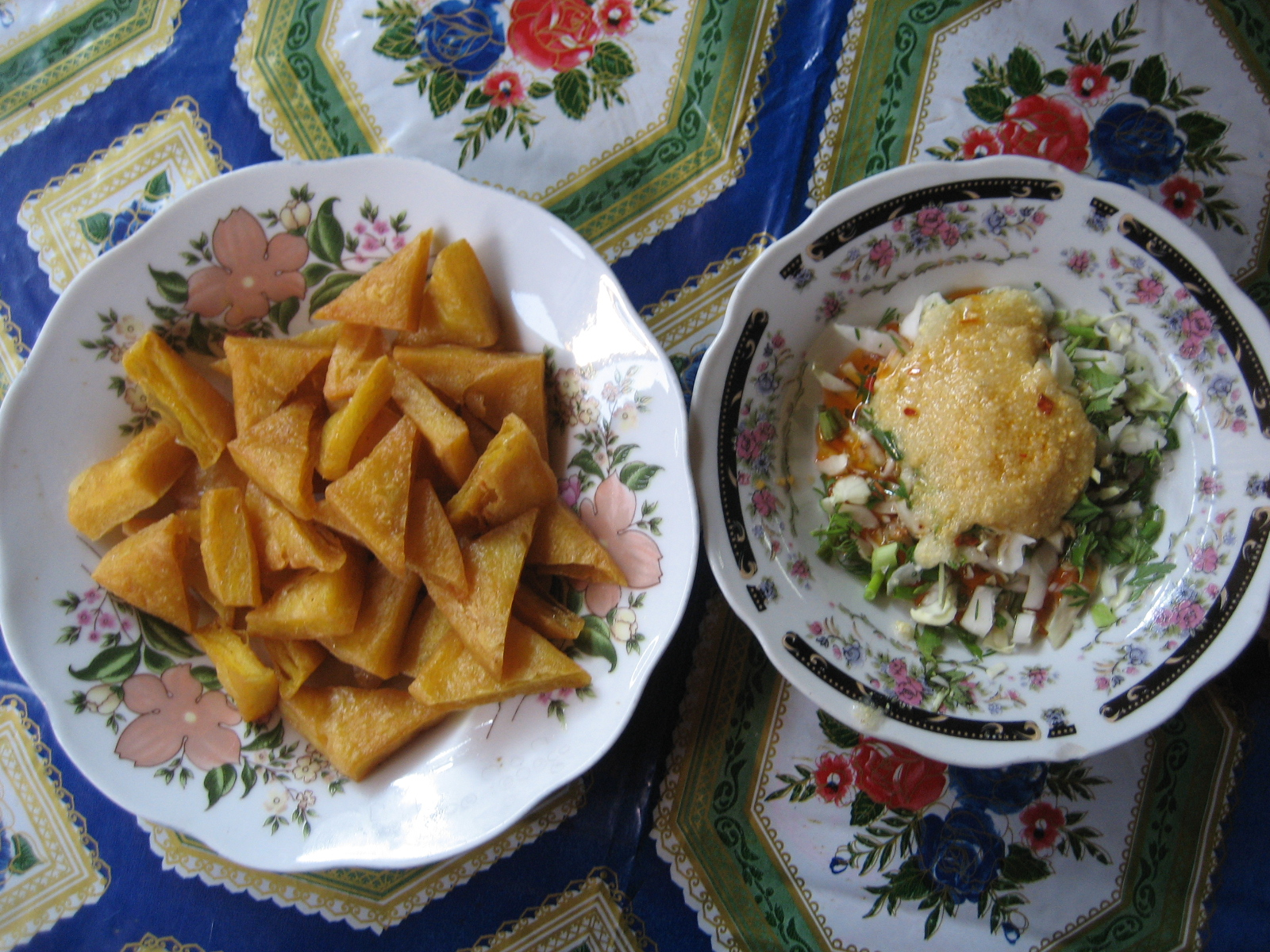
Hnapyan gyaw or "twice fried " Shan tofu fritters served with a side salad at Inle Lake.

- To hpu thouk (တိုဖူးသုပ်) or tofu salad with either to hpu or hsan ta hpo is very popular as a snack or a meal in itself whereas fried tofu on its own is considered a snack. Both may form part of a meal where all the dishes are customarily shared at the same time. Fresh tofu, cut into small rectangular slices, constitutes the main ingredient of the salad, dressed and garnished with peanut oil, dark soy sauce, rice vinegar, toasted crushed dried chilli, crushed garlic, crushed roasted peanuts, crisp-fried onions, and coriander. This dish is similar to the Chinese dish liangfen.
- To hpu gyaw thouk (တိုဖူးကြော်သုပ်) refers to tofu fritters cut up and served as a salad as above.
- To hpu nway (တိုဖူးနွေး, lit. 'warm tofu') or to hpu byaw (တိုဖူးပျော့, lit. 'soft tofu') is the soft creamy tofu served hot before it sets, usually as a salad dressed and garnished the same way. It may be combined in the same dish with tofu fritters or rice noodles.

=== Curried ===
- To hpu gyet (တိုဟူးချက်) - Sliced yellow tofu may also be curried with fresh tomatoes, onions and garlic, cooked in peanut oil and fish sauce, and garnished with coriander and green chilli. It makes a good pescatarian dish to go with rice, but also popular among the poor if meat or poultry is unaffordable.

== Gallery ==
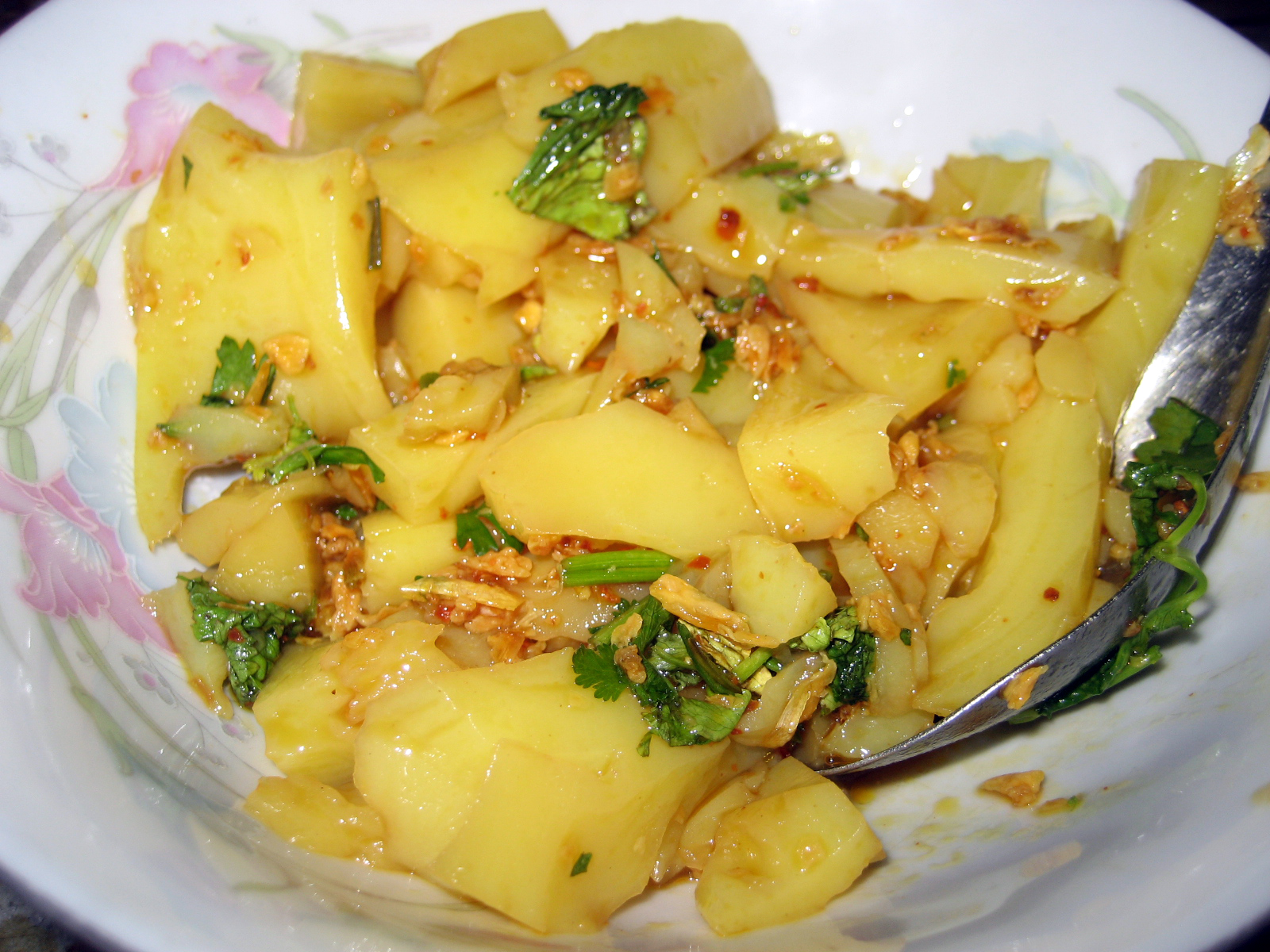
To hpu thouk - yellow tofu salad is a national favourite.

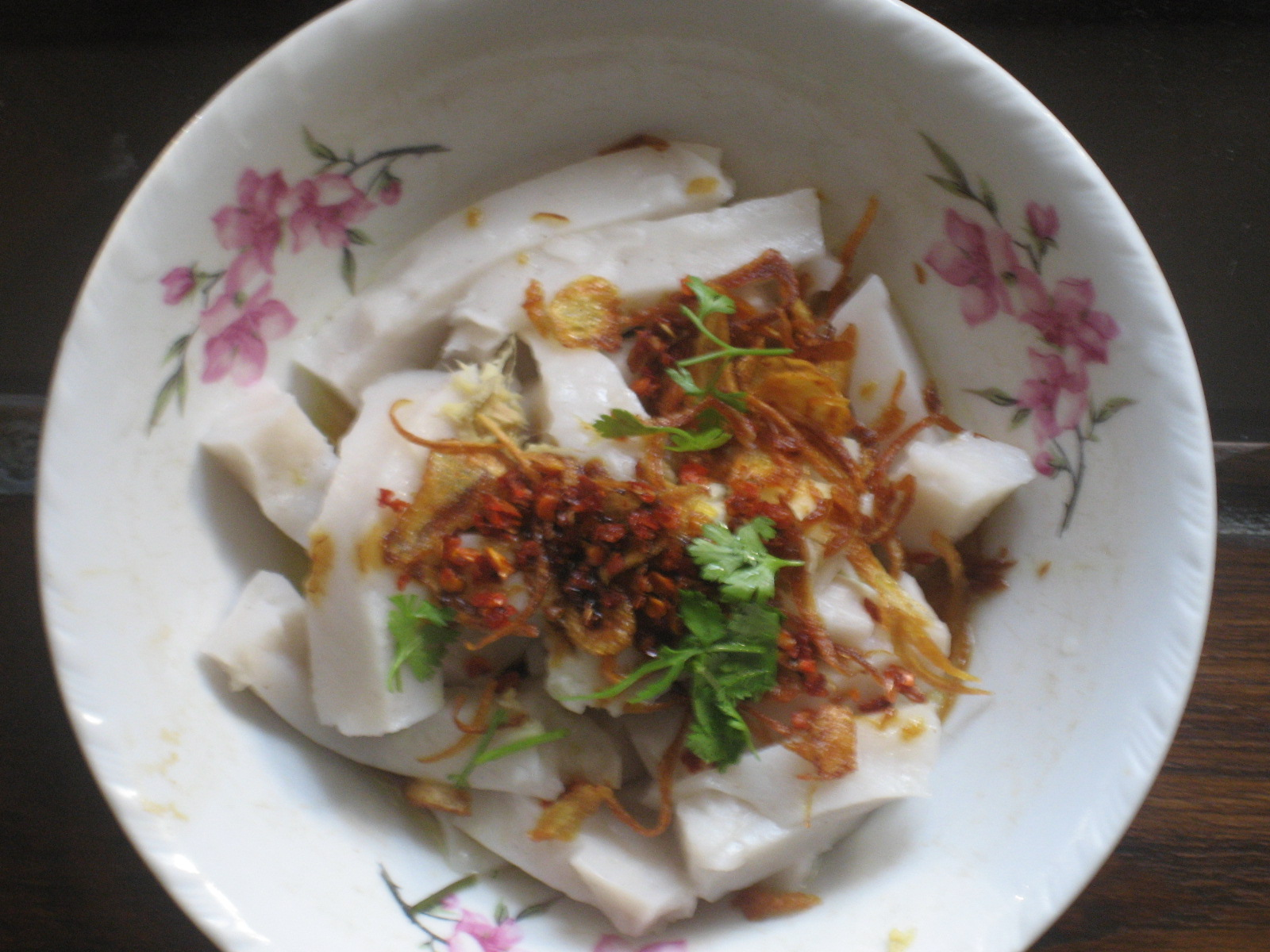
Hsan ta hpo (rice tofu) salad from the Shan States is as popular as the yellow Burmese tofu salad.

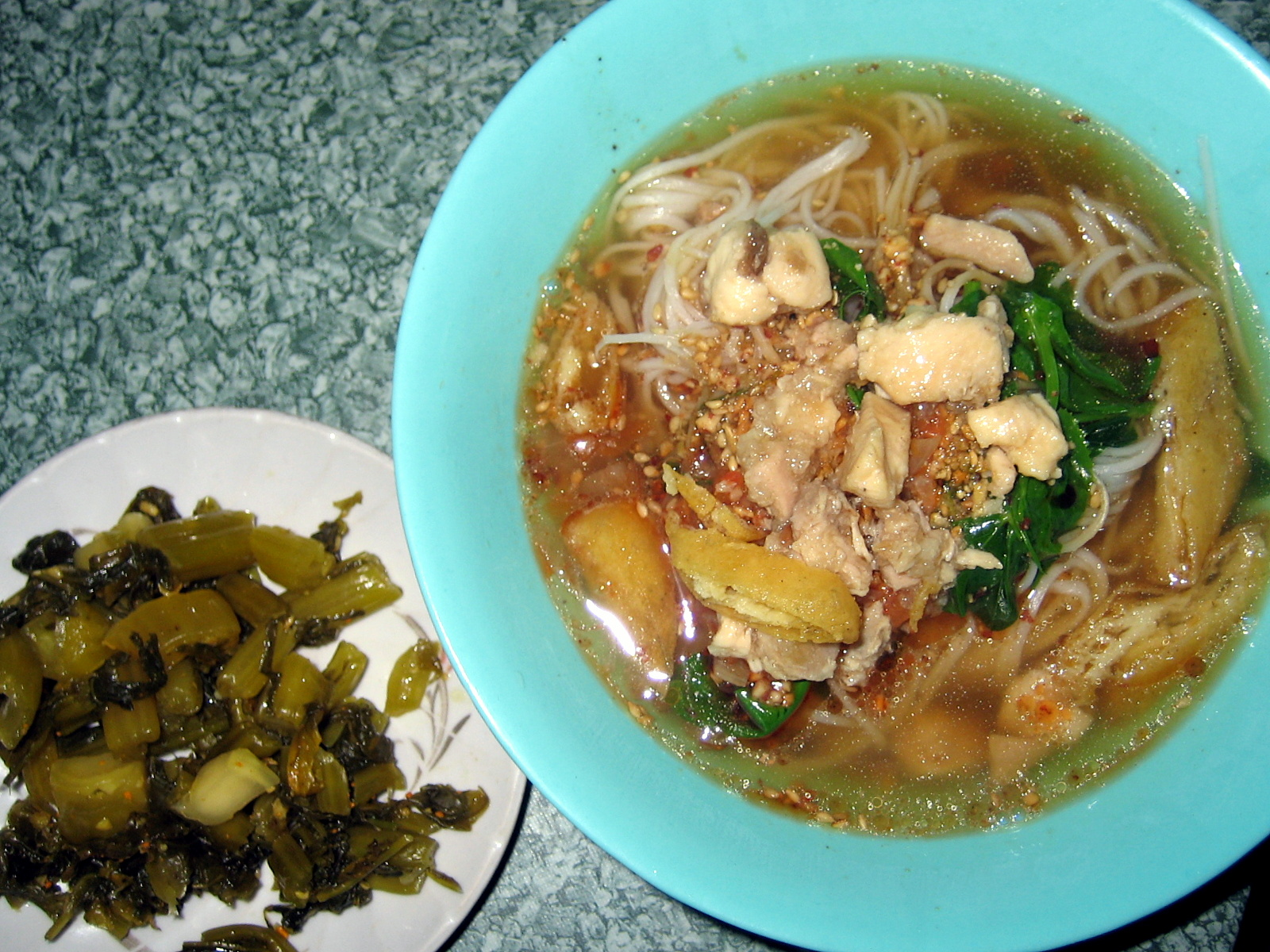
Shan hkauk swè (Shan rice noodles) with to hpu gyaw (tofu fritters) served with monnyingyin (pickled mustard greens) on the side

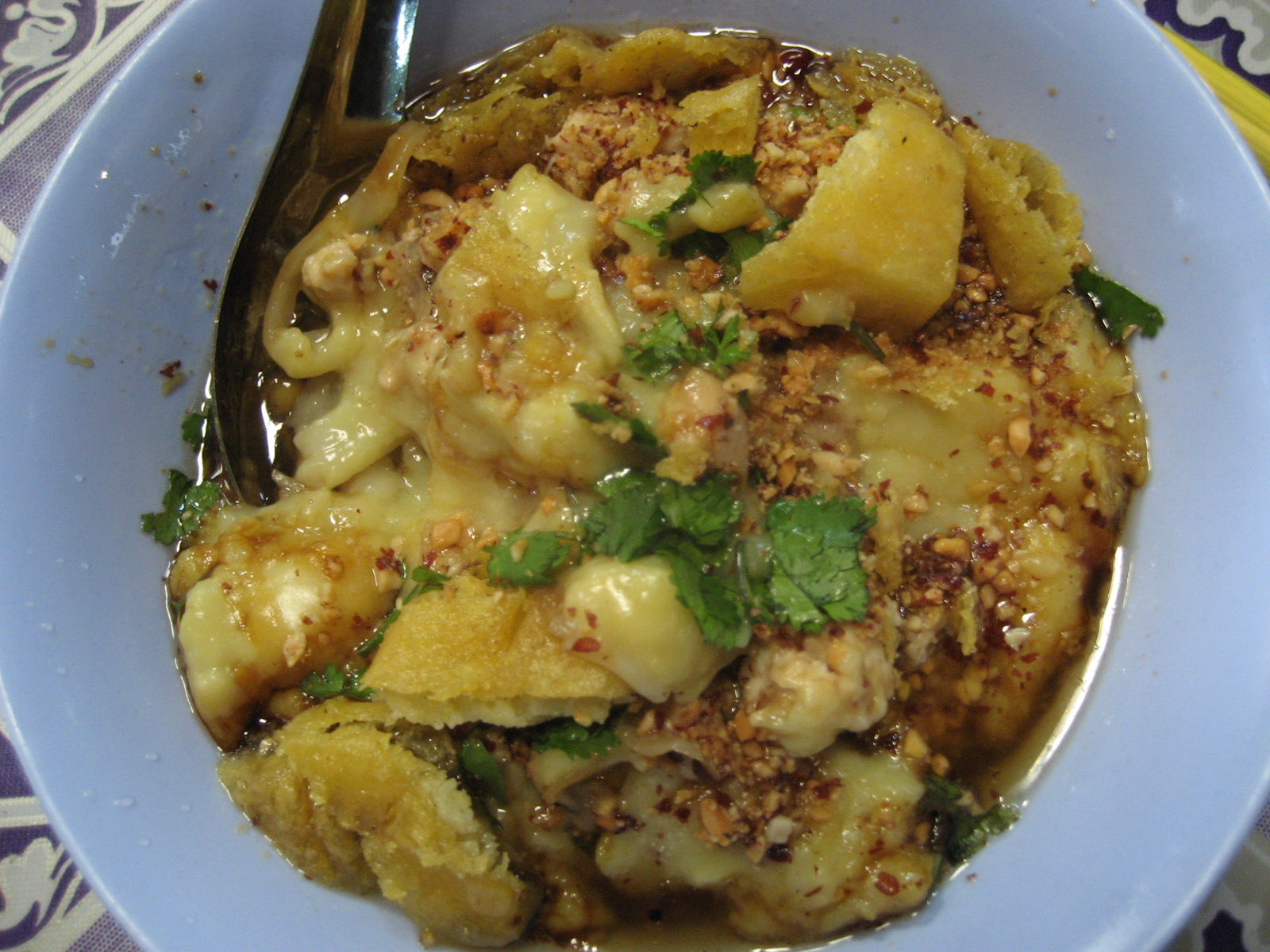
To hpu nway (warm Shan tofu) and to hpu gyaw (Shan tofu fritters) salad combines the creamy and crispy forms into a satisfying meal.

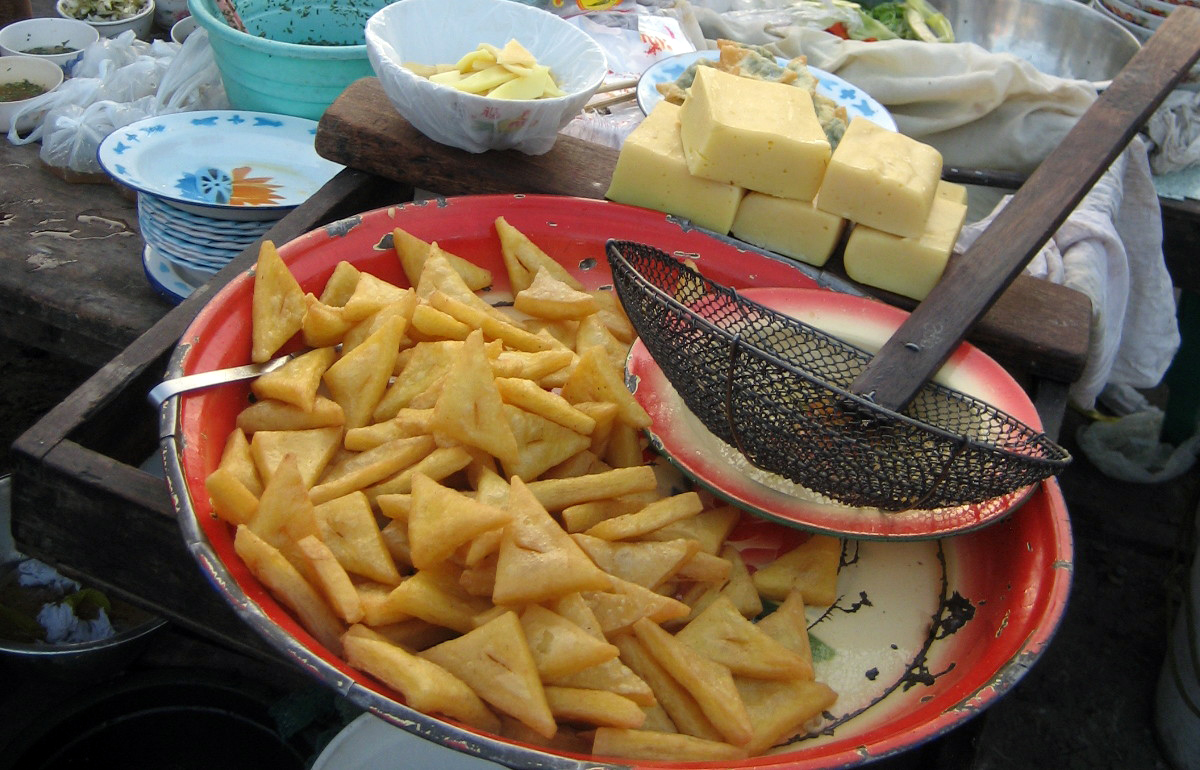
hnapyan gyaw - twice fried tofu at Shan Market in Mandalay

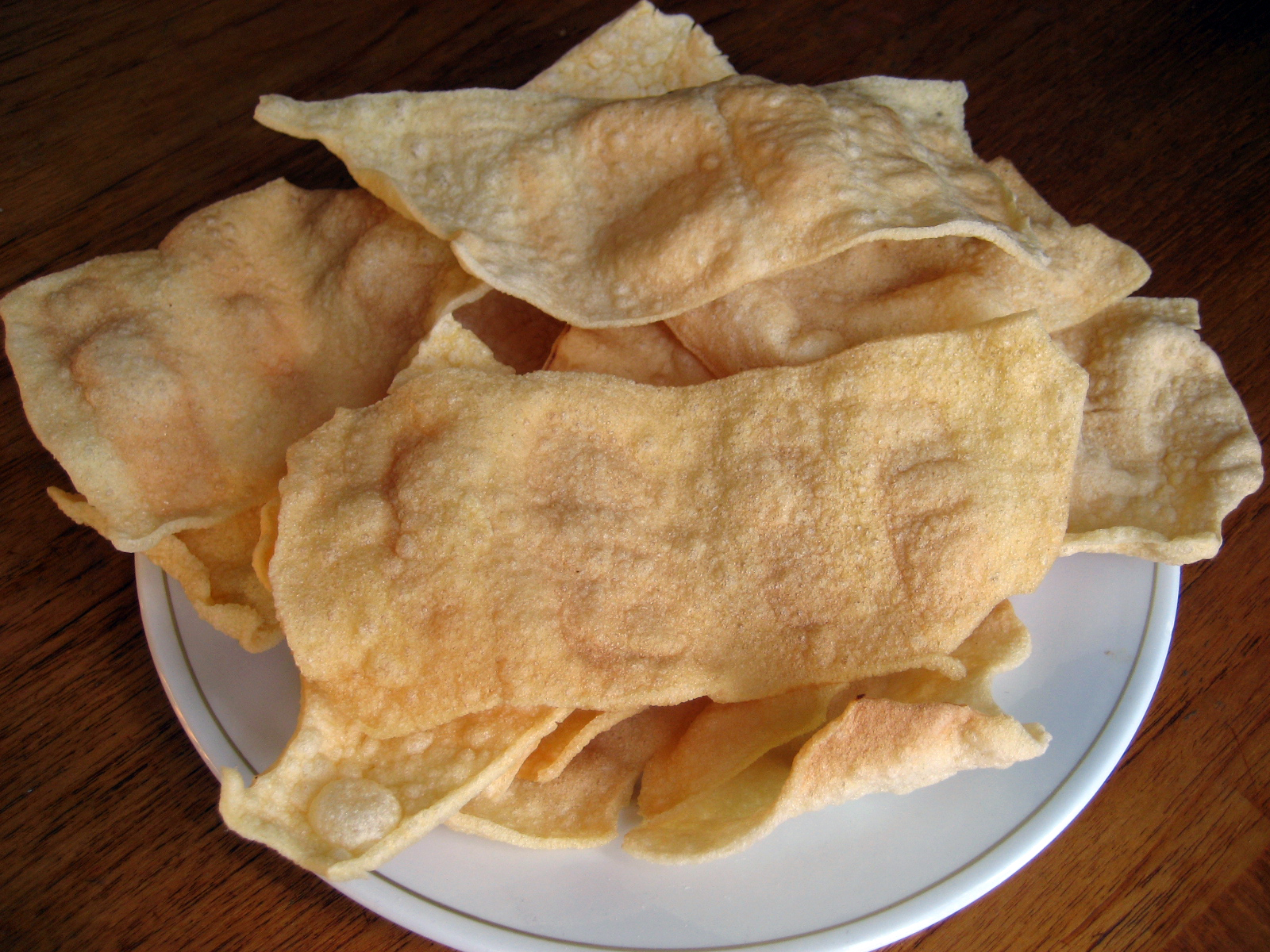
Fried to hpu gyauk make great crackers - a welcome treat.

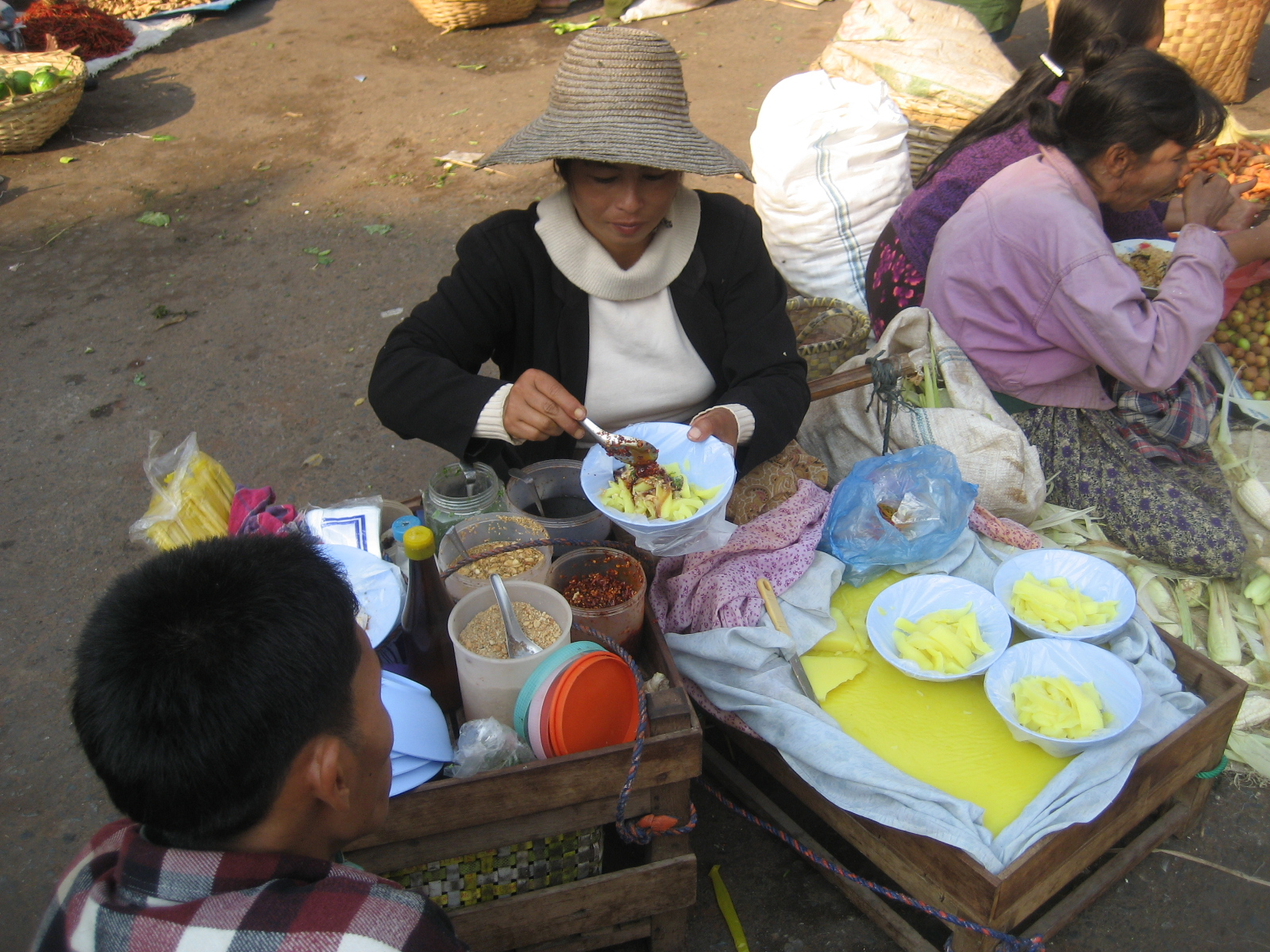
To hpu thouk (Shan tofu salad) hawker at Kaingdan Market in Mandalay

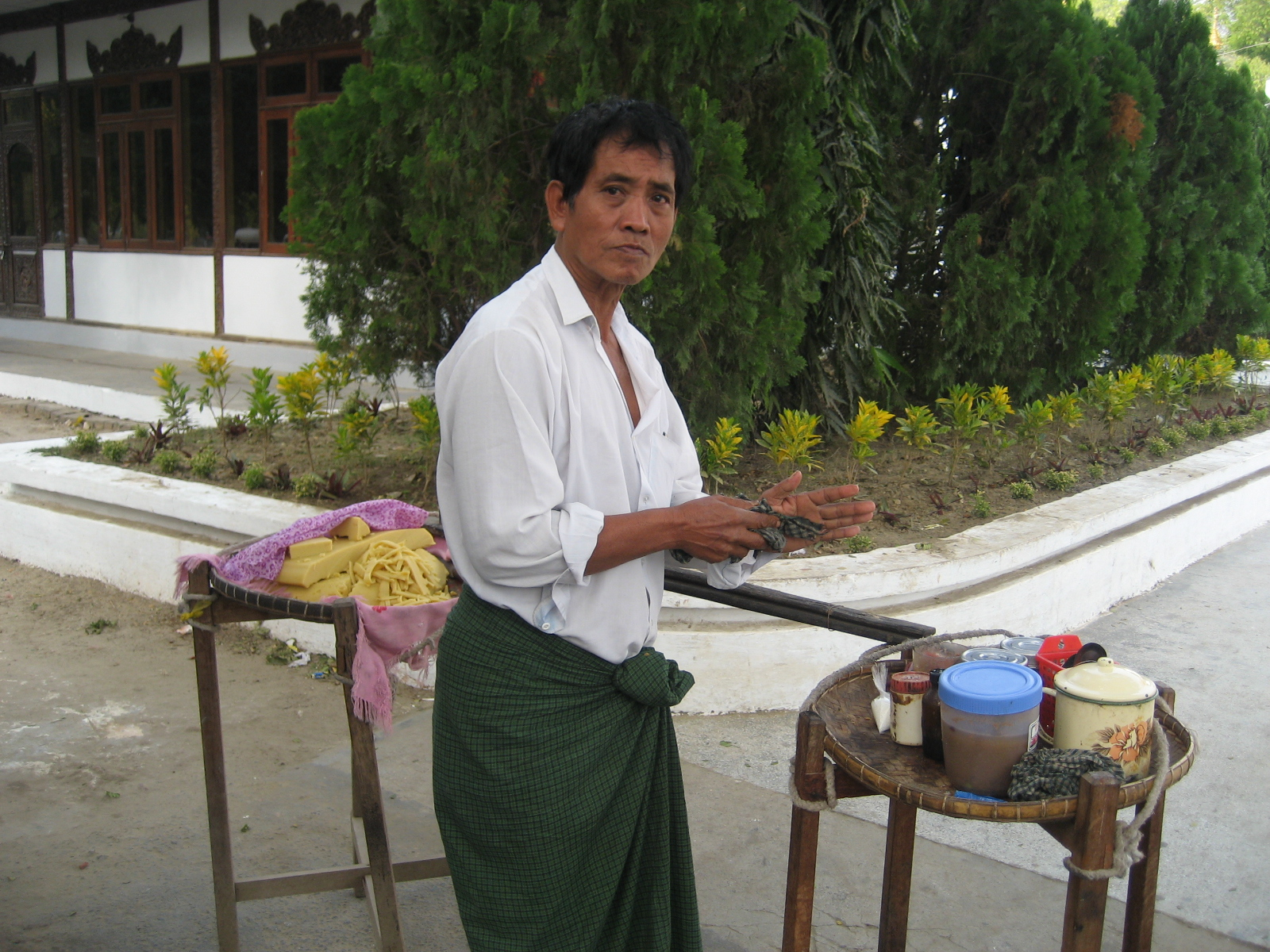
To hpu thouk (Burmese tofu salad) hawker at Kuthodaw Pagoda, Mandalay

== See also ==
- Cuisine of Myanmar
- Dotorimuk
- Farinata
- Jidou liangfen
- Memilmuk
- Nokdumuk
- Panelle
- Tofu
