= Nokdu-muk =

Korean mung bean jelly

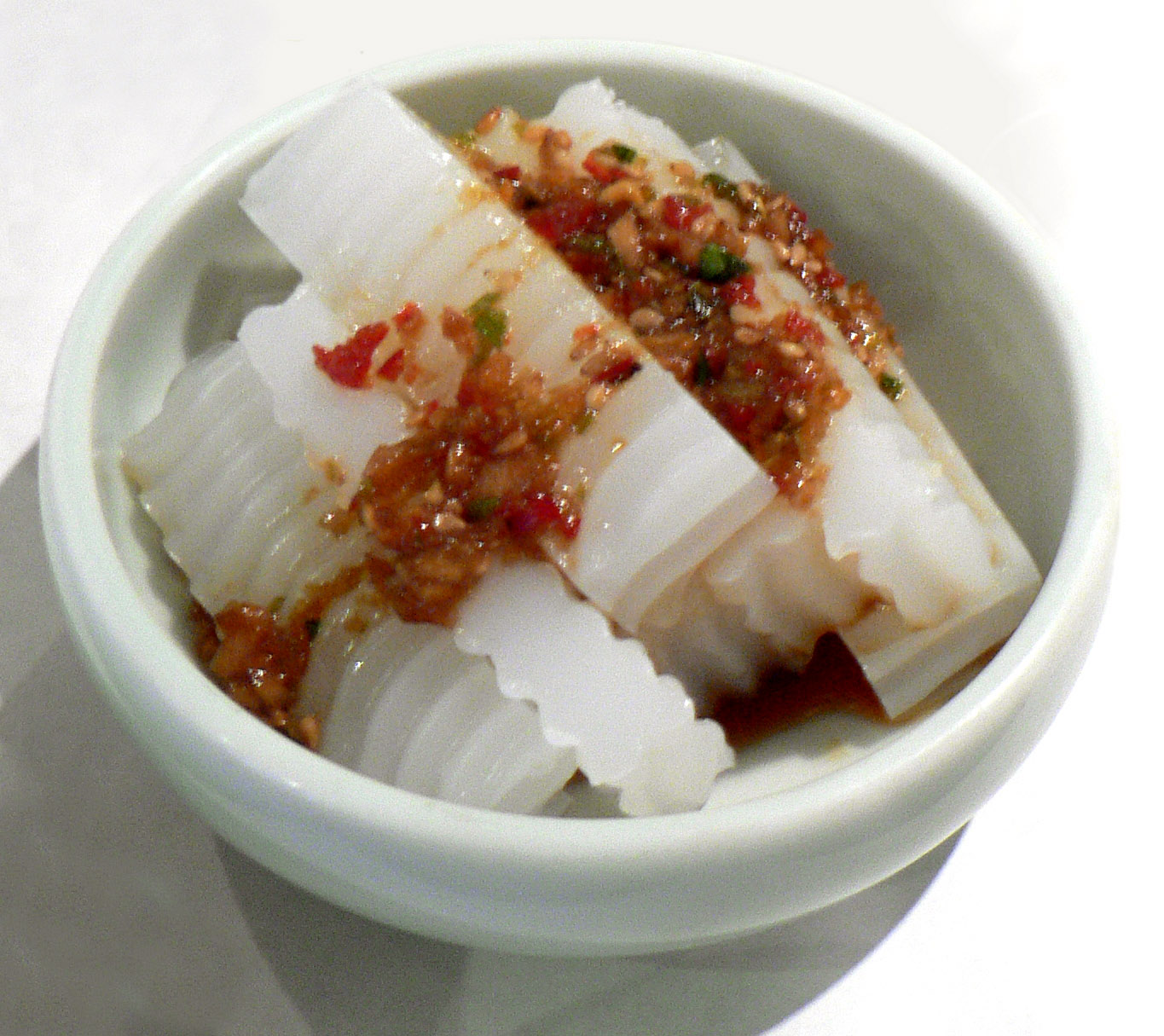
- Cheongpo-muk
- Type: Muk
- Place of origin: Korea
- Main ingredients: Mung bean
- Variations: Cheongpo-muk, hwangpo-muk
- Similar dishes: Liangfen

Korean name
- Hangul: 녹두묵
- Hanja: 綠豆묵
- RR: nokdumuk
- MR: noktumuk
- IPA: [nok̚.t͈u.muk̚]

Alternate name
- Hangul: 청포묵
- Hanja: 淸泡묵
- Lit.: Clear mung bean jelly
- RR: cheongpomuk
- MR: ch'ŏngp'omuk
- IPA: [tɕʰʌŋ.pʰo.muk̚]

Alternate name
- Hangul: 황포묵
- Hanja: 黃泡묵
- Lit.: Yellow mung bean jelly
- RR: hwangpomuk
- MR: hwangp'omuk
- IPA: [hwaŋ.pʰo.muk̚]

Nokdu-muk (Korean: 녹두묵; lit. mung bean jelly) is a Korean muk, or jelly, made from mung bean starch. In its most commonly encountered form, it is also called cheongpo-muk (청포묵; 淸泡묵), which literally means "clear froth jelly," owing to its clear white color. If it is colored with gardenia, the nokdu-muk is called hwangpo-muk, which literally means "yellow froth jelly."

Nokdu-muk is usually served cold, usually as the banchan (side dish) nokdu-muk-muchim (녹두묵무침). As it has little flavor of its own, nokdu-muk is typically seasoned with soy sauce and vinegar.

Nokdu-muk is a common food for special occasions. It is often served at Korean weddings and other celebrations. Nokdumuk is also used as a main ingredient for making the Korean royal cuisine dish called tangpyeong-chae. It is made by mixing julienned nokdu-muk, stir-fried shredded beef, and various vegetables seasoned with soy sauce, vinegar, sugar, sesame seeds, salt, and sesame oil.

Hwangpo-muk (황포묵) or norang-muk (노랑묵) is a Korean food which is a yellow jelly made from mung beans. The yellow color comes from dyeing with the fruit of gardenia. This jelly is particularly associated with Jeolla cuisine, and is a noted staple food of Namwon and also Jeonju (both cities in North Jeolla Province), where it is a common ingredient of Jeonju-style bibimbap.

As with other varieties of muk (Korean jelly), hwangpomuk is commonly served in small chunks seasoned with vinegar, soy sauce, and other condiments; this side dish is called hwangpomuk-muchim (황포묵무침).

== Gallery ==
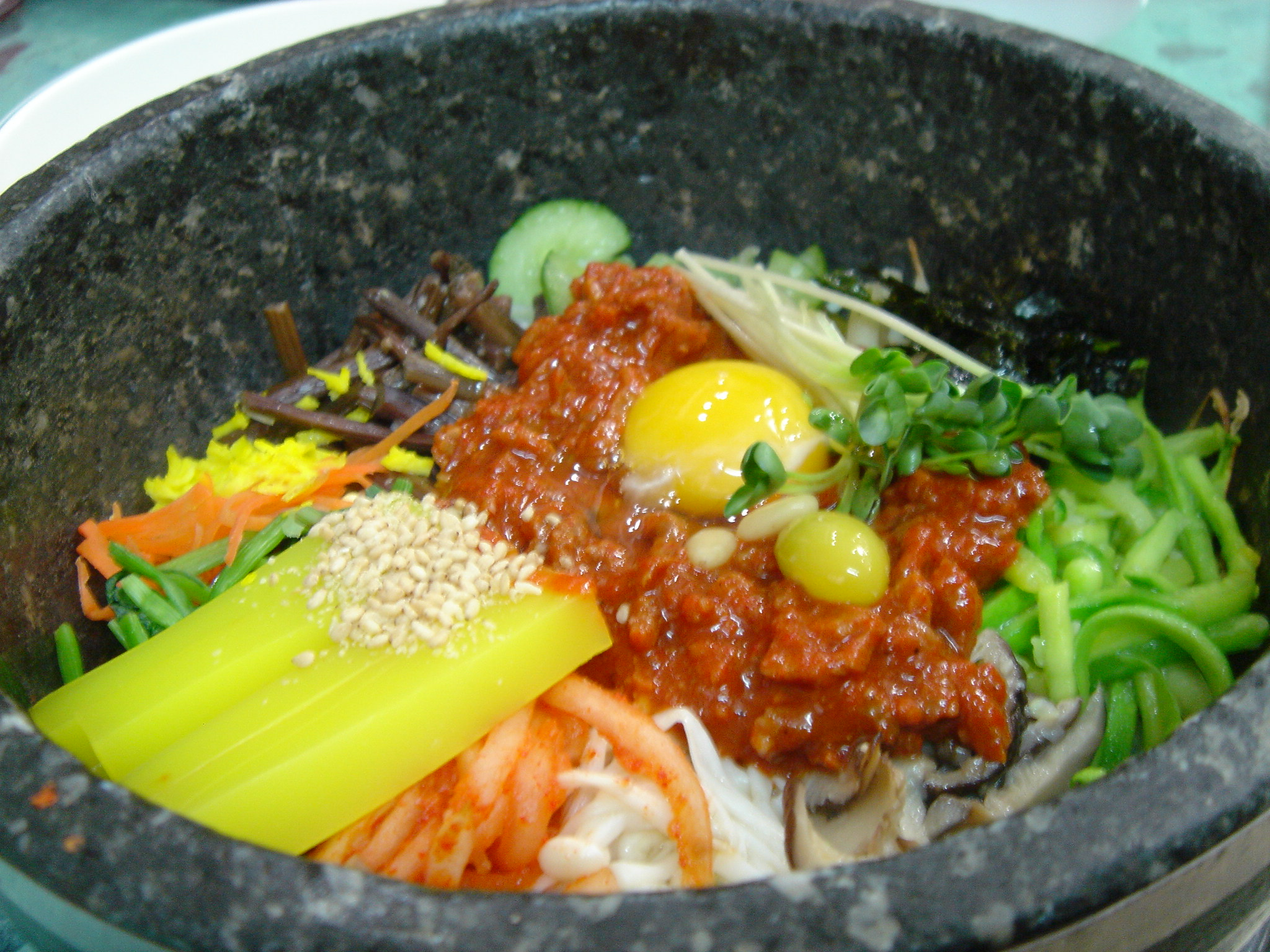
Hwangpo-muk (bottom left) in bibimbap

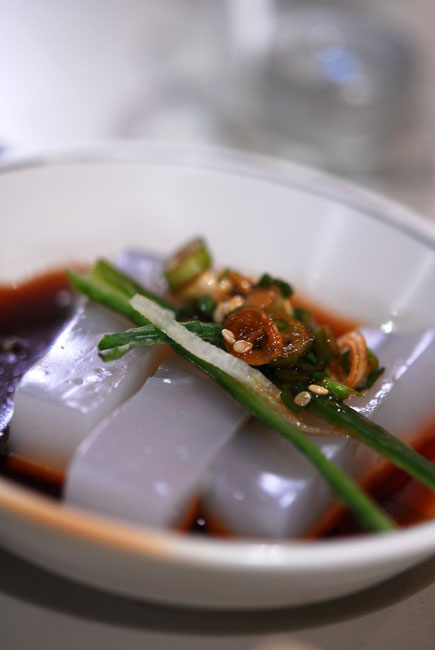
Cheongpo-muk as banchan

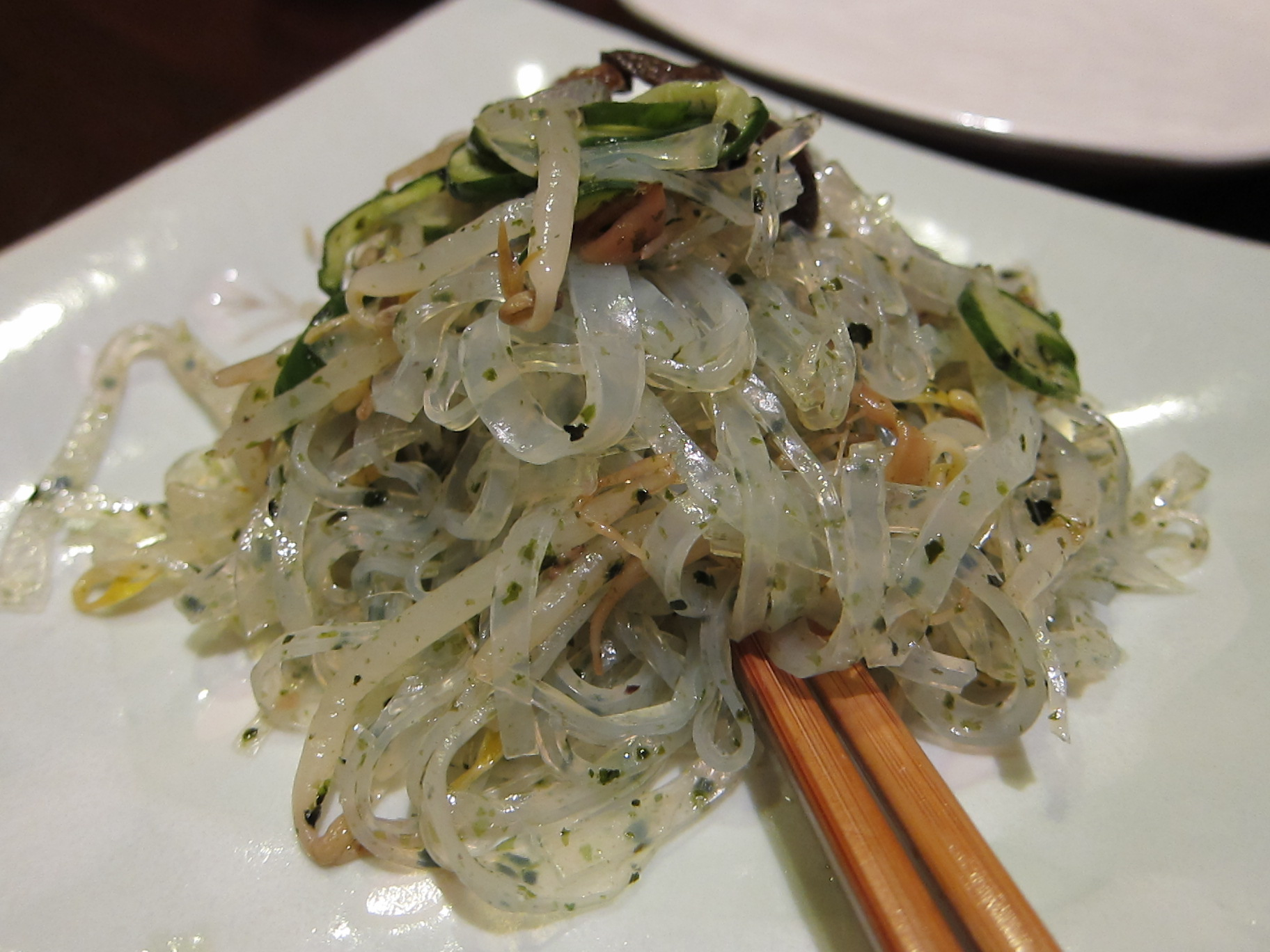
Cheongpo-muk-muchim (mung bean jelly salad)

== See also ==
- Dotori-muk – acorn jelly
- Korean cuisine
- Laping – mung bean jelly from Tibet
- Liangfen – mung bean jelly from North China
- Memil-muk – buckwheat jelly
