= Yasik =

South Korean midnight snack culture

Yasik (Korean: 야식; Hanja: 夜食) is a term referring to South Korea's midnight snack culture.

The dictionary meaning of yasik is 'the food eaten in the middle of the night after dinner.'

Korea's top yasik favourites include: ramyeon (라면), typically eaten with kimchi, chicken and beer (chimaek, 치킨, 맥주), jokbal and bossam (족발, 보쌈), tteokbokki and sundae (떡볶이, 순대), gungoguma (roasted sweet potatoes) and hoppang (군고구마, 호빵). Kimbap and jokbal is also popular. Past favorites, now less popular, include memilmuk (buckwheat jelly) and chapssaltteok (rice cakes filled with sweet beans).

Fried chicken, first introduced in Korea in the 1980s, and pizza also top the list of night-time favorites. Fried chicken, in particular, has become a wide market, with chicken restaurant chains continually developing new sauces and asking various Hallyu stars to promote their respective brands.

== See also ==
- Daa laang
