= Lost Lake (El Dorado County, California) =

Lake in the state of California, United States

- Location within California Location within the United States
- Location: Desolation Wilderness; El Dorado County, California
- Coordinates: 38°51′38″N 120°05′51″W
- Basin countries: United States
- Surface area: 0.7 ha (1.7 acres)
- Average depth: 1.9 m (6.2 ft)
- Water volume: 12,500 m^{3} (10.1 acre⋅ft)
- Surface elevation: 2,475 m (8,120 ft)
- Frozen: November–June
- References: U.S. Geological Survey Geographic Names Information System: Lost Lake

Lost Lake is a lake in the Desolation Wilderness in the Sierra Nevada, south of Lake Tahoe in El Dorado County, California, United States.

Not to be confused with Lost Lake Resort, which is near the Colorado River. Also not to be confused with the 'Lost Lake' off the Cajon Pass, also in California.

== See also ==
- List of lakes in California
