= Memil-muk =

Korean buckwheat jelly

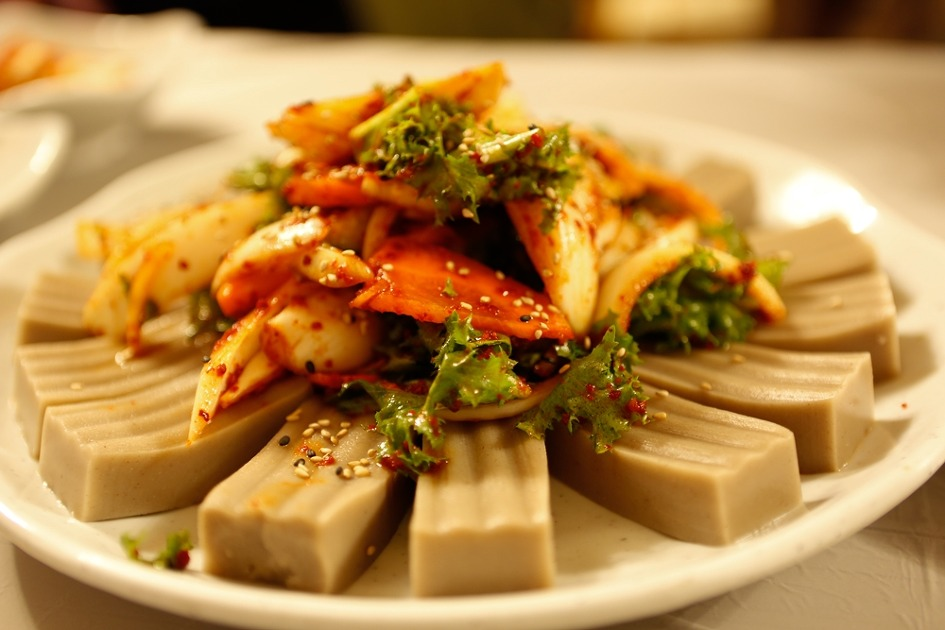
- Memil-muk-muchim
- Alternative names: Buckwheat jelly
- Type: Muk
- Place of origin: Korea
- Associated cuisine: Korean cuisine
- Main ingredients: Buckwheat starch

Korean name
- Hangul: 메밀묵
- RR: memilmuk
- MR: memilmuk
- IPA: [me.mil.muk̚]

Memil-muk (Korean: 메밀묵) or buckwheat jelly is a light gray-brown muk (jelly) made from buckwheat starch. It is commonly served as banchan (a side dish accompanying rice) as well as anju (food accompanying alcoholic drinks).

In post-war Korea, from the mid to late-20th century, memil-muk along with chapssal-tteok (glutinous rice cakes) was widely served as yasik (late-night snack) by street vendors. In modern times, it is popular as a diet food.

Along with other buckwheat dishes, it is a local specialty of Gangwon Province, especially Bongpyeong-myeon in Pyeongchang County.

== Preparation ==
Unhulled whole buckwheat grains are soaked in water (to reduce bitterness). Soaked grains are then ground in maetdol (millstone) and sieved. The skins are discarded, and the remaining liquid is set aside to allow it to separate into layers. The upper layer, consisting of clear water, is discarded. The lower layer, consisting of settled buckwheat starch, is boiled with constant stirring. When cooled, the mixture sets to form a jelly-like substance, muk.

Memil-muk is most commonly eaten as memil-muk-muchim (메밀묵무침; "buckwheat jelly salad"), a banchan (side dish) in which chunks of memil-muk are mixed with chopped kimchi, ground toasted sesame seeds and soy sauce. In Gangwon Province, memil-muk is used in jesa (ancestral rites) for deceased ancestors. In summer, memil-muk-sabal (메밀묵사발; "cold buckwheat jelly soup") is made with cold kimchi broth, while in winter, memil-muk is served in hot jangguk (soy sauce-based beef broth).

In Yeongju, some houses are still made in the traditional way and eat muk-bap (묵밥).

== In folklore ==
In ancient times, memil-muk was thought to be irresistible to dokkaebi (Korean goblins).

Memil-muk is offered in dokkaebi-gut, a gut (shamanistic ritual performed by a mu shaman) for chasing away dokkaebi, which were believed to be the causes of contagious diseases. Other rituals with similar purpose, such as dokkaebi-je, a jesa (Confucian ritual, held in households), and dokkaebi-gosa, a gosa (shamanistic or Buddhist household ritual, held in households), also include the offering of memil-muk.

== Gallery ==
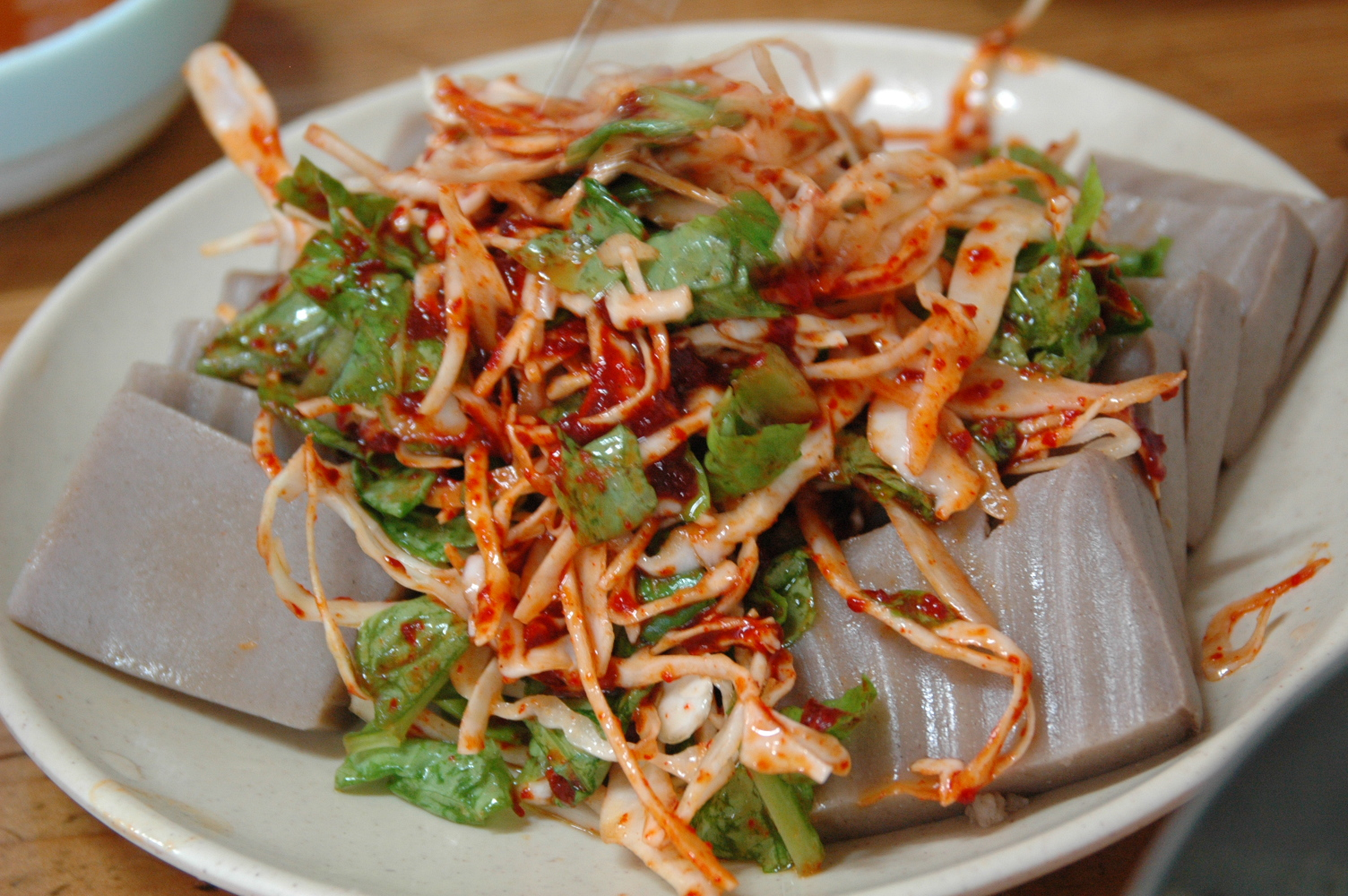
Memil-muk-muchim (buckwheat jelly salad)

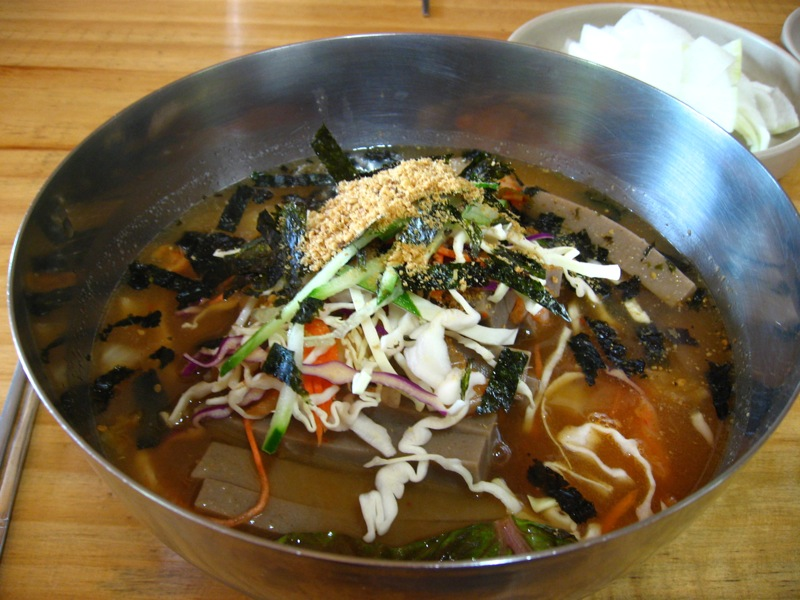
Memil-muk-sabal (cold buckwheat jelly soup)

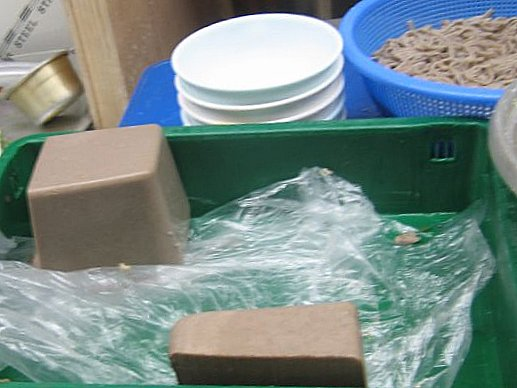
Blocks of memil-muk (buckwheat jelly)

== See also ==
- Dotori-muk, acorn jelly
- Nokdu-muk, mung bean jelly
- Konnyaku, Japanese konjac jelly
- List of buckwheat dishes
