= Acorn =

Nut of the oak tree

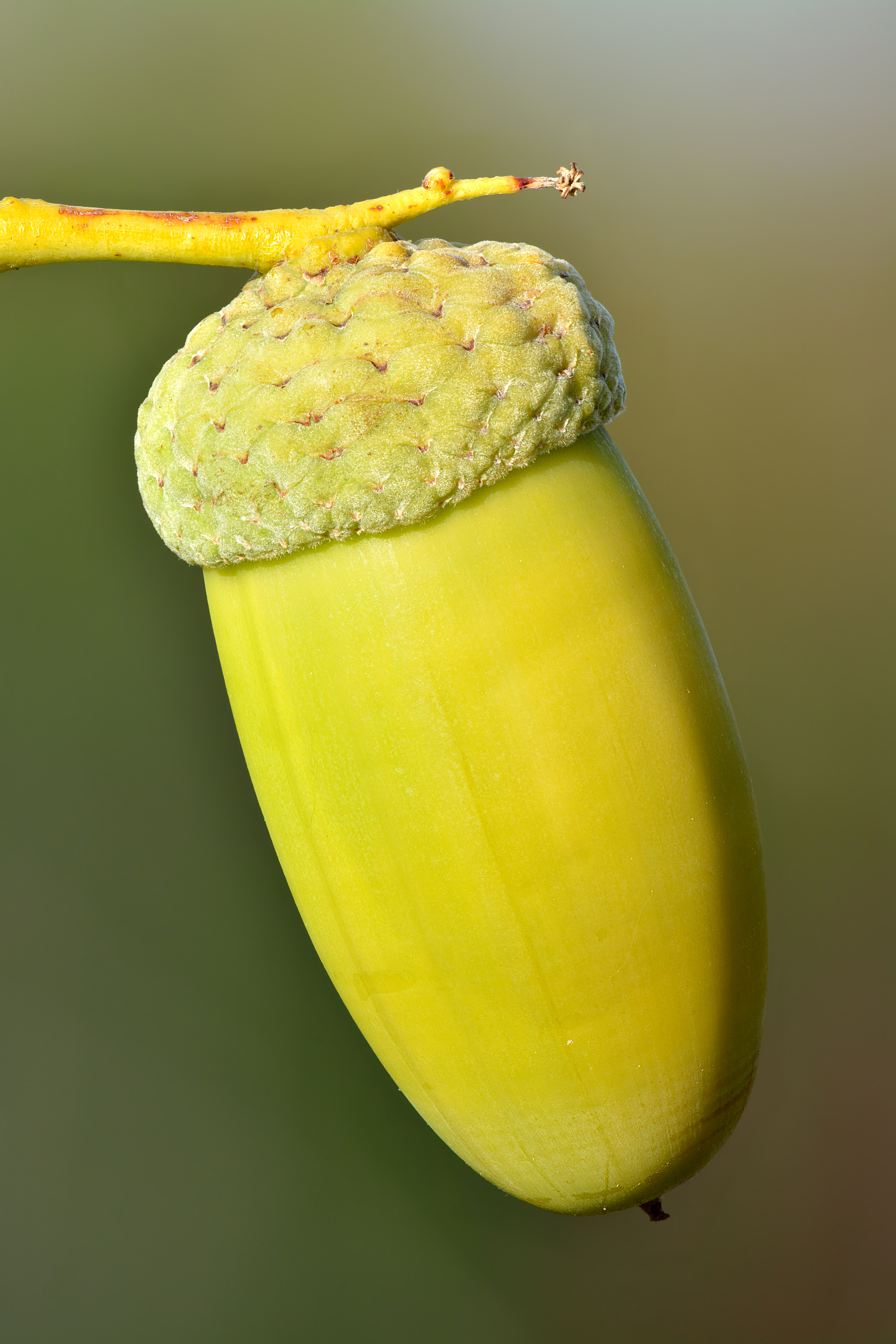
English oak acorn

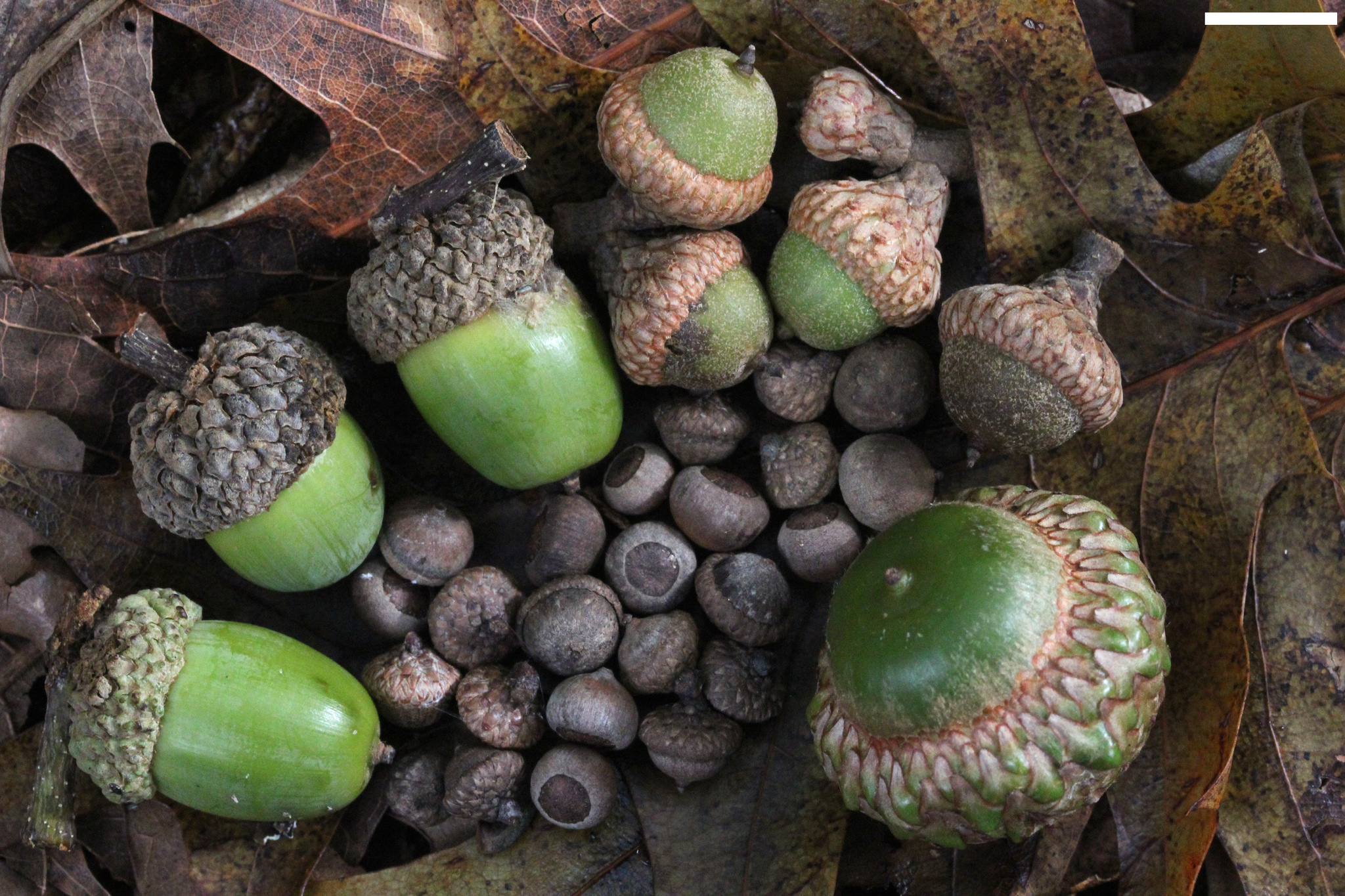
Acorns of the willow oak in South Carolina (from small to large, counterclockwise from center): Q. phellos (willow oak), Q. falcata (southern red oak; top right), Q. alba (white oak), and Q. coccinea (scarlet oak). Scale bar at upper right is 1 cm.

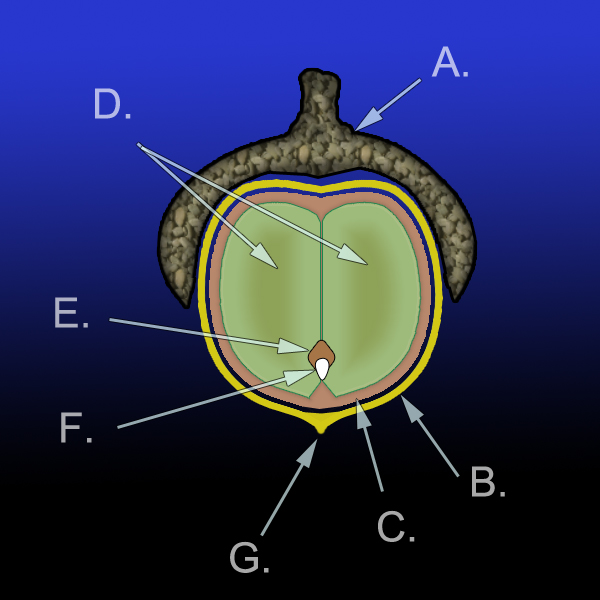
Diagram of the anatomy of an acorn: A.) Cupule B.) Pericarp (fruit wall) C.) Seed coat (testa) D.) Cotyledons (2) E.) Plumule F.) Radicle G.) Remains of style. Together D., E., and F. make up the embryo.

The acorn is the nut of the oaks and their close relatives (genera Quercus, Notholithocarpus and Lithocarpus, in the family Fagaceae); alternatively known as glans. It usually contains a seedling surrounded by two cotyledons (seedling leaves), enclosed in a tough shell known as the pericarp, and borne in a cup-shaped cupule. Acorns take between 5 and 24 months (depending on the species) to mature; see the list of Quercus species for details of oak classification, in which acorn morphology and phenology are important factors.

== Etymology ==
The word acorn (earlier akerne, and acharn) is related to the Gothic name akran, which had the sense of "fruit of the unenclosed land". The word was applied to the most important forest produce, that of the oak. Chaucer spoke of "achornes of okes" in the 14th century. By degrees, popular etymology connected the word both with "corn" and "oak-horn", and the spelling changed accordingly. The current spelling (emerged c. 15th–16th century) derives from association with ac (Old English: "oak") + corn. The Latin glans as found in many literature regarding it originally applies to any nut is the root of several Romance words for the acorn (the French gland, Catalan gla, Italian ghianda) cognate to Greek βάλανος, which also extends to the vascular penile tip from similarity in shape.

== Ecology ==
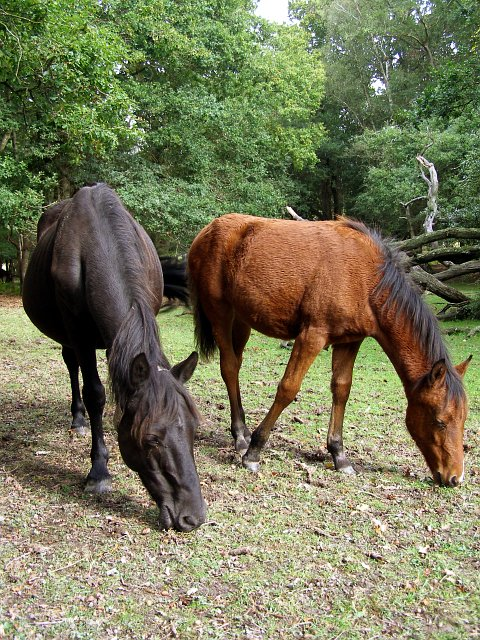
Horses eating acorns. Acorns can cause painful death in equines, especially if eaten in excess.

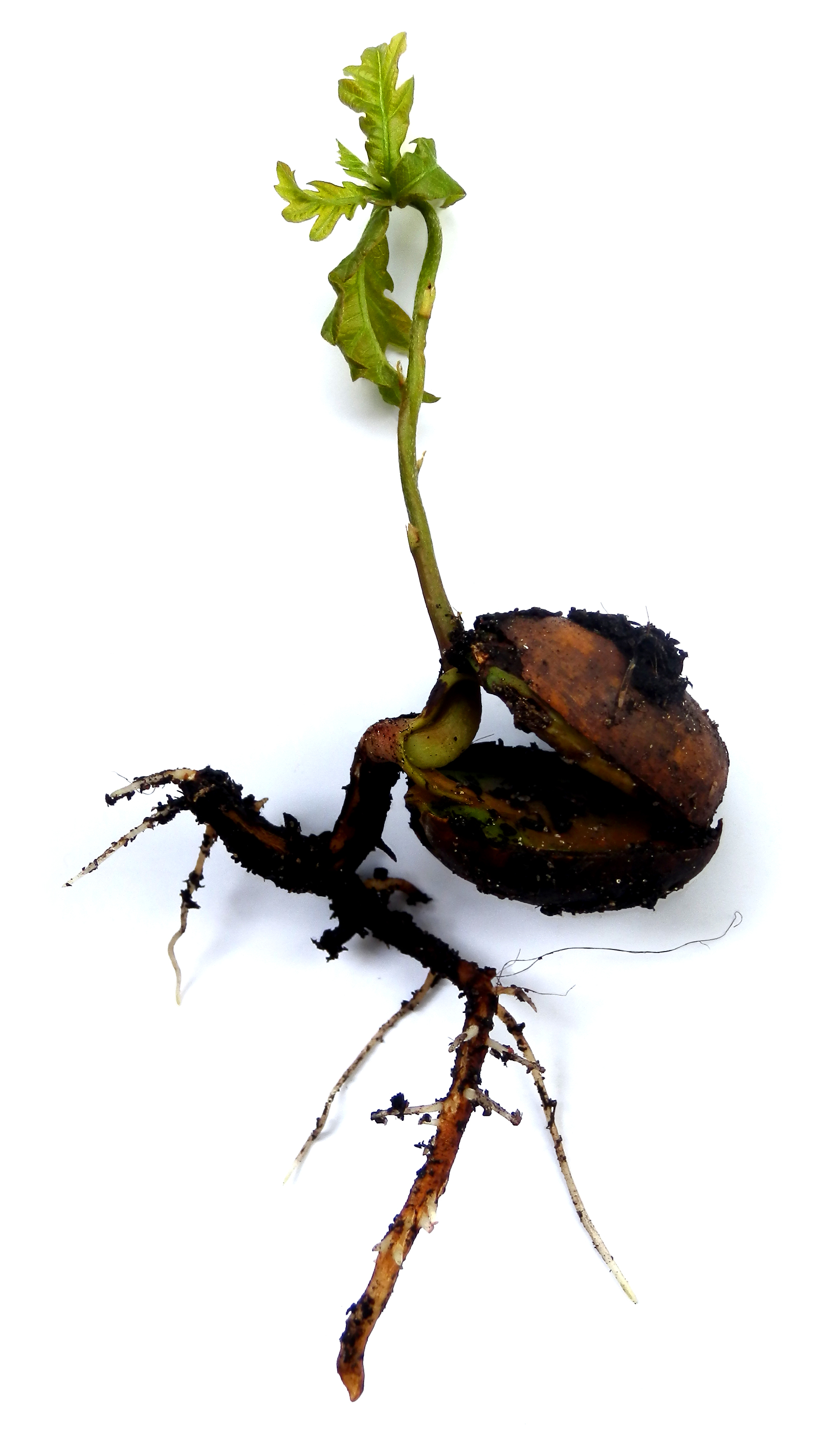
Sprouting acorn of Quercus robur

Acorns play an important role in forest ecology when oaks are plentiful or dominant in the landscape. The volume of the acorn crop may vary widely, creating great abundance or great stress on the many animals dependent on acorns and the predators of those animals. Acorns, along with other nuts, are termed mast.

Wildlife that consume acorns as an important part of their diets include birds, such as jays, pigeons, some ducks, and several species of woodpeckers. Small mammals that feed on acorns include mice, squirrels and several other rodents. One beetle species, Thorectes lusitanicus, also feeds on acorns. Acorns have a large influence on small rodents in their habitats, as large acorn yields help rodent populations to grow.

Large mammals such as pigs, bears, and deer also consume large amounts of acorns; they may constitute up to 25% of the diet of deer in the autumn. In Spain, Portugal and the New Forest region of southern England, pigs are still turned loose in dehesas (large oak groves) in the autumn, to fill and fatten themselves on acorns. Heavy consumption of acorns can, on the other hand, be toxic to other animals that cannot detoxify their tannins, such as horses and cattle, especially if eaten in excess.

The larvae of some moths and weevils also live in young acorns, consuming the kernels as they develop.

Acorns are attractive to animals because they are large and thus efficiently consumed or cached. Acorns are also rich in nutrients. Percentages vary from species to species, but all acorns contain large amounts of protein, carbohydrates and fats, as well as the minerals calcium, phosphorus and potassium, and the vitamin niacin. Total food energy in an acorn also varies by species, but all compare well with other wild foods and with other nuts.

Acorns also contain bitter tannins, the amount varying with the species. Since tannins, which are plant polyphenols, interfere with an animal's ability to metabolize protein, creatures must adapt in different ways to use the nutritional value acorns contain. Animals may preferentially select acorns that contain fewer tannins. When the tannins are metabolized in cattle, the tannic acid produced can cause ulceration and kidney failure.

Animals that cache acorns, such as jays and squirrels, may wait to consume some of these acorns until sufficient groundwater has percolated through them to leach out the tannins. Other animals buffer their acorn diet with other foods. Many insects, birds, and mammals metabolize tannins with fewer ill effects than do humans.

Species of acorn that contain large amounts of tannins are very bitter, astringent, and potentially irritating if eaten raw. This is particularly true of the acorns of American red oaks and English oaks. The acorns of white oaks, being much lower in tannins, are nutty in flavor; this characteristic is enhanced if the acorns are given a light roast before grinding.

Tannins can be removed by soaking chopped acorns in several changes of water, until the water no longer turns brown. Cold water leaching can take several days, but three to four changes of boiling water can leach the tannins in under an hour. Hot water leaching (boiling) cooks the starch of the acorn, which would otherwise act like gluten in flour, helping it bind to itself. For this reason, if the acorns will be used to make flour, then cold water leaching is preferred.

Being rich in fat, acorn flour can spoil or molder easily and must be carefully stored. Acorns are also sometimes prepared as a massage oil.

Acorns of the white oak group, Leucobalanus, typically start rooting as soon as they are in contact with the soil (in the fall), then send up the leaf shoot in the spring.

=== Dispersal agents ===
Acorns are too heavy for wind dispersal, so they require other ways to spread. Oaks therefore depend on biological seed dispersal agents to move the acorns beyond the mother tree and into a suitable area for germination (including access to adequate water, sunlight and soil nutrients), ideally a minimum of 20–30 m (70–100 ft) from the parent tree.

Many animals eat unripe acorns on the tree or ripe acorns from the ground, with no reproductive benefit to the oak, but some animals, such as squirrels and jays serve as seed dispersal agents. Jays and squirrels that scatter-hoard acorns in caches for future use effectively plant acorns in a variety of locations in which it is possible for them to germinate and thrive.

Even though jays and squirrels retain remarkably large mental maps of cache locations and return to eat them, the odd acorn may be lost, or a jay or squirrel may die before consuming all of its stores. A small number of acorns manage to germinate and survive, producing the next generation of oaks.

Scatter-hoarding behavior depends on jays and squirrels associating with plants that provide good packets of food that are nutritionally valuable, but not too big for the dispersal agent to handle. The beak sizes of jays determine how large acorns may get before jays ignore them.

Acorns germinate on different schedules, depending on their place in the oak family. Once acorns sprout, they are less nutritious, as the seed tissue converts to the indigestible lignins that form the root.

Acorn, raw
Nutritional value per 100 g (3.5 oz)
- Energy: 1,619 kJ (387 kcal)
- Carbohydrates: 40.75 g
- Fat: 23.85 g
- Saturated: 3.102 g
- Monounsaturated: 15.109 g
- Polyunsaturated: 4.596 g
- Protein: 6.15 g
Amino acids
Tryptophan	0.074 g
Threonine	0.236 g
Isoleucine	0.285 g
Leucine	0.489 g
Lysine	0.384 g
Methionine	0.103 g
Cystine	0.109 g
Phenylalanine	0.269 g
Tyrosine	0.187 g
Valine	0.345 g
Arginine	0.473 g
Histidine	0.170 g
Alanine	0.350 g
Aspartic acid	0.635 g
Glutamic acid	0.986 g
Glycine	0.285 g
Proline	0.246 g
Serine	0.261 g
Vitamins and minerals
Vitamins	Quantity %DV^{†}
Vitamin A equiv.	0% 2 μg
Thiamine (B1)	9% 0.112 mg
Riboflavin (B2)	9% 0.118 mg
Niacin (B3)	11% 1.827 mg
Pantothenic acid (B5)	14% 0.715 mg
Vitamin B6	31% 0.528 mg
Folate (B9)	22% 87 μg
Vitamin C	0% 0.0 mg
Minerals	Quantity %DV^{†}
Calcium	3% 41 mg
Copper	69%.621 mg
Iron	4% 0.79 mg
Magnesium	15% 62 mg
Manganese	58% 1.337 mg
Phosphorus	6% 79 mg
Potassium	18% 539 mg
Sodium	0% 0 mg
Zinc	5% 0.51 mg
- Other constituents: Quantity
- Water: 27.9 g
- Link to USDA Database entry
- ^{†}Percentages estimated using US recommendations for adults, except for potassium, which is estimated based on expert recommendation from the National Academies.

== Uses ==
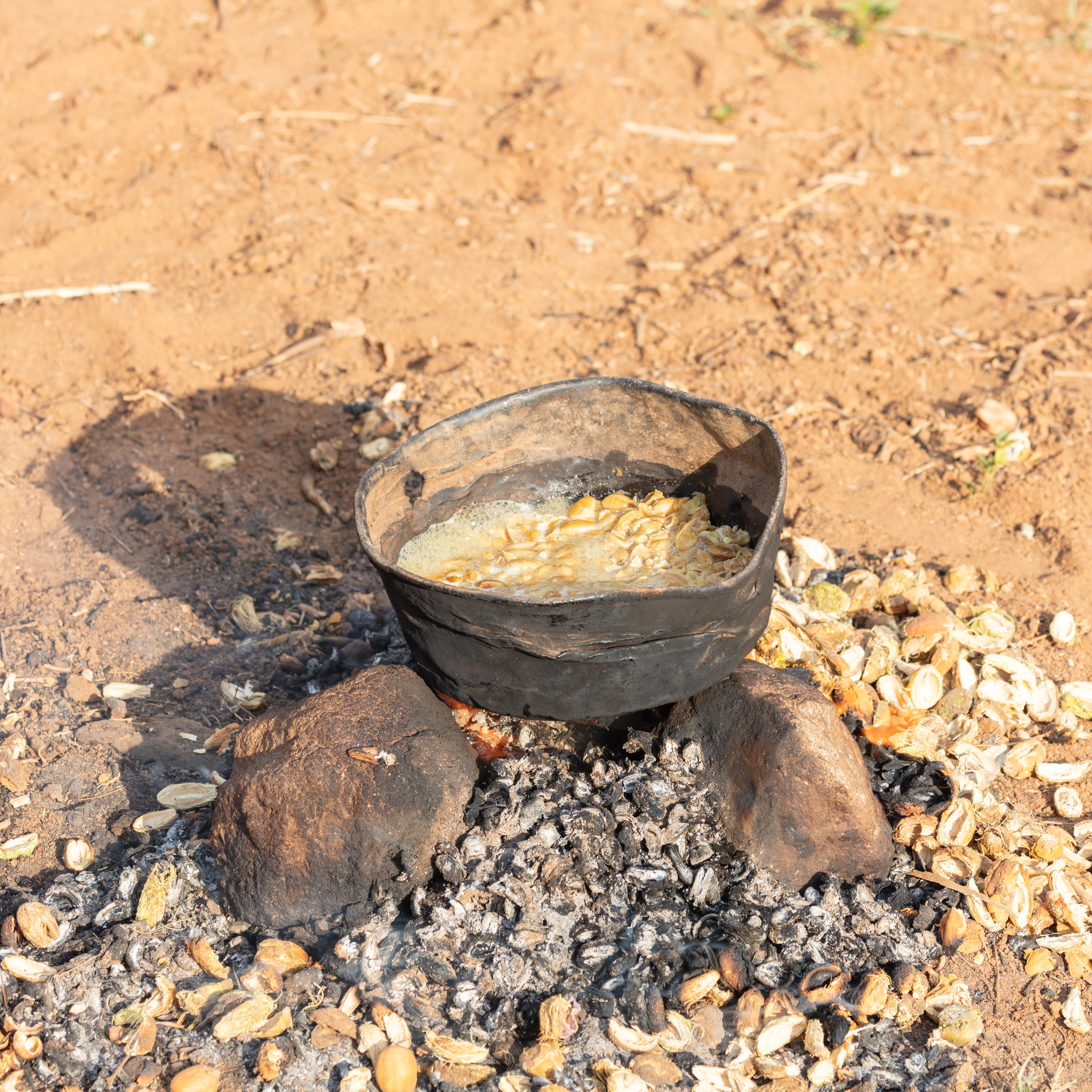
Water with acorn boiling in a pot, Kimotong, South Sudan

In some cultures, acorns once constituted a dietary staple, though they have largely been replaced by grains and are now typically considered a relatively unimportant food, except in some Native American and Korean communities.

Several cultures have devised traditional acorn-leaching methods, sometimes involving specialized tools, that were traditionally passed on to their children by word of mouth.

=== Nutrition ===
Raw acorns are 28% water, 41% carbohydrates, 24% fat, and 6% protein (table). In a reference amount of 100 g (3.5 oz), raw acorns supply 387 calories and are a rich source (20% or more of the Daily Value, DV) of vitamin B6, folate, copper, and manganese (table).

=== Culinary ===
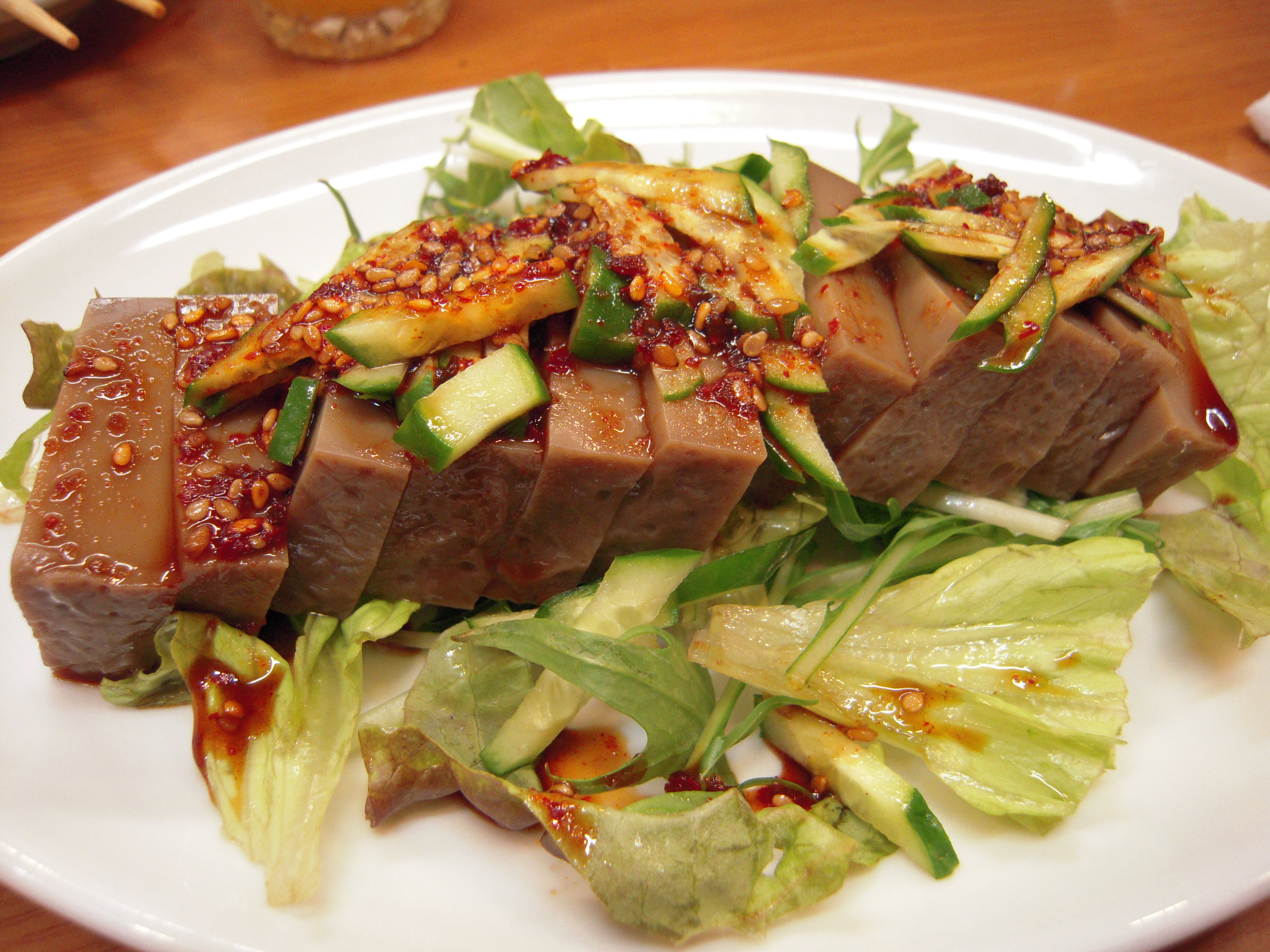
Dotori-muk, a Korean dish made with acorn starch

Acorns served an important role in early human history and were a source of food for many cultures around the world. Dental microwear suggests that Neanderthals in Belgium consumed acorns among other hard foods. Many modern human cultures relied on acorns, such as the Ancient Greek lower classes and the Japanese (during the Jōmon period), for instance. In antiquity, Pliny the Elder noted that acorn flour could be used to make bread.

==== Acorn flour ====
Acorns rarely form a large part of modern diets and are not currently cultivated on scales approaching that of many other nuts. However, if properly prepared (by selecting high-quality specimens and leaching out the bitter tannins in water), acorn meal can be used in some recipes calling for grain flours. Varieties of oak differ in the amount of tannin in their acorns. Varieties preferred by Native Americans, such as Quercus kelloggii (California black oak), may be easier to prepare or more palatable.

Roasted acorn flour is a main ingredient in sweet cakes special to Kurdish areas of Iran and Iraq.

==== Coffee substitute ====
Ground and roasted acorns are sometimes used to make coffee substitute, although they contain no caffeine and taste little or not at all like coffee. During the blockade of Germany in World War I, various substitute goods were produced to alleviate supply shortages; among them were numerous ersatz coffee formations, some of them contained roasted acorns.

==== Use by Native Americans ====
Acorns are a traditional food of many indigenous peoples of North America, and long served an especially important role for Californian Native Americans, where the ranges of several species of oaks overlap, increasing the reliability of the resource. One ecology researcher of Yurok and Karuk heritage reports that "his traditional acorn preparation is a simple soup, cooked with hot stones directly in a basket", and says he enjoys acorns eaten with "grilled salmon, huckleberries or seaweed".

In the San Francisco Bay Area acorns found were often associated with grinding tools. Stone tools like hammerstone and anvil, millingstones, and mortar and pestle help crack open the acorn and grind the acorn into dust.

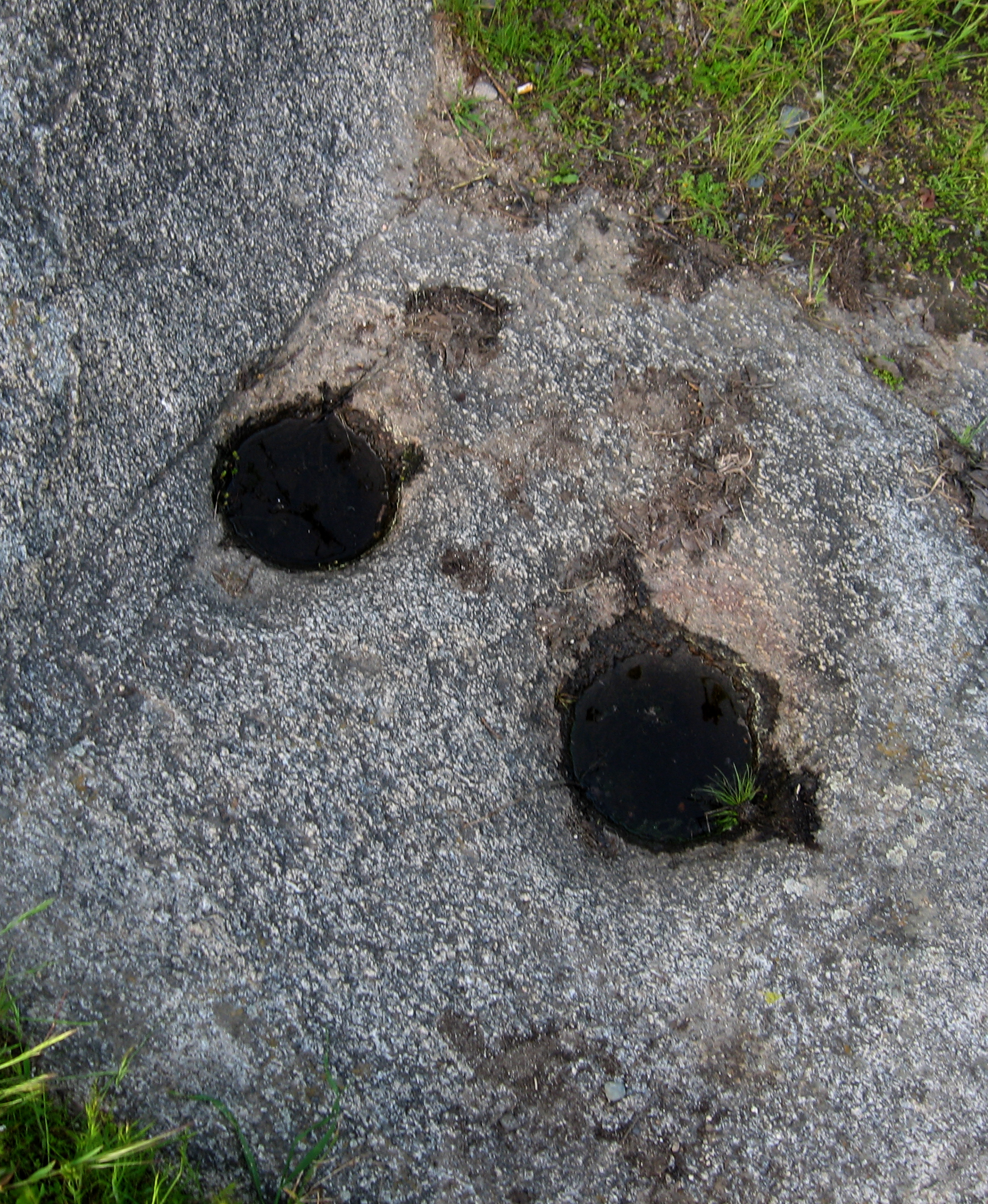
Mortar holes for pounding acorns into flour, Lost Lake, California

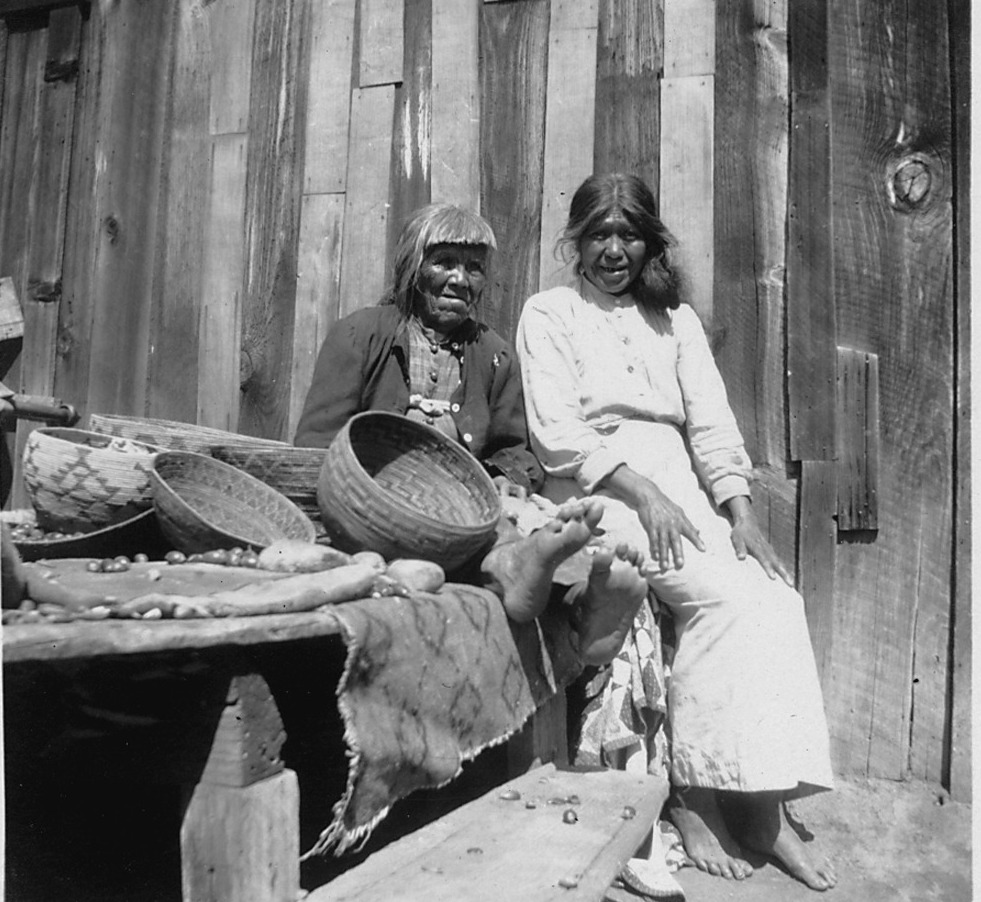
Chuckachancy women pause in their work preparing acorns for grinding, California, c. 1920

=== In culture ===
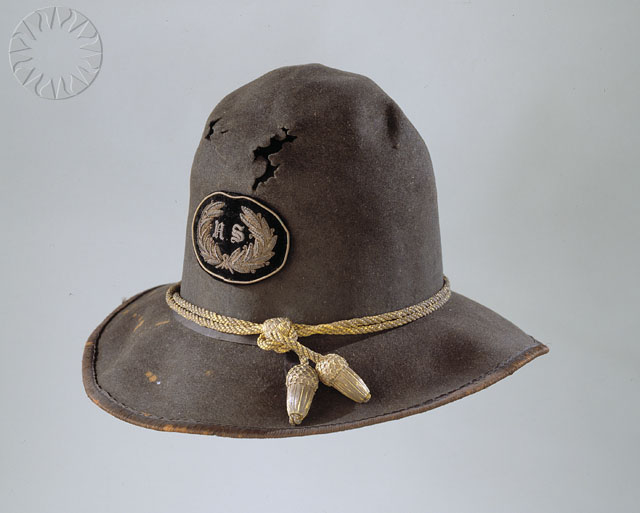
Campaign hat worn by General Sherman

Acorns and balanophagy (acorn-eating [fr]) were associated with ideas of primitive life and Arcadia in classical literature and beyond.

==== Art ====
A motif in Roman architecture, also popular in Celtic and Scandinavian art, the acorn symbol is used as an ornament on cutlery, furniture, and jewelry; it also appears on finials at Westminster Abbey.

==== Military symbolism ====
The acorn was used frequently by both Union and Confederate forces during the American Civil War. Modern US Army Cavalry Scout campaign hats still retain traces of the acorn today.

==== Modern uses as symbol ====
The acorn is the symbol for the National Trails of England and Wales, and is used for the waymarks on these paths. The acorn, specifically that of the white oak, is also present in the symbol for the University of Connecticut.

Acorns are also used as charges in heraldry.

Acorn waymark for National Trails in England and Wales

Acorn in the coat of arms of Kirchardt

Oak branch with two acorns in the coat of arms of Tammela

== See also ==
- Knopper gall
- Dotori-muk
