= Tangpyeong-chae =

Korean salad dish

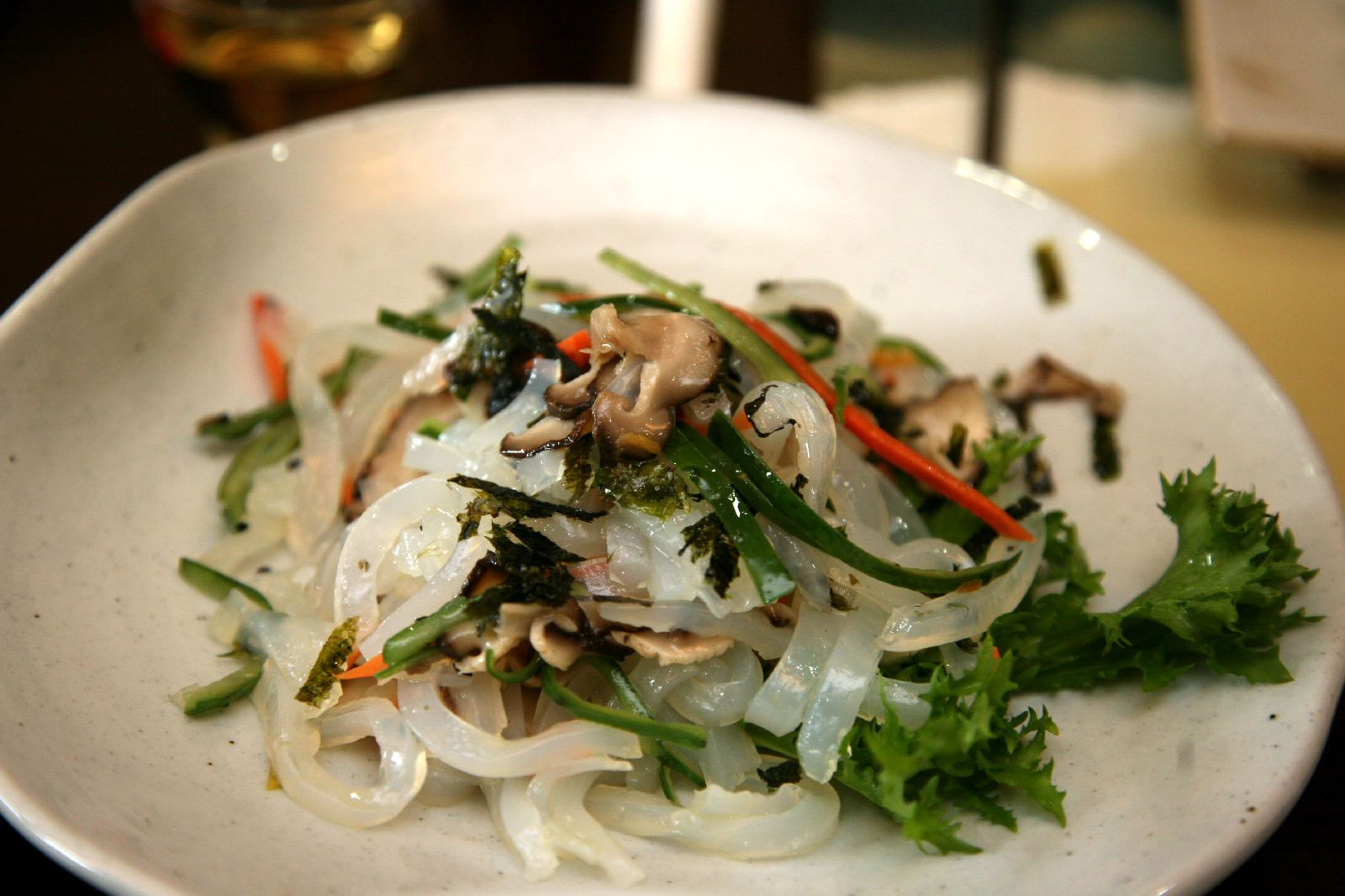
- Alternative names: Mung bean jelly salad
- Type: Namul
- Place of origin: Korea
- Main ingredients: Nokdumuk (mung bean jelly)
- Ingredients generally used: Mung bean sprouts, Java water dropwort, shredded meat (beef, pork, sea cucumber, or abalone)

Korean name
- Hangul: 탕평채; 묵청포
- Hanja: 蕩平菜; 묵淸泡
- RR: tangpyeongchae; mukcheongpo
- MR: t'angp'yŏngch'ae; mukch'ŏngp'o
- IPA: [tʰaŋ.pʰjʌŋ.tɕʰɛ̝]; [muk̚.tɕʰʌŋ.pʰo]

Tangpyeong-chae (Korean: 탕평채; Hanja: 蕩平菜) or mung bean jelly salad is a Korean dish that was part of the Korean royal court cuisine. It is made by mixing julienned nokdumuk, mung bean sprouts, water dropwort, stir-fried shredded beef, thinly shredded red pepper and lightly broiled gim. Tangpyeongchae is seasoned with a sauce made with ganjang, vinegar, sugar, sesame seeds and sesame oil. The dish is most often eaten in late spring and summer.

== History ==
According to Tongguksesigi, a book written in 1849, tangpyeongchae derived from a political situation. King Yeongjo of the Joseon period was concerned about severe conflicts between political parties. Therefore, he tried to resolve the strife between major four parties by frequently holding feasts to make the mood friendly. The Tangpyeong policy (탕평책; 蕩平策) which literally means the policy for "harmony" and "meditation" is regarded as his greatest achievement. He selected people regardless of their party affiliation.

At the beginning of the feast, the king presented tangpyeongchae before the government officers and other politicians, and then said, "As you see, there are four different ingredients (nokdumuk, gim, beef and dropwort) that have four distinguishable colors and flavors. But they are harmonized so well that they taste beautiful together." His speech was a great lesson to all those who participated in that party.
