= Liangfen =

Chinese jelly made of mung bean starch

- Sichuan-style chuanbei liangfen
- Traditional Chinese: 涼粉
- Simplified Chinese: 凉粉
- Hanyu Pinyin: liángfěn
- Literal meaning: cool flour [i. e. noodle]
Transcriptions
Standard Mandarin
- Hanyu Pinyin: liángfěn
Yue: Cantonese
- Yale Romanization: lèuhng fán
- Jyutping: loeng⁴ fan²

Liangfen (simplified Chinese: 凉粉; traditional Chinese: 涼粉; pinyin: liángfěn; lit. 'cool rice noodles'), also spelled liang fen, is a Chinese legume dish consisting of starch jelly that is usually served cold, with a savory sauce, often in the summer. It is most popular in northern China, including Beijing, Gansu, and Shaanxi, but may also be found in Sichuan and Qinghai. In Tibet and Nepal it is called laping and is a common street vendor food. In Kyrgyzstan it is an ingredient in a noodle dish called ashlan fu.

Liangfen is generally white or off-white in color, translucent, and thick. It is usually made from mung bean starch, but may also be made from pea or potato starch. In western China, the jelly-like seeds of Plantago major were formerly also used. The starch is boiled with water and the resulting sheets are then cut into thick strips.

Liangfen is generally served cold. The liangfen strips are tossed with seasonings including soy sauce, vinegar, sesame paste, crushed garlic, julienned carrot, and chili oil. In Lanzhou it is often served stir-fried. In Sichuan, a spicy dish called chuanbei liangfen is particularly popular (see photo above).

Similar foods include the Korean muk made with buckwheat, mung bean, or water chestnut starch and Japanese tokoroten.

Jidou liangfen, a similar dish from the Yunnan province of southwest China, is made from chickpeas rather than mung beans. It is similar to Burmese tofu salad.

In Northeast China, it is called lapi (拉皮) and is served mixed with julienned vegetables.

== See also ==
- Liang pi
- Laping
- Mung bean sheets
