= Laping =

Tibetan noodle dish

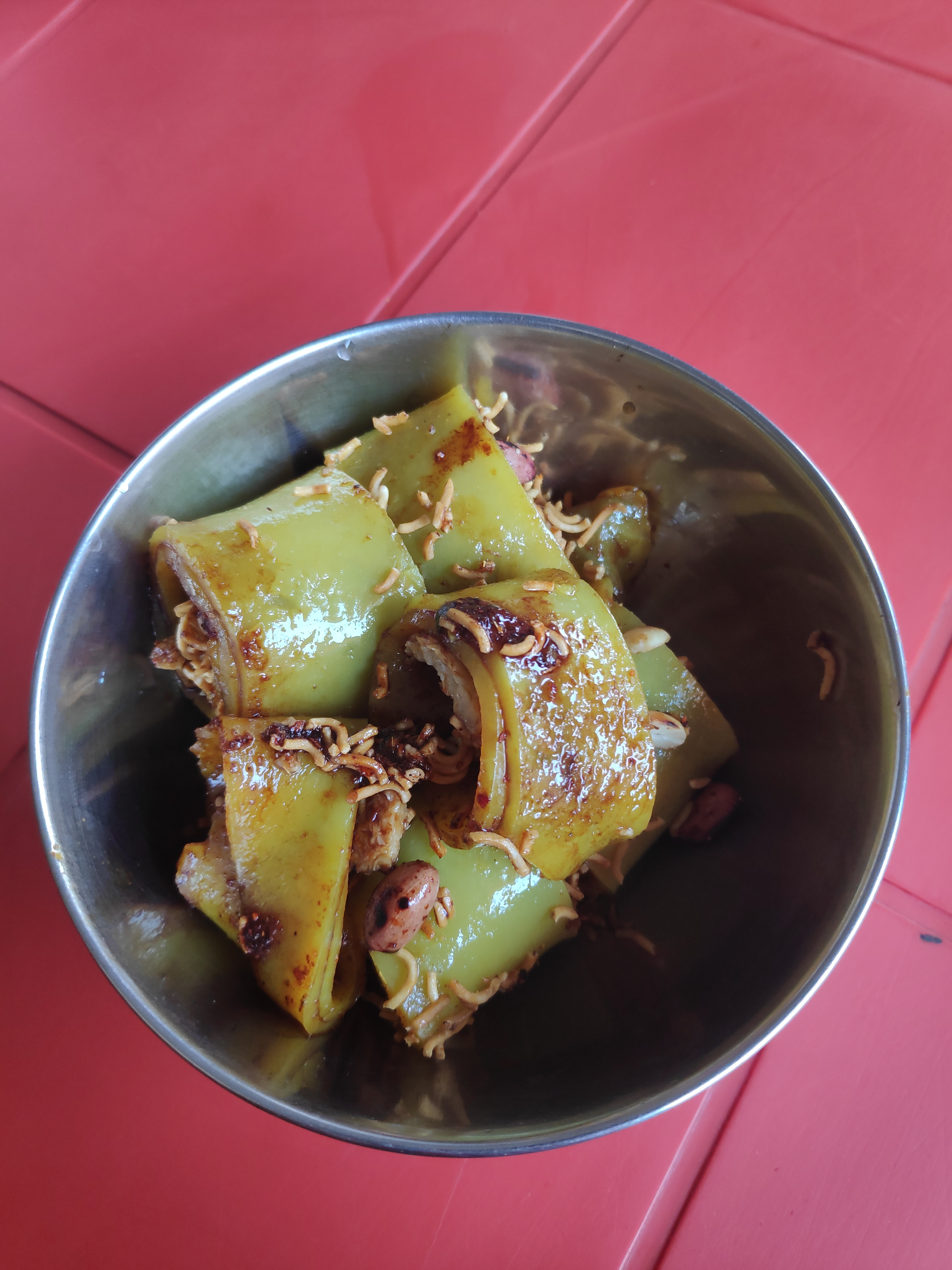
- Type: Noodle dish
- Place of origin: Tibet, Nepal

Laping or Laphing (Tibetan: ལ་ཕིང) is a spicy cold plain flour noodle dish in Tibetan cuisine. It is made of mung bean starch. It is garnished with tsulazi (chilli oil), soy sauce, and vinegar, and can be eaten with red chilli, coriander, or green onions.

Laping derives from the Sichuan-style liangfen. Originating in Tibet, it became widely popular when Tibetan refugees introduced the dish in Nepal as a street food.

== Origin and popularity ==
Laphing is closely related to a Chinese cold starch dish called liangfen. Liangfen was long eaten as a street food in parts of northern and western China, including Gansu and Shaanxi. The dish travelled westwards onto the Tibetan plateau, where it evolved locally and became a part of Tibetan food culture and also got its name, Laphing (where "La" means cold, and "Phing" means jelly-like texture).

Laphing was introduced in Nepal during the 1959 Tibetan uprising when Tibetan refugee communities established themselves in Nepal, particularly in the Boudha area of Kathmandu Valley. Initially, laphing was primarily associated with the Tibetan community and was mostly found in areas where they lived. It was only around the mid-2000s where the dish gained popularity and became a mainstream street food, spreading throughout the Nepalese community. In Nepal, Laphing is found in many variations compared to the traditional style of Tibet.

== Gallery ==
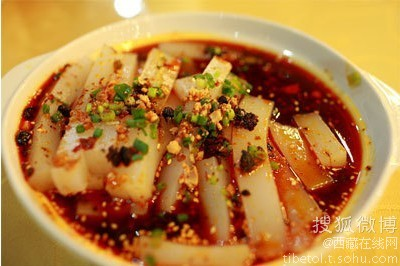
Tibetan Fast Food Laping

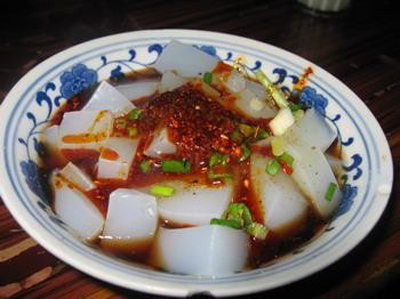
Laping

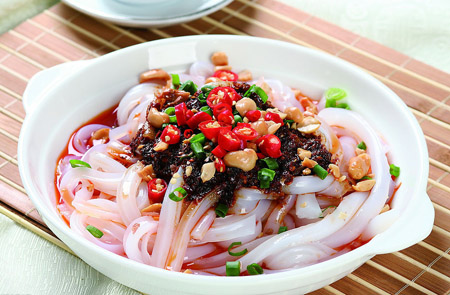
Tibetan street food

== See also ==
- Liangpi
- Cheung fun
- Liangfen
- Nokdu-muk
