= Dotori-muk =

Korean acorn starch jelly dish

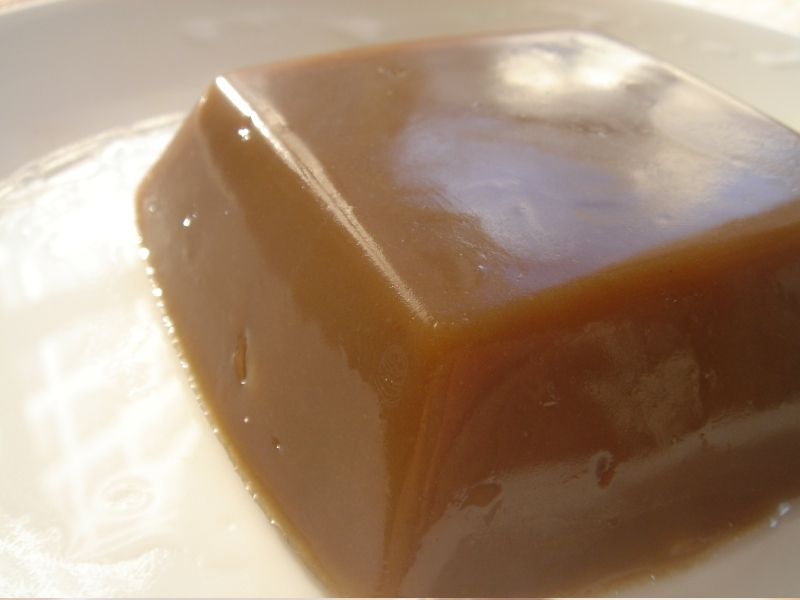
- Alternative names: Acorn jelly
- Type: Muk
- Place of origin: Korea
- Main ingredients: Acorn

Korean name
- Hangul: 도토리묵
- RR: dotorimuk
- MR: tot'orimuk
- IPA: to.tʰo.ɾi.muk̚

Dotori-muk (Korean: 도토리묵; pronounced [to.tʰo.ɾi.muk̚]) or acorn jelly is a Korean jelly (묵 muk) (Note: 묵 muk encompasses any solidified foods including fishcakes (어묵 eo-muk i.e. 'fish muk') and tofu (콩묵 kong-muk i.e. 'soy muk').) dish made from acorn starch, which has a high degree of gelatinization. This muk originated in ancient times, when oak trees in mountains across Korea produced acorns each autumn abundant enough as a viable source of food. Dotori-muk does not spoil easily, its long shelf life advantageous as a food suitable for long travels.

== Production ==
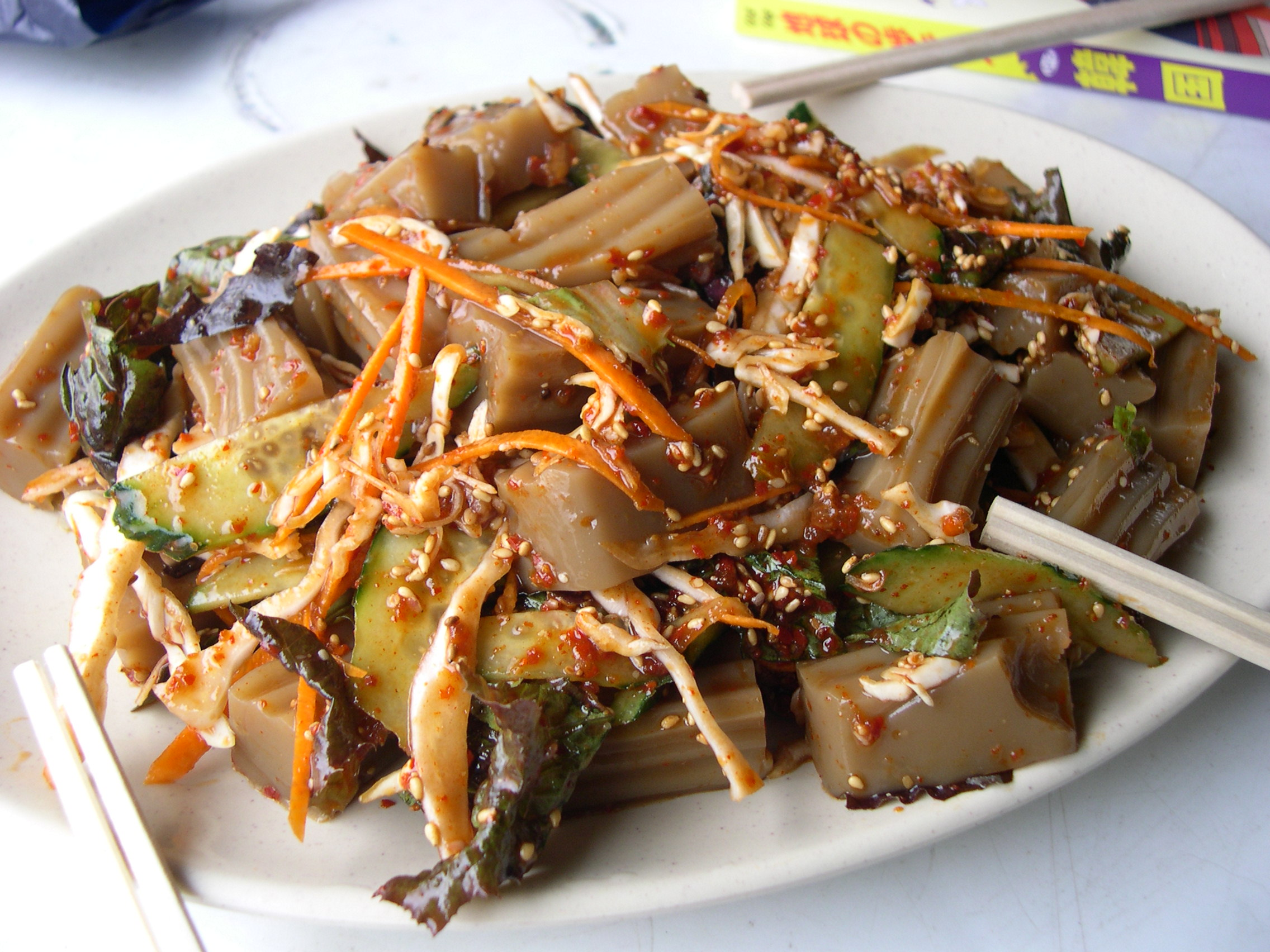
Seasoned dotori-muk

Despite being a rich source of starch and proteins, acorns contain large amounts of tannins and other polyphenols, which prevent the human body from digesting them properly. Harvested acorns must be properly leached of the tannins prior to consumption.

Acorns are either collected directly from the ground or knocked off the tree branches. The acorns are opened and the nutmeat ground into a fine orange-brown paste. The paste is then stirred into vats of water and the acorns' fiber is separated from the starch through sieving and settling. The starch-water mixture is collected and allowed to sit so that the tannins in the starch diffuse into the water, which is changed several times. The overall soaking time depends on the amount of tannin in the paste.

The now-tannin-free starch-water suspension should have an off-white colour. This starch is allowed to completely settle at the bottom of the vat, the water drained away and the paste collected in trays to dry. The dried starch cake is then pulverized and packaged for sale. Dotori-muk is also commercially available in powdered form, which must be mixed with water, boiled until pudding-like in consistency, then set in a flat dish.

== Serving ==
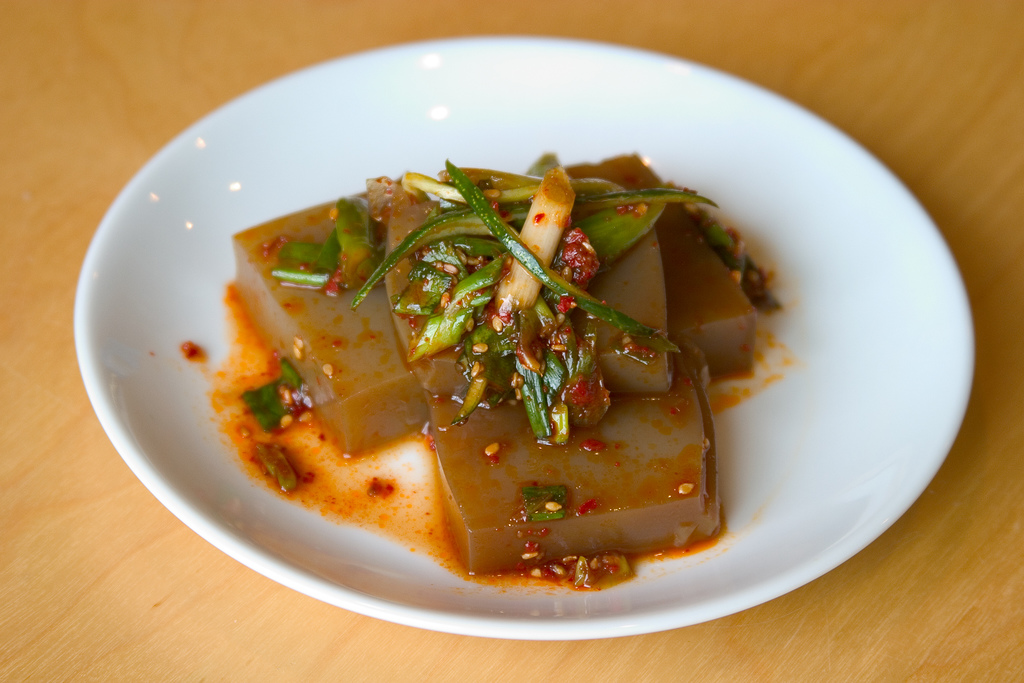
Dotori-muk-muchim (acorn jelly salad)

Like other muk, dotori-muk is most commonly eaten in the form of dotori-muk-muchim (도토리묵무침), a side dish in which small chunks of dotori-muk are seasoned and mixed with other ingredients such as slivered carrots and scallions, garlic, soy sauce, sesame oil, red chili powder, and sesame seeds.

Muk-mari (묵말이) is also famous. In the Gujeuk neighbourhood of Daejeon, a "muk alley" took shape around the popular muk restaurant 'Grandma's House' (할머니집) founded in the late 1960s. At Expo '93 in Daejeon, Gujeuk dotori-muk was designated a representative local food and became nationally known. Muk cooking made by a woman started attracting people's attention. In particular, Muk-mari is made of salted seaweed (chopped seaweed powder) with its rich texture and is made of dried acorn.

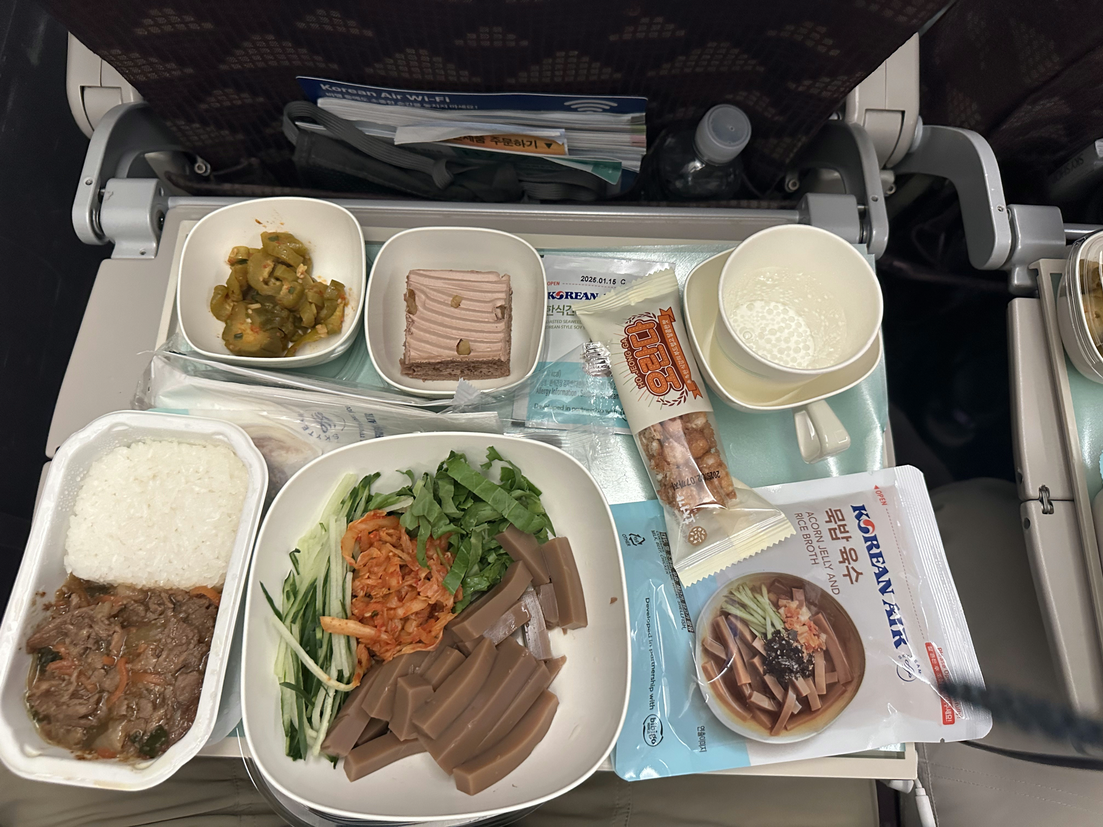
Dotori-muk served onboard a Korean Air flight

== History ==
During the first of the Japanese invasions of Joseon, King Seonjo took refuge in the north. Food shortages due to the invasion made it difficult for the villagers to find something to serve the king and his entourage, so they hurriedly made them dotori-muk. Later, even after returning to the palace, King Seonjo often ate dotori-muk as a sign that he would not forget the hardships of the war.

== See also ==
- Nokdumuk – made from mung beans
- Hwangpomuk – a yellow-colored jelly made from mung beans
- Memilmuk – made from buckwheat
- Konjac – a Japanese jelly
