= Serratia marcescens nuclease =

Class of enzymes

Identifiers
- EC no.: 3.1.30.2
- CAS no.: 9025-65-4

Databases
- IntEnz: IntEnz view
- BRENDA: BRENDA entry
- ExPASy: NiceZyme view
- KEGG: KEGG entry
- MetaCyc: metabolic pathway
- PRIAM: profile
- PDB structures: RCSB PDB PDBe PDBsum
Search
- PMC: articles
- PubMed: articles
- NCBI: proteins

Serratia marcescens nuclease

Identifiers
- Organism: Serratia marcescens
- Symbol: nucA
- UniProt: P13717
Search for
- Structures: Swiss-model
- Domains: InterPro

Serratia marcescens nuclease (EC 3.1.30.2, endonuclease (Serratia marcescens), barley nuclease, plant nuclease I, nucleate endonuclease) is an enzyme. This enzyme catalyses the following chemical reaction

Endonucleolytic cleavage to 5′-phosphomononucleotide and 5′-phosphooligonucleotide end-products

Hydrolyses double- or single-stranded substrate DNA or RNA. It is a representative of the DNA/RNA non-specific endonuclease family.

It is commercially available.

== Characteristics ==
Serratia nuclease was first purified from its native source in 1969. It was cloned in 1987 and shown to consist of a 266 protein precursor, which is further cleaved and secreted as a 245 amino acid active nuclease. Its active form in solution is a homodimer. It has two disulfide bonds, the first between cysteine 30 and 34 and the second between cysteine 222 and 264. Reduction of these disulfides or site directed mutagenesis of their residues to serine, specifically the first one, leads to a large loss in nuclease activity, and a loss of the ability to reversibly regain activity after inactivating 40–60 °C heat treatments. It has a much higher catalytic efficiency than other nucleases, about 4 times greater than staphylococcal nuclease, and about 34 times greater than bovine pancreatic DNase I. The enzyme cleaves single or double stranded DNA and RNA with similar rates, so long as the substrate DNA or RNA contains no fewer than 5 nucleotides (or basepairs). Magnesium(II) (Mg^{2+}) is an essential cofactor for its nuclease activity. Serratia nuclease is activated by up to 4 M urea. At 5 M urea the initial activity is decreased from its peak although still above its baseline, and the enzyme is significantly inhibited after 60 minutes. At 6 M urea, the nuclease activity is below baseline and almost completely inactivated within 60 minutes. At 7 M the nuclease becomes essentially completely inactivated within 15 minutes, but significant and workable degradation of nucleic acids can occur before the nuclease is inactivated. 8 M urea causes a complete inactivation of the enzyme within 5 minutes.

=== Optimal conditions ===
Condition	Optimal^{1}	Effective^{2}
Mg^{2+} concentration	1–2 mM	1–10 mM
pH	8.2–9.2	6.0–10.0
Temperature	37 °C	0–42 °C
Dithiothreitol (DTT)	< 100 mM	> 100 mM
β-Mercaptoethanol (BME)	< 100 mM	> 100 mM
Monovalent cation concentration (Na^{+}, K^{+}, etc.)	0–20 mM	0–150 mM
PO^{3−}_{4}	0–10 mM	0–100 mM
Urea	< 4 M	> 4 M

1. "Optimal" is the condition in which Serratia nuclease retains over 90% of its activity.

2. "Effective" is the condition in which Serratia nuclease retains over 15% of its activity.

=== Inhibitory conditions ===
Some inhibitory conditions are known:

- > 300 mM monovalent cations (Na^{+}, K^{+}, etc.)
- > 100 mM phosphate
- > 100 mM ammonium sulfate
- > 100 mM guanidine HCl
- > 2 mM EDTA
- > 4 mM EGTA
- > 0.4% w/v Triton X-100 (no effect below 0.4%, slight activation above 0.4%)
- > 0.4% w/v Sodium deoxycholate (70% activity at 0.4%, steady inactivation below and above 0.4%)
- > 0.1% w/v SDS (inactivation kinetics allow for Serratia nuclease to still degrade some nucleic acids before inactivation)

== Use in biotechnology ==
Given its high activity, high stability & reversible inactivation to heat treatments, rate enhancement or otherwise compatibility with some denaturing reagents like urea, Serratia nuclease was recognized early on to have industrial & commercialization potential. A patent covering the recombinant expression of Serratia nuclease in E. coli was submitted by Benzon Pharma in 1986, granted in 1992, & expired in 2006. This recombinant Serratia nuclease was commercialized as Benzonase, and is still available from and a registered trademark of Merck KGaA. Notably, the patented sequence for Benzonase is slightly different (1 amino acid substitution) from the Serratia marcescens nuclease which was cloned publicly.

As the benzonase patent is now expired, and in fact was never submitted nor granted in the United States, several commercial alternatives for recombinantly produced Serratia marcescens nuclease are now available:

- Basemuncher, from Westburg Life Sciences
- Benzo Nuclease, from Tinzyme
- Benz-Neburase, from GenScript
- Decontaminase, from AG Scientific
- Denarase, from c-LEcta
- Dr. Nuclease, from Syd Labs
- GENIUS Nuclease, from ACROBiosystems
- Pierce Universal Nuclease, from Thermo Fisher Scientific
- TurboNuclease, from Accelagen
- MaxNuclease™, from KACTUS

(A current notable non-producer is New England Biolabs)

== See also ==
- DNase I (bovine pancreatic)
- Micrococcal nuclease
- Mung bean nuclease
- Nuclease P1
