= Plasmodium RUF2 RNA =

Plasmodium RNA of unknown function 2
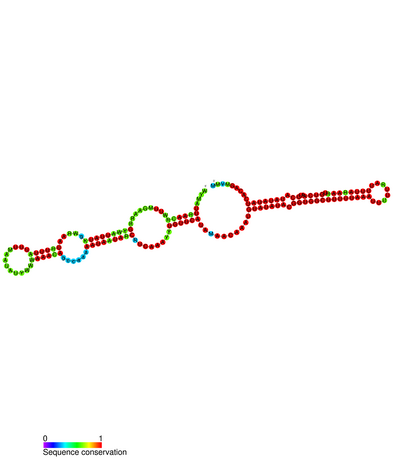
- Predicted secondary structure of RUF2

Identifiers
- Symbol: RUF2
- Rfam: RF01579

Other data
- RNA type: sRNA
- Domain(s): Plasmodium
- PDB structures: PDBe

RUF2 is a non-coding RNA (ncRNA) present within the plasmodium genome. Bioinformatic studies predicted that RUF2 was present within the plasmodium genome and the expression of this ncRNA was verified by Northern Blot. The location of this ncRNAs was subsequently mapped within the P. falciparum strain 3DF genome by primer extension. RUF2 is a novel RNA of unknown function but has shown to contain some structural similarity with the H/ACA box snoRNA but no known targets have been identified.
