= Plasmodium RUF3 RNA =

RUF3 is a non-coding RNA(ncRNA) present within the plasmodium genome. Bioinformatic studies predicted that RUF3 was present within the plasmodium genome and the expression of this ncRNA was verified by Northern Blot. The location of these ncRNAs was subsequently mapped within the P. falciparum strain 3DF genome by primer extension. RUF3 is a novel RNA of unknown function that has been shown to contain some structural similarity with the H/ACA box snoRNA, but no known targets have been identified.
