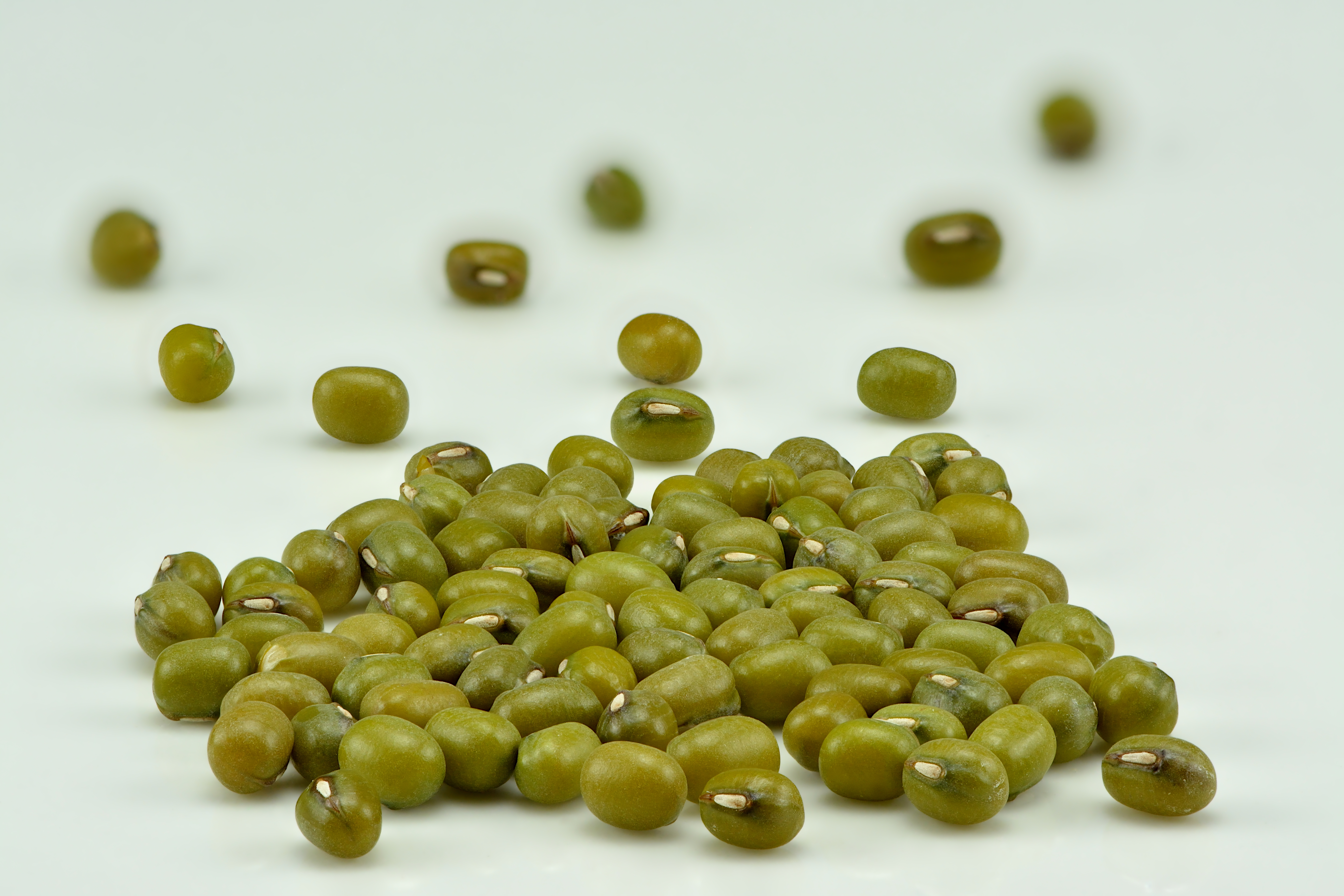
- Mung beans
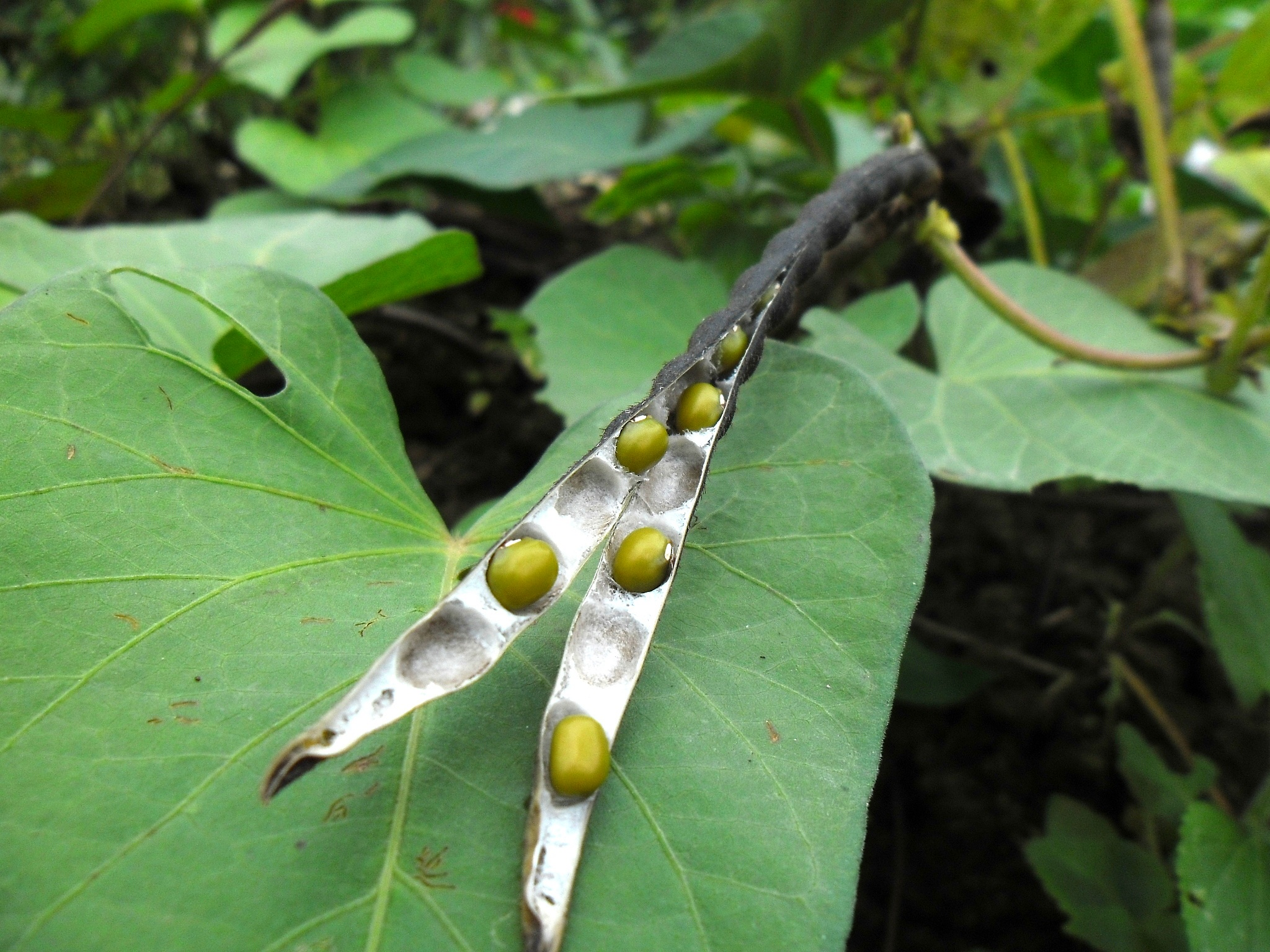
- Dried and opened mung bean pod

Scientific classification
- Kingdom: Plantae
- Clade: Tracheophytes
- Clade: Angiosperms
- Clade: Eudicots
- Clade: Rosids
- Order: Fabales
- Family: Fabaceae
- Subfamily: Faboideae
- Genus: Vigna
- Species: V. radiata

Binomial name
- Vigna radiata (L.) R. Wilczek

Synonyms
- Azukia radiata (L.) Ohwi; Phaseolus abyssinicus Savi; Phaseolus chanetii (H.Lev.) H.Lev.; Phaseolus hirtus Retz.; Phaseolus novo-guineense Baker f.; Phaseolus radiatus L.; Phaseolus setulosus Dalzell; Phaseolus sublobatus Roxb.; Phaseolus trinervius Wight & Arn.; Pueraria chanetii H.Lev.; Rudua aurea (Roxb.) F.Maek.; Rudua aurea (Roxb.) Maekawa; Vigna brachycarpa Kurz; Vigna opistricha A.Rich.; Vigna perrieriana R.Vig.; Vigna sublobata (Roxb.) Babu & S.K.Sharma; Vigna sublobata (Roxb.) Bairig. & al.

= Mung bean =

Species of plant

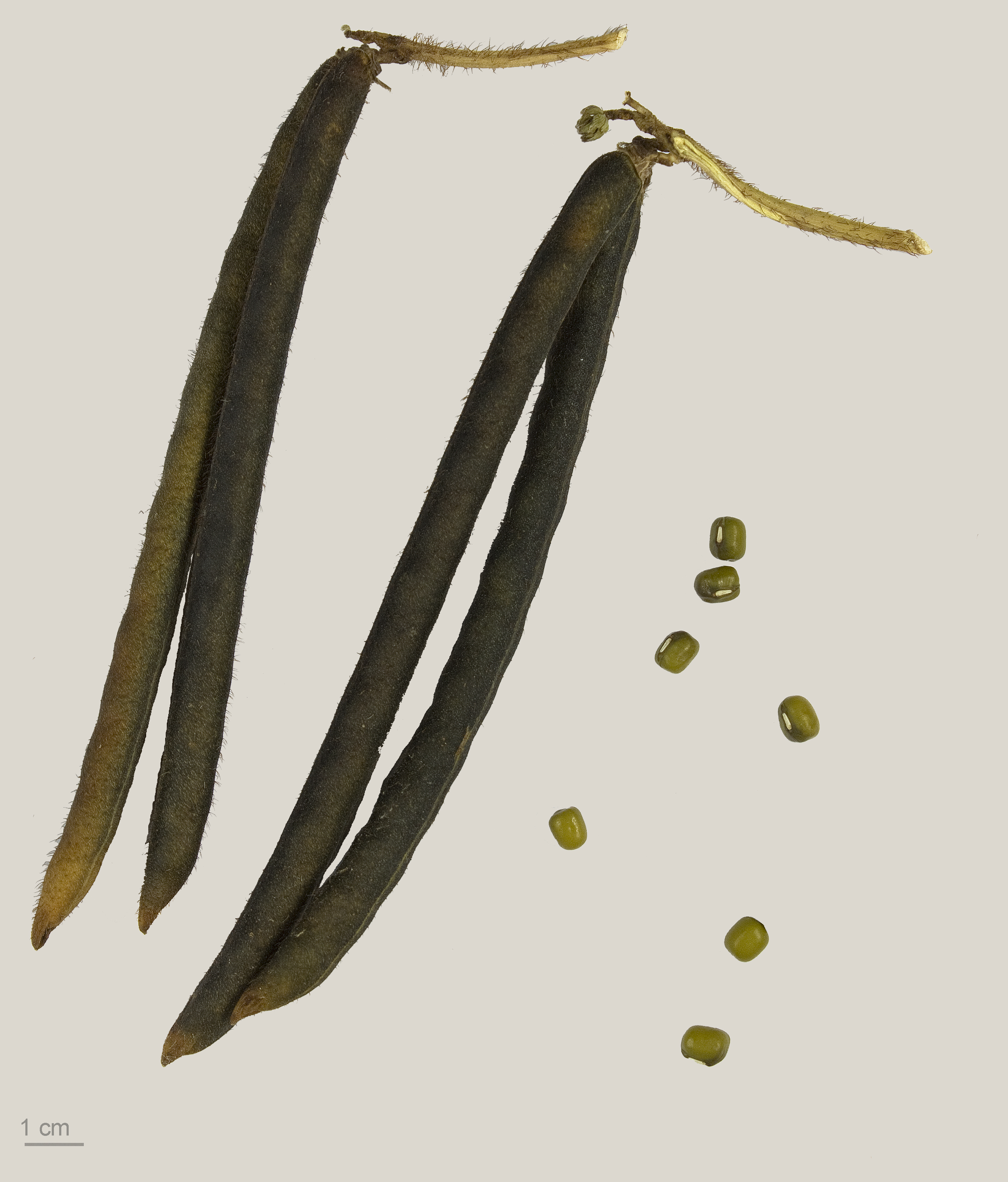
Vigna radiata - MHNT

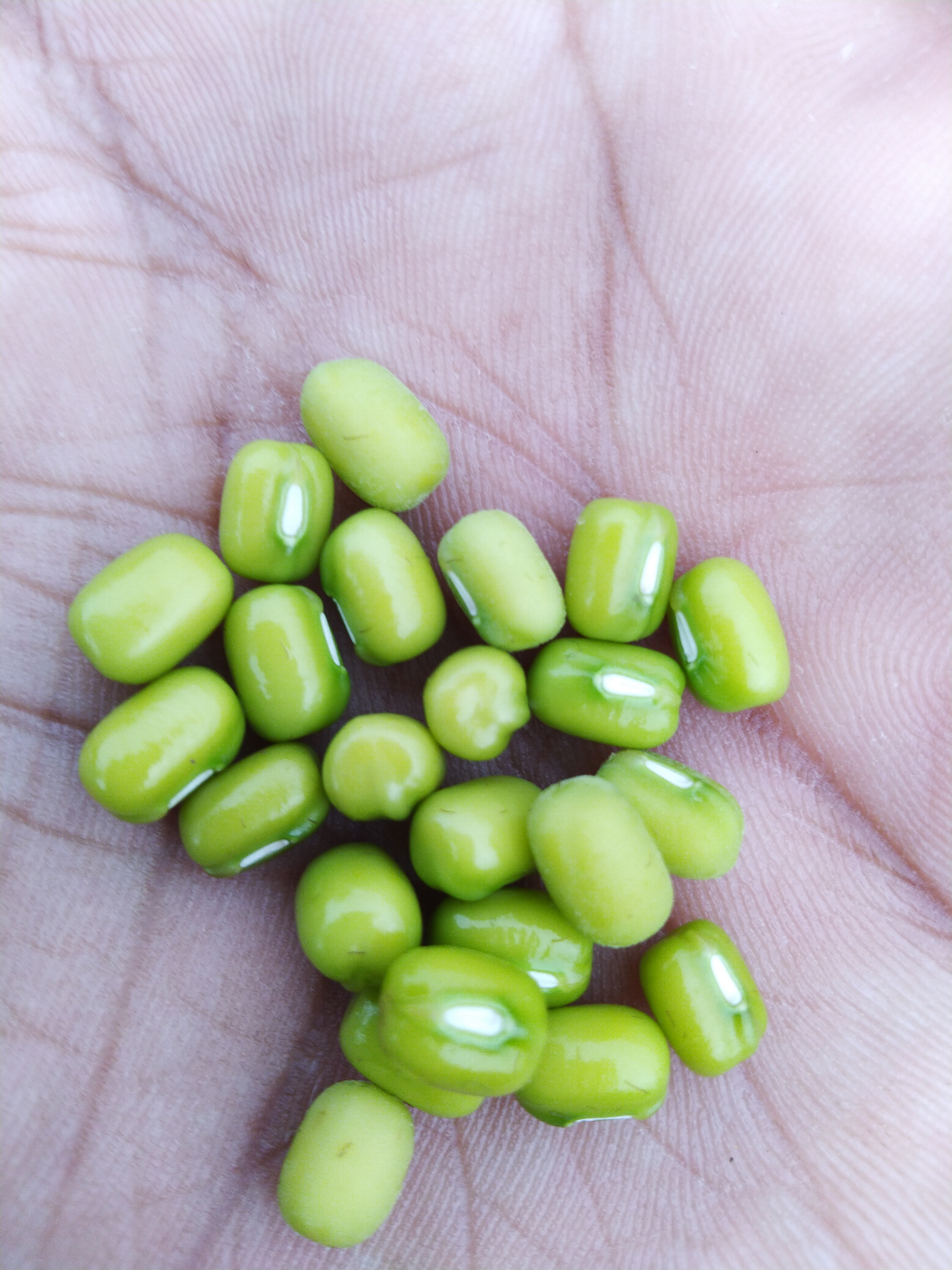
Mung seeds from Deccan Plateau, India

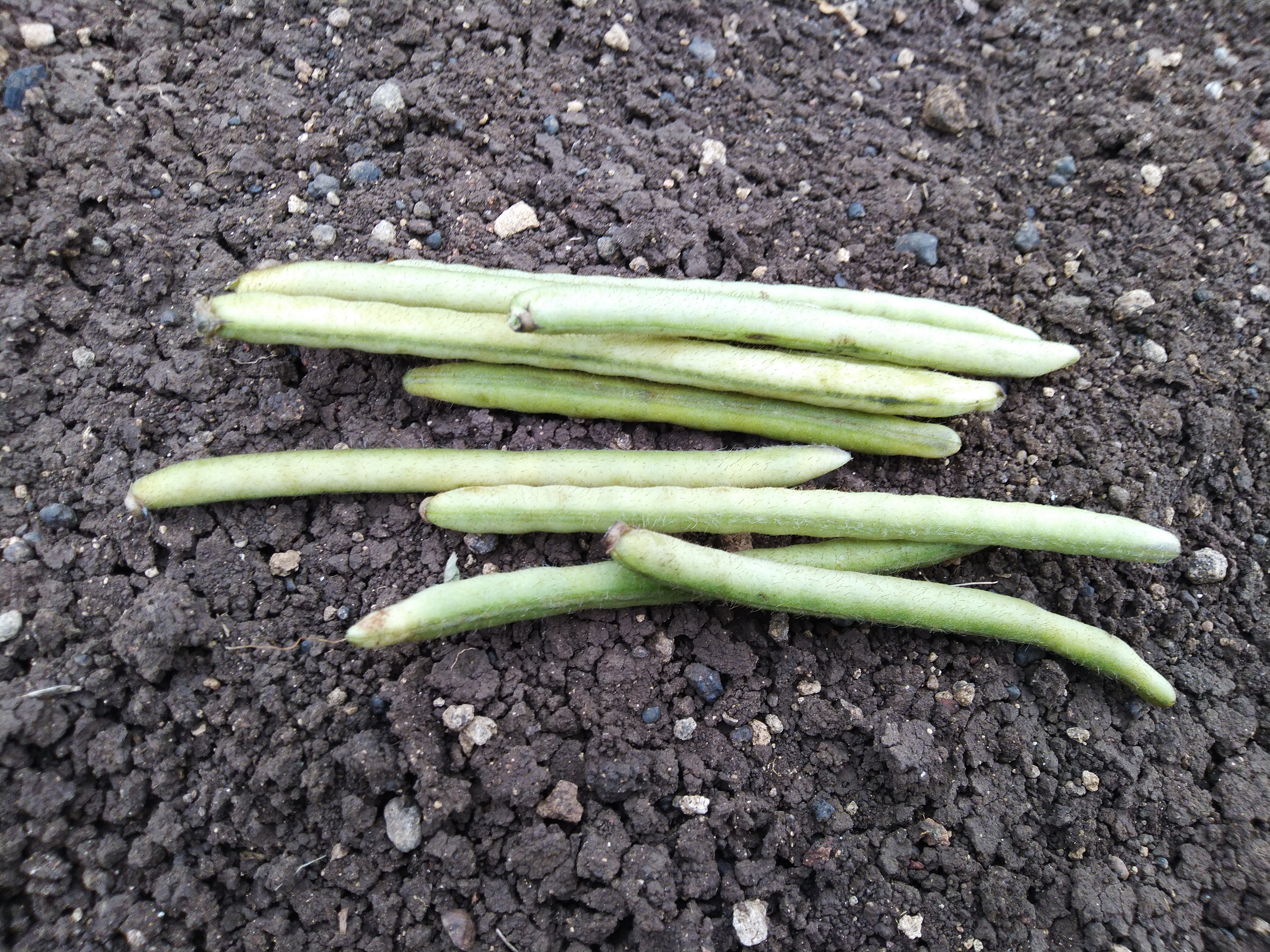
Mung legumes from India

The mung bean or green gram (Vigna radiata) is a plant species in the legume family. It is mainly cultivated in East, Southeast, and in South Asia and used as an ingredient in both savoury and sweet dishes.

== Names ==
The English names "mung" or "mungo" originated from the Hindi word mūṅg (मूंग), which is derived from the Sanskrit word mudga (मुद्ग). It is also known in Philippine English as "mongo bean". Other less common English names include "golden gram" and "Jerusalem pea".

== Description ==
The green gram is an annual vine with yellow flowers and fuzzy brown pods. It has a height of about 15–125 cm (6–49 in).

Mung bean has a well-developed root system. The lateral roots are many and slender, with root nodules grown. Stems are much branched, sometimes twining at the tips. Young stems are purple or green, and mature stems are grayish-yellow or brown. They can be divided into erect cespitose, semi-trailing and trailing types. Wild types tend to be prostrate while cultivated types are more erect.

Leaves are ovoid or broad-ovoid, cotyledons die after emergence, and ternate leaves are produced on two single leaves. The leaves are 6–12 cm long and 5–10 cm wide. Racemes with yellow flowers are borne in the axils and tips of the leaves, with 10–25 flowers per pedicel, self-pollinated. The fruits are elongated cylindrical or flat cylindrical pods, usually 30–50 per plant. The pods are 5–10 cm long and 0.4–0.6 cm wide and contain 12–14 septum-separated seeds, which can be either cylindrical or spherical in shape, and green, yellow, brown, or blue in color. Seed colors and presence or absence of a rough layer are used to distinguish different types of mung bean.

=== Growth stages ===
Germination is typically within 4–5 days, but the actual rate varies according to the amount of moisture introduced during the germination stage. It is epigeal, with the stem and cotyledons emerging from the seedbed.

After germination, the seed splits, and a soft, whitish root grows. Mung bean sprouts are harvested during this stage. If not harvested, it develops a root system, then a green stem which contains two leaves and shoots up from the soil. After that, seed pods begin to form on its branches, with 10–15 seeds contained in each pod.

The maturation can take up to 60 days. It can reach up to 76 cm (30 in) tall, with multiple branches with seed pods. Most of the seed pods become darker, while some remain green.

=== Similar species ===
Vigna radiata is sometimes confused with Vigna mungo (black gram) due to their similar morphology.

== Taxonomy ==
Mung beans are one of many species moved from the genus Phaseolus to Vigna in the 1970s. The previous names were Phaseolus aureus or P. radiatus.

It is a species of Fabaceae and is also known as green gram.

There are three subgroups, including one cultivated (V. radiata subsp. radiata) and two wild ones (V. radiata subsp. sublobata and V. radiata subsp. glabra).

== Ecology ==
=== Nitrogen fixation and cover crop ===
As a legume plant, mung bean is in symbiotic association with Rhizobia, which enables it to fix atmospheric nitrogen (58–109 kg per ha mung bean). It can provide large amounts of biomass (7.16 t biomass/ha) and nitrogen to the soil (ranging from 30 to 251 kg/ha). The nitrogen fixation ability not only enables it to meet its own nitrogen requirement, but also benefits the succeeding crops. It can be used as a cover crop before or after cereal crops in rotation, which makes a good green manure.

== Domestication ==
Time-lapse video of mung beans germinating over 10 days

The mung bean was domesticated in India, where its progenitor (Vigna radiata subspecies sublobata) occurs wild.

2nd millennium BCE scripture Yajurveda in its 4th chapter refers to mudga (मुद्ग) as one of the important grains and asks Rudra to bless with its good harvest (मु॒द्गाश्च॑ मे॒ खल्वा॑श्च मे) in Rudradhyaya. The mung bean is listed as one of the nine auspicious grains (navdhānya) in Vedic astrology and associated with planet Budha (Mercury).

Carbonized mung beans have been discovered in many archeological sites in India. Areas with early finds include the eastern zone of the Harappan civilisation in modern-day Pakistan and western and northwestern India, where finds date back about 4,500 years, and South India in the modern state of Karnataka where finds date back more than 4,000 years. Some scholars, therefore, infer two separate domestications in the northwest and south of India. On the other hand, a recent study suggested a single genetic origin likely contributing to the loss of pod shattering, the key domestication trait in legumes. In South India, there is evidence for the evolution of larger-seeded mung beans 3,500 to 3,000 years ago. By about 3,500 years ago mung beans were widely cultivated throughout India.

Cultivated mung beans later spread from India to China and Southeast Asia. Archaeobotanical research at the site of Khao Sam Kaeo in southern Thailand indicates that mung beans had arrived in Thailand by at least 2,200 years ago.

A genetic study demonstrated that, following its domestication in South Asia, mung bean spread sequentially to Southeast Asia and East Asia and eventually to Central Asia, despite the geographic proximity of South and Central Asia. The study suggests that the short and dry growing seasons in the northern regions of Asia were not suitable for southern cultivars, which had been bred for extended life cycles to maximize yield. This highlights the critical role of ecological factors, such as climate, in shaping crops evolution.

== Cultivation ==
=== Varieties ===
The mung bean varieties now are mainly targeted in resistance to pests and diseases, particularly the bean weevil and mung bean yellow mosaic virus (MYMV). For now, the main varieties include Samrat, IPM2-3, SML 668 and Meha in India; Crystal, Jade-AU, Celera-AU，Satin II，Regur in Australia; Zhonglv No. 1, Zhonglv No. 2, Jilv No. 2, Jilv No. 7, Weilv No. 4, Jihong 9218, Jihong 8937, Bao 876-16, Bao 8824-17 in China. Also, with the help of the World Vegetable Center, the traits of mung bean have been considerably improved.

'Summer Moong' is a short-duration mung bean pulse crop grown in northern India. Due to its short duration, it can fit well in-between of many cropping systems. It is mainly cultivated in East and Southeast Asia and the Indian subcontinent. It is considered to be the hardiest of all pulse crops and requires a hot climate for germination and growth.

=== Climate and soil requirements ===
Mung bean is a warm-season and frost-intolerant plant. Mung bean is suitable for being planted in temperate, sub-tropical and tropical regions. The most suitable temperature for mung bean's germination and growth is 15–18 °C (59–64 °F). Mung bean has high adaptability to various soil types, while the best pH of the soil is between 6.2 and 7.2. Mung bean is a short-day plant and long days will delay its flowering and podding.

=== Harvest ===
The yield potential of mung bean is around 2.5 to 3.0 t/ha, however, usually due to the resistance to environmental stress and improper management, the average productivity for mung bean is only 0.5 t/ha. Due to the indeterminate flowering habit of mung bean, when facing proper environmental conditions, there can be both flowers and pods in one mung bean plant, which makes it difficult to harvest it. The perfect harvesting stage is when 90% of the pods' colour in one yield has been black. Mung beans can use a harvester for harvesting. It is important to set up the header in case of over-threshing.

=== Transportation and storage condition ===
The perfect moisture of grain for transportation is 13%. Before storage, the cleaning and grading process must be done. The ideal storage condition should keep the mung bean's moisture at exactly 12%.

=== Pests, diseases and abiotic stress ===
Most of the mung bean cultivars have a yield potential of 1.8–2.5 tons/ha. However, the actual average productivity of mung bean hovers around 0.5–0.7 t/ha. Several factors constrain its yield, including biotic stresses (pests and diseases) and abiotic stresses. Stresses not only decrease productivity but also affect the physical quality of seeds, making them unusable or unfit for human consumption. All the stresses collectively can lead to significant yield losses of up to 10–100%.

==== Pests ====
Insect pests attack mung bean at all crop stages from sowing to storage stage and take a heavy toll on crop yield. Some insect pests directly damage the crop, while others act as vectors of diseases to transmit the virus.

Stem fly (bean fly) is one of the major pests of mung bean. This pest infests the crop within a week after germination and under epidemic conditions, it can cause total crop loss.

Whitefly, B. tabaci, is a serious pest in mung bean and damages the crop either directly by feeding on phloem sap and excreting honeydew on the plant that forms black sooty mould or indirectly by transmitting mung bean yellow mosaic disease (MYMD). Whitefly causes yield losses between 17% and 71% in mung bean.

Thrips infest mung bean both in the seedling and flowering stages. During the seedling stage, thrips infest the seedling's growing point when it emerges from the ground, and under severe infestation, the seedlings fail to grow. Flowering thrips cause heavy damage and attack during flowering and pod formation, which feed on the pedicles and stigma of flowers. Under severe infestation, flowers drop and no pod formation takes place.

Spotted pod borer, Maruca vitrata, is a major insect pest in mung bean in the tropics and subtropics. The pest causes a yield loss of 2–84% in mung bean amounting to US $30 million. The larvae damage all the stages of the crop including flowers, stems, peduncles, and pods; however, heavy damage occurs at the flowering stage where the larvae form webs combining flowers and leaves.

Cowpea aphid sucks plant sap that causes loss of plant vigor and may lead to yellowing, stunting or distortion of plant parts. Further, aphids secrete honeydew (unused sap) which leads to the development of sooty mould on plant parts. Cowpea aphid also can act as a vector of the mung bean common mosaic virus.

Bruchid is the most severe stored pest of legume seeds worldwide, with damage up to 100% losses within 3–6 months, if not controlled. Bruchid infestation in mungbean results in weight loss, low germination, and nutritional changes in seeds, thereby reducing the nutritional and market value, rendering it unfit for human consumption, and agricultural and commercial uses.

==== Diseases ====
Mungbean yellow mosaic disease (MYMD) is a significant viral disease of mung bean, which causes severe yield losses annually. MYMD is caused by three distinct begomoviruses, transmitted by whitefly. The economic losses due to MYMD account for up to 85% yield reduction in India.

The major fungal diseases are Cercospora leaf spot (CLS), dry root rot, powdery mildew and anthracnose. Dry root rot (Macrophomina phaseolina) is an emerging disease of mungbean, causing 10–44% yield losses in mung bean production in India and Pakistan. The pathogen affects the fibrovascular system of the roots and basal internodes of its host, impeding the transport of water and nutrients to the upper parts of the plant.

Halo blight, bacterial leaf spot, and tan spot are significant bacterial diseases.

==== Abiotic stress ====
Abiotic stresses negatively influence plant growth and productivity and are the primary causes of extensive agricultural losses worldwide. Reduction in crop yield due to environmental variations has increased steadily over the decades.

Salinity affects crop growth and yield by way of osmotic stress, ion toxicity, and reduced nodulation which ultimately lead to reduced nitrogen-fixing ability. Excessive salt leads to leaf injury and then reduced photosynthesis.

High-temperature stress negatively affects reproductive development in mung bean and affects all reproductive traits like flower initiation, pollen viability, fertilization, pod set, seed quality, etc. High temperatures over 42 °C during summer causes hardening of seeds due to incomplete sink development.

Mung bean requires a light moisture regime in the soil during its growing period, while at the time of harvest, complete dry conditions are required. Since it is mostly grown under rainfed conditions, it is more susceptible to water deficiencies as compared to many other food legumes. Drought affects its growth and development by negatively affecting vegetative growth, flower initiation, abnormal pollen behavior and pod set. However, simultaneously, excess moisture or waterlogging, even for a short period of time, especially at the early vegetative stage may be detrimental to the crop.

Mung bean may also be affected by excess soil and atmospheric moisture during the rainy season which may lead to pre-harvest sprouting in mature pods. It deteriorates the quality of the seed/grain produced.

==== Integrated disease management ====
Using climate analysis tools delivered on the web can firstly help farmers interrogate climate records to ask questions relating to rainfall, temperature, radiation, and derived variables to avoid some of the abiotic stresses. Deployment of varieties with genetic resistance is the most effective and durable method for integrated disease management, in the meantime focusing on yield, height, grain quality, market opportunities and seed availability. For pre-harvest sprouting (PHS), the development of mung bean cultivars with a short (10–15 days) period of fresh seed dormancy (FSD) is important to curtail losses incurred by PHS.

=== Market ===
Mung bean plants have a long history of being consumed by humans. The main consumed parts are the seeds and sprouts. The mature seeds provide an invaluable source of digestible protein for humans in places where meat is lacking or where people are mostly vegetarian. Mung bean has a large market in Asia (India, Southeast Asia and East Asia) and is also consumed in Southern Europe and in the Southern US. Mung bean protein is considered safe as a novel food (NF) pursuant to Regulation (EU) 2015/2283. The consumption of mung bean varies depending on the geographic region. For instance, in India, mung bean is used in sweets, snacks and savoury items. In other parts of Asia, it is used in cakes, sprouts, noodles and soups. In Europe and America, it is mainly used as fresh bean sprouts. The consumption of mung beans as such in the US is in the order of 22–29 g/capita per year, while the consumption in some areas of Asia can be as high as 2 kg/capita per year.

Mung bean is considered an alternative crop in many regions, which is generally preferable to sign a contract for the growing process before planting. In the US, the average price of mung bean is around $0.20 per pound. This is double the price of soybeans. The difference in production costs for mung bean and soybean is due to post-harvest cleaning and/or transportation. Overall, mung bean is considered to have market potential for its drought tolerance, and it is a food crop and not a feed crop, which can help buffer the economic risk from variability in commodity crop prices for farmers.

== Uses ==
Mature seeds, raw
Nutritional value per 100 g (3.5 oz)
- Energy: 1,452 kJ (347 kcal)
- Carbohydrates: 62.62 g
- Sugars: 6.6 g
- Dietary fiber: 16.3 g
- Fat: 1.15 g
- Protein: 28.86 g
Vitamins and minerals
Vitamins	Quantity %DV^{†}
Thiamine (B1)	52% 0.621 mg
Riboflavin (B2)	18% 0.233 mg
Niacin (B3)	14% 2.251 mg
Pantothenic acid (B5)	38% 1.91 mg
Vitamin B6	22% 0.382 mg
Folate (B9)	156% 625 μg
Vitamin C	5% 4.8 mg
Vitamin E	3% 0.51 mg
Vitamin K	8% 9 μg
Minerals	Quantity %DV^{†}
Calcium	10% 132 mg
Iron	37% 6.74 mg
Magnesium	45% 189 mg
Manganese	45% 1.035 mg
Phosphorus	29% 367 mg
Potassium	42% 1246 mg
Zinc	24% 2.68 mg
- Link to USDA Database entry
- ^{†}Percentages estimated using US recommendations for adults, except for potassium, which is estimated based on expert recommendation from the National Academies.

Mature seeds, sprouted, raw
Nutritional value per 100 g (3.5 oz)
- Energy: 126 kJ (30 kcal)
- Carbohydrates: 5.94 g
- Sugars: 4.13 g
- Dietary fiber: 1.8 g
- Fat: 0.18 g
- Protein: 3.04 g
Vitamins and minerals
Vitamins	Quantity %DV^{†}
Thiamine (B1)	7% 0.084 mg
Riboflavin (B2)	10% 0.124 mg
Niacin (B3)	5% 0.749 mg
Pantothenic acid (B5)	8% 0.38 mg
Vitamin B6	5% 0.088 mg
Folate (B9)	15% 61 μg
Vitamin C	15% 13.2 mg
Vitamin E	1% 0.1 mg
Vitamin K	28% 33 μg
Minerals	Quantity %DV^{†}
Calcium	1% 13 mg
Iron	5% 0.91 mg
Magnesium	5% 21 mg
Manganese	8% 0.188 mg
Phosphorus	4% 54 mg
Potassium	5% 149 mg
Zinc	4% 0.41 mg
- Link to USDA Database entry
- ^{†}Percentages estimated using US recommendations for adults, except for potassium, which is estimated based on expert recommendation from the National Academies.

Boiled mung beans
Nutritional value per 100 g (3.5 oz)
- Energy: 441 kJ (105 kcal)
- Carbohydrates: 19.15 g
- Sugars: 2 g
- Dietary fiber: 7.6 g
- Fat: 0.38 g
- Protein: 7.02 g
Vitamins and minerals
Vitamins	Quantity %DV^{†}
Thiamine (B1)	14% 0.164 mg
Riboflavin (B2)	5% 0.061 mg
Niacin (B3)	4% 0.577 mg
Pantothenic acid (B5)	8% 0.41 mg
Vitamin B6	4% 0.067 mg
Folate (B9)	40% 159 μg
Vitamin C	1% 1 mg
Vitamin E	1% 0.15 mg
Vitamin K	2% 2.7 μg
Minerals	Quantity %DV^{†}
Calcium	2% 27 mg
Iron	8% 1.4 mg
Magnesium	11% 48 mg
Manganese	13% 0.298 mg
Phosphorus	8% 99 mg
Potassium	9% 266 mg
Zinc	8% 0.84 mg
- Link to USDA Database entry
- ^{†}Percentages estimated using US recommendations for adults, except for potassium, which is estimated based on expert recommendation from the National Academies.

=== Nutritional value ===
The mung bean is recognized for its high nutritive value. A mung bean contains about 55–65% carbohydrate (equal to 630 g/kg dry weight) and are rich in protein, vitamins, and minerals. It is composed of about 20–50% protein of total dry weight, among which globulin (60%) and albumin (25%) are the primary storage proteins (see table). The mung bean is considered to be a substantive source of dietary proteins. The proteolytic cleavage of these proteins is even higher during sprouting. Mung bean carbohydrates are easily digestible, which causes less flatulence in humans compared to other forms of legumes. Both seeds and sprouts of the mung bean produce lower calories compared to other cereals, which makes it a more attractive bean to obese and diabetic individuals.

=== Culinary ===
Whole cooked mung beans are generally prepared from dried beans by boiling until they are soft. Mung beans are light yellow in colour when their skins are removed. Mung bean paste can be made by hulling, cooking, and pulverizing the beans to a dry paste.

==== South Asia ====
Although whole mung beans are also occasionally used in Indian cuisine, beans without skins are more commonly used. In Karnataka, Maharashtra, Odisha, Gujarat, Kerala, and Tamil Nadu, whole mung beans are commonly boiled to make a dry preparation often served with congee. Hulled mung beans can also be used in a similar fashion as whole beans for the purpose of making sweet soups.

In Madhya Pradesh and Rajasthan, mung beans are partially mashed, fermented, and made into fritters called mangode, which serves as a common tea time snack similar to Pakora.

In Goa, sprouted mung beans are cooked in a coconut milk based, mild curry called moonga gaathi.

Mung beans in some regional cuisines of India are stripped of their outer coats to make mung dal. In Odisha, West Bengal and Bangladesh the stripped and split bean is used to make a soup-like dal known as mug ḍal (মুগ ডাল).

In Southern India, state of Karnataka, Tamil Nadu, Telangana, and Andhra Pradesh, as well as in Maharashtra, steamed whole beans are seasoned with spices and fresh grated coconut. In South India, especially Andhra Pradesh, batter made from ground whole moong beans (including skin) is used to make a popular variety of dosa called pesarattu (పెసరట్టు) or pesara-dosa.

In India and Pakistan, cooked mung dal is often paired with boiled white basmati rice in a combination dish called "dal chawal".

In Sri Lanka, boiled Mung beans are usually eaten with grated coconut and lunu-miris, a spicy chili and onion sambol, most commonly as a breakfast food. Mung beans are also added to kiribath, which is then termed mung-kiribath. During the traditional New Year Celebration (celebrated in April) mung beans are used to make a traditional fried sweet, mung-kavum.

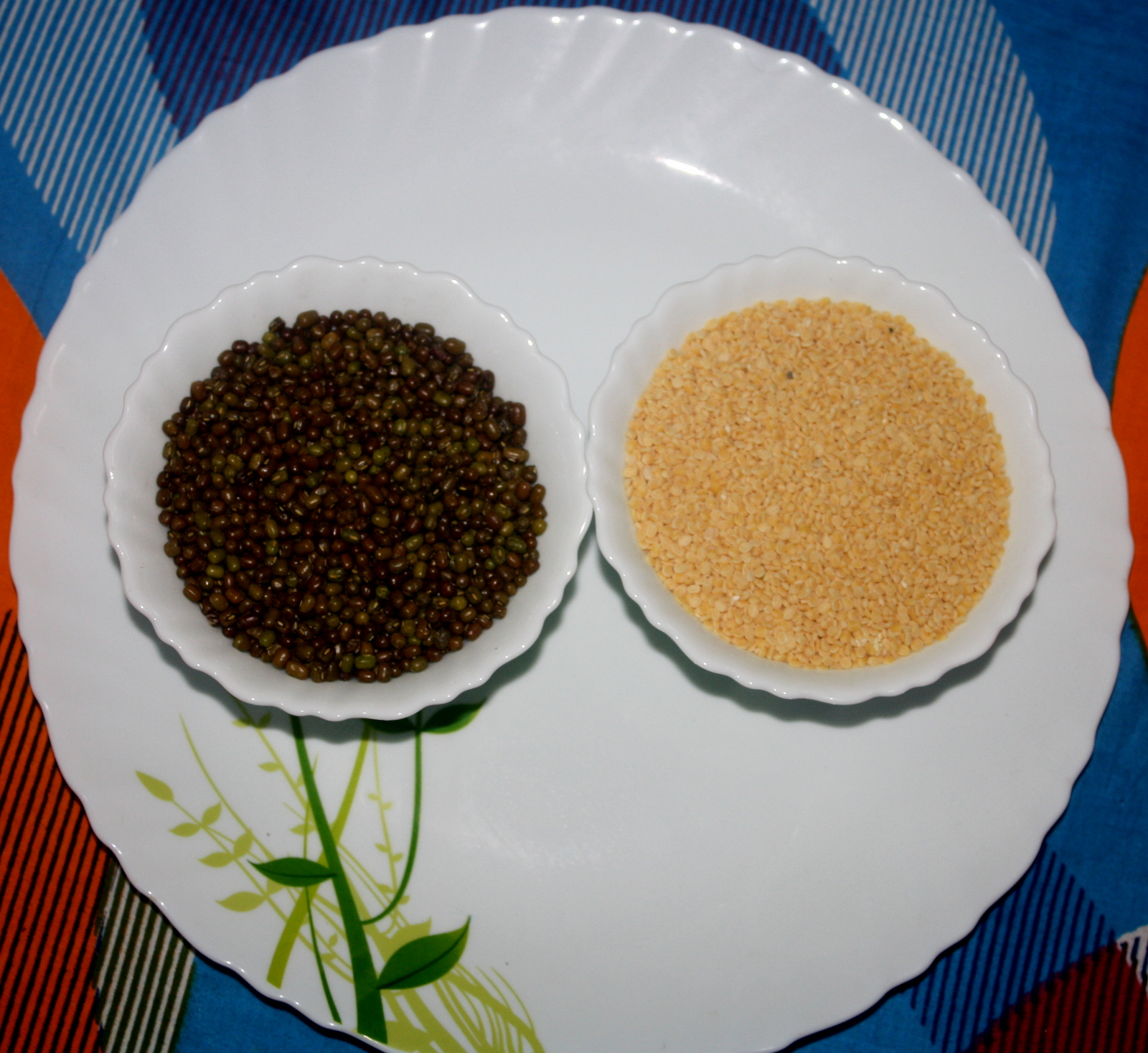
Green gram dal

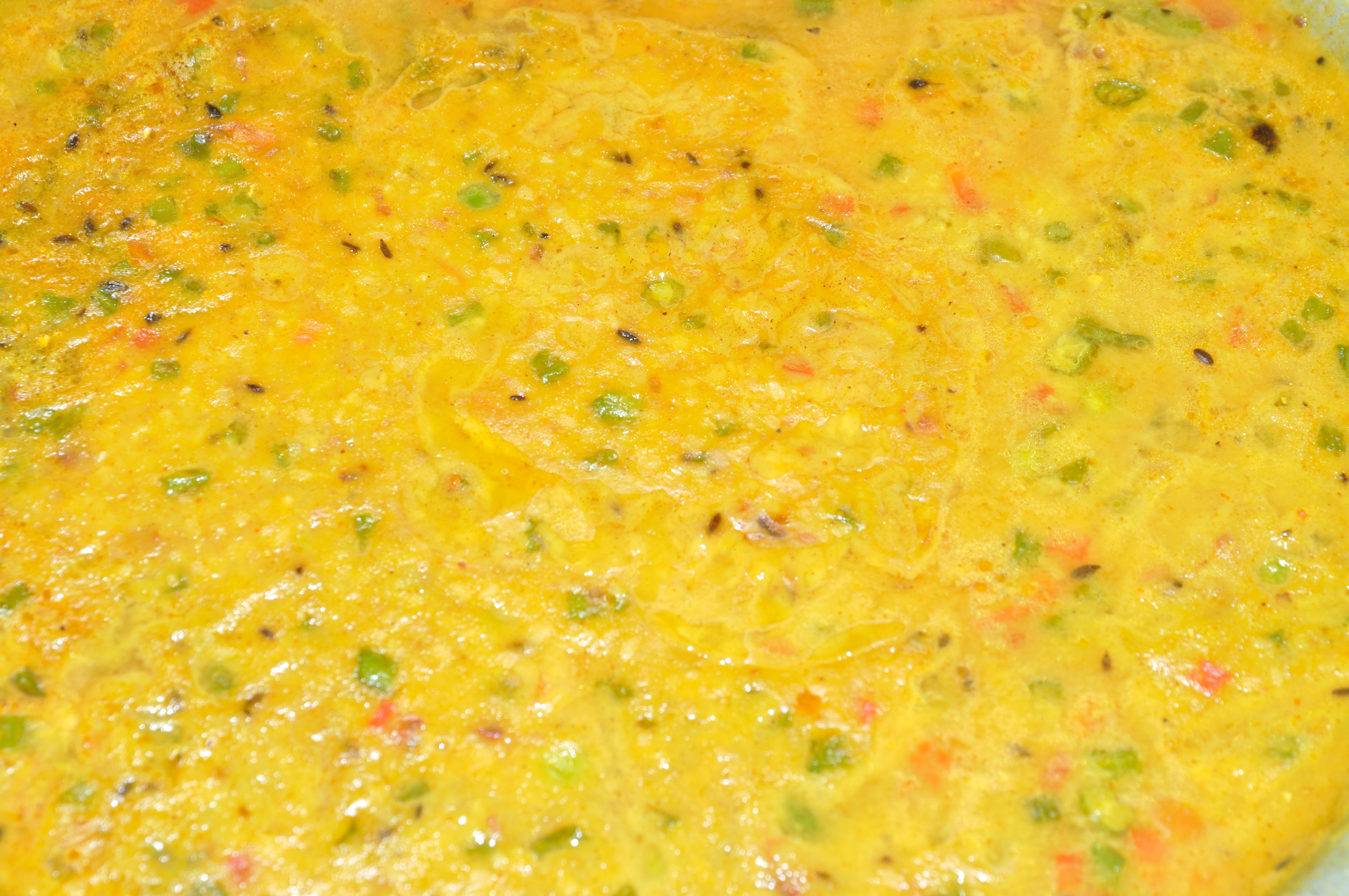
Indian mung dal

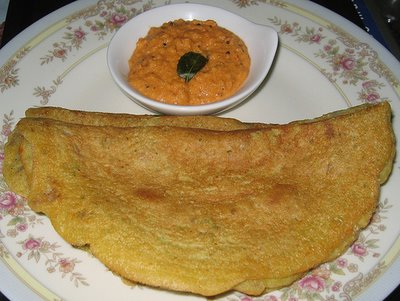
Telugu Pesarattu, savoury mung-bean crêpe

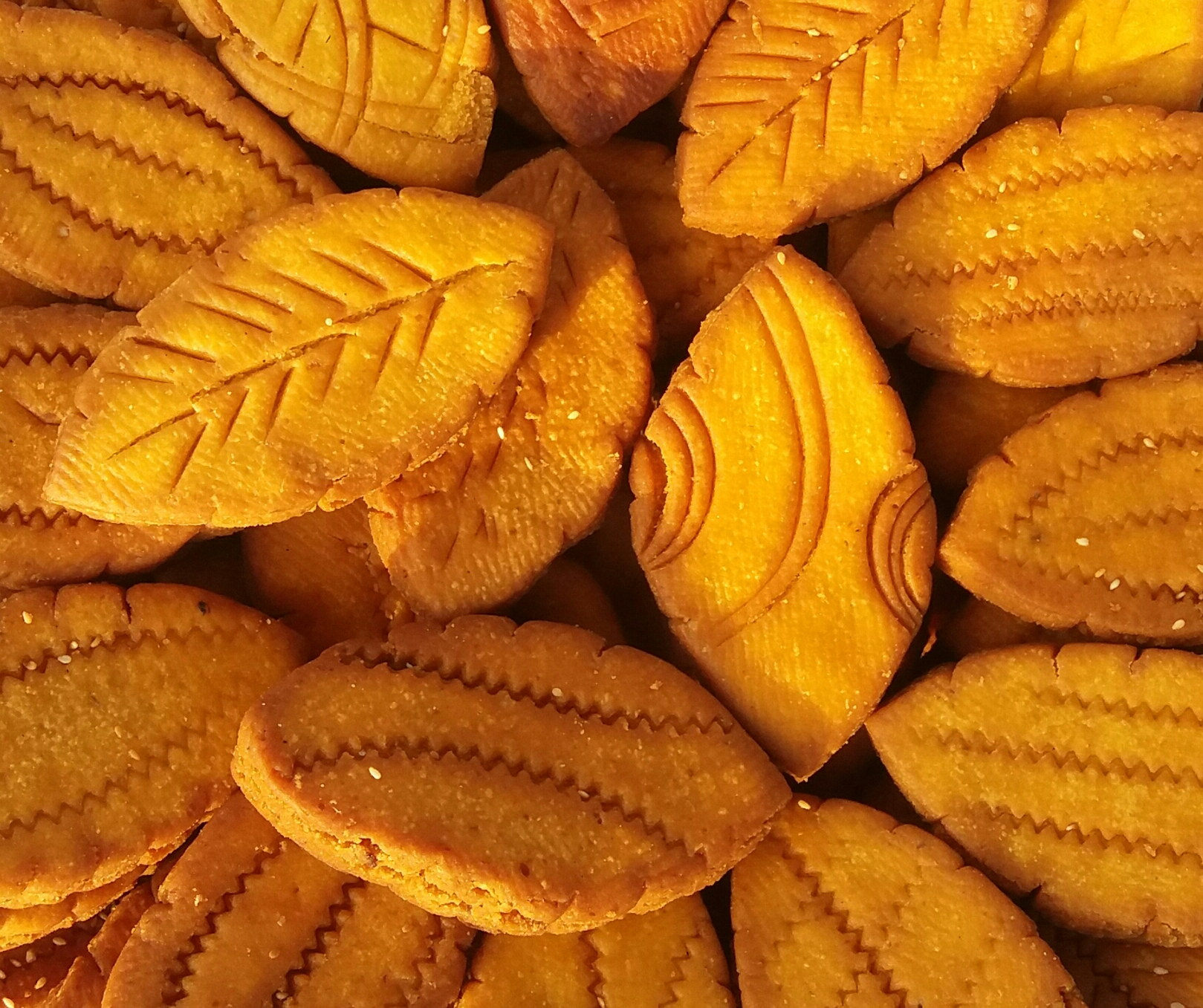
Mung pakon, traditional Bengali pitha, Bangladesh

==== East Asia ====
In southern Chinese cuisine, whole mung beans are used to make a tángshuǐ, or dessert, called lǜdòu tángshuǐ, which is served either warm or chilled. They are also often cooked with rice to make congee. Unlike in South Asia, whole mung beans seldom appear in savory dishes.

In Hong Kong, hulled mung beans and mung bean paste are made into ice cream or frozen ice pops. Mung bean paste is used as a common filling for Chinese mooncakes in East China and Taiwan. During the Dragon Boat Festival, the boiled and shelled beans are used as filling in zongzi prepared for consumption. The beans may also be cooked until soft, blended into a liquid, sweetened, and served as a beverage, popular in many parts of China. In South China and Vietnam, mung bean paste may be mixed with sugar, fat, and fruits or spices to make pastries, such as bánh đậu xanh.

In Korea, skinned mung beans are soaked and ground with some water to make a thick batter. This is used as a basis for the Korean pancakes called bindae-tteok. They are also commonly used for Hobak-tteok.

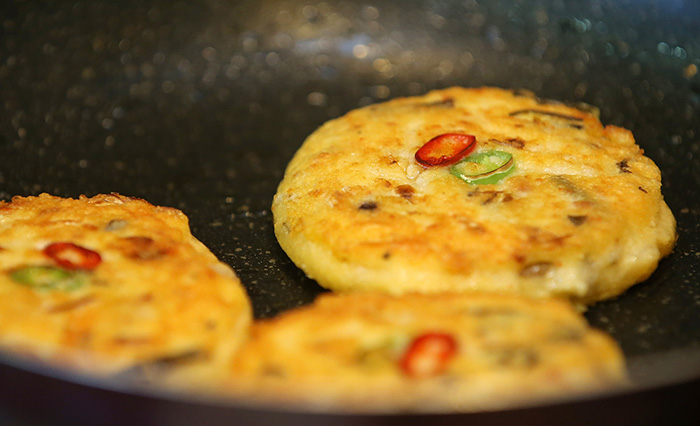
Korean mung bean pancakes being cooked

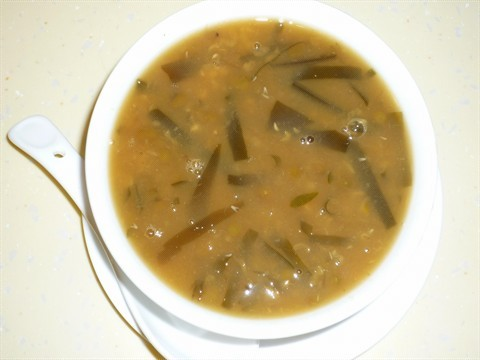
Chinese mung bean soup from Hong Kong

==== Southeast Asia ====
In the Philippines, ginisáng monggó/mónggo (sautéed mung bean stew), also known as monggó/mónggo guisado or balatong, is a savoury stew of whole mung beans with prawns or fish. It is traditionally served on Fridays of Lent, when the majority of Catholic Filipinos traditionally abstain from meat. Variants of ginisáng monggó/mónggo may also be made with chicken or pork. Mung beans are also used in the Filipino dessert ginataang munggo (also known as balatong), a rice gruel with coconut milk and sugar flavored with pandan leaves or vanilla.

Mung bean paste is also a common filling of pastries known as ondé-ondé and bakpia in Indonesia and hopia in the Philippines, and further afield in Guyana (where it is known as "black eye cake"). It is also used as a filling for pan de monggo, a Filipino bread. In Indonesia, mung beans are also made into a popular dessert snack called es kacang hijau, which has the consistency of a porridge. The beans are cooked with sugar, coconut milk, and a little ginger.

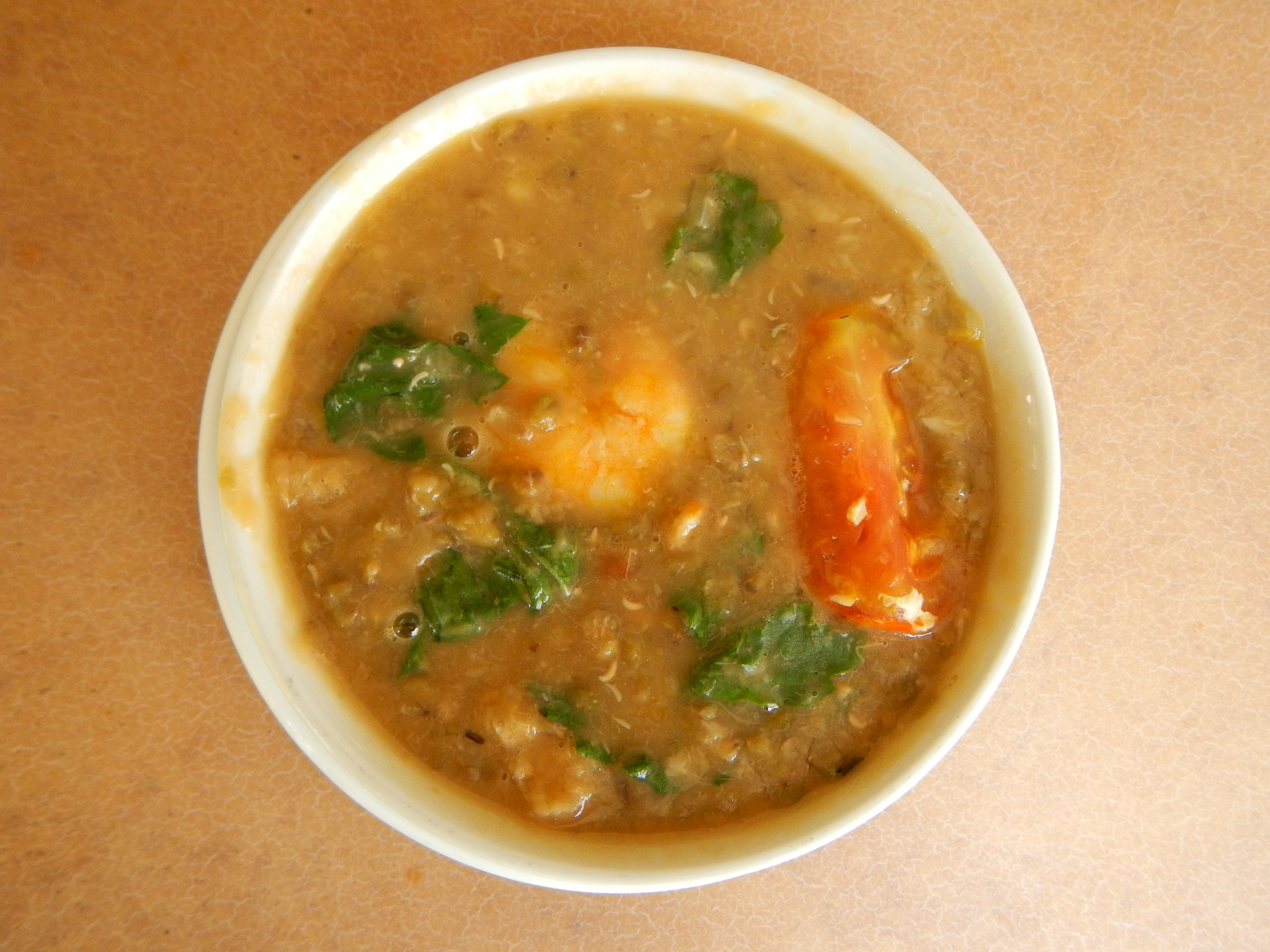
Filipino ginisang monggo with ampalaya and shrimp

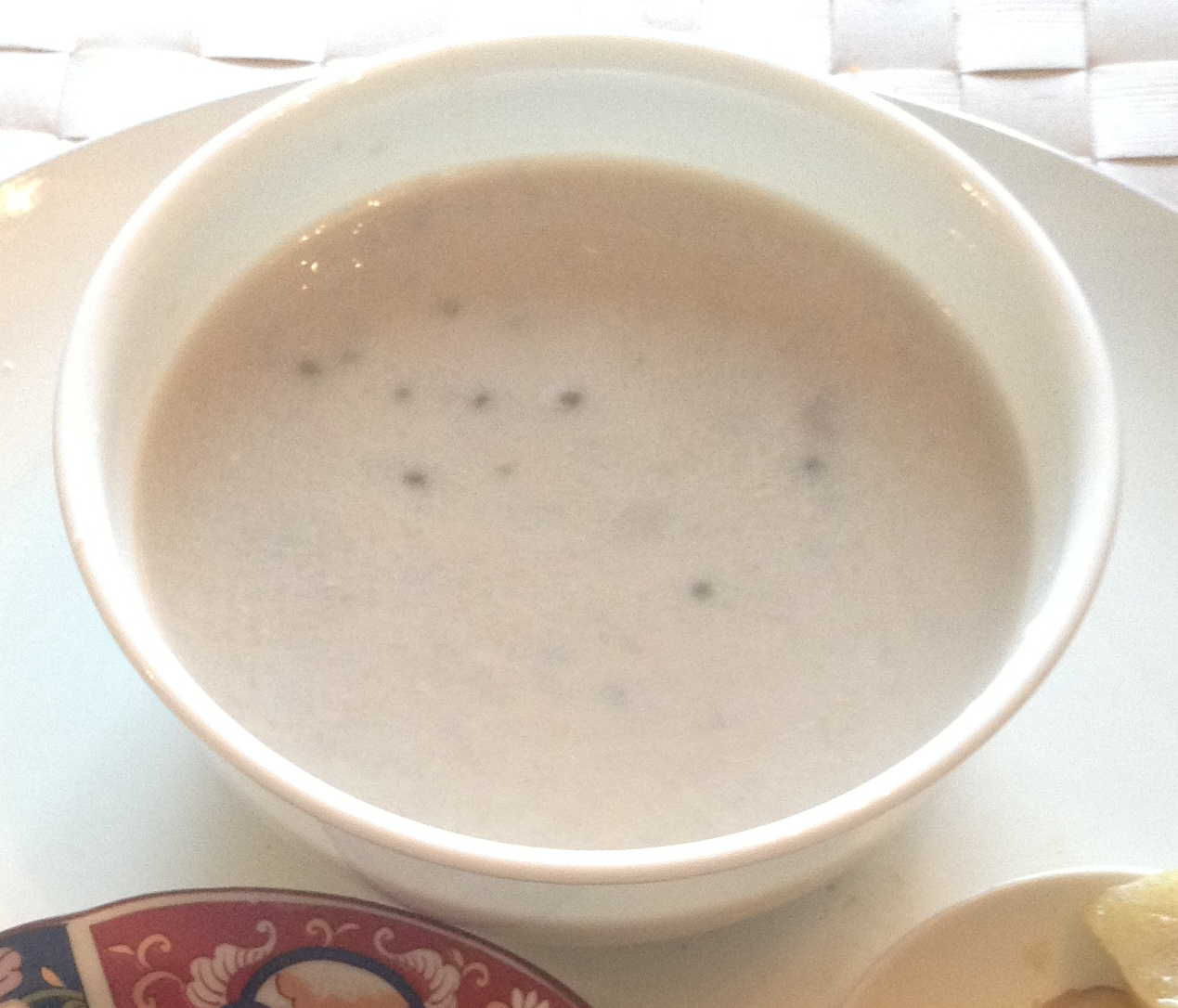
Filipino ginataang munggo, a sweet rice gruel with mung beans and coconut milk, sugar, and pandan leaf extract

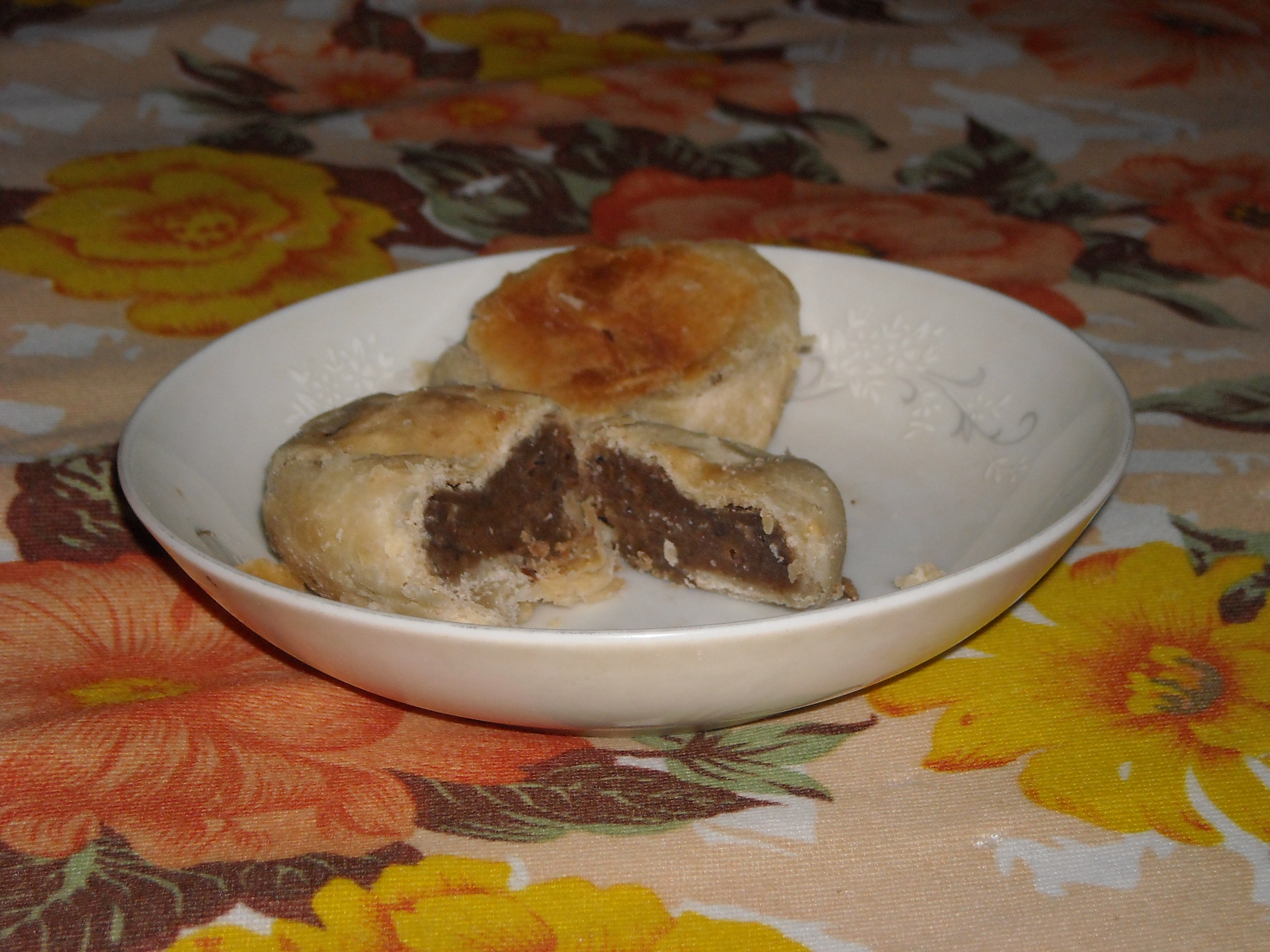
Filipino hopia filled with mung bean paste

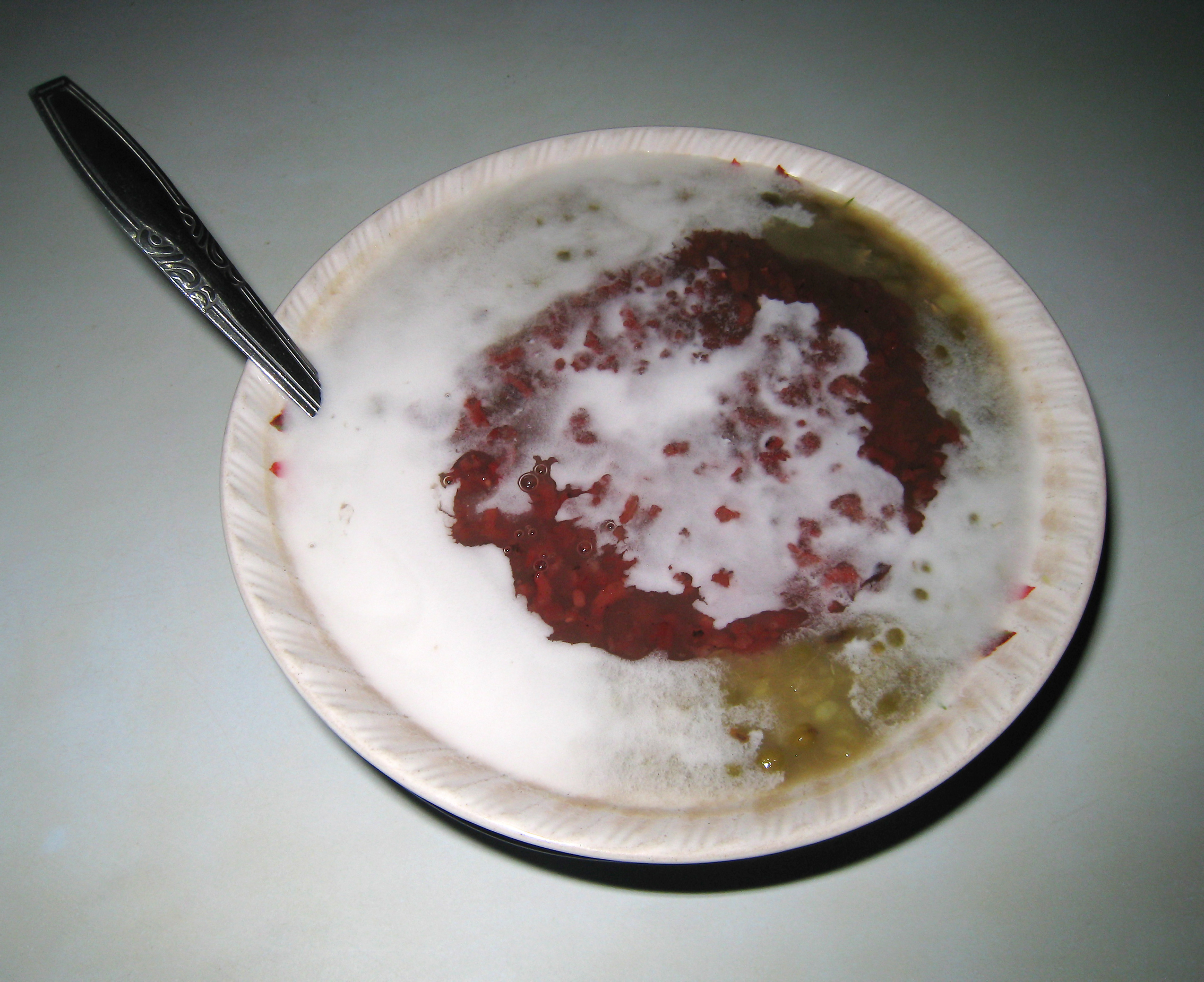
Indonesian bubur kacang hijau dan ketan hitam, made with mung beans in coconut milk and sugar, served with or mixed with black glutinous rice

==== Middle East ====
A staple diet in some parts of the Middle East is mung beans and rice. Both are cooked together in a pilaf-like rice dish called māš wa-ruzz, which means mung beans and rice.

=== Bean sprouts ===
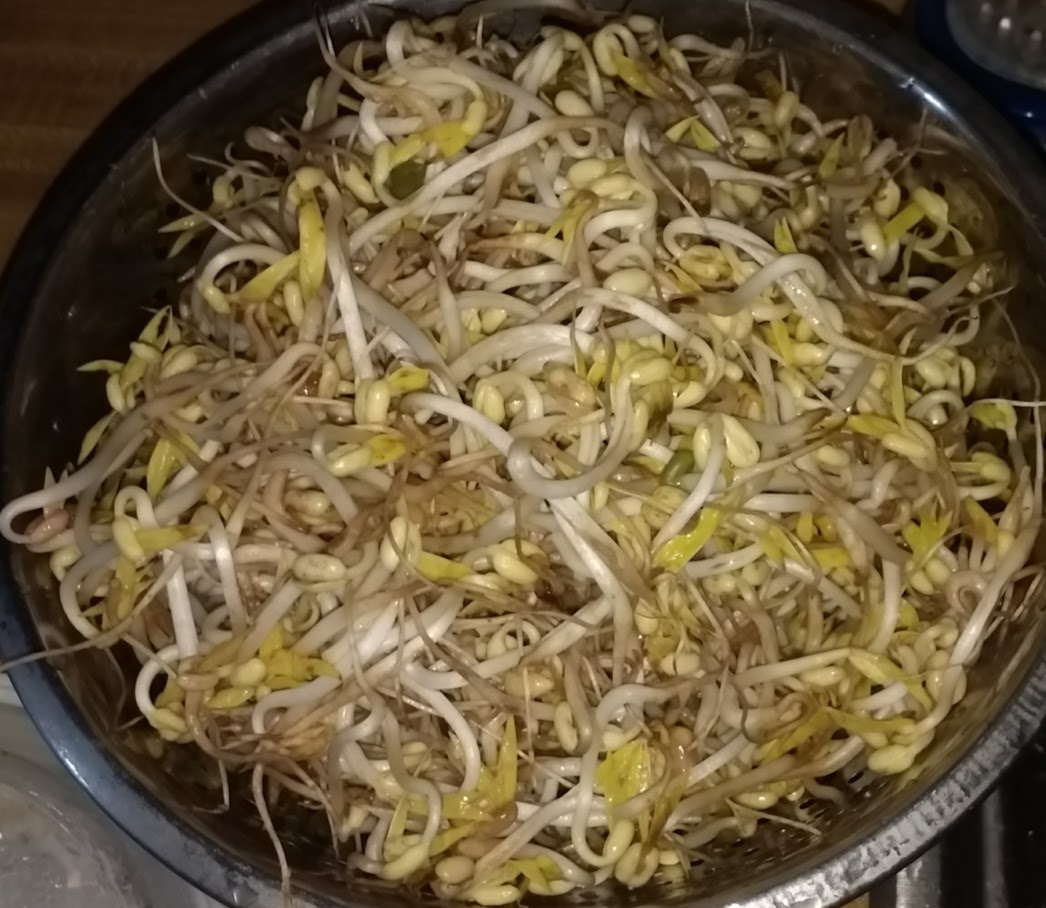
These sprouts have been transferred from a similarly-shaped colander in which they had been grown with moisture. They are ready to be cooked.

Mung beans are germinated by leaving them in water for four hours of daytime light and spending the rest of the day in the dark. Mung bean sprouts can be grown under artificial light for four hours over the period of a week. They are usually simply called "bean sprouts". However, when bean sprouts are called for in recipes, it generally refers to mung bean or soybean sprouts.

Mung bean sprouts are stir-fried as a Chinese vegetable accompaniment to a meal, usually with garlic, ginger, spring onions, or pieces of salted dried fish to add flavour. Uncooked bean sprouts are used in filling for Vietnamese spring rolls, as well as a garnish for phở. They are a major ingredient in a variety of Malaysian and Peranakan cuisine, including char kway teow, hokkien mee, mee rebus, and pasembor.

In Korea, slightly cooked mung bean sprouts, called sukjunamul (Korean: 숙주나물), are often served as a side dish. They are blanched (placed into boiling water for less than a minute), immediately cooled in cold water, and mixed with sesame oil, garlic, salt, and often other ingredients.

In the Philippines, mung bean sprouts are called togue and are most commonly used in lumpia rolls called lumpiang togue.

In India, mung bean sprouts are cooked with green chili, garlic, and other spices.

In Indonesia the food are often used as fillings like tahu isi (stuffed tofu) and complementary ingredient in many dishes such as rawon and soto.

In Japan, the sprouts are called moyashi.

=== Starch ===
Sichuan-style spicy liangfen

Mung bean starch, which is extracted from ground mung beans, is used to make transparent cellophane noodles (also known as bean thread noodles, bean threads, glass noodles, fensi (粉絲), tung hoon (冬粉), miến, bún tàu, or bún tào). Cellophane noodles become soft and slippery when they are soaked in hot water. A variation of cellophane noodles, called mung bean sheets or green bean sheets, are also available.

In Korea, a jelly called nokdumuk (Korean: 녹두묵; also called cheongpomuk, 청포묵) is made from mung bean starch; a similar jelly, colored yellow with the addition of gardenia coloring, is called hwangpomuk (황포묵).

In northern China, mung bean jelly is called liangfen (涼粉; 'chilled bean jelly'), which is a very popular food during summer. The Hokkiens add sugar to mung bean jelly to make it a dessert called Lio̍k-tāu hún-kóe (綠豆粉粿; 'mung bean flour cake').

=== Plant-based protein ===
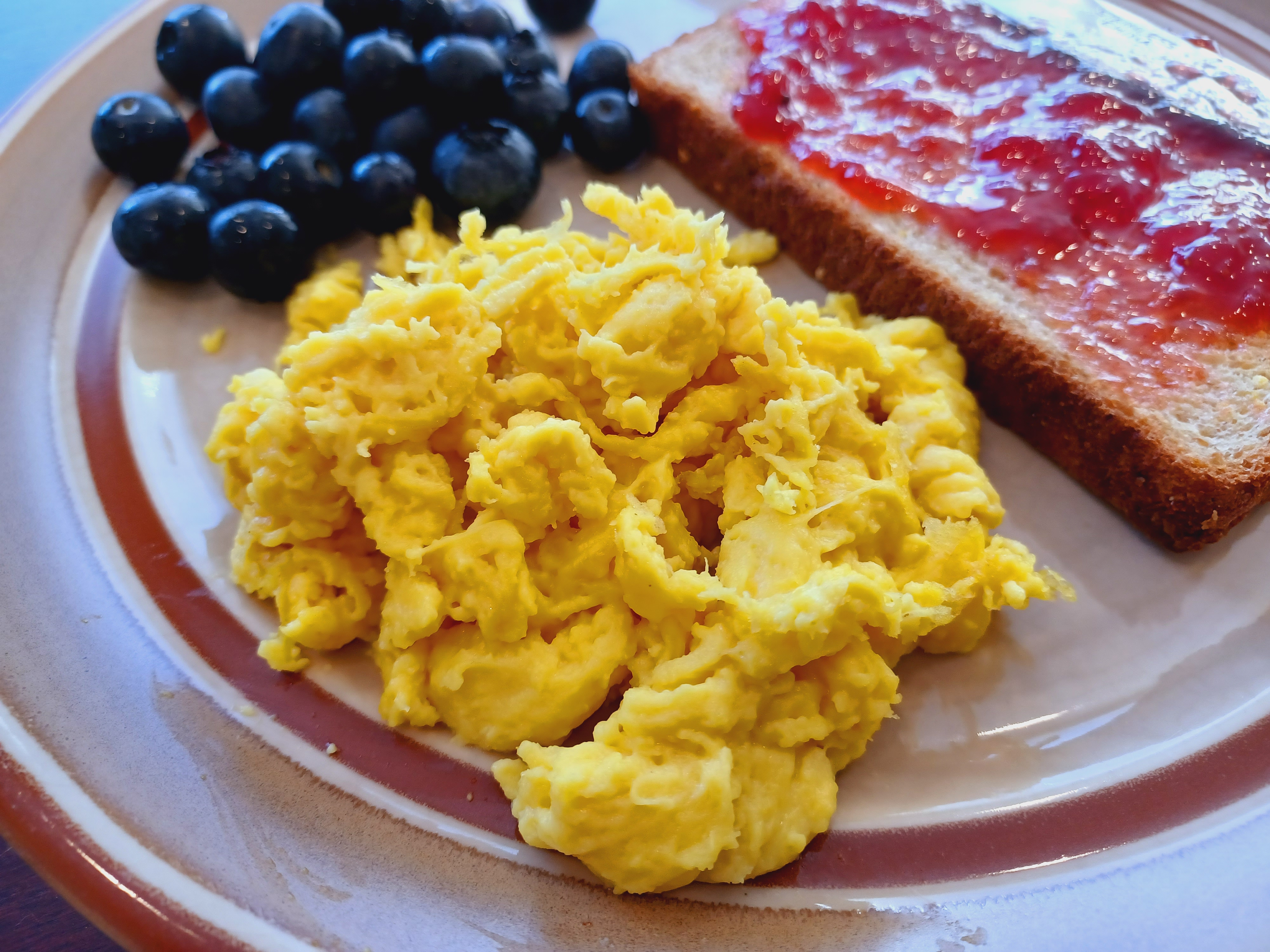
Plant-based egg alternative made with mung bean protein

Mung beans are increasingly used in plant-based meat and egg alternatives such as Beyond Meat and Eat Just's Just Egg.

== See also ==
- Moong dal halwa
- Black bean paste
- Douzhi
- Green bean
- Mung bean nuclease
- Mungbean yellow mosaic virus
