= Mungbean yellow mosaic virus =

Virus classification
- (unranked): Virus
- Realm: Monodnaviria
- Kingdom: Shotokuvirae
- Phylum: Cressdnaviricota
- Class: Repensiviricetes
- Order: Geplafuvirales
- Family: Geminiviridae
- Genus: Begomovirus
- Species: Begomovirus vignaradiatae

Species of virus

Mungbean yellow mosaic virus (MYMV) is a plant pathogenic virus of the family Geminiviridae. Of the various viral diseases inflicting legume crops, Mungbean Yellow Mosaic disease is one of the most destructive and widely distributed. The disease has been reported from various countries.

== Region-specific outbreaks ==
Yellow mosaic disease of many legumes in India and other South Asian countries is transmitted by geminiviruses belonging to the family Geminiviridae and genus Begomovirus. Four species, Mungbean yellow mosaic virus (MYMV), Mungbean yellow mosaic India virus (MYMIV), Dolichos yellow mosaic virus (DYMV) and Horsegram yellow mosaic virus (HYMV), are known to cause yellow mosaic disease in different leguminous species. Mungbean yellow mosaic India virus (MYMIV) is a bipartite Begomovirus from the family Geminiviridae and is reported to be the causative agent of the disease in India.

== Symptoms ==
Mungbean yellow mosaic disease is characterized by a bright yellow mosaic on the leaves of infected plants and causes significant losses to mungbean (Vigna radiata) crops in India.

== Host species ==
Geminiviruses infect a wide variety of crop plants, devastating some of the economically important plants ranging from dicots to monocots. These lead to major agro-economical losses worldwide, and are subjects of immense concern. The most affected leguminous crops by MYMIV are pigeon peas (Cajanus cajan), soybeans (Glycine max), mat beans (Phaseolus aconitifolius), common beans (P. aureus), French beans (P. vulgaris), and black lentils (Vigna mungo).

== Disease transmission ==
Yellow mosaic disease of many legumes is often transmitted by silverfly (Bemisia tabaci).

== Viral structure ==
These are plant viruses which have single-stranded circular DNA genomes encoding genes that diverge in both directions from a virion strand origin of replication (i.e. geminivirus genomes are ambisense). According to the Baltimore classification, they are considered to be class II viruses. The genome can either be a single component between 2500 and 3100 nucleotides, or, in the case of some begomoviruses, two similar-sized components each between 2600 and 2800 nucleotides. They have elongated, geminate capsids with two incomplete T=1 icosahedra joined at the missing vertex. The capsids range in size from 18–20 nm in diameter with a length of about 30 nm. Geminiviruses constitute a large family of phytopathogens (Geminiviridae). The family geminiviridae have been classified into four genera, namely Begomovirus, Curtovirus, Topocuvirus and Mastrevirus, depending on their genomes, mode of transmission and host range. Geminiviridae are transmitted by white flies, scientifically known as Bamesia tabacci. The genus begomoviridae generally comprises bipartite (two components, namely DNA- ‘A’ and ‘B’) genome, which replicates via rolling circle (RCR) model with the help of few viral and several host factors. Mungbean yellow mosaic India virus (MYMIV) is a representative of the genus begomovirus / Begomoviridae, which is prevalent in northern part of Indian subcontinent causing yellow mosaic disease (YMD). MYMIV possesses bipartite ssDNA genomes named as DNA-A and DNA-B, both being ~2.7 kb in size. Both components share a common region (CR) of about 200 bp containing the important cis-elements for viral DNA transcription and rolling circle replication (RCR).
