= Micrococcal nuclease =

Class of enzymes

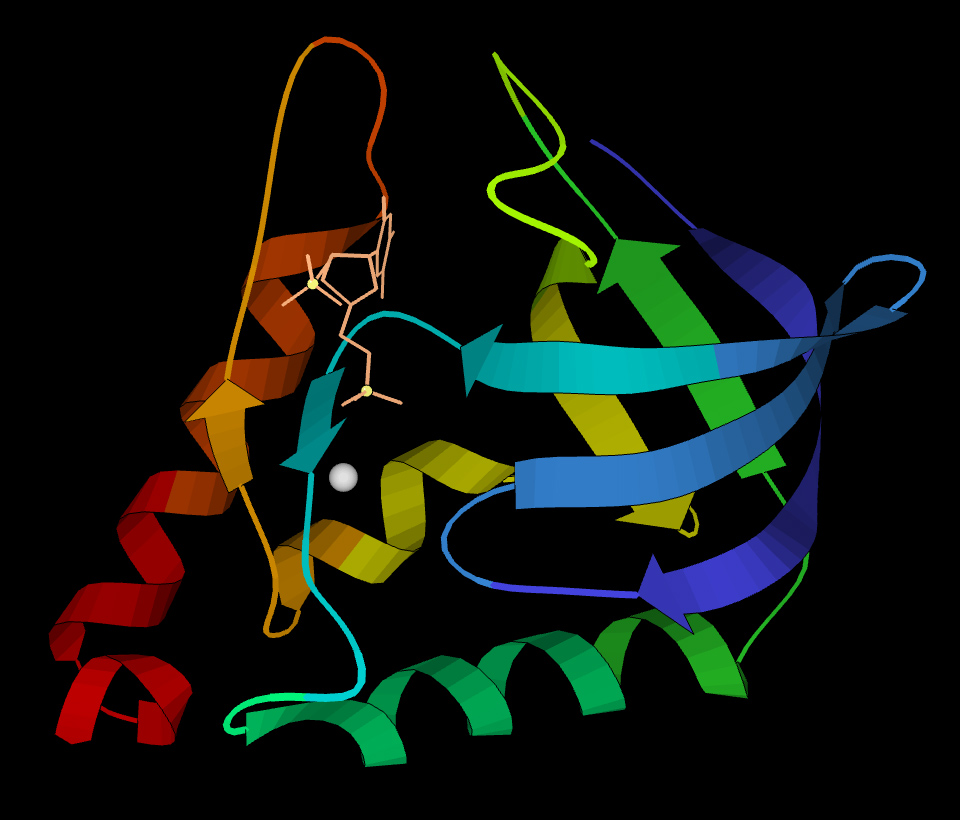
- Ribbon schematic of micrococcal nuclease 3D structure, with Ca^{2+} and TdtP inhibitor

Identifiers
- EC no.: 3.1.31.1
- CAS no.: 9013-53-0

Databases
- BRENDA: enzyme data
- ExPASy: NiceZyme view
- KEGG: enzyme entry
- MetaCyc: metabolic pathway
- Rhea: reactions
- PDB structures: RCSB PDB PDBe PDBsum
Search
- PMC: articles
- PubMed: articles
- NCBI: proteins

Thermonuclease

Identifiers
- Organism: Staphylococcus aureus
- Symbol: nuc
- Orthologs: OMA: entry
- UniProt: P00644
Search for
- Structures: Swiss-model
- Domains: InterPro

Staphylococcal nuclease

Identifiers
- Symbol: ?
- Pfam: PF00565
- InterPro: IPR016071
- PROSITE: PDOC00865
- CATH: 1tt2
- SCOP2: 1tt2 / SCOPe / SUPFAM
Available protein structures:
- PDB: IPR016071 PF00565 (ECOD; PDBsum)
- AlphaFold: IPR016071; PF00565

Micrococcal nuclease (EC 3.1.31.1, S7 Nuclease, MNase, spleen endonuclease, thermonuclease, nuclease T, micrococcal endonuclease, nuclease T', staphylococcal nuclease, spleen phosphodiesterase, Staphylococcus aureus nuclease, Staphylococcus aureus nuclease B, ribonucleate (deoxynucleate) 3'-nucleotidohydrolase) is an endo-exonuclease that preferentially digests single-stranded nucleic acids. The rate of cleavage is 30 times greater at the 5' side of A or T than at G or C and results in the production of mononucleotides and oligonucleotides with terminal 3'-phosphates. The enzyme is also active against double-stranded DNA and RNA and all sequences will be ultimately cleaved.

== Characteristics ==
The enzyme has a molecular weight of 16.9kDa. The pH optimum is reported as 9.2. The enzyme activity is strictly dependent on Ca^{2+} and the pH optimum varies according to Ca^{2+} concentration. The enzyme is therefore easily inactivated by EGTA.

== Sources ==
This enzyme is the extracellular nuclease of Staphylococcus aureus. Two strains, V8 and Foggi, yield almost identical enzymes. A common source is E.coli cells carrying a cloned nuc gene encoding Staphylococcus aureus extracellular nuclease (micrococcal nuclease).

== Structure ==
The 3-dimensional structure of micrococcal nuclease (then called Staphyloccal nuclease) was solved very early in the history of protein crystallography, in 1969. Higher-resolution, more recent crystal structures are available for the apo form and for the thymidine-diphosphate-inhibited form. As seen in the ribbon diagram above, the nuclease molecule has 3 long alpha helices and a 5-stranded, barrel-shaped beta sheet, in an arrangement known as the OB-fold (for oligonucleotide-binding fold) as classified in the SCOP database.

== Applications ==
- CUT&RUN sequencing, antibody-targeted controlled cleavage by micrococcal nuclease for chromatin profiling.
- Hydrolysis of nucleic acids in crude cell-free extracts.
- Sequencing of RNA.
- Preparation of rabbit reticulocyte lysates.
- Studies of chromatin structure.
- Removal of nucleic acids from laboratory protein preparations allowing for protein folding and structure-function studies.
- Research on the mechanisms of protein folding.

== See also ==
- Serratia marcescens nuclease
