= Mung bean nuclease =

Enzyme used to distinguish between single and double stranded DNA and RNA

Mung bean nuclease (Nuclease MB) is a nuclease derived from sprouts of the mung bean (Vigna radiata) that removes nucleotides in a step-wise manner from single-stranded DNA molecules (ssDNA) and is used in biotechnological applications to remove such ssDNA from a mixture also containing double-stranded DNA (dsDNA). This enzyme is useful for transcript mapping, removal of single-stranded regions in DNA hybrids or single-stranded overhangs produced by restriction enzymes, etc. It has an activity similar to Nuclease S1 (both are EC 3.1.30.1), but it has higher specificity for single-stranded molecules.

The enzyme degrades single-stranded DNA or RNA to nucleoside 5’-monophosphates, but does not digest double-stranded DNA, double-stranded RNA, or DNA / RNA hybrids. Mung Bean Nuclease catalyzes the specific degradation of single-stranded DNA or RNA, and produces mono and oligonucleotides carrying a 5′-P terminus. Mung bean nuclease has a stringent single-stranded specificity for DNA or RNA.

Mung bean nuclease has an estimated molecular weight of 39 kDa by SDS-PAGE. A glycoprotein, 29% of this mass is sugars. As of April 2019, the specific gene encoding for this protein is unknown, and all production relies on a purification process on bean sprouts from 1980. Some is known about its structure, with one exposed Cysteine residue and 3 pairs of disulfide bonds. Some is known about its amino acid composition.

== Requirements ==
Mung bean nuclease requires Zn^{2+}. The addition of EDTA or SDS causes irreversible inactivation. Mung bean nuclease is not active at pH below 4.6, nor at low salt concentration.

== Description ==
Nuclease MB is a specific DNA and RNA exo-endonuclease which will degrade single-stranded extensions from the ends of DNA and RNA molecules, leaving blunt, ligatable ends. Its higher single-strand specificity makes it the enzyme of choice for most applications requiring a single-strand-specific nuclease.

Unlike S1 Nuclease, Mung Bean Nuclease will not cleave the intact strand of nicked duplex DNA.

Its ability to recognise double-stranded nucleic acids depends on the base sequence.

It tends to cleave at ApN and at T(U) pN. It completely degrades ApA, but does not degrade G and C. Unlike S1 Nuclease, it does not cleave the strand opposite to that which has been nicked.

Mung Bean Nuclease catalyzes the specific degradation of single-stranded DNA or RNA, and produces mono- and oligonucleotides carrying a 5′-P terminus.

More than 1000- fold amount of enzyme can degrade oligomer into all mononucleotides.

An excess of the enzyme is required to degrade double-stranded DNA or RNA and DNA-RNA hybrids, and in this case, AT-rich regions are selectively degraded.

This enzyme work well at A↓pN, T ↓pN sites, and especially A↓pN sites are 100% degraded.

However, it is difficult to degrade C↓pC, C↓pG site.

Mung bean exonuclease is a nuclease derived from mung beans that removes nucleotides in a step-wise manner from single stranded DNA molecules and is used to remove such ssDNA from a mixture also containing double stranded DNA (dsDNA).

Unit Definition:

One unit of Mung Bean Nuclease converts 1 µg of heat-denatured calf thymus DNA into an acid-soluble form in 1 minute at 37 °C under standard assay conditions.

== Applications in biotechnology and biochemical research ==
- Removal of hairpin loops during cDNA synthesis.
- High-resolution mapping of the termini and exon structures of RNA transcripts (commonly termed Berk-Sharp or S1 Mapping) using either internal-labelled or end-labelled probes.
- Restriction-site modification or removal by digestion of single-stranded protruding ends.
- Cleavage of single-basepair mismatches, as a replacement for CEL 1 Nuclease in TILLING.
- Unidirectional deletion of large DNA (in combination with Exonuclease III) to generate ordered deletions for sequencing.
- Removal of 3´ and 5´ extensions from DNA or RNA termini.
- Transcriptional mapping.
- Cleavage of hairpin loops.
- Excision of gene coding sequences from genomic DNA.
