= DNA/RNA non-specific endonuclease =

Endonuclease_NS
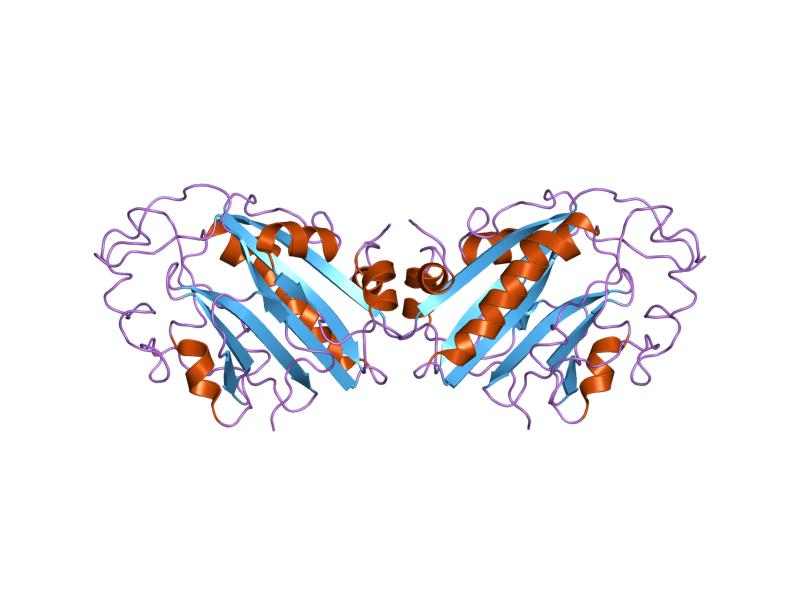
- identification of the serratia endonuclease dimer: structural basis and implications for catalysis

Identifiers
- Symbol: Endonuclease_NS
- Pfam: PF01223
- Pfam clan: CL0263
- InterPro: IPR001604
- PROSITE: PDOC00821
- SCOP2: 1smn / SCOPe / SUPFAM
- CDD: cd00091
Available protein structures:
- PDB: IPR001604 PF01223 (ECOD; PDBsum)
- AlphaFold: IPR001604; PF01223

In molecular biology, enzymes in the DNA/RNA non-specific endonuclease family of bacterial and eukaryotic endonucleases EC 3.1.30.- share the following characteristics: they act on both DNA and RNA, cleave double-stranded and single-stranded nucleic acids and require a divalent ion such as magnesium for their activity. A histidine has been shown to be essential for the activity of the Serratia marcescens nuclease. This residue is located in a conserved region which also contains an aspartic acid residue that could be implicated in the binding of the divalent ion.

Notable members of the family include Serratia marcescens NucA and human Exonuclease G.
