= Nuclease protection assay =

Laboratory technique used in biochemistry and genetics

Nuclease protection assay is a laboratory technique used in biochemistry and genetics to identify individual RNA molecules in a heterogeneous RNA sample extracted from cells. The technique can identify one or more RNA molecules of known sequence even at low total concentration. The extracted RNA is first mixed with antisense RNA or DNA probes that are complementary to the sequence or sequences of interest and the complementary strands are hybridized to form double-stranded RNA (or a DNA-RNA hybrid). The mixture is then exposed to ribonucleases that specifically cleave only single-stranded RNA but have no activity against double-stranded RNA. When the reaction runs to completion, susceptible RNA regions are degraded to very short oligomers or to individual nucleotides; the surviving RNA fragments are those that were complementary to the added antisense strand and thus contained the sequence of interest.

== Probe ==
The probes are prepared by cloning part of the gene of interest in a vector under the control of any of the following promoters, SP6, T7 or T3. These promoters are recognized by DNA dependent RNA polymerases originally characterized from bacteriophages. The probes produced are radioactive as they are prepared by in vitro transcription using radioactive UTPs. Uncomplemented DNA or RNA is cleaved off by nucleases. When the probe is a DNA molecule, S1 nuclease is used; when the probe is RNA, any single-strand-specific ribonuclease can be used. Thus the surviving probe-mRNA complement is simply detected by autoradiography.

== Uses ==
Nuclease protection assays are used to map introns and 5' and 3' ends of transcribed gene regions. Quantitative results can be obtained regarding the amount of the target RNA present in the original cellular extract - if the target is a messenger RNA, this can indicate the level of transcription of the gene in the cell.

They are also used to detect the presence of double stranded RNA, presence of which could mean RNA interference.

Northern blotting is a laboratory technique that produces similar information. It is slower and less quantitative, but also produces accurate information about the size of the target RNA. Nuclease protection assay products are limited to the size of the initial probes due to the destruction of the non-hybridized RNA during the nuclease digestion step.
