= Nuclease S1 =

Class of enzymes

Identifiers
- EC no.: 3.1.30.1
- CAS no.: 37288-25-8

Databases
- BRENDA: enzyme data
- ExPASy: NiceZyme view
- KEGG: enzyme entry
- MetaCyc: metabolic pathway
- Rhea: reactions
- PDB structures: RCSB PDB PDBe PDBsum
Search
- PMC: articles
- PubMed: articles
- NCBI: proteins

S1-P1 nuclease
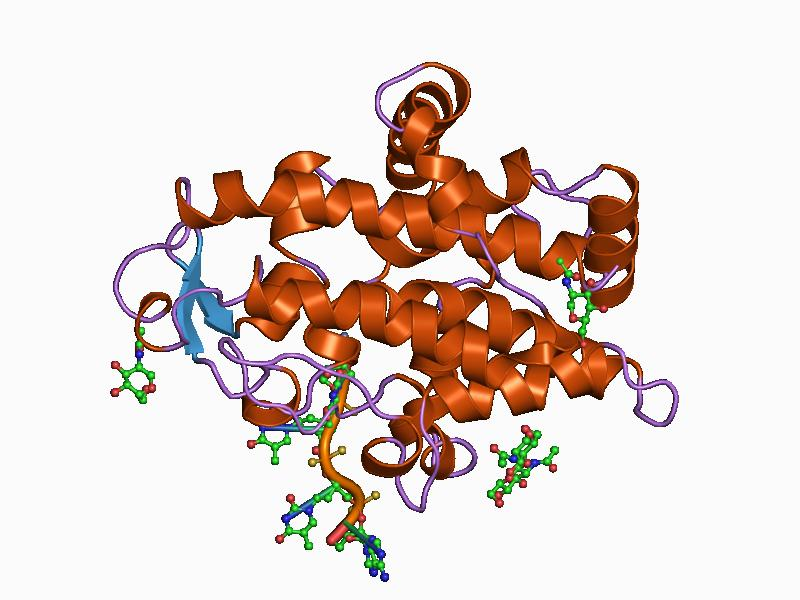
- P1 nuclease in complex with a substrate analog

Identifiers
- Symbol: S1-P1_nuclease
- Pfam: PF02265
- Pfam clan: CL0368
- InterPro: IPR003154
- SCOP2: 1ak0 / SCOPe / SUPFAM
- CDD: cd11010
Available protein structures:
- PDB: IPR003154 PF02265 (ECOD; PDBsum)
- AlphaFold: IPR003154; PF02265

Nuclease S1 (EC 3.1.30.1) is an endonuclease enzyme that splits single-stranded DNA (ssDNA) and RNA into oligo- or mononucleotides. This enzyme catalyses the following chemical reaction

Endonucleolytic cleavage to 5'-phosphomononucleotide and 5'-phosphooligonucleotide end-products

Although its primary substrate is single-stranded, it can also occasionally introduce single-stranded breaks in double-stranded DNA or RNA, or DNA-RNA hybrids. The enzyme hydrolyses single stranded region in duplex DNA such as loops or gaps. It also cleaves a strand opposite a nick on the complementary strand. It has no sequence specificity.

Well-known versions include S1 found in Aspergillus oryzae (yellow koji mold) and Nuclease P1 found in Penicillium citrinum. Members of the S1/P1 family are found in both prokaryotes and eukaryotes and are thought to be associated in programmed cell death and also in tissue differentiation. Furthermore, they are secreted extracellular, that is, outside of the cell. Their function and distinguishing features mean they have potential in being exploited in the field of biotechnology.

== Nomenclature ==
Alternative names include endonuclease S1 (Aspergillus), single-stranded-nucleate endonuclease, deoxyribonuclease S1, deoxyribonuclease S1, Aspergillus nuclease S1, Neurospora crassa single-strand specific endonuclease, S1 nuclease, single-strand endodeoxyribonuclease, single-stranded DNA specific endonuclease, single-strand-specific endodeoxyribonuclease, single strand-specific DNase and Aspergillus oryzae S1 nuclease.

== Structure ==
Most nucleases with EC 3.1.30.1 activity are homologous to each other in a protein domain family called Nuclease S1/P1.

Members of this family, including P1 and S1, are glycoproteins with very distinguishing features, they are:

- a requirement for three zinc ions cofactors,
- containing common active site motifs and
- requires an acidic pH for catalysis.
- contains three glycans bound to the amino acid asparagine via N-glycosylation
- two Disulphide bridges between cysteine residues.

These requirements and distinguishing features are responsible for function efficacy. It is an enzyme and these four features are needed for enzyme functionality. The three zinc ions are vital for catalysis. The first two zincs activate the attacking water in hydrolysis whilst the third zinc ion stabilizes the leaving oxyanion.

== Properties ==
Nuclease S1

Identifiers
- Organism: Aspergillus oryzae
- Symbol: NucS
- Orthologs: OMA: entry
- UniProt: P24021
Search for
- Structures: Swiss-model
- Domains: InterPro

Nuclease P1

Identifiers
- Organism: Penicillium citrinum
- Symbol: NuP1
- Orthologs: OMA: entry
- UniProt: P24289
Search for
- Structures: Swiss-model
- Domains: InterPro

Aspergillus nuclease S1 is a monomeric protein of a molecular weight of 38 kilodalton. It requires Zn^{2+} as a cofactor and is relatively stable against denaturing agents like urea, SDS, or formaldehyde. The optimum pH for its activity lies between 4-4.5. Aspergillus nuclease S1 is known to be inhibited somewhat by 50 μM ATP and nearly completely by 1 mM ATP. 50% inhibition has been shown at 85 μM dAMP and 1 μM dATP but uninhibited by cAMP.

== Mechanism ==
This zinc-dependent nuclease protein domain produces 5' nucleotides and cleaves phosphate groups from 3' nucleotides. Additionally, the side chain of tryptophan located in the cavity in the active site and its backbone supports the action one of the zinc ions. Such mechanisms are essential to the catalytic function of the enzyme.

== Uses ==
Aspergillus nuclease S1 is used in the laboratory as a reagent in nuclease protection assays. In molecular biology, it is used in removing single stranded tails from DNA molecules to create blunt ended molecules and opening hairpin loops generated during synthesis of double stranded cDNA.

== See also ==
- Mung bean nuclease, similar activity but probably not homologous [structure search finds similarity -> ref needed for 'non homologous' statement]
- DNA/RNA non-specific endonuclease, non-homologous family with similar DNA/RNA activity but accepts double-stranded substrate better
