= Primer extension =

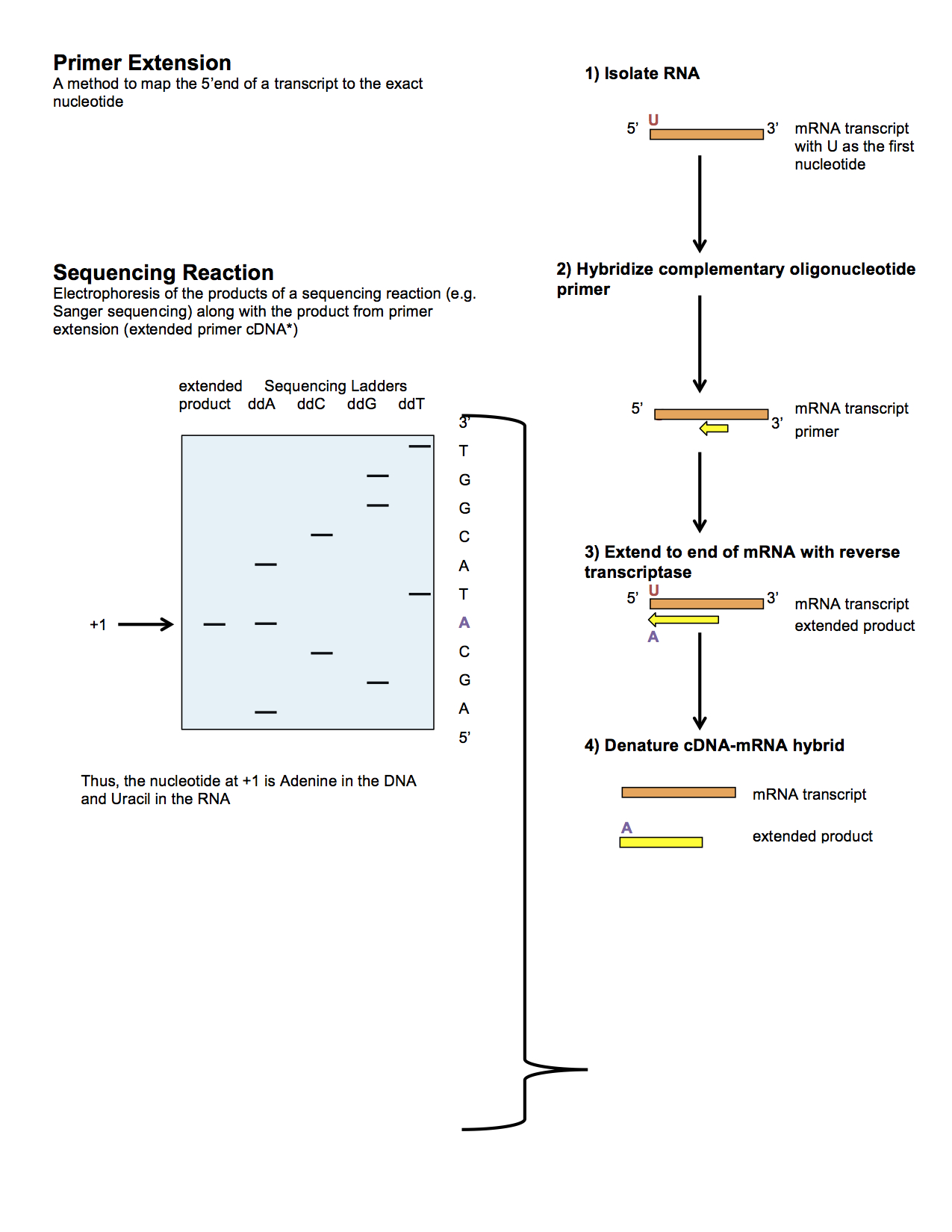
Overview of the primer extension. Transcript of interest has uracil at +1 (unknown before assay). 2) Synthesize an 5’ end-labeled primer (using [γ32P] ATP. 3) Make cDNA by extending primer with reverse transcriptase to 5’-end of transcript. 4) Result is a radioactively labeled extended primer cDNA that is denatured and separated on a polyacrylamide gel and detected by autoradiography. Typically, a sequencing ladder using the same primer is also on the gel, allowing for rapid identification of the +1 nucleotide (shown in purple.)

Primer extension is a technique whereby the 5' ends of RNA can be mapped - that is, they can be sequenced and properly identified.

Primer extension can be used to determine the start site of transcription (the end site cannot be determined by this method) by which its sequence is known. This technique requires a radiolabelled primer (usually 20 - 50 nucleotides in length) which is complementary to a region near the 3' end of the mRNA. The primer is allowed to anneal to the RNA and reverse transcriptase is used to synthesize cDNA from the RNA until it reaches the 5' end of the RNA. By denaturing the hybrid and using the extended primer cDNA as a marker on an electrophoretic gel, it is possible to determine the transcriptional start site. It is usually done so by comparing its location on the gel with the DNA sequence (e.g. Sanger sequencing), preferably by using the same primer on the DNA template strand. The exact nucleotide by which the transcription starts at can be pinpointed by matching the labelled extended primer with the marker nucleotide, who are both sharing the same migration distance on the gel.

Primer extension offers an alternative to a nuclease protection assay (S1 nuclease mapping) for quantifying and mapping RNA transcripts. The hybridization probe for primer extension is a synthesized oligonucleotide, whereas S1 mapping requires isolation of a DNA fragment. Both methods provide information where a mRNA starts and provide an estimate of the concentration of a transcript by the intensity of the transcript band on the resulting autoradiograph. Unlike S1 mapping, however, primer extension can only be used to locate the 5’-end of an mRNA transcript because the DNA synthesis required for the assay relies on reverse transcriptase (only polymerizes in the 5’ → 3’ direction).

Primer extension is unaffected by splice sites and is thus preferable in situations where intervening splice sites prevent S1 mapping. Finally, primer extension is more accurate than S1 mapping because the S1 nuclease used in S1 mapping can “nibble off” ends of the RNA-DNA hybrid or fail to degrade the single-stranded regions completely, making a transcript either appear shorter or longer.
