= Mung bean starch jelly =

Mung bean starch jelly may refer to:

- Liangfen, mung bean starch jelly in China
- Nokdu-muk, mung bean starch jelly in Korea
- Laping, mung bean starch jelly in Tibet

== See also ==
- Mung bean
- Mung bean jelly (disambiguation)
