= Mung bean jelly =

Mung bean jelly may refer to:

- Liangfen, Chinese jelly made of mung bean starch
- Nokdumuk, Korean jelly made of mung bean starch
  - Cheongpomuk, white mung bean jelly
  - Hwangpomuk, yellow mung bean jelly
- Mung bean starch jelly (disambiguation)
